= Glatton =

Village in Cambridgeshire, England

Coordinates: 52.460°N 0.302°W

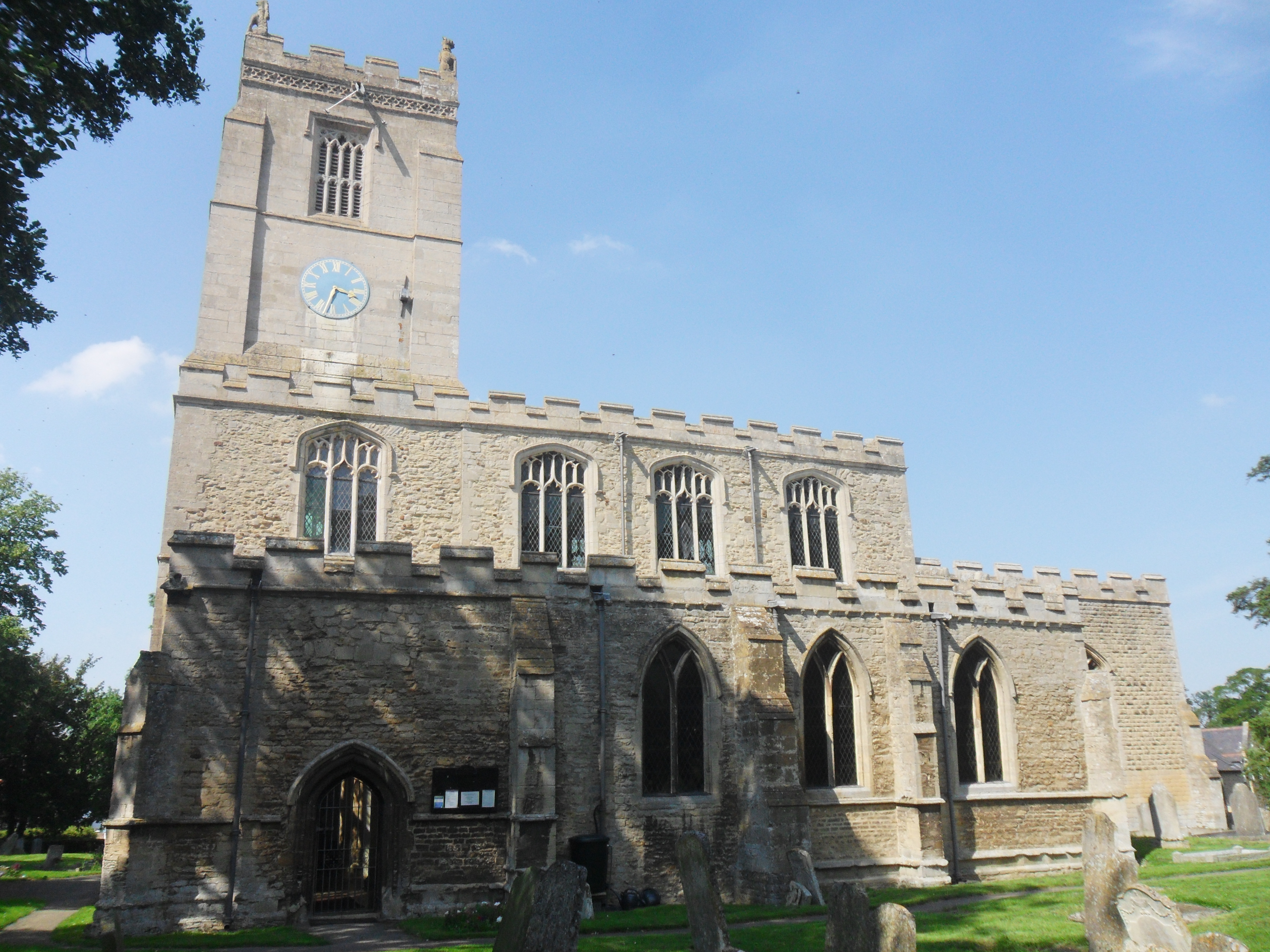
- St Nicholas, Glatton

- Location within Cambridgeshire
- Population: 308 (2011)
- OS grid reference: TL154860
- Civil parish: Glatton
- District: Huntingdonshire
- Shire county: Cambridgeshire
- Region: East
- Country: England
- Sovereign state: United Kingdom
- Post town: HUNTINGDON
- Postcode district: PE28
- Dialling code: 01487
- UK Parliament: North West Cambridgeshire

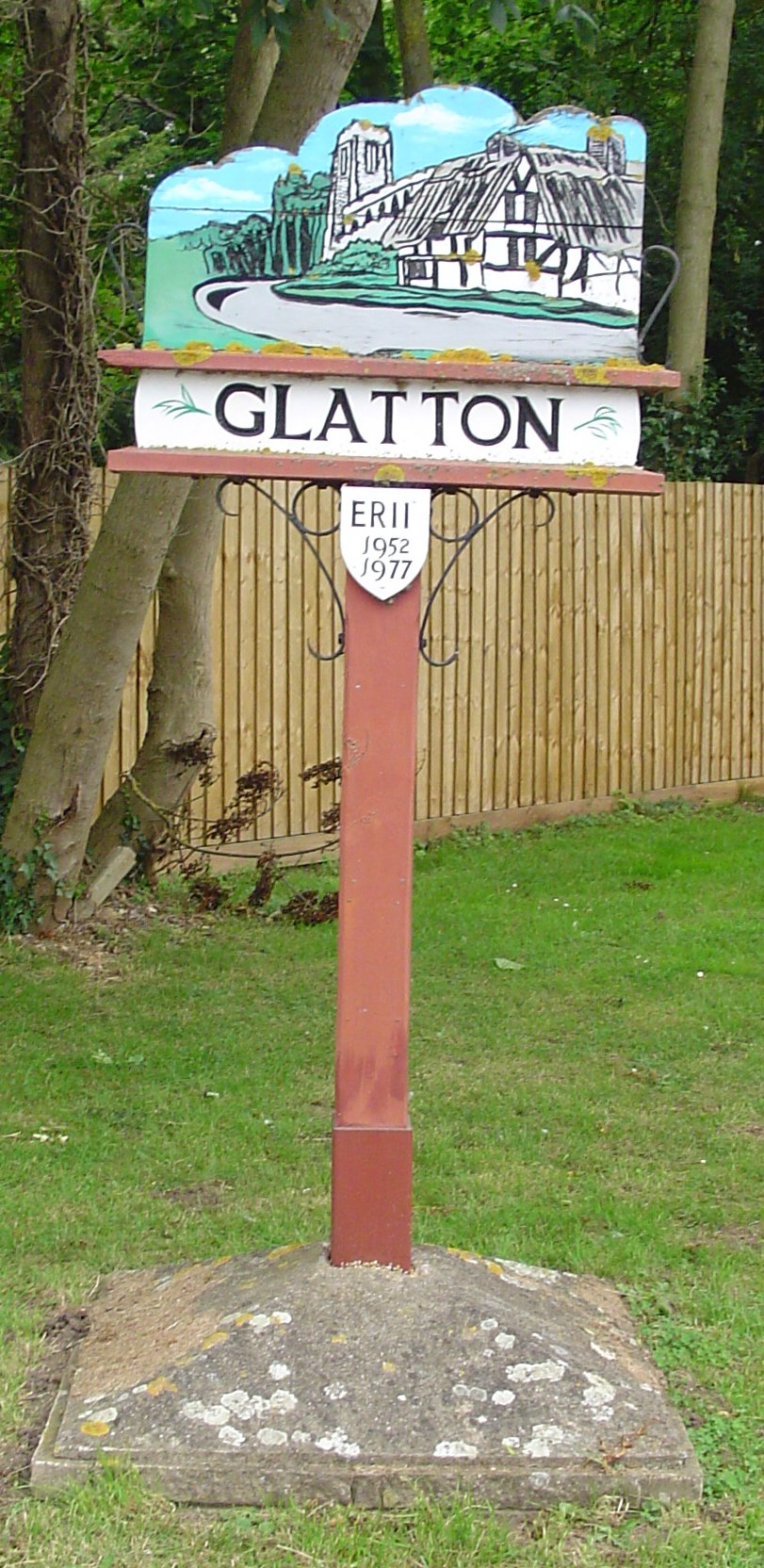
Glatton village sign

Glatton is a village and civil parish in Cambridgeshire, England, some 8 miles (13 km) south-west of Peterborough, near the villages of Conington, Yaxley and Stilton. It lies in the non-metropolitan district of Huntingdonshire, which is part of Cambridgeshire as well as being a historic county. A World War II airfield (RAF Glatton) built nearby is now known as Peterborough's Conington Airport.

== History ==
In 1085, William the Conqueror ordered that a survey should be carried out across his kingdom to discover who owned which parts and what it was worth. The survey took place in 1086 and the results were recorded in what, since the 12th century, has become known as the Domesday Book. Starting with the king himself, for each landholder within a county there is a list of their estates or manors; And, for each manor, there is a summary of the resources of the manor, the amount of annual rent that was collected by the lord of the manor both in 1066 and in 1086, together with the taxable value.

Glatton was listed in the Domesday Book in the Hundred of Normancross in Huntingdonshire; the name of the settlement was written as Glatune in the Domesday Book. In 1086 there was just one manor at Glatton; the annual rent paid to the lord of the manor in 1066 had been £10 and the rent was the same in 1086.

The Domesday Book does not explicitly detail the population of a place but it records that there was 35 households at Glatton. There is no consensus about the average size of a household at that time; estimates range from 3.5 to 5.0 people per household. Using these figures then an estimate of the population of Glatton in 1086 is that it was within the range of 122 and 175 people.

The Domesday Book uses a number of units of measure for areas of land that are now unfamiliar terms, such as hides and ploughlands. In different parts of the country, these were terms for the area of land that a team of eight oxen could plough in a single season and are equivalent to 120 acres (49 hectares); this was the amount of land that was considered to be sufficient to support a single family. By 1086, the hide had become a unit of tax assessment rather than an actual land area; a hide was the amount of land that could be assessed as £1 for tax purposes. The survey records that there were sixteen ploughlands at Glatton in 1086 and that there was the capacity for a further eight ploughlands. In addition to the arable land, there was 60 acres (24 hectares) of meadow and 22 acres (9 hectares) of woodland at Glatton.

The tax assessment in the Domesday Book was known as geld or danegeld and was a type of land-tax based on the hide or ploughland. It was originally a way of collecting a tribute to pay off the Danes when they attacked England, and was only levied when necessary. Following the Norman Conquest, the geld was used to raise money for the King and to pay for continental wars; by 1130, the geld was being collected annually. Having determined the value of a manor's land and other assets, a tax of so many shillings and pence per pound of value would be levied on the land holder. While this was typically two shillings in the pound the amount varied; for example, in 1084 it was as high as six shillings in the pound. For the manor at Glatton the total tax assessed was eight geld.

By 1086, there was already a church and a priest at Glatton.

In the 1870s, John Marius Wilson described the village as "GLATTON, a village and a parish in the district of Peterborough and county of Huntingdon. The village stands 3 miles SSW of Stilton, and 3½ WSW of Holme r. station."

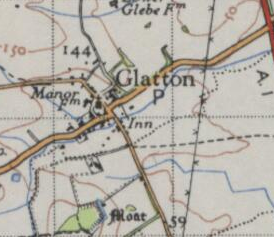
A close up of Glatton from an Ordnance survey map from the 20th century

In 1881, Glatton had a total population of 249.

== Government ==
As a civil parish, Glatton has a parish council, the lowest tier of government in England. It consists of five councillors and it has a parish clerk. It normally meets on a Wednesday, some 4–6 times a year.

Glatton was in the historic and administrative county of Huntingdonshire until 1965. From 1965, the village was part of the new administrative county of Huntingdon and Peterborough. Then in 1974, following the Local Government Act 1972, Glatton became a part of the county of Cambridgeshire.

The second tier of local government is the Huntingdonshire District Council of Cambridgeshire, with its headquarters in Huntingdon. Its 52 councillors represent 29 district wards. Glatton is a part of the district ward of Sawtry and represented on the district council by two councillors. District councillors serve four-year terms.

For Glatton, the highest tier of local government is Cambridgeshire County Council, based in Cambridge. It consists of 69 councillors representing 60 electoral divisions. Glatton is part of the electoral division of Sawtry and Ellington and represented by one county councillor. At Westminster Glatton is in the parliamentary constituency of North West Cambridgeshire, held by Sam Carling (Labour) since 2024. The previous member was Shailesh Vara (Conservative) between 2005 and 2024.

== Demography ==
=== Population ===
In the period 1801 to 1901, the census population of Glatton ranged between 189 in 1901 and 358 in 1821.

Parish	1911	1921	1931	1951	1961	1971	1981	1991	2001	2011	2021
Glatton	154	154	155	136	146	193	214	232	304	308	272

All population census figures from report Historic Census figures Cambridgeshire to 2011 by Cambridgeshire Insight, except for the 2021 figure which is taken from Census Data UK.

In 2011, the parish covered an area of 2,174 acres (880 hectares), giving a population density in 2011 of 90.7 persons per square mile (35 per square kilometre). Of the 2011 population of 308, 35 were in the 0–19 cohort, 62 aged 20–44, 142 aged 45–74 and 79 over 75 years old. The structure is weighted to the older population; 72 per cent are above 45 years old. Census records show a decline until 1951, to 136, then a relatively swift rise.

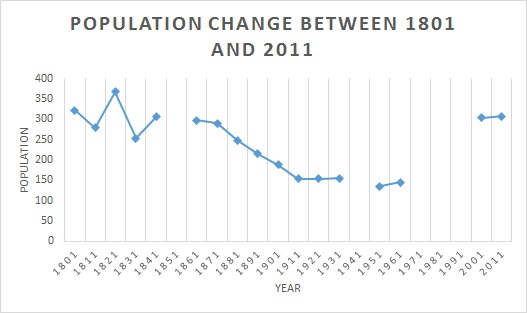
Glatton population change

=== Occupations ===
In 1881, there was a clear gender divide in occupations. Most men worked in agriculture (74 per cent), with a fairly even spread among other occupations. Most women had were of unknown occupation or worked in domestic services/ offices. In the 2011 census, both men and women had the highest levels of employment in associate professional and technical occupations, with a far greater number in management or as professionals. There was still some gender-specific employment, for example administrative and secretarial jobs employed more women (5:1) and the skilled trade sector more men (4:1). However, men and women appear more evenly across all occupations in the later census. Agricultural and domestic jobs, the commonest in 1881, were non-existent in 2011.

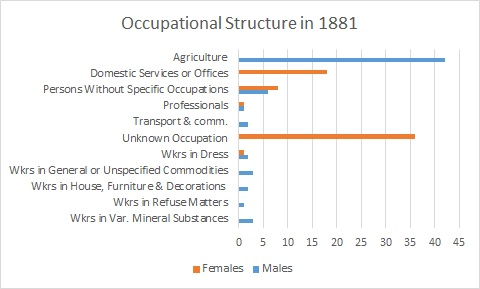
Glatton occupational structure 1881

Graph showing the occupational structure of Glatton in 2011, for both males and females.

== Education ==
There are no schools in Glatton. The closest is Stilton Church of England VC Primary School 1.8 miles (2.9 km) away. The closest secondary school is Sawtry Community College 2.1 miles (3.4 km) away.

== Landmarks ==
Among the listed buildings in Glatton are Grade-I listed St Nicholas's Parish Church and the Addison Arms, which won the Rural Pub of The Year award in Huntingdonshire in 2014. Allways was the home of the writer Beverley Nichols from 1928 to 1937.

== Transport ==
The A1 (M) is the closest motorway, about a mile to the east of Glatton parish. There is a railway line about 3 miles east of Glatton, but the closest station is Peterborough, about 10 miles away.

== Parish church ==
Glatton has a parish church dedicated to St Nicholas belonging to the Diocese of Ely. The church is mentioned in the 1086 Domesday Book, but none of that building remains. A notable feature of today's church is its tower, built about 1500. Its four bells bear the inscriptions 1) COMM COMM AND PREAY 1595, 2) SEARVE GOD AND OBEAY THY PRINCE 1595, 3) J.TAYLOR & CO FOUNDERS LOUGHBOROUGH 1863, and 4) OMNIA FAINT AD GLORIAM DEI SOLI THO. EAYRE 1736.
