= 751 Squadron =

751 Squadron may refer to:

- 751 Squadron (Portugal)
- 751 Naval Air Squadron, Royal Navy
- 751st Bombardment Squadron, United States Army Air Forces
- 751st Radar Squadron, United States Air Force
