= B-17 Flying Fortress units of the United States Army Air Forces =

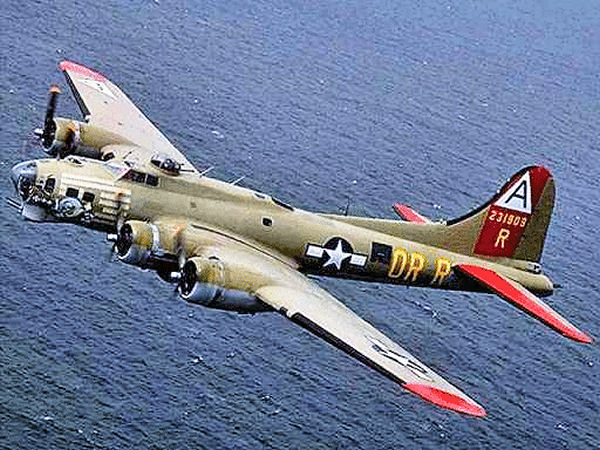
The Collings Foundation B-17G N93012 restored to represent B-17G Nine-O-Nine of the 323rd Bomb Squadron, one of two longest-serving B-17's of the 91st BG; the original "Nine-O-Nine" was scrapped after World War II in Kingman, Arizona.

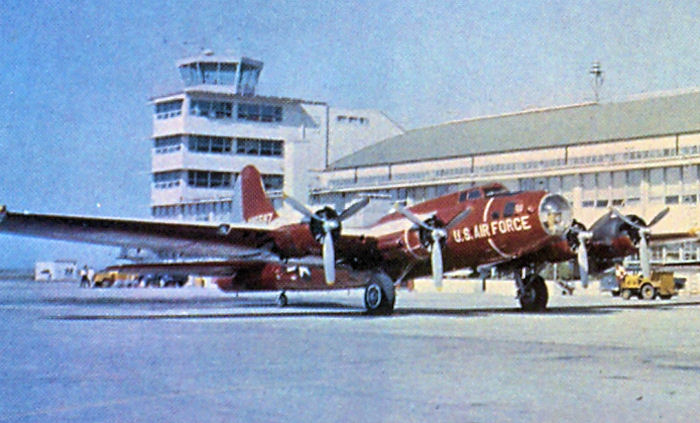
One of the last QB-17 Drones at Holloman AFB, New Mexico, 1959

This is a list of United States Army Air Forces B-17 Flying Fortress units of the United States Army Air Forces, including variants and other historical information. Heavy bomber training organizations primarily under II Bomber Command in the United States and non-combat units are not included.

The B-17 Flying Fortress was perhaps the most well-known American heavy bomber of the Second World War (1939/41-1945). It achieved a fame far beyond that of its more-numerous contemporary, the Consolidated B-24 Liberator. The first pre-production Y1B-17 Fortress was delivered to the 2nd Bombardment Group, Langley Field, Virginia on 11 January 1936; the first production B-17B was delivered on 29 March 1939, also to the 2nd Bombardment Group. A total of 12,677 production Fortresses was built before production came to an end. In August 1944, the Boeing B-17 equipped no less than 33 overseas combat groups.

The last Boeing-built B-17G was delivered to the USAAF on 13 April 1945. Following the end of World War II, the Flying Fortress was rapidly withdrawn from USAAF service, being replaced by the B-29 Superfortress. Literally thousands of Fortresses used in combat in Europe by Eighth or Fifteenth Air Force or in the United States by II Bomber Command training units were flown to various disposal units. A few were sold to private owners, but the vast majority were cut up for scrap.

Aircraft in the final early 1945 production manufacturing block by Boeing or Lockheed-Vega (Block 110) were converted to the B-17H search and rescue model, being modified to carry a lifeboat under the fuselage. Postwar B-17s were used by the Military Air Transport Service Air Rescue Service, in 1948 being re-designated SB-17G. Some RB-17Gs were also used by the MATS Air Photographic and Charting Service (APCS). A few SB-17s were used by the Air Rescue Service in Japan during the Korean War (1950–1953), but all of the postwar B-17s were retired from MATS by the mid-1950s, becoming Air Proving Ground Command QB-17 Drones or DB-17 Drone directors. The drones were operated primarily by the 3205th Drone Group, Eglin AFB, Florida.

The last operational USAF B-17 mission was on 6 August 1959, when DB-17P 44-83684 (Originally a Douglas/Long Beach B-17G-90-DL) directed QB-17G 44-83717 which was expended as a target for an AIM-4 Falcon air-to-air missile fired from an F-101 Voodoo, near Holloman AFB, New Mexico. 44-83684 arrived at Davis-Monthan AFB for storage a few days later. The few DB-17P remaining operational drone controllers remaining on Air Force rolls afterward were transferred to various museums in 1960.

== Combat Organizations ==
=== Fifth Air Force ===
Prior to the Japanese Attack on Pearl Harbor on Sunday, 7 December 1941, the 19th Bombardment Group had 35 B-17s in the Philippines. By 14 December, only 14 remained. Beginning on 17 December, the surviving B-17s based there began to be evacuated south to Australia, and were then sent to Singosari Airfield, Java in the Dutch East Indies (modern Indonesia) on 30 December 1941.

The 7th Bomb Group was originally scheduled to reinforce the Philippines in December 1941 from Fort Douglas, Utah, and the ground echelon had already left by ship from San Francisco. The unexpected Pearl Harbor Attack led to the ground echelon being returned to United States and the air echelon remained at Hamilton Field, California, flying antisubmarine patrols over the West Coast along the Pacific Ocean. 9th Bomb Squadron deployed to the Southwest Pacific in mid-December, traveling the long way around by flying east via Florida, Brazil, across the South Atlantic Ocean to central Africa then to the Middle East. The unit continued around the northern coasts of the Indian Ocean via Arabia to Karachi, India via Singapore to Singosari Airfield on Java, joining the 19th BG on 14 January.

Both units would remain on Java until March 1942, taking part in the brave, but ultimately futile, attempts to defend the Philippines on the Bataan peninsula and the island fortress of Corregidor, along with the Netherlands colony in Southeast Asia of the Dutch East Indies. The B-17s were never present in large enough numbers to make any real difference, however, to the course of the campaign. The 19th BG withdrew to Australia with the B-17 survivors of the 9th Bomb Squadron, which was re-equipped with Liberator B-24s in India as part of the Tenth Air Force. Nine of the survivors were eventually sent to the Middle East in July to defend Egypt against the advancing German Afrika Corps in North Africa.

The 19th BG received some replacement aircraft and was joined by the 43rd Bomb Group in Australia in March. The two units took part in the campaign on Papua New Guinea, before the 19th BG was moved back to the United States at the end of 1942, transferring its assets to the 43rd. The 43rd BG flew combat missions with B-17s until August 1943, when they were replaced by B-24s.

- 7th Bombardment Group

Received B-17Bs, 1939 at Hamilton Field, California (USAAC)
Deployed to Netherlands East Indies, Jan–Mar 1942 with 7 B-17Es
9th Bombardment Squadron operated from Java until withdrawn in Mar 1942.
Squadron reassigned to Tenth Air Force in India.

- 19th Bombardment Group

Received B-17Bs, 1939 at March Field, California (USAAC)
Deployed to Clark Field, Philippines Oct 1941 with B-17Cs
Operated from Philippines, Australia, Netherlands East Indies, Oct 1941 – Dec 1942
14th Bombardment Squadron (Del Monte Field)*

Designated as Non-Operational, Mar 1942

28th Bombardment Squadron (Clark Field)*
30th Bombardment Squadron (Clark Field)*
93rd Bombardment Squadron (Del Monte Field)*
40th Reconnaissance Squadron (Formed Mar 1942 in Australia)**

Redesignated: 435th Bombardment Squadron (Apr–Dec 1942)

Returned to United States as B-17 OTU, B-17s to 43rd BG Dec 1942

- 43rd Bombardment Group

Received B-17Bs at Langley Field, Virginia, Jan 1941 (USAAC)
Flew Coastal patrols, Jan 1941 – Feb 1942 under First Air Force (USAAC)
Deployed to Australia, Mar 1942 with B-17Es
Operated from Australia, New Guinea, Mar 1942 – Aug 1943
63rd Bombardment Squadron
64th Bombardment Squadron
65th Bombardment Squadron
403rd Bombardment Squadron
Converted to B-24 Liberators, Aug 1943

Note* Personnel of squadron not required for flight operations transferred to V Interceptor Command, 24 December 1941. Fought as infantry during Battle of Bataan.

Note** Formed with 7th BG B-17E aircraft and personnel that arrived in Australia, Mar 1942 and 10 Sierra Bombardment Group B-17Es, arrived in Australia c 20 January.

=== Sixth Air Force ===
About thirty B-17s (B/D/E/F) served in the Caribbean and Antilles Air Commands during World War II, the first (B-17D 40-3058) arriving in Panama Canal Zone during March 1941. However, usually less than ten were operational at any one time. They were mostly R- (Restricted from combat) RB-17Bs and Ds stationed at Río Hato Field, but some were at Albrook Field. Later E and F models no longer suitable for training were obtained as replacement aircraft. Some were based at Waller Field, Trinidad. B-17s were used for long-range antisubmarine patrols over the Caribbean, South Atlantic and Eastern Pacific approaches to the Panama Canal, and for long-distance transport flights to Ecuador, Peru, British Guiana and Brazil. In addition to the Sixth Air Force B-17s, F-9 photo-mapping Fortresses of the 1st Photographic Group were frequently in the command's AOR, as well as in South America on aerial survey and mapping missions.

- 6th Bombardment Group

Río Hato Field, Panama, 1941 – May 1942
3rd Bombardment Squadron
Reassigned to Galapagos Islands, May 1942

- 9th Bombardment Group

Waller Field, Trinidad, 1941 – May 1942
430th Bombardment Squadron
Reassigned to Army Air Forces School of Applied Tactics, May 1942

- 40th Bombardment Group

Albrook Field, Canal Zone, 1941 – Jul 1943
44th Bombardment Squadron
Reassigned for B-29 Transition Training, Jul 1943

=== Seventh/Thirteenth Air Force ===
The B-17 was to achieve its first taste of combat during the Pearl Harbor Attack, when the 5th Bombardment Group based at Hickam Field, Hawaii had 12 B-17Ds parked on the ramp. Five of these B-17s were destroyed, and eight were damaged in the attack. On 7 December, The 38th Reconnaissance Squadron (Heavy), 11th Bombardment Group, with four B-17Cs and two new B-17Es was inbound from Hamilton Field, California to Hickam on their way to the Philippines to reinforce the American forces there. They arrived at Hickam at the height of the attack. One was destroyed, three others badly damaged. Remaining in Hawaii after the attack, in June 1942, B-17s from the 5th and 11th Bomb Groups were used in the Battle of Midway, but with little effectiveness.

Both the 5th and 11th Bombardment Groups joined the Thirteenth Air Force during 1942 and took part in the American campaign in the south west Pacific, fighting during the campaigns in the Solomon Islands (including the battle for Guadalcanal) and the return campaign to the Philippines. By the middle of 1943 both units had replaced their B-17s with B-24 Liberators.

- 5th Bombardment Group

Hawaii, Solomon Islands, Nov 1941 – Aug 1943
23rd Bombardment Squadron
31st Bombardment Squadron
72nd Bombardment Squadron
394th Bombardment Squadron
Converted to B-24 Liberators, Aug 1943

- 11th Bombardment Group

Hawaii, New Hebrides, Nov 1941 – Aug 1943
26th Bombardment Squadron
42nd Bombardment Squadron
98th Bombardment Squadron
431st Bombardment Squadron
Converted to B-24 Liberators, Aug 1943

=== Eighth Air Force ===
See: Eighth Air Force

Was primary operator of B-17 Flying Fortresses in overseas combat theaters during World War II. The B-17 may have first seen combat in American markings in the Philippines, but it would earn its enduring fame with the Eighth Air Force, based in England and fighting over Occupied Europe. The story of the B-17 would become the story of the VIII Bomber Command (later Eighth Air Force) strategic heavy bombardment campaign of the European Theater of Operations (ETO) during World War II.

Initially equipped with B-17Es in 1942, the Eighth Air Force received B-17Fs in Jan 1943 and B-17Gs in Nov 1943. Flying Fortresses were employed in long-range strategic bombardment operations over Occupied Europe and Nazi Germany, August 1942 – May 1945 attacking enemy military, transportation and industrial targets as part of the United States' air offensive against Nazi Germany.

- 34th Bombardment Group

Coastal patrol B-17s, Jan 1941 – May 1942 under First Air Force
Deployed to ETO May 1944 with B-24s; transitioned to B-17s Sep 1944
RAF Mendlesham (AAF-156), Sep 1944 – Aug 1945
4th Bombardment Squadron
7th Bombardment Squadron
18th Bombardment Squadron
391st Bombardment Squadron
Inactivated Aug 1945

- 91st Bombardment Group

RAF Bassingbourn (AAF-121), Oct 1942 – Jun 1945
322nd Bombardment Squadron
323rd Bombardment Squadron
324th Bombardment Squadron
401st Bombardment Squadron
Inactivated Nov 1945

- 92nd Bombardment Group

RAF Bovingdon (AAF-112), Aug 1942 – Jan 1943; RAF Alconbury (AAF-102), Jan–Sep 1943; RAF Podington (AAF-109), Sep 1943 – Jun 1945
325th Bombardment Squadron
326th Bombardment Squadron
327th Bombardment Squadron (May–Jul 1943 YB-40 Testing)
407th Bombardment Squadron
To: Air Transport Command, Jun 1945, Absorbed into 306th BG, Feb 1946

- 94th Bombardment Group

RAF Bury St. Edmunds (AAF-468), May 1943 – Dec 1945
331st Bombardment Squadron
332nd Bombardment Squadron
333rd Bombardment Squadron
410th Bombardment Squadron
Inactivated Dec 1945

- 95th Bombardment Group

RAF Horham (AAF-119), May 1943 – Jun 1945
334th Bombardment Squadron
335th Bombardment Squadron
336th Bombardment Squadron
412th Bombardment Squadron
Inactivated Aug 1945

- 96th Bombardment Group

RAF Snetterton Heath (AAF-138), Apr 1943 – Dec 1945
337th Bombardment Squadron
338th Bombardment Squadron
339th Bombardment Squadron
413th Bombardment Squadron
Inactivated Dec 1945

- 100th Bombardment Group

RAF Thorpe Abbotts (AAF-139), Jun 1943 – Dec 1945
349th Bombardment Squadron
350th Bombardment Squadron
351st Bombardment Squadron
418th Bombardment Squadron
Inactivated Dec 1945

- 303rd Bombardment Group

RAF Molesworth (AAF-107), Sep 1942 – May 1945
358th Bombardment Squadron
359th Bombardment Squadron
360th Bombardment Squadron
427th Bombardment Squadron
Inactivated Jul 1945

- 305th Bombardment Group

RAF Chelveston (AAF-105), Sep 1942 – Jul 1945
364th Bombardment Squadron
365th Bombardment Squadron
366th Bombardment Squadron
422nd Bombardment Squadron
Inactivated Dec 1946

- 306th Bombardment Group

RAF Thurleigh (AAF-111), Sep 1942 – Dec 1945
367th Bombardment Squadron
368th Bombardment Squadron
369th Bombardment Squadron
423rd Bombardment Squadron
Inactivated Dec 1946

- 351st Bombardment Group

RAF Polebrook (AAF-110), May 1943 – Jun 1945
508th Bombardment Squadron
509th Bombardment Squadron
510th Bombardment Squadron
511th Bombardment Squadron
Inactivated Aug 1945

- 379th Bombardment Group

RAF Kimbolton (AAF-117), May 1943 – Jun 1945
524th Bombardment Squadron
525th Bombardment Squadron
526th Bombardment Squadron
527th Bombardment Squadron
Inactivated Jul 1945

- 381st Bombardment Group

RAF Ridgewell (AAF-167), Jun 1943 – Jun 1945
532nd Bombardment Squadron
533rd Bombardment Squadron
534th Bombardment Squadron
535th Bombardment Squadron
Inactivated Aug 1945

- 384th Bombardment Group

RAF Grafton Underwood (AAF-106), Jun 1943 – Jun 1945
544th Bombardment Squadron
545th Bombardment Squadron
546th Bombardment Squadron
547th Bombardment Squadron
Inactivated Feb 1946

- 385th Bombardment Group

RAF Great Ashfield (AAF-155), Jun 1943 – Aug 1945
548th Bombardment Squadron
549th Bombardment Squadron
550th Bombardment Squadron
551st Bombardment Squadron
Inactivated Aug 1945

- 388th Bombardment Group

RAF Knettishall (AAF-136), Jun 1943 – Aug 1945
560th Bombardment Squadron
561st Bombardment Squadron
562nd Bombardment Squadron
563rd Bombardment Squadron
Inactivated Sep 1945

- 390th Bombardment Group

RAF Framlingham (AAF-153), Jul 1943 – Aug 1945
568th Bombardment Squadron
569th Bombardment Squadron
570th Bombardment Squadron
571st Bombardment Squadron
Inactivated Aug 1945

- 398th Bombardment Group

RAF Nuthampstead (AAF-131), Apr 1944 – May 1945
600th Bombardment Squadron
601st Bombardment Squadron
602nd Bombardment Squadron
603rd Bombardment Squadron
Inactivated Sep 1945

- 401st Bombardment Group

RAF Deenethorpe (AAF-128), Nov 1943 – May 1945
612th Bombardment Squadron
613th Bombardment Squadron
614th Bombardment Squadron
615th Bombardment Squadron
Inactivated Aug 1945

- 447th Bombardment Group

RAF Rattlesden (AAF-126), Nov 1943 – Aug 1945
708th Bombardment Squadron
709th Bombardment Squadron
710th Bombardment Squadron
711th Bombardment Squadron
Inactivated Nov 1945

- 452nd Bombardment Group

RAF Deopham Green (AAF-142), Jan 1944 – Aug 1945
728th Bombardment Squadron
729th Bombardment Squadron
730th Bombardment Squadron
731st Bombardment Squadron
Inactivated Aug 1945

- 457th Bombardment Group

RAF Glatton (AAF-130), Jan 1944 – Jun 1945
748th Bombardment Squadron
749th Bombardment Squadron
750th Bombardment Squadron
751st Bombardment Squadron
Inactivated Aug 1945

- 482nd Bombardment Group

Aug 1943 – May 1945
RAF Alconbury (AAF-102)
Attached to: VIII Composite Command, Feb 1944 – Jan 1945
Composite group with 2 squadrons of B-17s and one of B-24s
Conducted Pathfinder missions using H2X radar
812th Bombardment Squadron (B-17)
813th Bombardment Squadron (B-17)
814th Bombardment Squadron (B-24)
Inactivated Sep 1945

- 486th Bombardment Group

RAF Sudbury (AAF-158), Aug 1944 – Aug 1945
Deployed to ETO, April 1944 with B-24s; Converted to B-17s, Aug 1944
832nd Bombardment Squadron
833rd Bombardment Squadron
834th Bombardment Squadron
835th Bombardment Squadron
Inactivated Nov 1945

- 487th Bombardment Group

RAF Lavenham (AAF-137), Jul 1944 – Aug 1945
Deployed to ETO, April 1944 with B-24s; Converted to B-17s, Jul 1944
836th Bombardment Squadron
837th Bombardment Squadron
838th Bombardment Squadron
839th Bombardment Squadron
Inactivated Nov 1945

- 490th Bombardment Group

Aug 1944 – Aug 1945
RAF Eye (AAF-134), Aug 1944 – Aug 1945
Deployed to ETO, April 1944 with B-24s; Converted to B-17s, Aug 1944
848th Bombardment Squadron
849th Bombardment Squadron
850th Bombardment Squadron
851st Bombardment Squadron
Inactivated Nov 1945

- 493rd Bombardment Group

RAF Wormingford (AAF-159); RAF Debach (AAF-152), May 1944 – Aug 1945
Deployed to ETO, April 1944 with B-24s; Converted to B-17s, May 1944
860th Bombardment Squadron
861st Bombardment Squadron
862nd Bombardment Squadron
863rd Bombardment Squadron
Inactivated Aug 1945

=== Twelfth/Fifteenth Air Force ===
Although less important than the B-24 Liberator in the Mediterranean Theater of Operations (MTO), six B-17 Groups did serve in North Africa and Italy, two of them serving from 1942 until the end of the war. Two B-17E groups (97th and 301st) deployed to Morocco and Algeria from VIII Bomber Command in England during November 1942. These were two of the most experienced B-17 units, and their departure from England slowed down the development of the Eighth Air Force's offensive. Later, two newly trained II Bomber Command groups (2nd, 99th) deployed from the United States. The four B-17E groups formed the heavy bomber component of XII Bomber Command (and Northwest African Strategic Air Force).

In North Africa Flying Fortresses were used against German and Italian military targets in Algeria and Tunisia, and to attack German shipping in the Mediterranean. Flying Fortresses took part in the bombardment of the Italian stronghold of Pantelleria, the invasion of Sicily and the invasion of Italy.

Once the Allies were firmly established on the Italian mainland, the B-17 squadrons moved Italy, joining the Fifteenth Air Force in November 1943 and were upgraded to B-17Gs. They were joined by two more groups (463rd, 483rd) in the spring of 1944, bringing the total up to six. At their peak there were 669 B-17 crews stationed in the Mediterranean theater. From bases around Foggia, the Fortresses engaged in long-range strategic bombardment of enemy military, transportation and industrial targets in the Balkans, Italy, Austria, France and southern Germany as part of the United States' air offensive against Nazi Germany. B-17s were also employed in tactical missions, supporting Fifth Army's campaign in Italy itself, most famously bombarding the monastery at Monte Cassino, and also took part in the invasion of southern France.

- 2nd Bombardment Group

Coastal patrol B-17Bs, Jul 1939 Jan 1941 – Oct 1942 under First Air Force
Deployed to North Africa with B-17Fs, Apr 1943
Transferred to Amendola Airfield, Italy (MTO), Oct 1943 – Feb 1946 (B-17G)
20th Bombardment Squadron
49th Bombardment Squadron
96th Bombardment Squadron
429th Bombardment Squadron
Inactivated Feb 1946

- 97th Bombardment Group

Deployed to ETO, RAF Polebrook (B-3/AAF-110), Jun–Nov 1942
Deployed to North Africa with B-17Fs, Nov 1942
Transferred to Amendola Airfield, Italy (MTO), Oct 1943 – Oct 1945 (B-17G)
340th Bombardment Squadron
341st Bombardment Squadron
342nd Bombardment Squadron
414th Bombardment Squadron
Inactivated Oct 1945

- 99th Bombardment Group

Deployed to North Africa with B-17Fs, Feb 1943
Transferred to Tortorella Airfield, Italy (MTO), Oct 1943 – Nov 1945 (B-17G)
346th Bombardment Squadron
347th Bombardment Squadron
348th Bombardment Squadron
416th Bombardment Squadron
Inactivated Nov 1945

- 301st Bombardment Group

Deployed to ETO, RAF Chelveston (B-6/AAF-105), Aug–Nov 1942
Deployed to North Africa with B-17Fs, Nov 1942
Transferred to Southern Italy (MTO), Oct 1943 – Jul 1945 (B-17G)
32nd Bombardment Squadron
352nd Bombardment Squadron
353rd Bombardment Squadron
419th Bombardment Squadron
Assigned to Second Air Force for B-29 training, Aug 1945
Inactivated Oct 1945

- 463rd Bombardment Group

Deployed to Celone Airfield, Italy (MTO), Mar 1944 – Sep 1945 (B-17G)
772nd Bombardment Squadron
773rd Bombardment Squadron
774th Bombardment Squadron
775th Bombardment Squadron
Inactivated Oct 1945

- 483rd Bombardment Group

Deployed to Sterparone Airfield, Italy (MTO), Mar 1944 – Sep 1945 (B-17G)
815th Bombardment Squadron
816th Bombardment Squadron
817th Bombardment Squadron
840th Bombardment Squadron
Inactivated Sep 1945

=== US Army, Middle East Air Force (USAMEAF)/Ninth Air Force ===
See: U.S. Army Forces in the Middle East

USAMEAF was a provisional organization formed at RAF Lydda, BritishPalestine on 1 July 1942. It consisted of nine B-17Es and 19 B-24 Liberators formerly of the 9th Bombardment and 88th Reconnaissance Squadrons, 7th Bombardment Group which arrived from Allahabad Airfield, India to aid British Forces in Egypt after General Erwin Rommel advanced the Afrika Corps toward the Suez Canal. The B-17s transferred to the Middle East were older aircraft that had escaped from the Philippines or were sent from the United States in January 1942 that had fought in the Netherlands East Indies with Fifth Air Force. They would be organized into the 1st Provisional Bombardment Group on 20 July. It was the core of what would eventually become the 376th Bombardment Group, Ninth Air Force, which was transferred to RAF Abu Sueir, Egypt on 12 November.

B-17s would be flown on combat missions from RAF Lyddia and RAF El Fayid, Egypt, attacking the harbor at Tobruk, Libya seven times with day and night raids throughout July, continually raiding the harbor shipping and disrupting Axis storage areas. It is believed that the Fortresses were sent to the secret Gura Army Air Base, Eritrea (Project 19) 15°1′13.764″N 39°02′7.62″E in August for depot-level maintenance, which was not possible at the British bases and had which been deferred since the beginning of the war in December.

The B-17Es would not engaged in combat again until mid-October, when raids on Tobruk began again on 12 October, and attacking a coastal road near Bardia, Libya on 20 October after a mission against Tobruk was canceled due to cloud cover. They were also engaged in attacking harbor facilities and Axis naval targets on Crete and Benghazi, Libya through which Afrika Korps supplies were landed. The B-17s made a final raid against installations at Sousse, Tunisia before being taken out of front-line service with the arrival of newer B-24 and B-25 units from the United States.
