= Peterborough Business Airport =

Airport in Peterborough, England

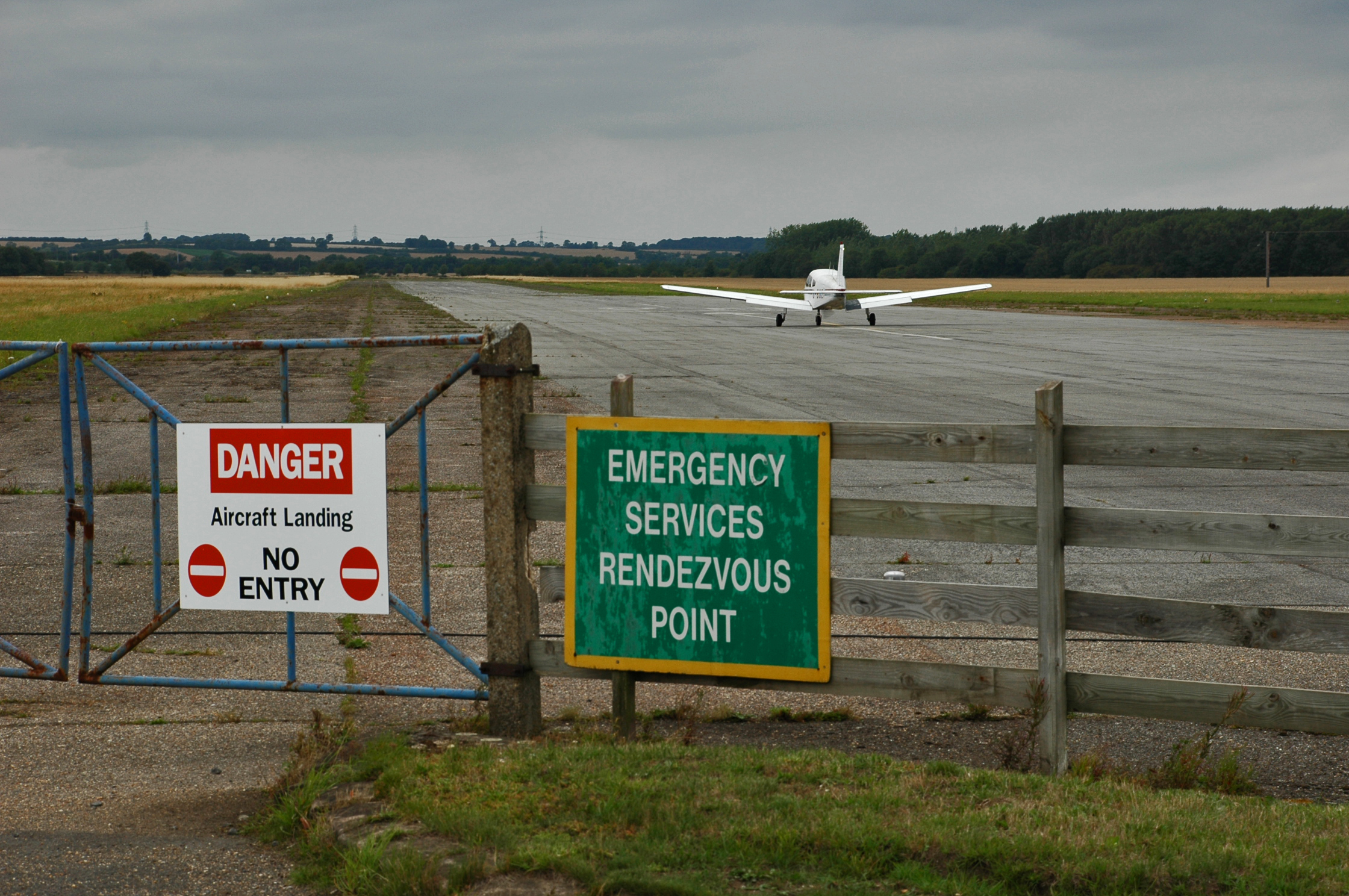
- Piper aircraft lined up for takeoff on Runway 28
- IATA: none; ICAO: EGSF

Summary
- Airport type: Private
- Operator: Aerolease Ltd
- Location: Peterborough
- Elevation AMSL: 26 ft (7.9 m)
- Coordinates: 52°28′05″N 000°15′03″W

Map
- Location in Cambridgeshire

Runways
Direction	Length		Surface
Direction	m	ft	Surface
10/28	987	3,238	Asphalt
16/34 (unlicensed)	n/a	n/a	n/a
- Sources: UK AIP at NATS

Peterborough Business Airport (ICAO: EGSF) is a privately owned airfield in the English county of Cambridgeshire near the villages of Holme and Conington, 7 NM (13 km; 8.1 mi) south of Peterborough.

== History ==
It was originally built as RAF Glatton in 1942–43 by the United States Army's 809th Engineer Battalion (Aviation) and housed B-17 Flying Fortress bombers of the 457th Bomb Group.

After World War II the field was passed to RAF Bomber Command but was mothballed in 1946. Over the years since, most of the ground structures have vanished, leaving just a blister hangar and the old station water tower. Next to the tower is a memorial dedicated to the USAAF's 457th Bomber Group and another memorial is in the local church at Conington. The road linking the villages of Holme and Conington has been reinstated down the old NE/SW runway, making it unusable by aircraft.

At the end of the 1960's the remaining E/W runway was being used by two local companies who were parking their small executive aircraft in the blister hangar, a small portacabin being used as a passenger reception location. A ground engineer provided basic maintenance facilities for both aircraft and a landline, air to ground radio and refuelling facilities were also in operation. As the original runway lighting was not usable, night flights were catered for by paraffin 'gooseneck' flares.

Mitchell Construction, an international tunnelling company based in Peterborough operated a Piper Aztec C (G-AWDI) while Hotpoint, a branch of GEC and with a factory and HQ also in Peterborough, had a Beech QueenAir 65 (G-ARFF), and later a QueenAir B80 (G-AWOI). In early 1973 Mitchell went bankrupt and their aviation set-up was terminated, and in 1975 new management at Hotpoint resulted in the closing down of their operation also.

The intervening history is unclear, by the mid-1970s there were portable cabins on site serving the airfield, and a dedicated building with control tower was built in 1995. In 2000 the flying club changed hands and was renamed Flying Club Conington.

Peterborough Conington Aerodrome has a CAA Ordinary Licence (Number P861) that allows flights for the public transport of passengers or for flying instruction as authorised by the licensee (Aerolease Limited).

== Facilities ==
The airfield is operated by Aerolease Ltd. Aviation fuel (both avgas and jet fuel) is available on-site; hangarage and parking by arrangement.

The main runway, 10/28, offers 987 m × 23 m (3,238 ft × 75 ft) of asphalt with a long overshoot. The unlicensed runway 16/34 is WW2 concrete.

Flying Club Conington offer fixed-wing aircraft hire and training and bar/catering facilities. Mid-Anglia School of Flying (MASF) also offer fixed-wing aircraft hire and training. Aerolease Engineering offer aircraft engineering services.

FlyCB permanently closed in 2016 it was a microlight Flying school offering training in the EV97 Team Eurostar high performance light aircraft style microlight. It offered courses for the National Private Pilots licence, aircraft hire, flight & ground examination.

Ampsair offers microlight flying training, private hire and ground school, flight and ground exams, microlight instructor courses, microlight to light aircraft training for SSEA rating.

Other tenants include MFH Helicopters who offer helicopter hire and training.

== Runways – Supplement ==
Although not AIP/NATS 'listed' runway 16/34 is approximately 800 metres in length and of broadly similar width to 10/28. Whilst it is in less good repair than the main 10/28 runway, some local pilots regard it as the preferable option when significant cross-wind conditions affect runway 10/28.

== Gallery ==
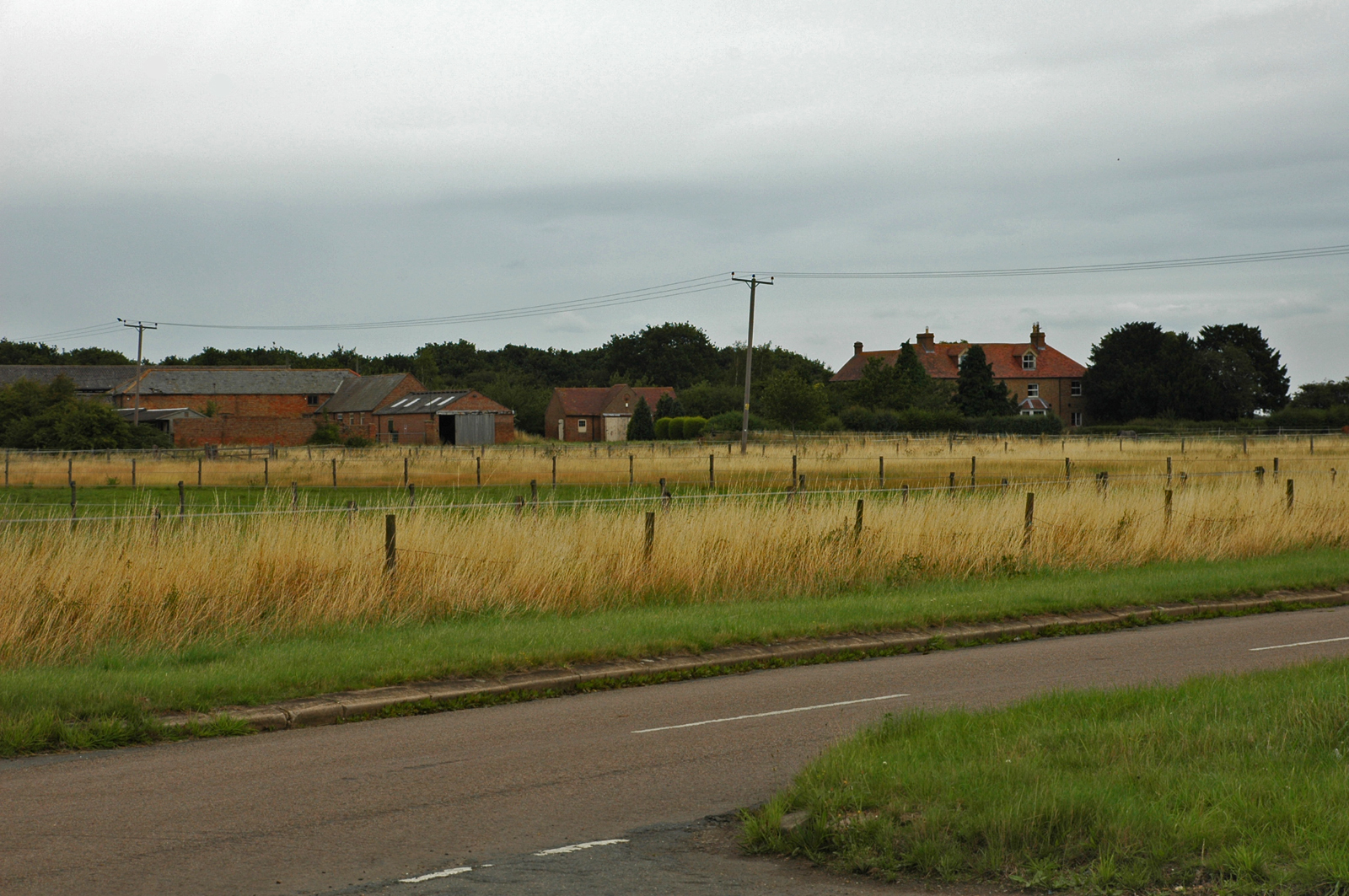
Rose Court Farm lies between the runways

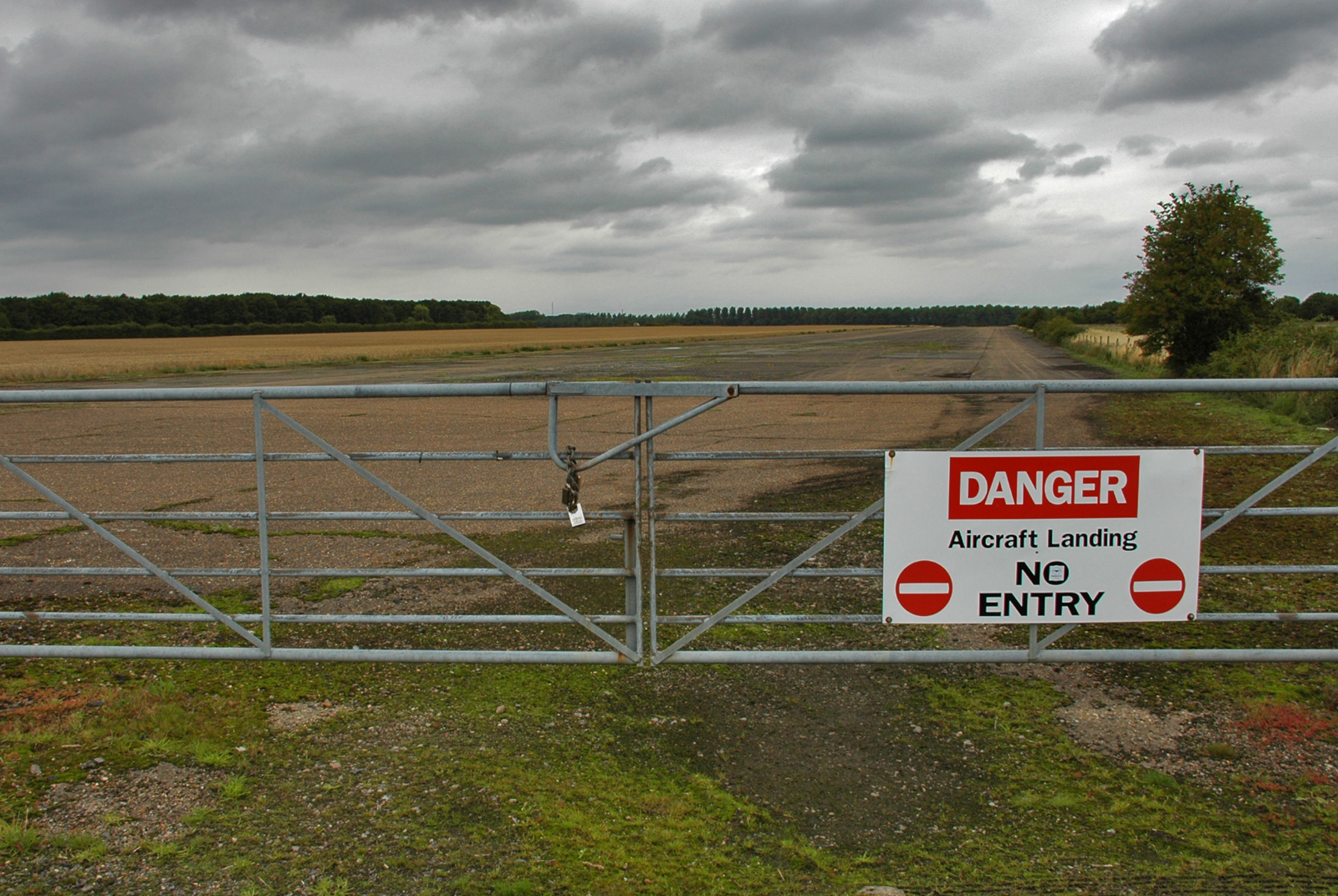
Looking roughly north along Runway 34
