= 547th Bombardment Squadron =

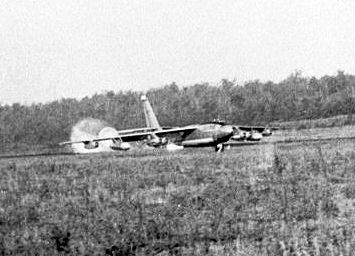
- 384th Bombardment Wing B-47 Stratojet landing at Little Rock AFB
- Active: 1942-1946; 1947-1949; 1958-1962
- Country: United States
- Branch: United States Air Force
- Role: Medium bomber
- Engagements: European Theater of Operations
- Decorations: Distinguished Unit Citation

Insignia
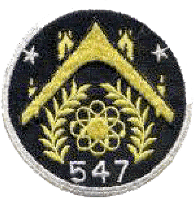
- Patch with 547th Bombardment Squadron emblem (Strategic Air Command)

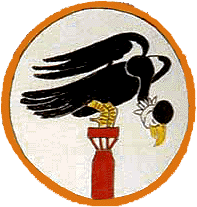
- 547th Bombardment Squadron emblem (World War II)
- World War II fuselage code: SO

The 547th Bombardment Squadron is an inactive United States Air Force unit. It was first activated during World War II as a Boeing B-17 Flying Fortress unit. After training in the United States, it deployed to the European Theater of Operations, where it participated in the strategic bombing campaign against Germany, earning two Distinguished Unit Citations. Following V-E Day, the squadron moved to France and was inactivated there in early 1946.

The squadron was activated again in the reserves in 1947, but does not appear to have been fully manned or equipped before inactivating in 1949. It was activated in 1958 at Little Rock Air Force Base, Arkansas, when Strategic Air Command temporarily expanded its Boeing B-47 Stratojet wings from three to four squadrons, but was inactivated on 1 January 1962.

== History ==
=== World War II ===
==== Activation and training ====
The squadron was first organized at Gowen Field, Idaho on 1 December 1942 as one of the original four squadrons of the 384th Bombardment Group. It moved the next month to Wendover Field, Utah, where it began training with the Boeing B-17 Flying Fortress. It completed training in May 1943, and began its move to the European Theater of Operations. The ground echelon departed Sioux City Army Air Base, Iowa for the port of embarkation at Camp Kilmer, New Jersey on 10 May and sailed on the RMS Queen Elizabeth on 23 May 1943. The air echelon staged through Kearney Army Air Field Nebraska starting on 3 May and ferried their B-17s via the northern ferry route. The first planes arrived at RAF Grafton Underwood on 25 May 1943.

==== Combat in Europe ====
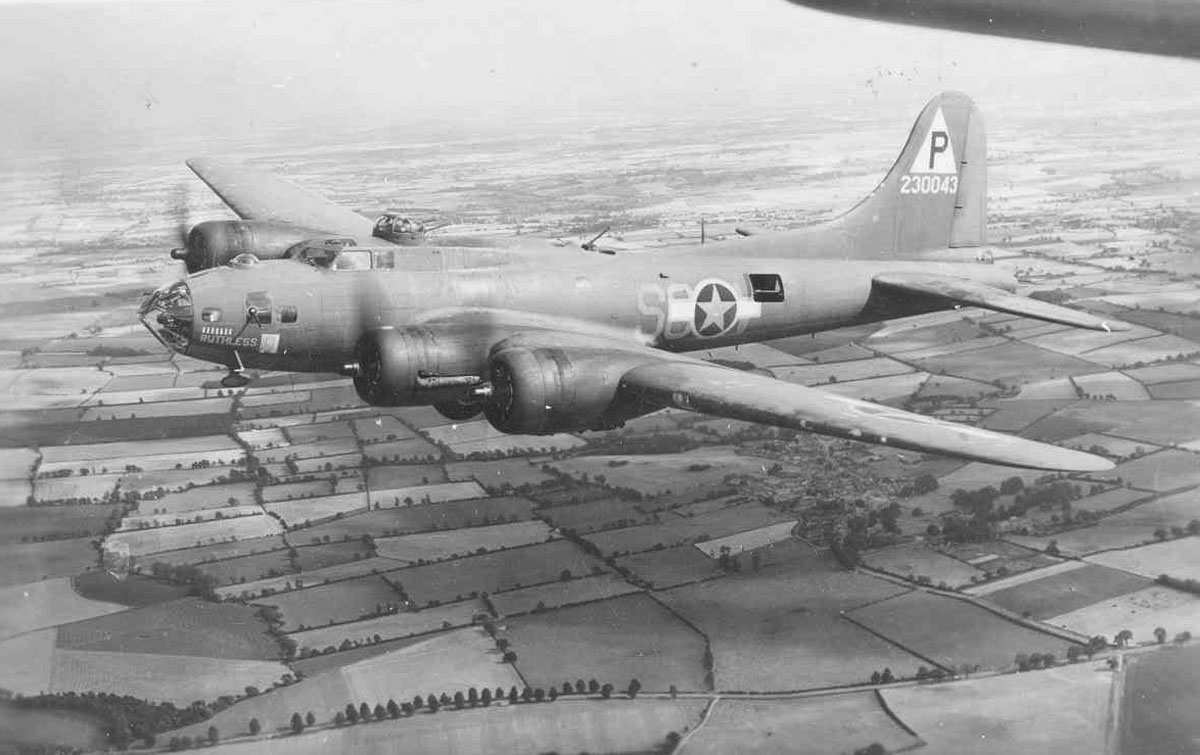
Squadron B-17 in flight (Note: Aircraft is Boeing B-17F-85-BO, serial 42-30043, SO-V, Ruthless. This plane ditched in the English Channel returning from a mission to Frankfurt on 6 October 1943 and the crew was rescued by a trawler serving as a radar picket ship. Baugher, Joe (10 April 2023). "1942 USAF Serial Numbers". Joe Baugher.)

The squadron arrived at its combat station, RAF Grafton Underwood on 6 June 1943. It flew its first mission on 23 June, a diversionary strike against the Ford and General Motors plants at Antwerp. The squadron primarily flew missions in the strategic bombing campaign against Germany, striking air bases and industrial targets in France and Germany. Targets included Orleans/Bricy and Nancy/Azelot Airfields, an engine manufacturing factory at Cologne, a coke distillation facility at Gelsenkirchen, an aircraft component plant at Halberstadt, a steel manufacturing plant at Magdeburg and the ball bearing factory at Schweinfurt.

The squadron participated in a raid on aircraft factories in Germany on 11 January 1944 for which it was awarded a Distinguished Unit Citation (DUC). This was a prelude to Big Week, a concentrated series of raids by Eighth Air Force, aimed at destroying Germany's aircraft manufacturing industry in late February. On 24 April 1944, the 384th Group, although crippled by heavy losses, led the 41st Bombardment Wing, in an attack on the Dornier Flugzeugwerke aircraft manufacturing plant at Oberpfaffenhofen, pressing the attack through almost overwhelming opposition. One group commander described the opposition on this mission as the heaviest he had seen during the war. This mission resulted in the award of a second DUC to the squadron. Other strategic targets included communications centers, oil refineries and storage facilities at Leipzig and Berlin, marshalling yards at Duren and Mannheim, and port facilities.

The squadron was occasionally diverted from the strategic bombing campaign to fly air support and interdiction missions. It attacked targets along the coast of Normandy to support Operation Overlord, continuing these attacks through D-Day, when it attacked airfields and communications facilities beyond the beachhead. On 24 and 25 July 1944, it supported Operation Cobra, the breakout at Saint Lo with attacks on strong points just beyond enemy lines. It hit armor and artillery concentrations near Eindhoven to support Operation Market Garden, the attempt to seize a bridgehead across the Rhine in the Netherlands during September 1944. It attacked enemy fortifications and communications during the Battle of the Bulge from December 1944 through January 1945. When the Allies attacked across the Rhine in Germany in March 1945, it attacked rail facilities, including marshalling yards and bridges to cut enemy supply lines.

The squadron flew its last combat mission on 25 April 1945. After V-E Day the squadron remained in Europe as part of United States Air Forces in Europe. It assisted Air Transport Command in the Green Project by flying soldiers to Casablanca, French Morocco for transport back to the United States. From its continental base at Istres Air Base, France, it flew Greek military back to their homeland, and transported displaced persons. The squadron transported American troops to Germany to serve in the military occupation forces there, but was gradually drawn down. It was inactivated in France in February 1946 and its remaining personnel and equipment were absorbed by the 306th Bombardment Group.

=== Air Force reserve ===
The 547th Squadron was reactivated as a reserve unit under Air Defense Command (ADC) at Winston-Salem Municipal Airport, North Carolina in July 1947, nominally as a Boeing B-29 Superfortress unit. The squadron was assigned to the 96th Bombardment Group, which was located at Gunter Field, Alabama. It is not clear whether or not the squadron was fully staffed or equipped. In 1948 Continental Air Command (ConAC) assumed responsibility for managing reserve and Air National Guard units from ADC. The 547th was inactivated when ConAC reorganized its reserve units under the wing base organization system in June 1949. President Truman's reduced 1949 defense budget also required reductions in the number of units in the Air Force, and the squadron was not replaced as reserve flying operations at Winston-Salem ceased.

=== Strategic Air Command ===
From 1958, the Boeing B-47 Stratojet wings of Strategic Air Command (SAC) began to assume an alert posture at their home bases, reducing the amount of time spent on alert at overseas bases. The SAC alert cycle divided itself into four parts: planning, flying, alert and rest to meet General Thomas S. Power’s initial goal of maintaining one third of SAC's planes on fifteen minute ground alert, fully fueled and ready for combat to reduce vulnerability to a Soviet missile strike. To implement this new system, B-47 wings reorganized from three to four squadrons. The 547th was activated at Little Rock Air Force Base, Arkansas as the fourth squadron of the 384th Bombardment Wing in September 1958. The SAC alert commitment was increased to half the wing's aircraft in 1962 and the four squadron pattern no longer met the alert cycle commitment, so the squadron was inactivated on 1 January 1962.

== Lineage ==
- Constituted as the 547th Bombardment Squadron (Heavy) on 25 November 1942

Activated on 1 December 1942
Redesignated 547th Bombardment Squadron, c. 20 August 1943
Inactivated on 28 February 1946
Redesignated 547th Bombardment Squadron, Very Heavy on 9 July 1947
Activated in the reserve on 16 July 1947
Inactivated on 27 June 1949
Redesignated 547th Bombardment Squadron, Medium on 11 August 1958
Activated on 1 September 1958
Discontinued and inactivated on 1 January 1962

=== Assignments ===
- 384th Bombardment Group, 1 December 1942 – 28 February 1946
- 96th Bombardment Group, 16 July 1947 – 27 June 1949
- 384th Bombardment Wing, 1 September 1958 – 1 January 1962

=== Stations ===
- Gowen Field, Idaho, 1 December 1942
- Wendover Field, Utah, 2 January 1943
- Sioux City Army Air Base, Iowa, 5 April-10 May 1943
- RAF Grafton Underwood (AAF-106), England, 4 June 1943
- Istres-Le Tubé Air Base (Y-17), France, 1 July 1945 – 28 February 1946
- Winston-Salem Municipal Airport, North Carolina, 16 July 1947 – 27 June 1949
- Little Rock Air Force Base, Arkansas, 1 September 1958 – 1 January 1962

=== Aircraft ===
- Boeing B-17 Flying Fortress, 1942–1946
- Boeing B-47 Stratojet, 1958–1961

=== Awards and campaigns ===
| Award streamer | Award | Dates | Notes |
|---|---|---|---|
| | Distinguished Unit Citation | Germany, 11 January 1944 | |
| | Distinguished Unit Citation | Germany, 24 April 1944 | |

| Campaign Streamer | Campaign | Dates | Notes |
|---|---|---|---|
| | Air Offensive, Europe | 3 June 1943 – 5 June 1944 | |
| | Air Combat, EAME Theater | 3 June 1943 – 11 May 1945 | |
| | Normandy | 6 June 1944 – 24 July 1944 | |
| | Northern France | 25 July 1944 – 14 September 1944 | |
| | Rhineland | 15 September 1944 – 21 March 1945 | |
| | Ardennes-Alsace | 16 December 1944 – 25 January 1945 | |
| | Central Europe | 22 March 1944 – 21 May 1945 | |

== See also ==
- B-17 Flying Fortress units of the United States Army Air Forces
- List of B-47 units of the United States Air Force
