= All Saints Church, Conington =

Coordinates: 52.4583°N 0.2642°W

All Saints' Church, Conington
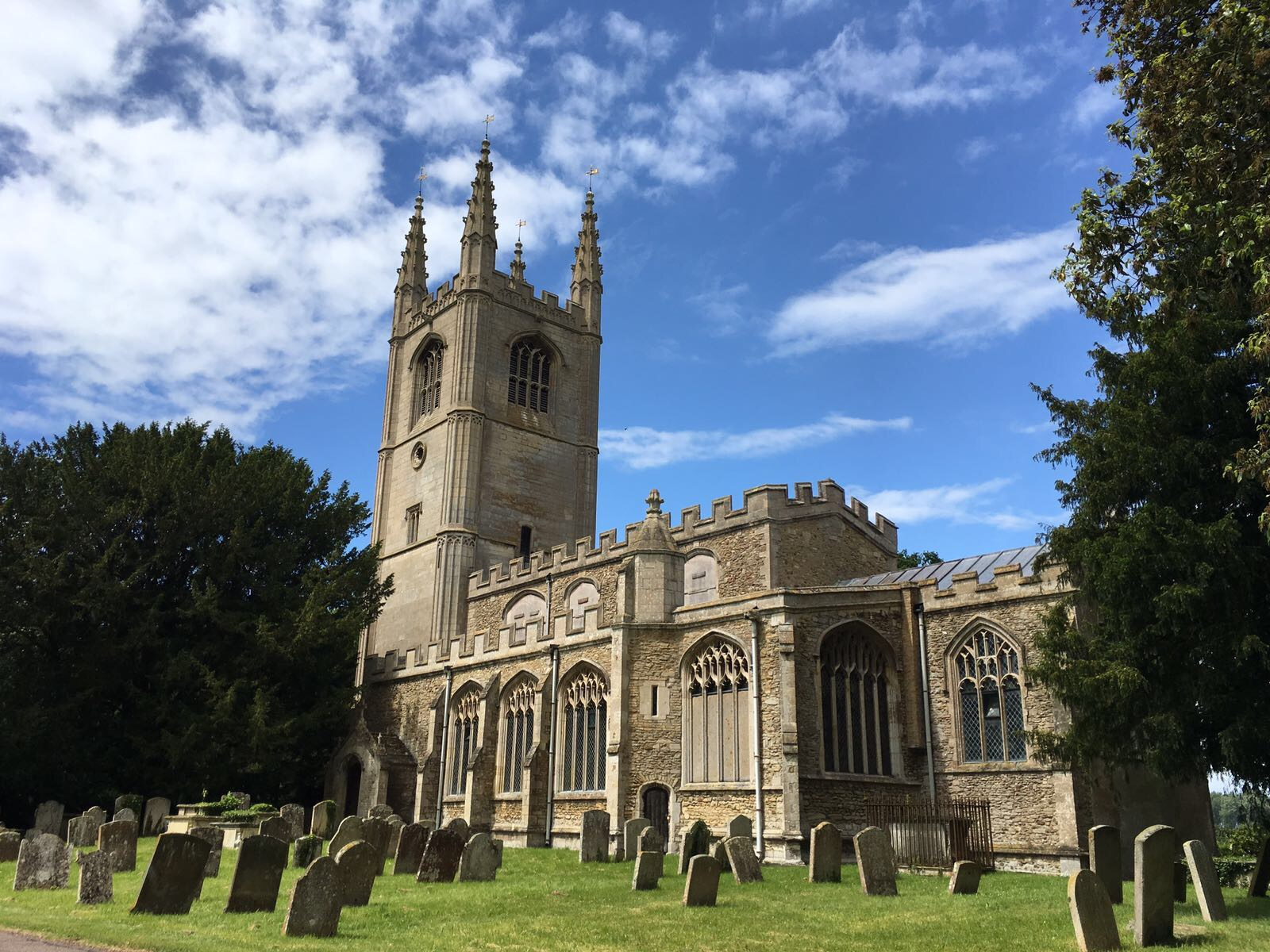
- All Saints' Church, Conington, from the south-east

- Location in Cambridgeshire
- OS grid reference: TL 179 858
- Location: Conington, Cambridgeshire
- Country: England
- Denomination: Anglican
- Website: Churches Conservation Trust

Architecture
- Functional status: Redundant
- Heritage designation: Grade I
- Designated: 28 January 1958
- Architectural type: Church
- Style: Gothic

Specifications
- Materials: Limestone and fieldstone

All Saints' Church is a redundant Church of England parish church in the village of Conington in the Huntingdonshire district of Cambridgeshire, England. It is recorded in the National Heritage List for England as a designated Grade I listed building, and is under the care of the Churches Conservation Trust. The church stands to the east of the village, between the A1 road and the East Coast Main Line.

== History ==
A church was mentioned in the Domesday Book of 1086. It was rebuilt in about 1500. The embattled parapets were restored in 1638 by Sir Thomas Cotton. In 1841 the church was restored and the pews were replaced. A new east window was added in 1852. The tower was strengthened in 1862, and further repairs were undertaken between 1897 and 1899.

== Architecture ==
=== Exterior ===
All Saints' is constructed in limestone rubble and fieldstone, with limestone dressings. Its plan consists of a four-bay nave with a clerestory, north and south aisles with chapels at their east ends, a chancel, north and south porches, and a west tower. At the east end of the south aisle is a chapel. The tower is in four stages on a plinth decorated with quatrefoil ornament. At the corners are half-octagonal turrets rising to crocketted pinnacles. The parapet is battlemented with a quatrefoil frieze and gargoyles at the centre of each side. In the bottom stage is a west arched doorway, above which is five-light window. The bell openings in the top stage have four lights. The clerestory has three three-light windows and one five-light window on each side. Along the side of the south aisle are three four-light windows. The south chapel has a four-light south window, and a five-light east window. Between the aisle and the chapel is a rood turret with a polygonal roof and a foliated finial. The south porch is shallow and gabled with a tiled roof. The chancel has three-light windows in the north and south walls and a restored east window.

=== Interior ===
Inside the church are four-bay arcades, the westernmost bays being wider than the others. In the south wall of the chancel is a three-seat sedilia and a piscina. The limestone octagonal font dates from the 15th century, and stands on a 19th-century base. In the church are monuments to the Cotton and Heathcote families. Most of the furnishings date from 1841. The organ was built by Miller and Son of Cambridge. There is a ring of six bells, all cast by Thomas Mears II of the Whitechapel Bell Foundry, five of them in 1827, and the sixth in 1834. The clock is dated 1801 and is by Vulliamy of London.

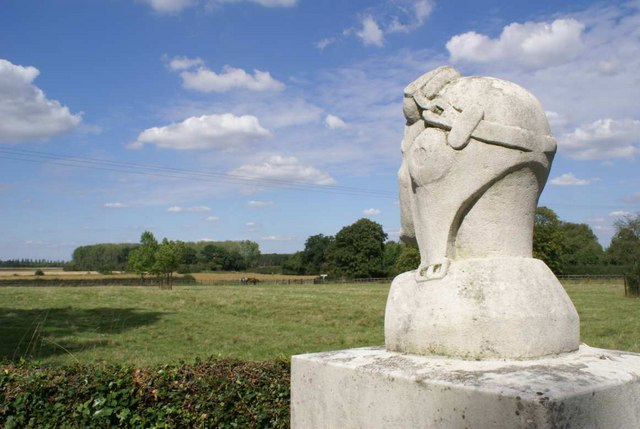
American Aircrew Memorial, looking towards RAF Glatton
