= 748th Bombardment Squadron =

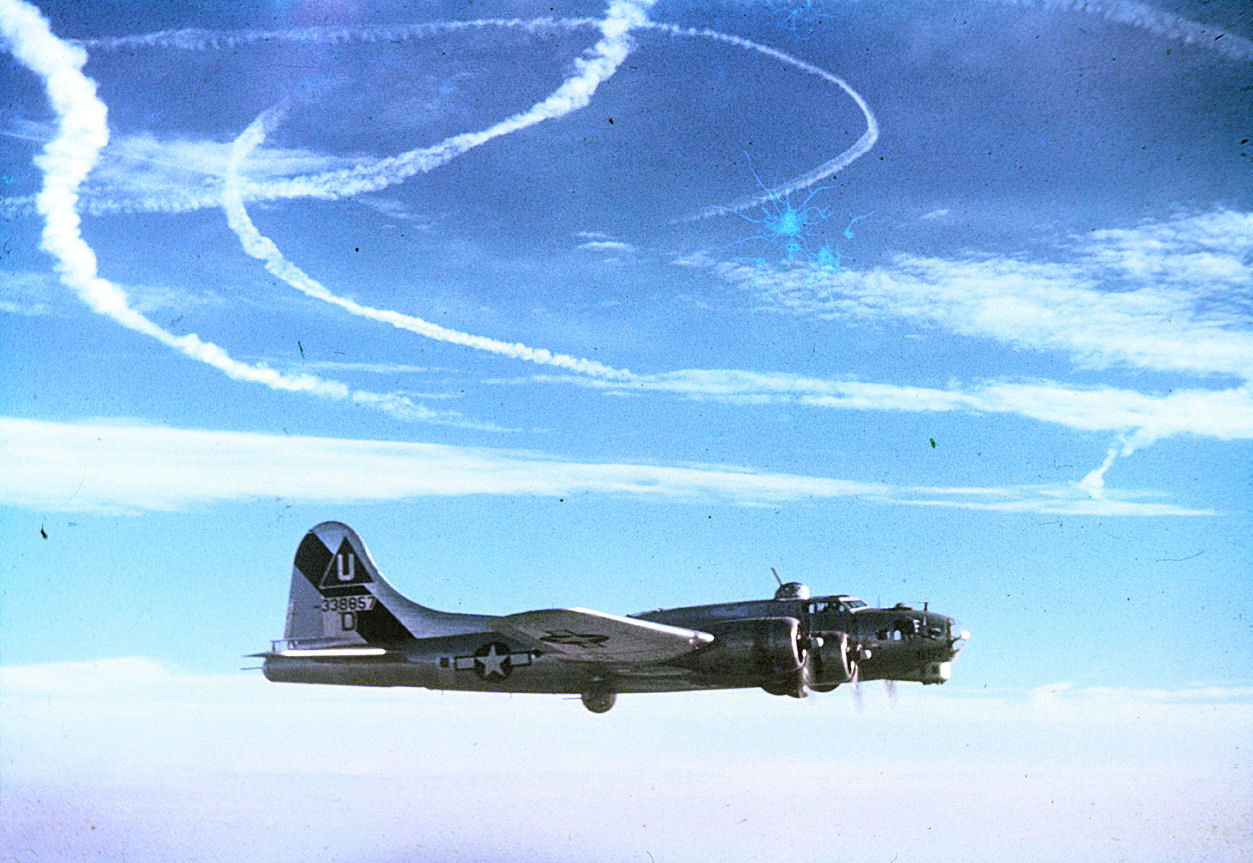
- 457th Bombardment Group B-17 Flying Fortress (Note: Airplane is Boeing B-17G-95-BO Flying Fortress, serial 43-38857. This plane survived the war. It was transferred to storage at Kingman Army Air Field on 28 November 1945 and sold for scrap in July 1946. Baugher, Joe (14 May 2023). "1943 USAF Serial Numbers". Joe Baugher.)
- Active: 1943–1945
- Country: United States
- Branch: United States Air Force
- Role: Heavy bomber
- Engagements: European Theater of Operations

Insignia
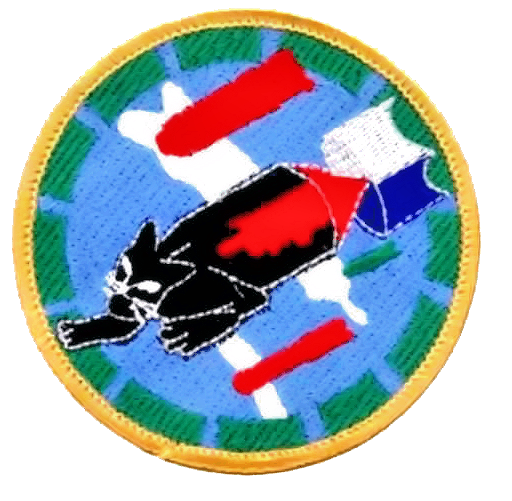
- Patch with 748th Bombardment Squadron emblem (Note: Approved 15 August 1944. Description: Over and through a light blue disc, broken line segment border medium green, a large red aerial bomb falling toward dexter base, tail fins in graduated shades of gray and blue, nose taking the form of the head and shoulders of a black leopard, with expression of anger on face, between a red violet aerial bomb in dexter chief, and a yellow green and red violet aerial bomb in sinister base, all in front of two white cloud formations.)

The 748th Bombardment Squadron is a former United States Army Air Forces unit. The squadron was first activated in July 1943. After training in the United States, it deployed to the European Theater of Operations, where it participated in the strategic bombing campaign against Germany. Following V-E Day, the squadron returned to the United States and was inactivated in August 1945.

== History ==
=== Training in the United States ===
The 748th Bombardment Squadron was activated at Geiger Field, Washington on 1 July 1943 as one of the four squadrons of the 457th Bombardment Group. It moved a week later to Rapid City Army Air Base, South Dakota, where it began training with the Boeing B-17 Flying Fortress heavy bomber and completed the first two phases of training there. It completed its training at Ephrata Army Air Base, Washington, then moved to Wendover Field, Utah for final preparation for overseas movement. It departed for the European Theater of Operations on New Years Day, 1944.

=== Combat in Europe ===
The squadron assembled at its combat station, RAF Glatton by the end of the month. The air echelon had begun arriving at Glatton on 21 January. The squadron flew its first missions during Big Week, the concentrated attack by Eighth Air Force on the German aircraft manufacturing industry, on 21 February 1944. It engaged primarily in the strategic bombing campaign against Germany, attacking ball bearing plants, oil refineries and aircraft factories until June 1944. In July 1944, the squadron returned to strategic targets, which remained its primary objectives through April 1945. During a raid on 2 November 1944, a two group formation including the squadron strayed from the main bomber stream and its fighter cover. Luftwaffe fighter controllers directed a geschwader of interceptors against the formation. Nine of the 457th Group's Flying Fortresses were lost to this attack.

In June 1944, the squadron was diverted from its strategic mission to prepare for Operation Overlord, the invasion of France. On D Day, it attacked coastal defenses on the Cherbourg Peninsula. For the remainder of the month it was engaged in air interdiction, striking airfields, rail systems and roads and depots behind enemy lines. The squadron was also diverted to tactical targets for shorter periods. In July 1944, it supported Operation Cobra, the breakout of ground forces at Saint Lo. During Operation Market Garden, the attempt to secure bridgeheads across the Rhine River in the Netherlands, it supported the British 1st Airborne Division. It provided similar support during the Battle of the Bulge in December 1944 and January 1945, and Operation Varsity, the airborne assault across the Rhine in March 1945.

The squadron flew its last combat mission on 20 April 1945. Following V-E Day, it transported prisoners of war from Austria to France. The air echelon departed Glatton between 19 and 23 May, while the ground echelon sailed on the RMS Queen Elizabeth on 24 June, arriving at the New York Port of Emarkation five days later. It assembled at Sioux Falls Army Air Field, South Dakota in late July. It was inactivated there the following month.

== Lineage ==
- Constituted as the 748th Bombardment Squadron (Heavy) on 19 May 1943

Activated on 1 July 1943
Redesignated 748th Bombardment Squadron, Heavy c. 20 August 1943
Inactivated on 28 August 1945

=== Assignments ===
- 457th Bombardment Group, 1 July 1943 – 28 August 1945

=== Stations ===
- Geiger Field, Washington, 1 July 1943
- Rapid City Army Air Base, South Dakota, 9 July 1943
- Ephrata Army Air Base, Washington, 28 October 1943
- Wendover Field, Utah, 6 December 1943 – 1 January 1944
- RAF Glatton, (Station 130) England, 28 January 1944 – c. 1 June 1945
- Sioux Falls Army Air Field, South Dakota, c. 20 July–28 August 1945

=== Aircraft ===
- Boeing B-17 Flying Fortress, 1943–1945

=== Campaigns ===
Campaign Streamer	Campaign	Dates	Notes
	Air Offensive, Europe	28 January 1944 – 5 June 1944	
	Normandy	6 June 1944 – 24 July 1944	
	Northern France	25 July 1944 – 14 September 1944	
	Rhineland	15 September 1944 – 21 March 1945	
	Ardennes-Alsace	16 December 1944 – 25 January 1945	
	Central Europe	22 March 1944 – 21 May 1945	

== See also ==
- B-17 Flying Fortress units of the United States Army Air Forces
