= Connington South rail crash =

1967 deliberate train wreck in Huntingdonshire, England

Coordinates: 52.44628°N 0.23524°W

Details
- Date: 5 March 1967; 23:36
- Location: Conington [sic], Huntingdonshire
- Country: England
- Line: East Coast Main Line
- Cause: Signalling error (likely deliberate)

Statistics
- Trains: 1
- Passengers: 147
- Deaths: 5
- Injured: 18

The Connington South rail crash occurred on 5 March 1967 on the East Coast Main Line near the village of Conington, Huntingdonshire, England. Five passengers were killed and 18 were injured.

The 22:30 express from King's Cross to Edinburgh, hauled by D9004 The Queens Own Highlander, was travelling along the Down Fast line at around 75 mph when the rear portion of the train was derailed to the left. The last four coaches came to rest on their sides and two others were derailed.

== Investigation ==
The formal accident investigation was undertaken by Lieutenant Colonel I. K. A. McNaughton of the Railway Inspectorate. The investigation determined that the interlocking showed that the Home signal had been at Danger when the accident occurred. However, the driver and secondman of the train stated that it was displaying Green until it passed out of their line of sight. Just beyond the Home signal there were points for controlling movements from the Down Fast to the Down Goods line, and it was on these that the train was derailed. The points were locked in position by two means:

- A standard mechanical lock, operated by a lever in the lever frame. It could not be released unless the Home signal was at Danger.
- An electrical lock, which engaged if a track circuit just beyond the Home signal was occupied by a train.

No fault was found with either the track or the train.

Immediately after the accident, 20-year-old signalman Alan Frost claimed that he had accidentally changed the points while "swinging" on the levers. Initially, the investigation was unable to determine any cause for the derailment as there was no apparent explanation found from the evidence of the train crew and signalman or in the signalling system, permanent way or mechanical systems of the train.

The Railway Inspectorate inquiry into the accident surmised that, as the train approached Connington South signal box, the signalman had:

1. Replaced the Home signal to Danger just as the locomotive reached it.
2. Pulled the point lock lever to withdraw the mechanical lock.
3. Raised the latch of the point lever just before the electrical lock operated.

This sequence would have had to occur in the time between the train passing the Home signal and running on to the track circuit, i.e. in less than two seconds. Tests were conducted using a similar signalling frame to the one at Connington South and it was found that an experienced signalman could just about manage to reproduce the sequence. Thus, it was shown that the interlocking could be defeated.

It was clear that the signalman had stood for some seconds with the points lever slightly out of its frame, moved it just as the sixth coach was passing over it, then returned it to its normal position. This would be a premeditated rather than an accidental act.

== Consequences ==
The signalman had entered the railway service in January 1965 after serving with the Royal Marines. He had been discharged after suffering from "hysteria and immature personality", but this was not known to the railway management at the time, even though his references had been taken up.

He was tried on charges of manslaughter and endangering the safety of railway passengers in November 1968. After a trial lasting 11 days, the judge instructed the jury to acquit him on the charges of manslaughter and sentenced him to two years' imprisonment for unlawfully operating the signal and points mechanism of the Connington South signal box so as to endanger persons being conveyed on a railway, on which charge the signalman had changed his plea to guilty. Frost is not recorded as offering any explanation for his actions.

== See also ==
- Audenshaw Junction rail crash

== Bibliography ==
- I K A McNaughton (1969). Railway accident : report on the derailment that occurred on 5th March, 1967 at Connington South in the Eastern Region British Railways (PDF) (Report). Ministry of Transport. ISBN 0-11-550079-0.
- Atkin, Courtney (2002). A Significant Accident. Unpfront Publishing LTD. ISBN 978-1-84426-046-1.
