= Conington, Huntingdonshire =

Village in Cambridgeshire, England

Coordinates: 52.45831°N 0.27°W

Conington
- Location within Cambridgeshire
- Population: 209 (2011)
- OS grid reference: TL176860
- District: Huntingdonshire
- Shire county: Cambridgeshire
- Region: East
- Country: England
- Sovereign state: United Kingdom
- Post town: Peterborough
- Postcode district: PE7
- Police: Cambridgeshire
- Fire: Cambridgeshire
- Ambulance: East of England
- UK Parliament: North West Cambridgeshire

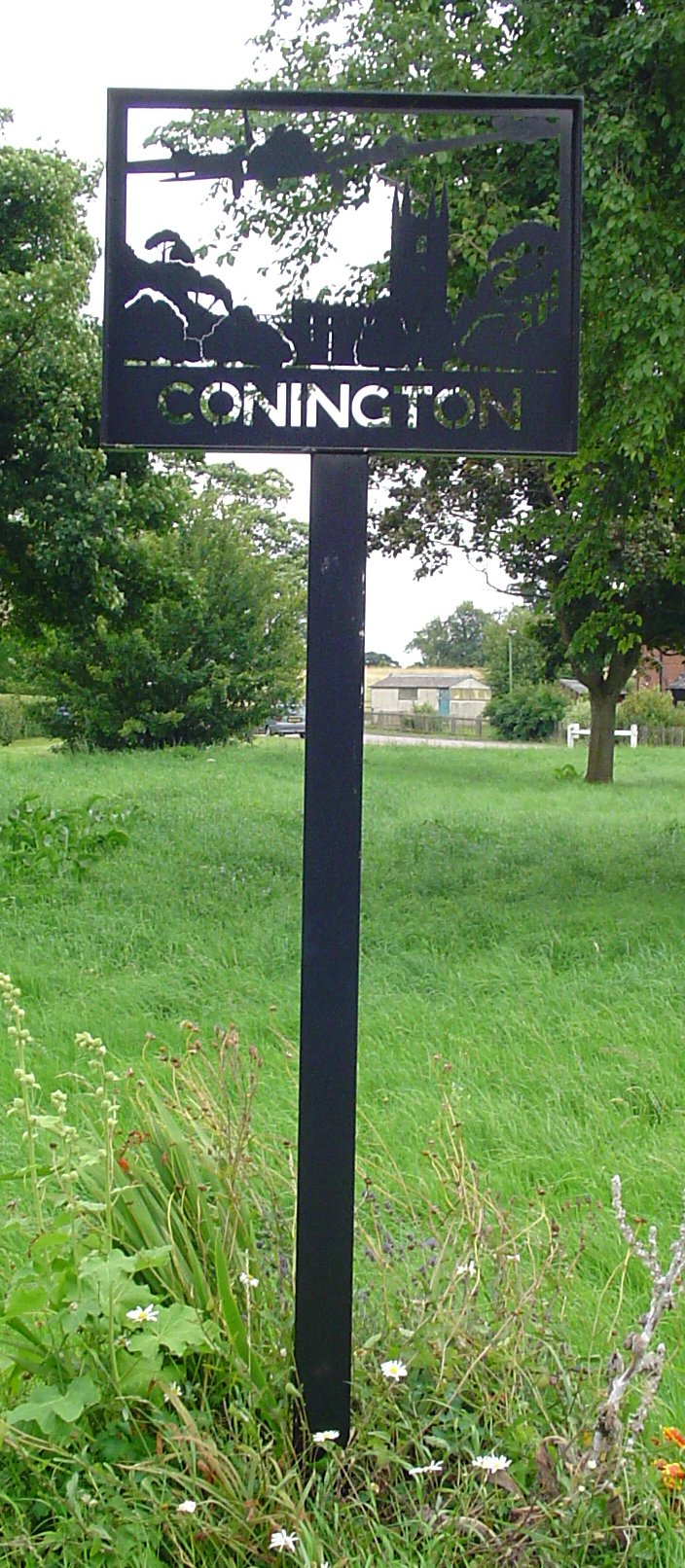
Village sign in Conington

Conington (Conington All Saints, or "Conington-juxta-Petriburg") is a village and civil parish in the Huntingdonshire district of Cambridgeshire, England. Conington lies about 6 miles (10 km) south of Peterborough and 2 miles (3 km) north of Sawtry. It is near the A1(M), part of the Great North Road, which follows the course of the Roman Ermine Street. Conington lies within Huntingdonshire, which was once one of the historic counties of England.

== History ==
Conington was listed in the Domesday Book of 1086, in the Hundred of Normancross in Huntingdonshire; the name of the settlement was written Coninctune in the Domesday Book, when there was just one manor at Conington; the annual rent paid to the lord of the manor in 1066 had been £9 and the rent was the same in 1086.

The Domesday Book also records that there were 27 households at Conington. Estimates for the average size of a household at that time range from 3.5 to 5.0 people. These yield population estimates of 94–135. The survey records there was an area of 15 ploughlands at Conington in 1086. In addition to the arable land, there were some 40 acres (16 hectares) of meadow. The total tax assessment for the manor at Conington was nine geld. By 1086 there was already a church and a priest.

The Cotton Baronetcy of Conington was created in the Baronetage of England on 29 June 1611 for the antiquary Robert Bruce Cotton (1570–1631), who also represented five constituencies in the House of Commons. The novelist, expurgator and editor Henrietta Maria Bowdler was born in Conington in 1750.

In the Second World War, Conington was located next to Royal Air Force Station Glatton. RAF Glatton was constructed to Class "A" standards to support heavy bombers in 1943, as it was to be used by the US Army Air Forces. The 457th Bombardment Group (Heavy) arrived on 21 January 1944. The recognisable tail code of the 457th was the "triangle U" painted on the vertical stabilizers of the Boeing B-17 Flying Fortresses which operated from the air base. The 457th Bomb Group operated from RAF Glatton from January 1944 until 20 April 1945, when it completed its 237th and last combat mission at the conclusion of the war. In All Saints' Church is a memorial to the 457th Bomb Group.

== Governance ==
As a civil parish, Conington has an elected parish council. It consists of five members. Conington was in the historic and administrative county of Huntingdonshire until 1965. From 1965, it became part of the new administrative county of Huntingdon and Peterborough. Then in 1974, following the Local Government Act 1972, Conington became part of the county of Cambridgeshire, with Huntingdonshire District Council as its second tier. Conington lies in the district ward of Sawtry. It is represented on the district council by two councillors as part of the electoral division of Sawtry and Ellington, and is represented on the county council by one councillor. It lies in the parliamentary constituency of North West Cambridgeshire. The member has been Sam Carling (Labour) since 2024.

== Demography ==
=== Population ===
The historical UK census population of Conington in the period 1801 to 1901 ranged between 154 in 1801 and 319 in 1851. The subsequent ten-year census results were as follows:

Parish	1911	1921	1931	1951	1961	1971	1981	1991	2001	2011
Conington	261	259	245	348	290	247	219	209	216	209

All population census figures have been taken from the report Historic Census figures Cambridgeshire to 2011 by Cambridgeshire Insight. In 2011, the parish covered an area of 3,173 acres (1,284 hectares), so that the population density for Conington in 2011 was 42.2 per square mile (16.3 per km^{2}).

== Level crossing ==
The nearby level crossings and sidings have suffered several railway accidents, notably the Connington South rail crash of 1967, which caused five deaths. A former Mayor of Peterborough, Arthur Mellows, was killed at Connington North level crossing, when his car was hit by a train on 16 October 1948. On 1 March 1948, a train struck a lorry at Connington North, causing six deaths. The Connington North level crossing is 68 miles 28 chains from King's Cross on the East Coast Main Line. The crossing has three lines.

== See also ==
- Conington Castle
- RAF Glatton
