= 457th Air Expeditionary Group =

457th Air Expeditionary Group

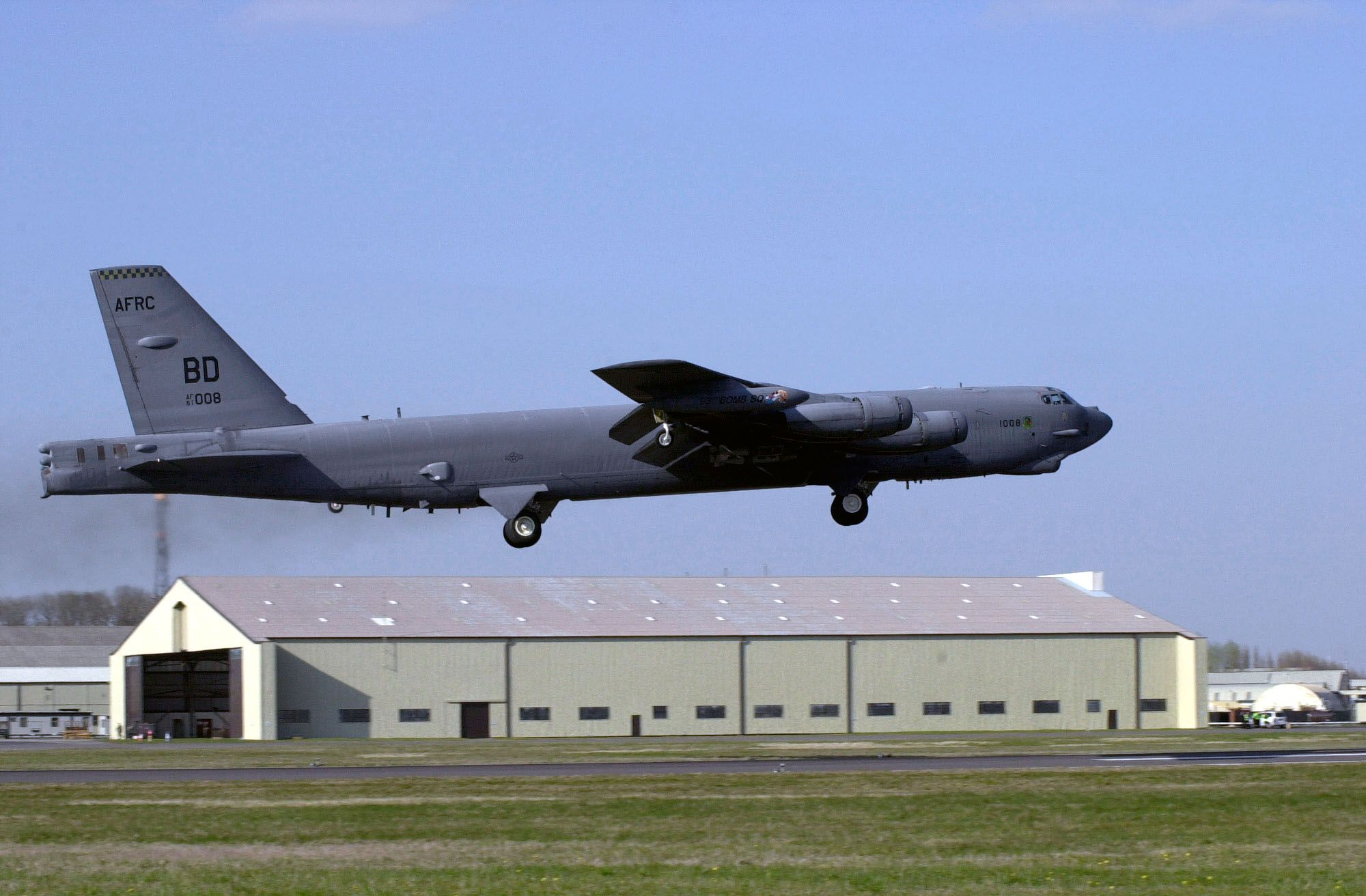
- A B-52H Stratofortress takes off from the 457th Group's base in April 2003 (Note: This airplane was deployed from the Air Force Reserve Command's 917th Wing. It was equipped with the Litening 2 pod for laser-guided bomb delivery. The aircrew was deployed for Operation Iraqi Freedom.)
- Active: 1943–1945; 1993–1994; 2003
- Country: United States
- Branch: United States Air Force
- Role: expeditionary operations
- Part of: United States Air Forces Europe
- Nickname: The Fireball Outfit
- Motto: Fait Accompli French Mission Accomplished
- Engagements: European Theater of Operations; Operation Iraqi Freedom
- Decorations: Air Force Outstanding Unit Award wilth Combat "V" Device; Air Force Outstanding Unit Award

Insignia
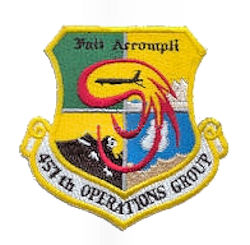
- 457th Air Expeditionary Group emblem

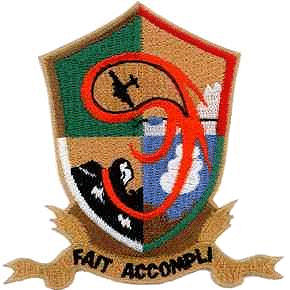
- 457th Bombardment Group emblem
- World War II Tail Code: Triangle with U

The United States Air Force's 457th Air Expeditionary Group is a provisional United States Air Force unit assigned to United States Air Forces in Europe to activate or inactivate as needed. It has been activated to support Operation Iraqi Freedom, joint operations with the Tanzania Air Force Command and for Operation Odyssey Dawn.

The group was activated during World War II as the 457th Bombardment Group. It flew Boeing B-17 Flying Fortress from England, entering the strategic bombing campaign during Big Week. It flew 7,086 sorties before returning to the United States for inactivation in the summer of 1945. It was again active from 1993 to 1994 as the 457th Operations Group, controlling Air Mobility Command's air refueling operations at Altus Air Force Base, Oklahoma. The 457th was converted to provisional status in 2001.

== History ==
=== World War II ===
==== Training in the United States ====
The 457th Bombardment Group was activated at Geiger Field, Washington on 1 July 1943 with the 748th, 749th, 750th and 751st Bombardment Squadrons assigned. It moved a week later to Rapid City Army Air Base, South Dakota, where it began training with the Boeing B-17 Flying Fortress heavy bomber and completed the first two phases of its training there. It completed its training at Ephrata Army Air Base, Washington, then moved to Wendover Field, Utah for final preparation for overseas movement. It departed for the European Theater of Operations on New Years Day, 1944.

==== Combat in Europe ====
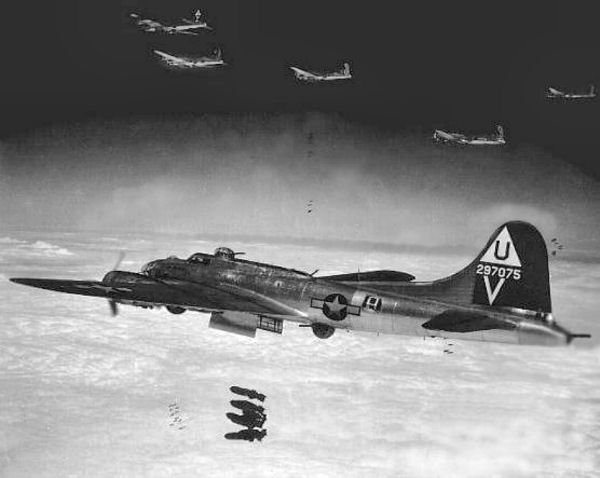
B-17s of the 457th Bomb Group attacking a target (Note: The aircraft in the foreground is Boeing B-17G-40-BO Flying Fortress, serial 42-97075 "Flak Dodger" of the 750th Bombardment Squadron. This plane survived the war and returned to the USA in June 1945. It is also featured on the covers of both The Fireball Outfit and Ready or Not: Into the Wild Blue.)

The group assembled at its combat station, RAF Glatton by the end of the month. The air echelon had begun arriving at Glatton on 21 January. The group flew its first mission during Big Week on 21 February 1944, as Eighth Air Force concentrated its attacks on Germany's aircraft manufacturing industry. It engaged primarily in the strategic bombing campaign against Germany, attacking ball bearing plants, oil refineries and aircraft factories until June 1944. In July 1944, the group returned to strategic targets, which remained its primary objectives through April 1945. On 2 November 1944, the 457th and another group strayed from the main bomber stream and its fighter cover. Luftwaffe fighter controllers directed a geschwader of interceptors against the formation. Nine of the 457th Group's Flying Fortresses were lost to this attack.

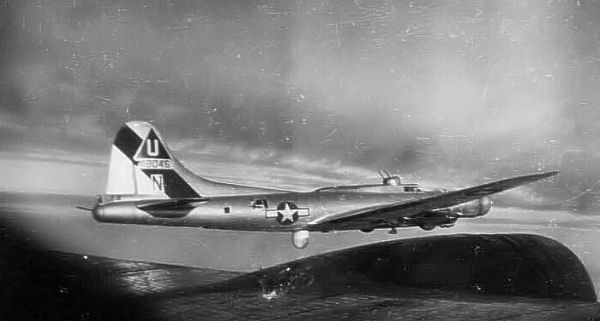
B-17G "Queen Bea" of the 751st Bomb Squadron (Note: Aircraft is Douglas built Boeing B-17G-25-DL Flying Fortress, serial 42-38056 "Queen Bea". Queen Bea was returning from a mission to Rouen, France on 22 June 1944 and was badly shot up from flak with no hydraulic system. After landing, the plane swerved out of control and collided with a B-17G named "Arf & Arf", serial 42-38064.)

In June 1944, the group was diverted from its strategic mission to prepare for Operation Overlord, the invasion of France. On D Day, it attacked coastal defenses on the Cherbourg Peninsula. For the remainder of the month it was engaged in air interdiction, striking airfields, rail systems and roads and depots behind enemy lines. The group was also diverted to tactical targets for shorter periods. In July 1944, it supported Operation Cobra the breakout of ground forces at Saint Lo. During Operation Market Garden, the attempt to secure bridgeheads across the Rhine River in the Netherlands, it supported the British 1st Airborne Division. It provided similar support during the Battle of the Bulge in December 1944 and January 1945, and Operation Varsity, the airborne assault across the Rhine in March 1945.

The group flew its last combat mission on 20 April 1945. In fourteen months in combat, the group had flown 7086 sorties. It claimed the destruction of 33 enemy aircraft, but lost 83 Flying Fortresses. Following V-E Day, it transported prisoners of war from Austria to France. The air echelon departed Glatton between 19 and 23 May, while the ground echelon sailed on the RMS Queen Elizabeth on 24 June, arriving at the New York Port of Emarkation five days later. It assembled at Sioux Falls Army Air Field, South Dakota in late July. It was inactivated there the following month.

==== Empire State Building accident ====
On Saturday, 28 July 1945, Lieutenant Colonel William F. Smith lost his way while ferrying a 457th North American B-25 Mitchell bomber from Bedford Army Air Base to Sioux Falls via Newark Airport. Emerging from low cloud at about 900 feet (270 m) Smith found himself among the skyscrapers of Midtown Manhattan. His aircraft crashed headlong into the 79th floor level of the Empire State Building, killing Smith, two passengers and eleven office workers. The B-25 exploded on impact spraying burning fuel into 34th Street below, one of the engines completely passing through the building and out the other side.

=== Air refueling operations ===
On 1 July 1993, Air Mobility Command (AMC) transferred its crew training mission at Altus Air Force Base, Oklahoma to Air Education and Training Command (AETC). Although the 97th Air Mobility Wing remained the host at Altus, it became an AETC wing. The two operational air refueling squadrons at Altus, the 11th and 306th Air Refueling Squadrons, and their Boeing KC-135R Stratotankers were transferred to the reactivated 457th Operations Group. The 457th's squadrons deployed personnel and aircraft to Aviano Air Base, Italy, and Incirlik Air Base, Turkey to support Operation Northern and Operation Southern Watch duties as the lead tanker unit. The 11th Squadron was inactivated in August 1994, while the group and the 306th Squadron remained active until 1 October 1994.

=== Expeditionary operations ===
The group was converted to provisional status as the 457th Air Expeditionary Group in February 2001 and assigned to United States Air Forces in Europe to activate or inactivate as needed.

In the spring of 2003, the group was activated at RAF Fairford to support approximately a dozen Boeing B-52 Stratofortresses deployed from Minot Air Force Base, North Dakota, bombing Iraq War targets. While at Fairford, the bombers flew 120 sorties, both bombing and leaflet dropping. On a sortie flown on 11 April 2003, a 457th crew deployed from the 917th Wing at Barksdale Air Force Base, Louisiana used the Litening II precision targeting pod system, which uses a laser designator to "paint" targets. Although the system had been used by other platforms, this was its first use in combat by a B-52 The bombers returned to North Dakota on 24 April, but elements of the group remained behind to secure materiel, including unexpended munitions.

==== Tanzania ====
The group was activated for three months in 2008 at Dar es Salaam Tanzania. During this time, it had an air control squadron and an air base squadron assigned.

==== Operation Odyssey Dawn ====
In 2011, the group was briefly active at Naval Station Rota, Spain to support Operation Odyssey Dawn, the enforcement of a no fly zone over Libya.

== Lineage ==
- Established as the 457th Bombardment Group (Heavy) on 19 May 1943

Activated on 1 July 1943
Redesignated 457th Bombardment Group, Heavy c. 1944
Inactivated on 28 August 1945

- Redesignated 457th Operations Group and activated on 1 July 1993

Inactivated on 1 October 1994

- Redesignated 457th Air Expeditionary Group and converted to provisional status on 5 February 2001
- Activated c. 1 February 2003

Inactivated c. 31 May 2003

- Activated 30 January 2008

Inactivated 4 May 2008

- Activated c. March 2011

Inactivated c. April 2011

=== Assignments ===
- II Bomber Command, 4 July 1943
- 94th Combat Bombardment Wing, 21 January 1944
- VIII Fighter Command, 18 June 1945
- Second Air Force, 20 July–28 August 1945
- 19th Air Refueling Wing, 1 July 1993 – 1 October 1994
- United States Air Forces in Europe to activate or inactivate at any time after 5 February 2001

16th Air Expeditionary Task Force, c. 1 February–c. 31 May 2003
Attached to Third Air Force, 30 January–4 May 2008
313th Air Expeditionary Wing, c. March–c. April 2011

=== Operational Components ===
- 11th Air Refueling Squadron: 1 July 1993 – 1 October 1994
- 23d Expeditionary Bomb Squadron: c. 21 February 2003 – c. 24 April 2003
- 306th Air Refueling Squadron: 1 July 1993 – 1 October 1994
- 603d Expeditionary Air Control Squadron, 30 January 2008 – 4 May 2008
- 748th Bombardment Squadron: 4 July 1943 – 28 August 1945
- 749th Bombardment Squadron: 4 July 1943 – 28 August 1945
- 750th Bombardment Squadron: 4 July 1943 – 28 August 1945
- 751st Bombardment Squadron: 4 July 1943 – 28 August 1945

=== Stations ===
- Geiger Field, Washington, 4 July 1943
- Rapid City Army Air Base, South Dakota, 9 July 1943
- Ephrata Army Air Base, Washington, 28 October 1943
- Wendover Field, Utah, 4 December 1943 – 1 January 1944
- RAF Glatton (Station 130), England, 22 January 1944 – 1 June 1945
- Sioux Falls Army Air Field, South Dakota, 20 July–28 August 1945
- Altus AFB, Oklahoma, 1 July 1993 – 1 October 1994
- RAF Fairford, England, c. 1 February–c. 31 May 2003
- Dar es Salaam, Tanzania, 30 January–4 May 2008
- Naval Station Rota Spain, c. March–c. April 2011

=== Aircraft ===
- Boeing B-17G Flying Fortress 1943–1945
- Boeing KC-135R Stratotanker, 1993–1994, 2011
- Boeing B-52H Stratofortress, 2003

=== Awards and campaigns ===
Award streamer	Award	Dates	Notes
	Air Force Outstanding Unit Award with Combat "V" Device	1 February 2003–31 May 2003	457th Air Expeditionary Group
	Air Force Outstanding Unit Award	1 July 1993-30 June 1994	457th Operations Group

Campaign Streamer	Campaign	Dates	Notes
	Air Offensive, Europe	28 January 1944 – 5 June 1944	457th Bombardment Group
	Normandy	6 June 1944 – 24 July 1944	457th Bombardment Group
	Northern France	25 July 1944 – 14 September 1944	457th Bombardment Group
	Rhineland	15 September 1944 – 21 March 1945	457th Bombardment Group
	Ardennes-Alsace	16 December 1944 – 25 January 1945	457th Bombardment Group
	Central Europe	22 March 1944 – 21 May 1945	457th Bombardment Group

== See also ==
- List of United States Air Force Groups
- B-17 Flying Fortress units of the United States Army Air Forces
