= RAF Glatton =

Former RAF station in Cambridgeshire, England

RAF Glatton USAAF Station 130
- Near Huntingdon, Cambridgeshire in England
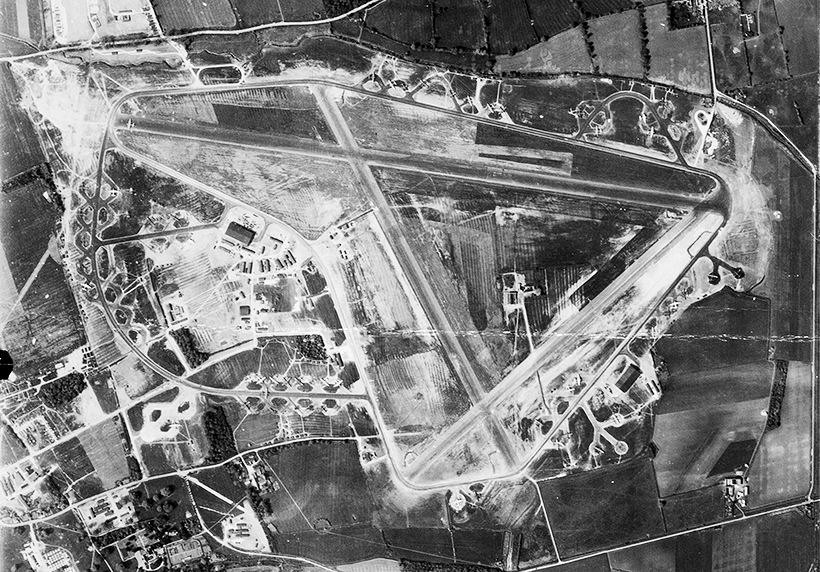
- Glatton airfield, 9 May 1944.

Site information
- Type: Royal Air Force station
- Code: GT
- Owner: Air Ministry
- Operator: Royal Air Force; United States Army Air Forces
- Controlled by: RAF Bomber Command; Eighth Air Force

Location
- Shown within Cambridgeshire RAF Glatton (the United Kingdom)
- Coordinates: 52°27′58″N 000°15′07″W

Site history
- Built: 1943
- In use: 1943-1948
- Battles/wars: European Theatre of World War II; Air Offensive, Europe July 1942 - May 1945

Garrison information
- Occupants: No. 3 Group RAF; 457th Bombardment Group

Airfield information
Runways
Direction	Length and surface
00/00
00/00
00/00

Royal Air Force Glatton or more simply RAF Glatton is a former Royal Air Force station located 10 miles (16 km) north of Huntingdon, Cambridgeshire, England.

== History ==
=== United States Army Air Forces use ===
When completed in late 1943, the facility was placed under the jurisdiction of the Eighth Air Force, United States Army Air Forces. Glatton was assigned USAAF designation Station 130.

USAAF Station Units assigned to RAF Glatton were:

- 468th Sub-Depot
- 18th Weather Squadron
- 88th Station Complement Squadron
- 1061st Military Police Company
- 1212th Quartermaster Company
- 1790th Ordnance Supply & Maintenance Company
- 860th Chemical Company
- 2100th Engineer Fire Fighting Platoon

==== 457th Bombardment Group (Heavy) ====
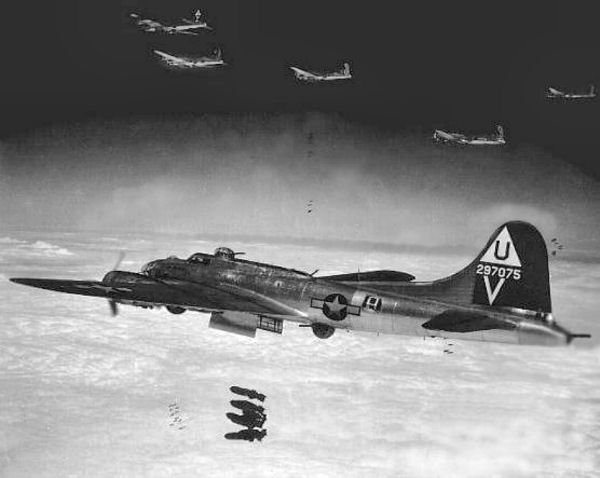
B-17s of the 457th BG. In foreground is Boeing B-17G of the 750th Bomb Sqn

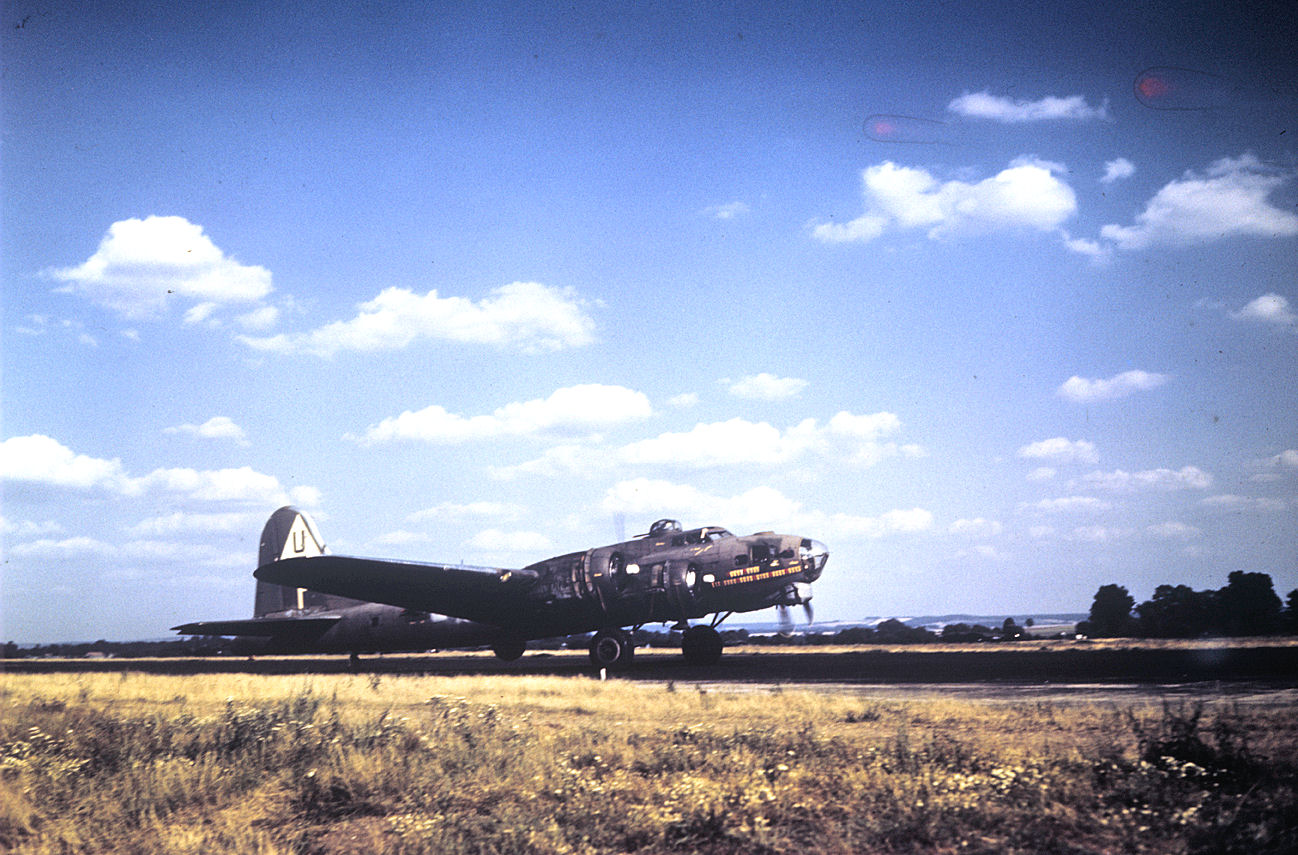
A B-17F Flying Fortress of the 750th Bomb Squadron, 457th Bomb Group

The airfield was first used by the 457th Bombardment Group (Heavy), arriving from Wendover AAF, Utah on 21 January 1944. The 457th was assigned to the 94th Combat Bombardment Wing of the 1st Bombardment Division. Its tail code was Triangle U.

The 457th Bomb Group consisted of the following operational squadrons flying Boeing B-17 Flying Fortresses :

- 748th Bombardment Squadron (Red propeller hubs)
- 749th Bombardment Squadron (Blue propeller hubs)
- 750th Bombardment Squadron (White propeller hubs)
- 751st Bombardment Squadron (Yellow propeller hubs)

The 457th Bomb Group flew its first combat mission on 21 February 1944 during Big Week, taking part in the concentrated attacks of heavy bombers on the German aircraft industry. Until June 1944, the Group engaged primarily in bombardment of strategic targets, such as ball-bearing plants, aircraft factories, and oil refineries in Germany and Occupied Europe.

The Group bombed targets in Occupied France during the first week of June 1944 in preparation for the Normandy invasion, and attacked coastal defenses along the Cherbourg peninsula on D-Day in support of airborne forces who had landed on the peninsula. It struck airfields, railroads, fuel depots, and other interdictory targets behind the invasion beaches throughout the remainder of the month.

Beginning in July 1944, the 457th resumed bombardment of strategic objectives and engaged chiefly in such operations until April 1945. Sometimes flew support and interdictory missions, aiding the advance of ground forces during the Saint-Lô breakthrough in July 1944 and the landing of British 1st Airborne Division at Arnhem during the airborne attack on the Netherlands in September 1944; and participating in the Battle of the Bulge, December 1944 - January 1945, and the assault across the Rhine in March 1945.

The Group flew its last combat mission on 20 April 1945. The unit had carried out 237 missions. Total number of sorties was 7,086 with nearly 17,000 tons of bombs and 142 tons of leaflets being dropped.

After V-E Day, the 457th transported prisoners of war from Austria to France, and returned to Sioux Falls AAF, South Dakota during June 1945 and was inactivated on 18 August 1945.

=== RAF Bomber Command use ===
After the war, RAF Glatton was used by the RAF's No. 3 Group under the control of RAF Bomber Command using Avro Lancasters and Consolidated Liberators flying to the Middle East. It was closed and sold in 1948.

The site was used by No. 273 Maintenance Unit RAF and Station Flight, RAF Glatton.

== Current use ==
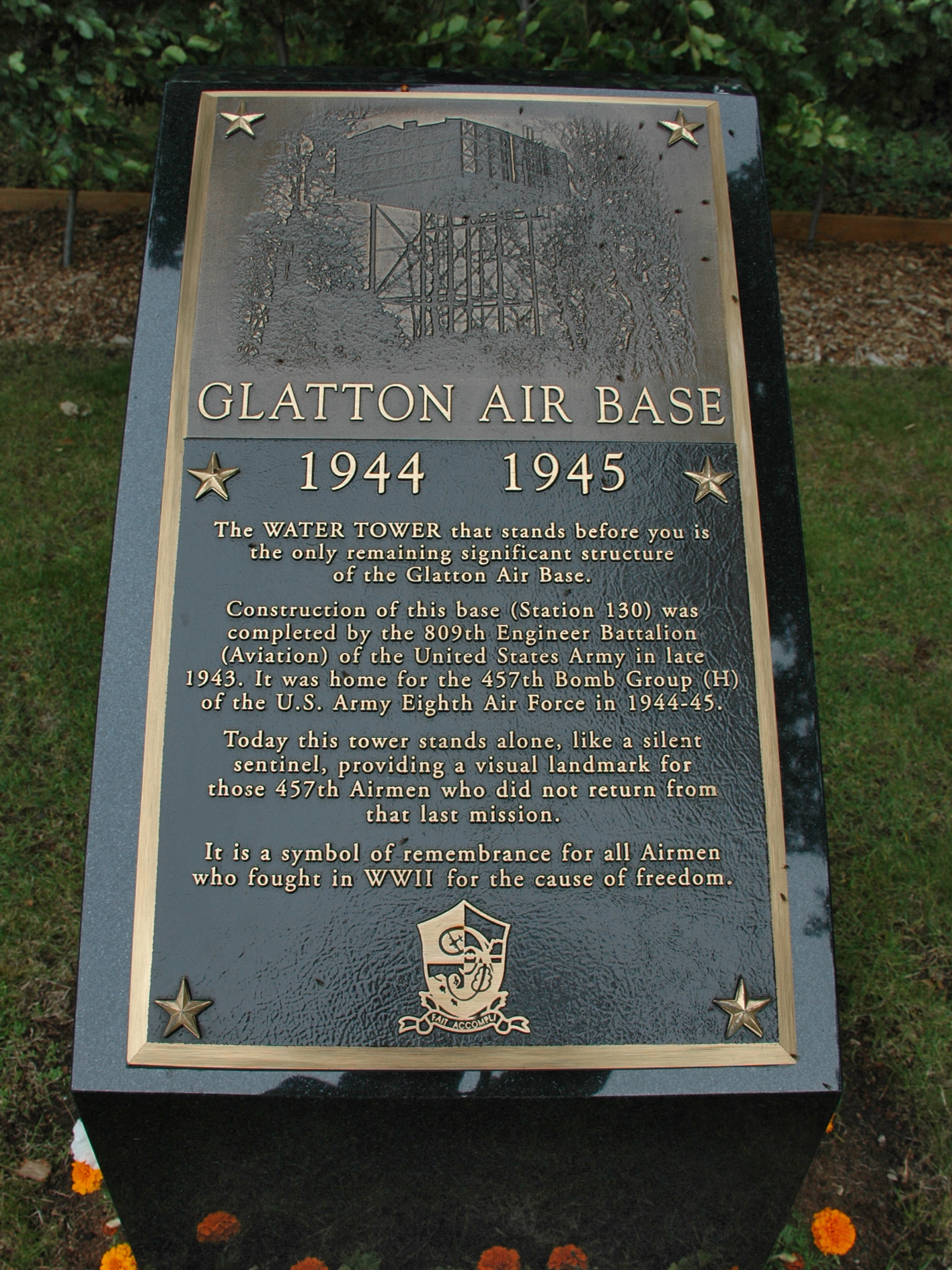
Glatton Airfield Water Tower Memorial to USAAF 457th Bomb Group

With the end of military control, Glatton airfield was largely returned to agriculture. However, parts of two runways have been retained and Glatton now operates as Peterborough Business Airport. The churchyard of All Saints Church in Conington contains a memorial to the men of the 457th Bomb Group who lost their lives on missions that flew from Glatton.

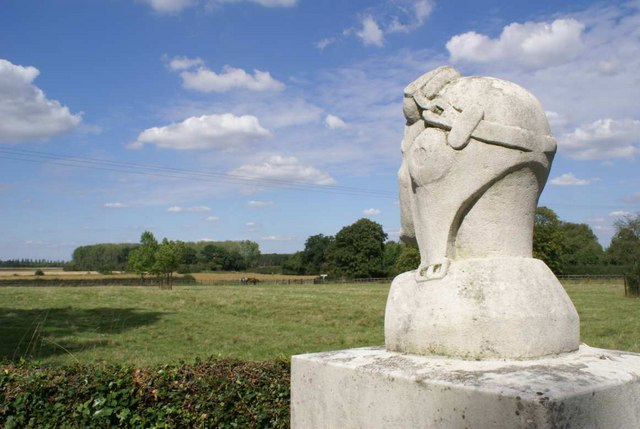
457th Bomb Group (USAAF) memorial at All Saints Church, Conington

== See also ==
- List of former Royal Air Force stations
