= 839th Bombardment Squadron =

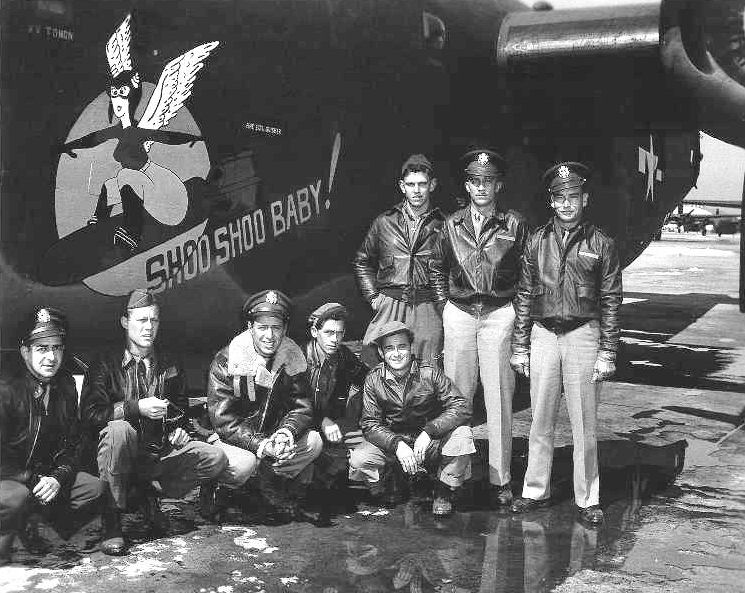
- 839th Bombardment Squadron flight crew of "Shoo Shoo Baby" (Note: Aircraft is Ford Motors built Consolidated B-24H-15-FO Liberator, serial 42-52747.)
- Active: 1940–1945
- Country: United States
- Branch: United States Air Force
- Role: Bombardment
- Engagements: Antisubmarine Campaign; European Theater of Operations

Insignia
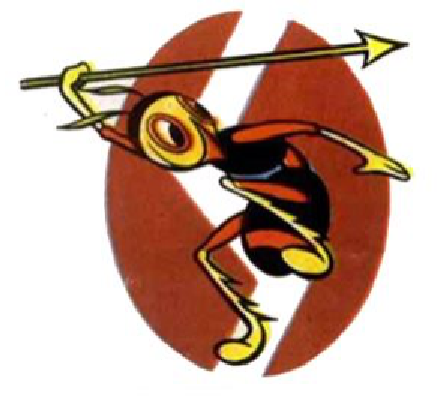
- 839th Bombardment Squadron emblem
- Squadron code: R5

The 839th Bombardment Squadron is an inactive United States Army Air Forces unit. It was activated in January 1941 as the 79th Bombardment Squadron and equipped with Douglas A-20 Havoc light bombers. Following the attack on Pearl Harbor the squadron began to fly antisubmarine patrols off the Atlantic coast and over the Caribbean Sea, becoming the 8th Antisubmarine Squadron.

After the Navy assumed the unit's mission, it moved to New Mexico, where it formed the cadre for and trained as a Consolidated B-24 Liberator unit, and deployed with its planes to the European Theater of Operations. It was briefly withdrawn from combat when the squadron converted to Boeing B-17 Flying Fortresses, and then continued combat with the 487th Bombardment Group. Following V-E Day it returned to Drew Field, Florida, where it was inactivated on 7 November 1945.

== History ==
=== Antisubmarine warfare ===
The squadron was organized at Army Air Base, Savannah, Georgia in January 1941 as the 79th Bombardment Squadron, one of the original squadrons of the 45th Bombardment Group and equipped with Douglas A-20 Havocs (along with a few DB-7s, an export version of the A-20). (Note: The United States impounded 356 DB-7s ordered for France or Great Britain Baugher, Joseph (27 October 2001). "Douglas DB-73". Joe Baugher.) In June the 80th moved with the group to Army Air Base, Manchester, New Hampshire. It also received Douglas B-18 Bolos, which were later equipped with radar for the antisubmarine mission.

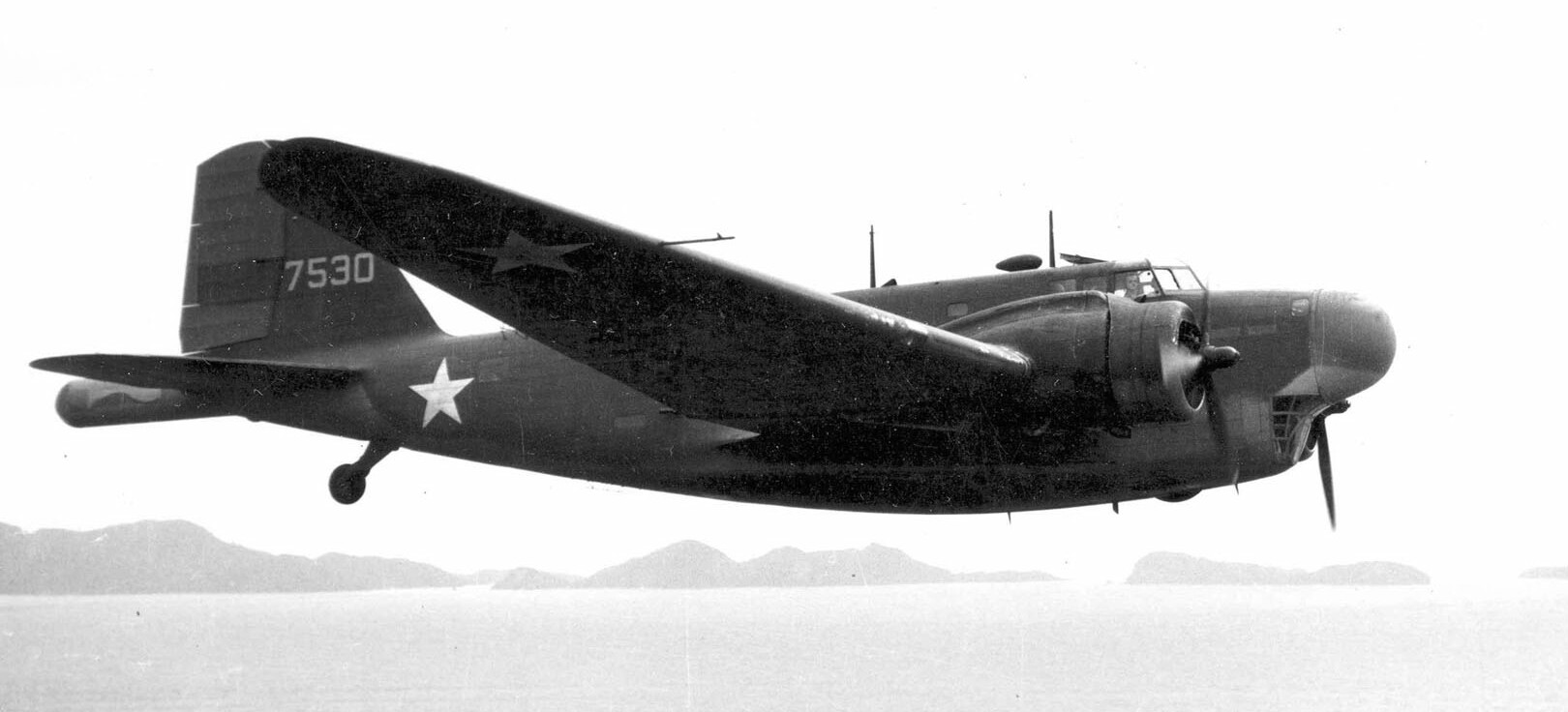
Douglas B-18B equipped for antisubmarine warfare

Following the attack on Pearl Harbor the squadron began flying antisubmarine patrols off the Atlantic coast. The squadron moved to Marine Corps Air Station Cherry Point, North Carolina in May 1942 and to Miami Army Air Field, Florida in September.

In October 1942, the Army Air Forces organized its antisubmarine forces into the single Army Air Forces Antisubmarine Command, which established the 26th Antisubmarine Wing the following month to control its forces operating over the Gulf of Mexico and the Caribbean Sea. The command's bombardment group headquarters, including the 45th, were inactivated and the squadron, now designated the 8th Antisubmarine Squadron, was assigned directly to the 26th Wing. in June 1943, and commenced operations from Batista Field, Cuba, patrolling the Yucatán Channel. In the antisubmarine role, the squadron began to operate a variety of medium and heavy bombers.

By the fall of 1942, the U-boat threat along the Atlantic coast had substantially diminished, but German wolfpacks were attacking merchant shipping in the waters near Trinidad. In July 1943, the squadron moved to Edinburgh Field, where it joined elements of the 25th Bombardment Group, a Sixth Air Force unit, that was also engaged in antisubmarine patrols. They remained there until August 1943, when the 9th returned to its base in Miami. However, Edinburgh Field's runway was found to be insufficient to sustain the squadron's Consolidated B-24 Liberator operations. Consequently, while squadron headquarters remained there, its B-24Ds were deployed to Zandery Field, Surinam and airfields in the Natal, Brazil area and even as far as Wideawake Airfield on Ascension Island in the South Atlantic.

During the squadron's first month's operations, four unit B-24Ds made attacks on submarines, several of them "scoring" against the U-boats and, in turn, several of them reporting damage by return anti-aircraft fire, although all regained their base and there were only slight casualties. The bulk of the unit returned to Miami Airport on 30 August 1943. However, a detachment was maintained at Waller Field, Trinidad, as late as 11 September 1943.

In July 1943, the AAF and Navy reached an agreement to transfer the coastal antisubmarine mission to the Navy. This mission transfer also included an exchange of AAF long-range bombers equipped for antisubmarine warfare for Navy Consolidated B-24 Liberators without such equipment.

=== Heavy Bombardment Squadron ===
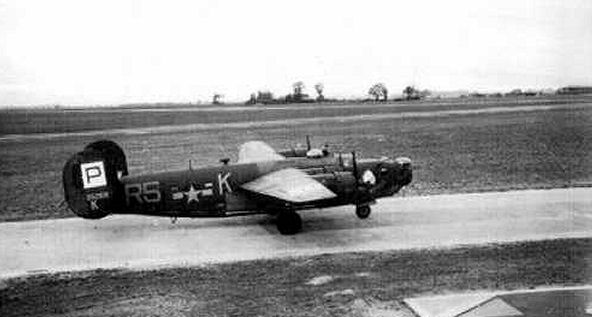
A B-24 of the 839th Bombardment Squadron

The squadron moved to Pueblo Army Air Base, Colorado in September 1943, where it formed the cadre for the 487th Bombardment Group, a newly formed Consolidated B-24 Liberator group that was organizing at Bruning Army Air Field, Nebraska. The following month, the squadron was redesignated the 839th Bombardment Squadron and was assigned to the 487th Group. The squadron trained with Liberators until March 1944, when it departed for the European Theater of Operations. The ground echelon left Alamogordo Army Air Field, New Mexico on 10 March 1944 for the port of embarkation at Camp Kilmer, New Jersey, sailing on the SS Duchess of Bedford and arrived in Great Britain on 3 April. The air echelon departed via the southern ferry route on 23 March.

The squadron arrived at RAF Lavenham, its base in England, on 4 April 1944, with the air echelon arriving between 13 and 17 April. The 839th entered combat on 7 May 1944, bombing airfields in Normandy in preparation for Operation Overlord. During the landings, the squadron struck coastal defenses, road junctions, bridges and rolling stock. It supported British troops near Caen by attacking German troops and artillery redoubts and made similar attacks to support troops assaulting Brest. It provided support for Operation Market Garden, the attempt to seize bridgeheads across the Rhine River near Arnhem and Nijmegen in the Netherlands.

Because of its involvement with tactical operations, the squadron engaged in only limited strategic operations through August 1944. On 19 July 1944, the squadron was taken off combat operations, along with other units of the 92d Combat Bombardment Wing, to convert from the Liberator to the Boeing B-17 Flying Fortress, in a move that would transform the 3d Bombardment Division to an all Flying Fortress organization. After completing the transition to the B-17 on 1 August 1944, the unit began to focus on strategic targets until March 1945. It attacked oil refineries in Merseburg, Mannheim and Dulmen; factories in Nuremberg, Hanover and Berlin; and marshalling yards in Köln, Münster, Hamm and Neumunster.

The squadron was diverted from the strategic bombing campaign to support ground troops during the Battle of the Bulge from December 1944 to January 1945. It also flew interdiction missions during the Allied crossings of the Rhine and final thrust across Germany. It flew its last combat mission on 21 April 1945.

The squadron remained in England after V-E Day. The air echelon began to fly their B-17s back to the United States in the last week of July, while the rest of the unit returned to the United States on the RMS Queen Elizabeth. It reassembled at Drew Field, Florida in September and was inactivated there on 7 November 1945.

== Lineage ==
- Constituted as the 79th Bombardment Squadron (Light) on 20 November 1940

Activated on 15 January 1941
Redesignated 79th Bombardment Squadron (Medium) on 30 December 1941
Redesignated 8th Antisubmarine Squadron (Heavy) on 29 November 1942
Redesignated 839th Bombardment Squadron, Heavy on 14 October 1943
Inactivated on 7 November 1945

=== Assignments ===
- 45th Bombardment Group, 15 January 1941
- 26th Antisubmarine Wing, 22 November 1942 (attached to 25th Bombardment Group July–August 1943)
- 487th Bombardment Group, 14 October 1943 – 7 November 1945

=== Stations ===
- Army Air Base, Savannah, Georgia, 15 January 1941
- Army Air Base, Manchester (later Grenier Field), New Hampshire, 19 June 1941
- Marine Corps Air Station Cherry Point, North Carolina, 12 May 1942
- Miami Army Air Field, Florida, 11 September 1942 (operated from Edinburgh Field, Trinidad and other bases in the area, July–August 1943)
- Pueblo Army Air Base, Colorado, 14 October 1943
- Bruning Army Air Field, Nebraska, 17 November 1943
- Alamogordo Army Air Field, New Mexico, 15 December 1943 – 10 March 1944
- RAF Lavenham (AAF-137), England, 4 April 1944 – 26 August 1945
- Drew Field, Florida, 3 September-7 November 1945

=== Aircraft ===
- Douglas A-20 Havoc, 1941–1942
- Lockheed A-29 Hudson, 1942–1943
- Douglas B-18 Bolo, 1941–1943
- Douglas DB-7, 1941–1943
- Lockheed B-34 Ventura, 1942–1943
- Lockheed RB-37 Ventura, 1942–1943 (Note: Maurer calls these aircraft "RM-37"s. The B-37s were also impounded from shipments to foreign countries. Baugher, Joseph (18 June 2001). "Lockheed B-37". Joe Baugher..)
- Consolidated B-24 Liberator, 1942-1943, 1943–1944
- Boeing B-17 Flying Fortress, 1944–1945

=== Campaigns ===
Campaign Streamer	Campaign	Dates	Notes
	Antisubmarine	7 December 1941 – 1 August 1943	79th Bombardment Squadron (later 8th Antisubmarine Squadron)
	Air Offensive, Europe	4 April 1944 – 5 June 1944	839th Bombardment Squadron
	Air Combat, EAME Theater	4 April 1944 – 11 May 1945	839th Bombardment Squadron
	Normandy	6 June 1944 – 24 July 1944	839th Bombardment Squadron
	Northern France	25 July 1944 – 14 September 1944	839th Bombardment Squadron
	Rhineland	15 September 1944 – 21 March 1945	839th Bombardment Squadron
	Ardennes-Alsace	16 December 1944 – 25 January 1945	839th Bombardment Squadron
	Central Europe	22 March 1944 – 21 May 1945	839th Bombardment Squadron

== See also ==
- List of Douglas A-20 Havoc operators
- B-17 Flying Fortress units of the United States Army Air Forces
- B-24 Liberator units of the United States Army Air Forces
