= 833rd Bombardment Squadron =

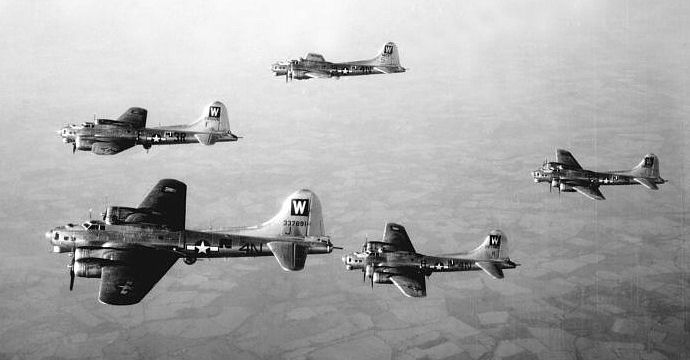
- 486th Bombardment Group B-17 Flying Fortresses (Note: The aircraft closest to the camera is squadron Boeing B-17G-75-BO Flying Fortress, serial 43-37891, Old Man's Folly. It was damaged while parked on 20 May 1945 and salvaged. Baugher, Joe (15 May 2023). "1943 USAF Serial Numbers". Joe Baugher.)
- Active: 1943–1945
- Country: United States
- Branch: United States Air Force
- Role: Heavy bomber
- Engagements: European Theater of Operations

Insignia
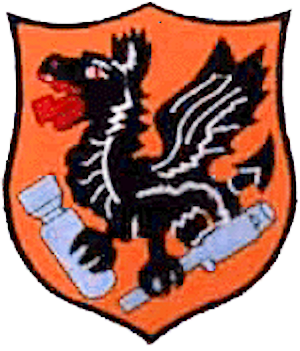
- 833rd Bombardment Squadron emblem
- Squadron fuselage code: 4N

The 833rd Bombardment Squadron is an inactive United States Army Air Forces unit. It trained as a Consolidated B-24 Liberator unit, and deployed with its planes to the European Theater of Operations, entering combat in the strategic bombing campaign against Germany on 7 May 1944. In July 1944, the squadron converted to Boeing B-17 Flying Fortresses, continuing combat with the 486th Bombardment Group until April 1945. Following V-E Day it returned to Drew Field, Florida, where it was inactivated on 7 November 1945.

== History ==
The 833rd Bombardment Squadron was activated at McCook Army Air Field, Nebraska on 20 September 1943 as one of the original squadrons of the 486th Bombardment Group. After organizing as a Consolidated B-24 Liberator unit, it moved to Davis-Monthan Field, Arizona in November and trained for combat. The squadron began deploying overseas in early March 1944. Its air echelon flew its Liberators along the southern ferry route.

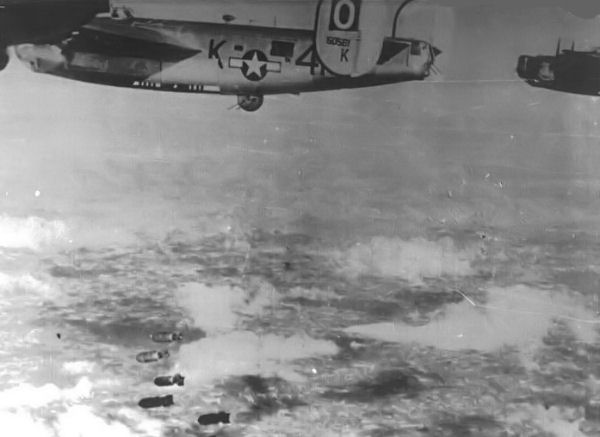
Squadron B-24s (Note: Identifiable is Ford Motors built Consolidated B-24M-5-FO Liberator, serial 44-50581. This aircraft survived the war and was sent to Kingman Army Air Field, Arizona on 3 January 1946 for scrapping. Baugher, Joe (10 June 2023). "1944 USAF Serial Numbers". Joe Baugher.)

The squadron arrived at its combat station, RAF Sudbury the following month. It flew its first combat mission on May 7. It conducted strategic bombing missions against industrial facilities, including oil refineries and petroleum storage facilities at Dollbergen, Hamburg and Merseburg and factories at Mannheim and Weimar. It also struck at transportation targets, such as marshalling yards near Köln, Mainz and Stuttgart; airfields at Kassel and Münster; and harbor installations at Bremen and Kiel. On 19 July 1944, along with the other B-24 units of the 92d Bombardment Wing, the squadron was taken off operations and began conversion to the Boeing B-17 Flying Fortress. This would mark the beginning of the change of the 3d Bombardment Division to an All-B-17 unit. The group completed its conversion and resumed operations by 1 August, while its Liberators were sent to depots in England for eventual transfer as replacements to 2d Bombardment Division groups.

The squadron was occasionally diverted from strategic targets to support ground forces. Preparing for Operation Overlord, the invasion of Normandy, it attacked bridges, V-weapons launch sites, and airfields. On D-Day it bombed gun positions. As Allied forces advanced across northern France in the summer of 1944, it attacked troop concentrations and road junctions. During Operation Market Garden, it struck gun positions near Arnhem to minimize losses among glider and paratroopers attempting to seize bridges across the Rhine River. In December 1944 and January 1945 it supported troops fighting the Battle of the Bulge. In the spring of 1945 it supported Operation Varsity, the airborne assault across the Rhine. The squadron flew its last mission on 21 April 1945.

The squadron remained in England until August 1945, when it returned to the United States. Its aircraft began departing in early July, while its ground echelon sailed on the RMS Queen Elizabeth on 25 August, arriving in New York City six days later. The 833rd reassembled at Drew Field, Florida in September, but was inactivated there on 7 November 1945.

== Lineage ==
- Constituted as the 833rd Bombardment Squadron (Heavy) on 14 September 1943

Activated on 20 September 1943

- Redesignated 833rd Bombardment Squadron, Heavy c. 1944

Inactivated on 7 November 1945

=== Assignments ===
- 486th Bombardment Group, 20 September 1943 – 7 November 1945

=== Stations ===
- McCook Army Air Field, Nebraska, 20 September 1943
- Davis-Monthan Field, Arizona, 9 November 1943 – 9 March 1944
- RAF Sudbury (Station 158), England, 5 April 1944 – August 1945
- Drew Field, Florida, 3 September – 7 November 1945

=== Aircraft ===
- Consolidated B-24H Liberator, 1943–1944
- Boeing B-17G Flying Fortress, 1944–1945

=== Campaigns ===
Campaign Streamer	Campaign	Dates	Notes
	Air Offensive, Europe	5 April 1944 – 5 June 1944	
	Air Combat, EAME Theater	5 April 1944 – 11 May 1945	
	Normandy	6 June 1944 – 24 July 1944	
	Northern France	25 July 1944 – 14 September 1944	
	Rhineland	15 September 1944 – 21 March 1945	
	Ardennes-Alsace	16 December 1944 – 25 January 1945	
	Central Europe	22 March 1944 – 21 May 1945	

== See also ==
- B-17 Flying Fortress units of the United States Army Air Forces
- B-24 Liberator units of the United States Army Air Forces
