= 835th Bombardment Squadron =

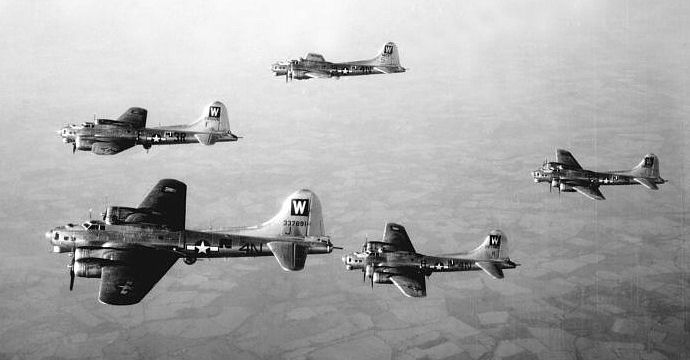
- 486th Bombardment Group B-17 Flying Fortresses
- Active: 1940–1945
- Country: United States
- Branch: United States Air Force
- Role: Antisubmarine, Bombardment
- Engagements: Antisubmarine; European Theater of Operations

Insignia
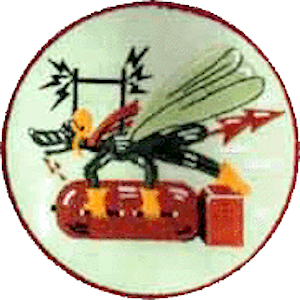
- 835th Bombardment Squadron emblem
- Squadron code: H8

The 835th Bombardment Squadron is an inactive United States Army Air Forces unit. It was activated in January 1941 as the 80th Bombardment Squadron and equipped with Douglas A-20 Havoc light bombers. Following the attack on Pearl Harbor the squadron began to fly antisubmarine patrols off the Atlantic coast and over the Caribbean Sea, becoming the 9th Antisubmarine Squadron.

After the Navy assumed the unit's mission in 1943, it moved to Arizona, where it trained as a Consolidated B-24 Liberator unit, and deployed with its planes to the European Theater of Operations, entering combat in the strategic bombing campaign against Germany on 7 May 1944. In July 1944, the squadron converted to Boeing B-17 Flying Fortresses, continuing combat with the 486th Bombardment Group until April 1945. Following V-E Day it returned to Drew Field, Florida, where it was inactivated on 7 November 1945.

== History ==
=== Antisubmarine Warfare ===
The squadron was organized at Army Air Base, Savannah, Georgia in January 1941 as the 80th Bombardment Squadron, one of the original squadrons of the 45th Bombardment Group and equipped with Douglas A-20 Havocs (along with a few DB-7s, an export version of the A-20). (Note: The United States impounded 356 DB-7s ordered for France or Great Britain Baugher, Joseph (27 October 2001). "Douglas DB-73". Joe Baugher.) In June the 80th moved with the group to Army Air Base, Manchester, New Hampshire.

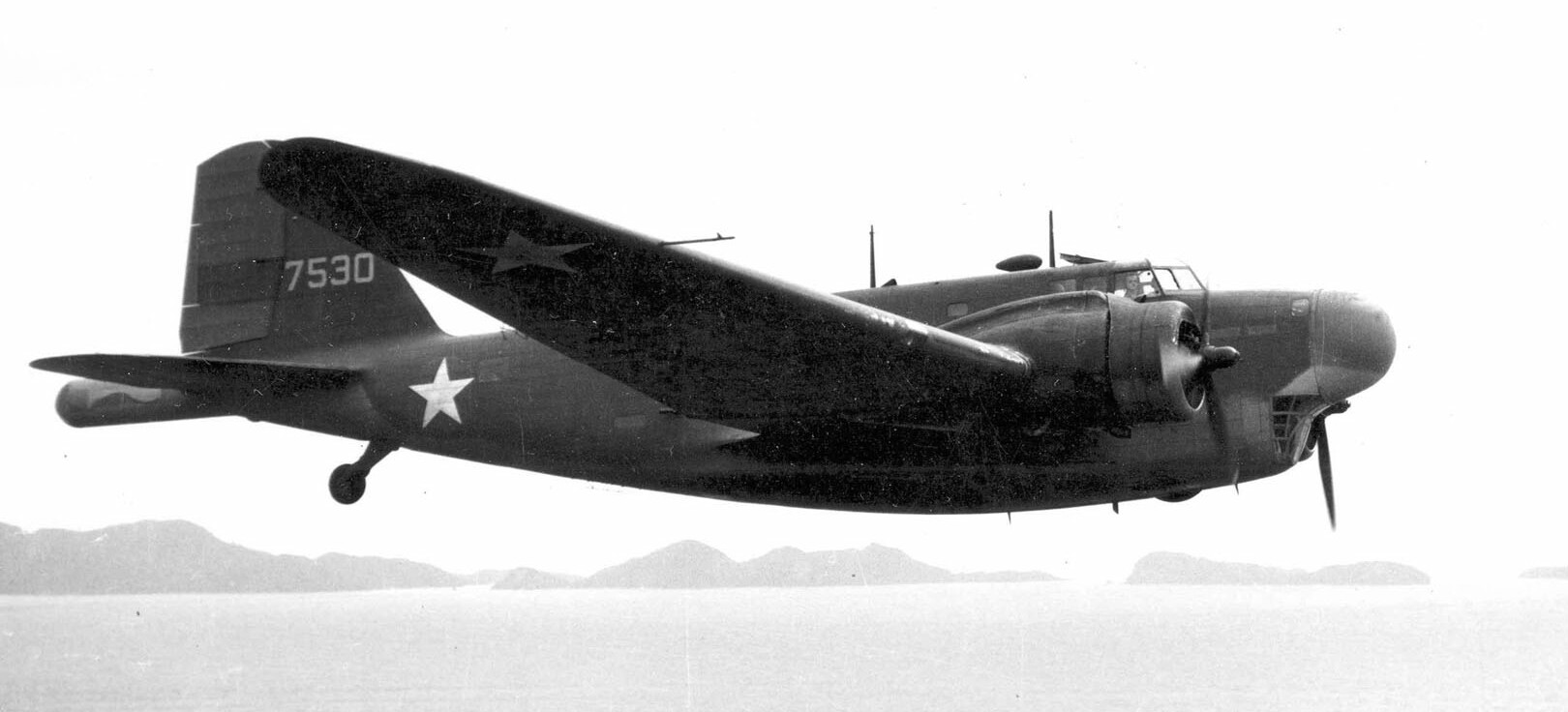
Douglas B-18B equipped for antisubmarine warfare

Following the attack on Pearl Harbor the squadron began flying antisubmarine patrols off the Atlantic coast. In 1942, it converted to the Douglas B-18 Bolo, which was equipped with radar for the antisubmarine mission. The squadron moved to Dover Army Air Field, Delaware in April 1942 and to Miami Army Air Field, Florida in July.

In October 1942, the Army Air Forces organized its antisubmarine forces into the single Army Air Forces Antisubmarine Command, which established the 26th Antisubmarine Wing the following month to control its forces operating over the Gulf of Mexico and the Caribbean Sea. The command's bombardment group headquarters, including the 45th, were inactivated and the squadron, now designated the 9th Antisubmarine Squadron, was assigned directly to the 26th Wing.

By the fall of 1942, the U-boat threat along the Atlantic coast had substantially diminished, but German wolfpacks were attacking merchant shipping in the waters near Trinidad. In November, the squadron moved seven radar-equipped B-18B and three B-18C Bolos, to Edinburgh Field, where it joined elements of the 25th Bombardment Group, a Sixth Air Force unit, that was also engaged in antisubmarine patrols. They remained there until March 1943, when the 9th returned to its base in Miami.

In July 1943, the AAF and Navy reached an agreement to transfer the coastal antisubmarine mission to the Navy. This mission transfer also included an exchange of AAF long-range bombers equipped for antisubmarine warfare for Navy Consolidated B-24 Liberators without such equipment.

=== Combat in the European theater ===
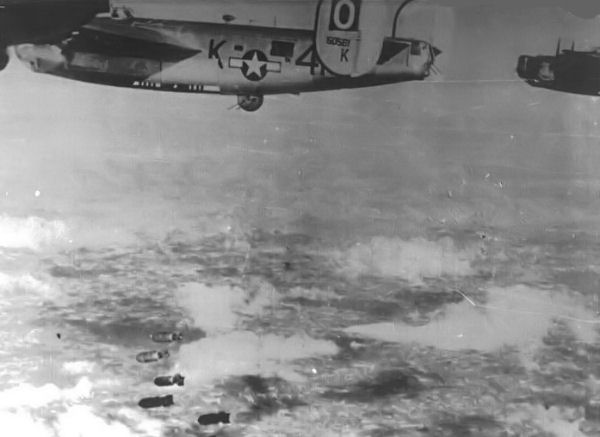
486th Bombardment Group B-24s (Note: Identifiable is Ford Motors built Consolidated B-24M-5-FO Liberator, serial 44-50581. This aircraft survived the war and was sent to Kingman Army Air Field, Arizona on 3 January 1946 for scrapping. Baugher, Joe (10 June 2023). "1944 USAF Serial Numbers". Joe Baugher.)

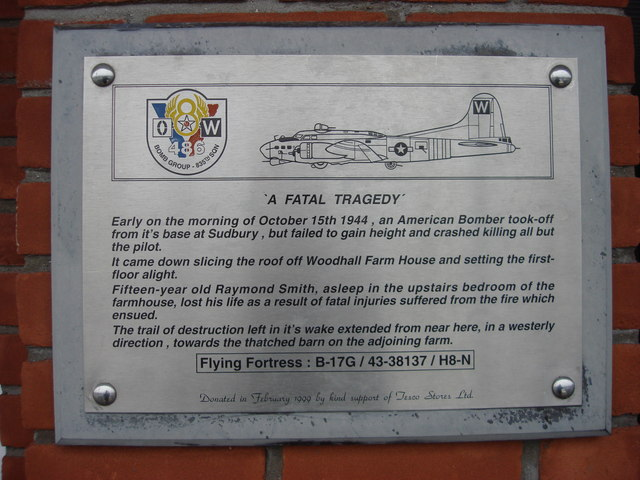
Plaque commemorating the 15 October 1944 crash near RAF Sudbury

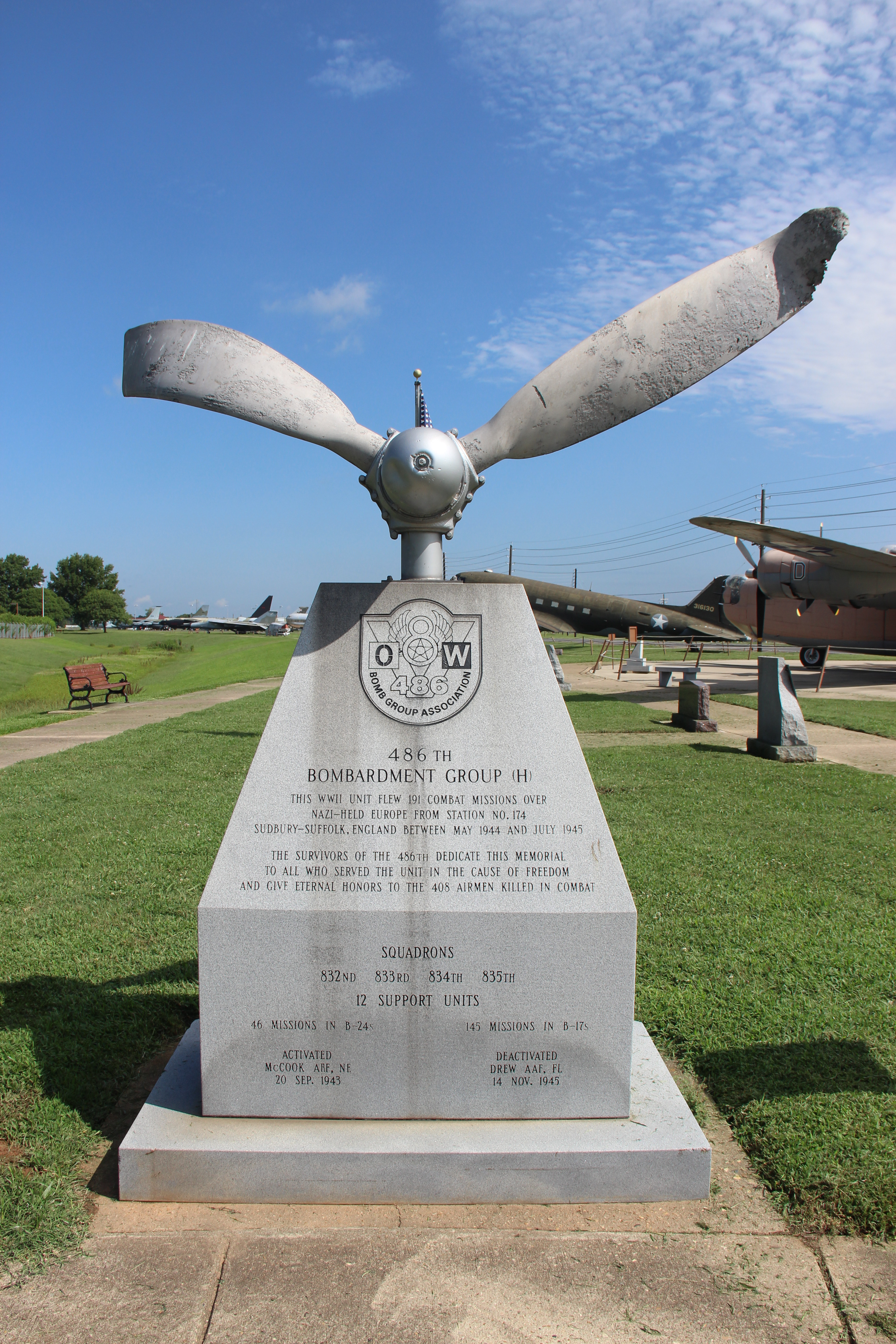
Memorial at Barksdale Global Power Museum including a propeller from the 15 October 1944 crash (above)

After the Navy assumed its mission, the squadron was redesignated the 835th Bombardment Squadron and moved to Davis-Monthan Field, Arizona, where it formed the cadre for the 486th Bombardment Group, which had been activated at McCook Army Air Field, Nebraska on 20 September 1943 as a Consolidated B-24 Liberator unit. The group headquarters joined the squadron at Davis-Monthan in November and trained for combat. The squadron began deploying overseas in early March 1944. Its air echelon flew its Liberators along the southern ferry route.

The squadron arrived at its combat station, RAF Sudbury, the following month. It flew its first combat mission on 7 May. It conducted strategic bombing missions against industrial facilities, including oil refineries and petroleum storage facilities at Dollbergen, Hamburg and Merseburg and factories at Mannheim and Weimar. It also struck at transportation targets, such as marshalling yards near Köln, Mainz and Stuttgart; airfields at Kassel and Münster; and harbor installations at Bremen and Kiel. On 19 July 1944, along with the other B-24 units of the 92d Bombardment Wing, the squadron was taken off operations and began conversion to the Boeing B-17 Flying Fortress. This marked the beginning of the change of the 3d Bombardment Division to an All-B-17 unit. The group completed its conversion and resumed operations by 1 August, while its Liberators were sent to depots in England for eventual transfer as replacements to 2d Bombardment Division groups.

The squadron was occasionally diverted from strategic targets to support ground forces. Preparing for Operation Overlord, the invasion of Normandy, it attacked bridges, V-weapons launch sites, and airfields. On D-Day, it bombed gun positions. As Allied forces advanced across northern France in the summer of 1944, it attacked troop concentrations and road junctions. During Operation Market Garden, it struck gun positions near Arnhem to minimize losses among glider and paratroopers attempting to seize bridges across the Rhine River.

On 15 October 1944, a B-17G of the squadron, 43-38137, crashed on takeoff from RAF Sudbury. The plane's only survivor was the pilot, who was severely injured; a civilian in a house that was struck was also killed. A memorial plaque can be seen in Sudbury, and a propeller from the plane is part of a memorial at Barksdale Global Power Museum in Louisiana.

In December 1944 and January 1945, the squadron supported troops fighting the Battle of the Bulge. In the spring of 1945, it supported Operation Varsity, the airborne assault across the Rhine. The squadron flew its last mission on 21 April 1945.

The squadron remained in England until August 1945, when it returned to the United States. Its aircraft began departing in early July, while its ground echelon sailed on the RMS Queen Elizabeth on 25 August, arriving in New York City six days later. The 835th reassembled at Drew Field, Florida, in September, but was inactivated there on 7 November 1945.

== Lineage ==
- Constituted as the 80th Bombardment Squadron (Light) on 20 November 1940

Activated on 15 January 1941
Redesignated 80th Bombardment Squadron (Medium) on 30 December 1941
Redesignated 9th Antisubmarine Squadron (Heavy) on 29 November 1942
Redesignated 835th Bombardment Squadron (Heavy) on 23 September 1943

- Redesignated 835th Bombardment Squadron, Heavy c. 1944

Inactivated on 7 November 1945

=== Assignments ===
- 45th Bombardment Group, 15 January 1941
- 26th Antisubmarine Wing, 8 December 1942 (attached to 25th Bombardment Group, November 1942— March 1943)
- 486th Bombardment Group, 23 September 1943 – 7 November 1945

=== Stations ===
- Army Air Base, Savannah, Georgia, 15 January 1941
- Army Air Base, Manchester (later Grenier Field), New Hampshire, 18 June 1941
- Dover Army Air Field, Delaware, 29 April 1942
- Miami Army Air Field, Florida, 25 July 1942 (operated from Edinburgh Field, Trinidad, November 1942 – March 1943)
- Davis-Monthan Field, Arizona, 23 September 1943 – 9 March 1944
- RAF Sudbury (Station 158), England, 5 April 1944 – August 1945
- Drew Field, Florida, 3 September-7 November 1945

=== Aircraft ===
- Douglas A-20 Havoc, 1941–1942
- Douglas DB-7, 1941–1942
- Douglas B-18 Bolo, 1942–1943
- North American B-25 Mitchell, 1943
- Consolidated B-24 Liberator, 1943–1944
- Boeing B-17 Flying Fortress, 1944-1945

Campaign Streamer	Campaign	Dates	Notes
	Antisubmarine	7 December 1941 – 1 August 1943	80th Bombardment Squadron (later 9th Antisubmarine Squadron)
	Air Offensive, Europe	5 April 1944 – 5 June 1944	835th Bombardment Squadron
	Air Combat, EAME Theater	5 April 1944 – 11 May 1945	835th Bombardment Squadron
	Normandy	6 June 1944 – 24 July 1944	835th Bombardment Squadron
	Northern France	25 July 1944 – 14 September 1944	835th Bombardment Squadron
	Rhineland	15 September 1944 – 21 March 1945	835th Bombardment Squadron
	Ardennes-Alsace	16 December 1944 – 25 January 1945	835th Bombardment Squadron
	Central Europe	22 March 1944 – 21 May 1945	835th Bombardment Squadron

== See also ==
- B-17 Flying Fortress units of the United States Army Air Forces
- B-24 Liberator units of the United States Army Air Forces
- List of Douglas A-20 Havoc operators
