= 837th Bombardment Squadron =

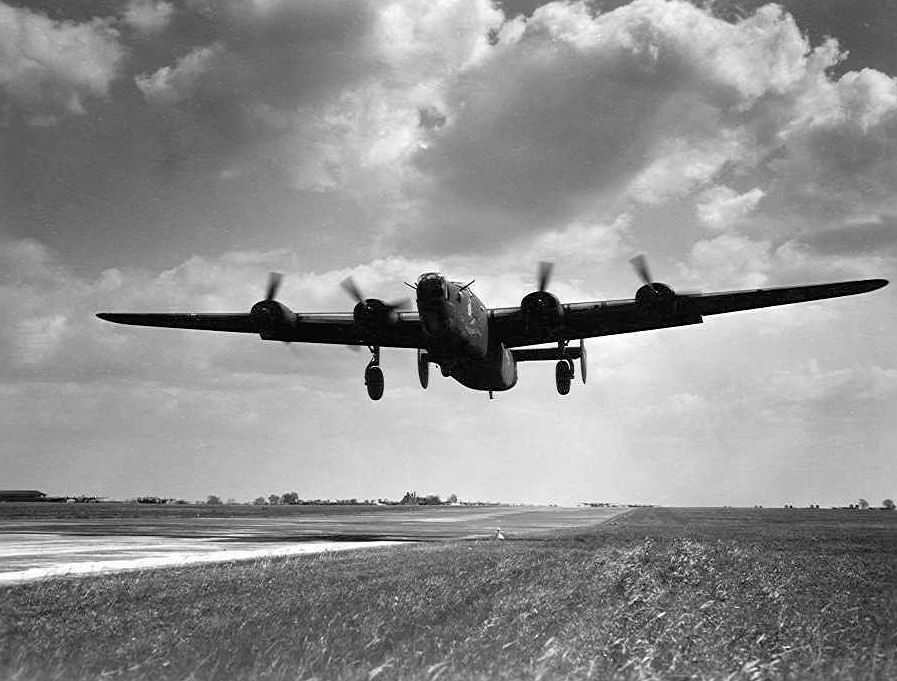
- 837th Bombardment Squadron B-24H taking off from RAF Lavenham (Note: Aircraft is Ford Motors built Consolidated B-24H-15-FO Liberator, serial 42-52425, The Tweachewous Wabbit. This plane was lost on 29 April 1944. Baugher, Joe (14 May 2023). "1942 USAF Serial Numbers". Joe Baugher.)
- Active: 1943–1945
- Country: United States
- Branch: United States Air Force
- Role: Bombardment
- Part of: Eighth Air Force
- Engagements: European Theater of Operations

Insignia
- Squadron fuselage code: 4F

The 837th Bombardment Squadron was a United States Army Air Forces unit. It was activated in September 1943. After training in the United States, it deployed to the European Theater of Operations, where it engaged in combat with Consolidated B-24 Liberators. In the summer of 1944, it was withdrawn from combat to convert to the Boeing B-17 Flying Fortress, then continued in the strategic bombing campaign against Germany with the 487th Bombardment Group until the spring of 1945. Following V-E Day, the squadron returned to Drew Field, Florida, where it was inactivated on 7 November 1945.

== History ==
The 837th Bombardment Squadron was activated at Bruning Army Air Field, Nebraska on 20 September 1943 as one of the original squadrons of the 487th Bombardment Group. The squadron trained with Consolidated B-24 Liberators until March 1944, when it departed for the European Theater of Operations. The ground echelon left Alamogordo Army Air Field, New Mexico on 10 March 1944 for the port of embarkation at Camp Kilmer, New Jersey, sailing on the SS Duchess of Bedford and arrived in Great Britain on 3 April. The air echelon departed via the southern ferry route on 23 March.

The squadron arrived at RAF Lavenham, its base in England, on 4 April 1944, with the air echelon arriving between 13 and 17 April. The 837th entered combat on 7 May 1944, bombing airfields in Normandy in preparation for Operation Overlord. During the landings, the squadron struck coastal defenses, road junctions, bridges, and rolling stock. It supported British troops near Caen by attacking German troops and artillery redoubts and made similar attacks to support troops assaulting Brest. It provided support for Operation Market Garden, the attempt to seize bridgeheads across the Rhine River near Arnhem and Nijmegen in the Netherlands.

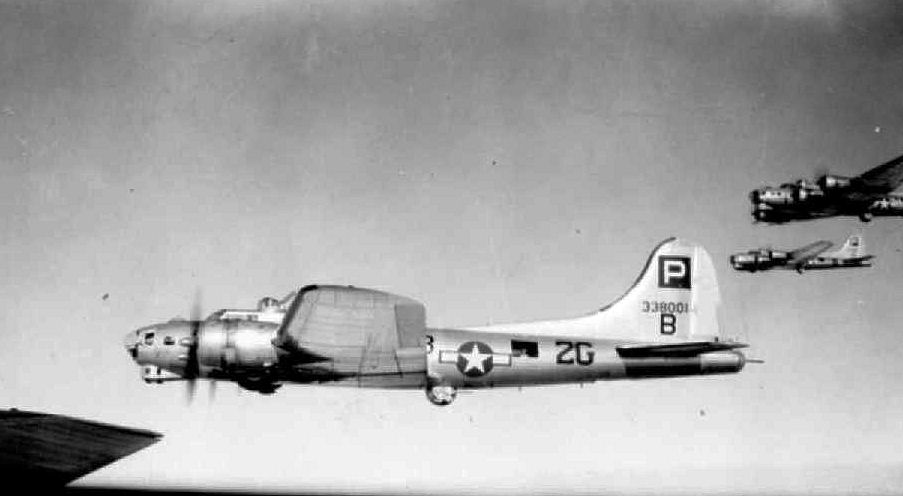
487th Bombardment Group B-17s (Note: Aircraft is Boeing B-17G-75-BO Flying Fortress, serial 43-38001, Oh Miss Agnes. it was shot down by anti-aircraft artillery over Dresden, Germany on 17 April 1945. All nine crewmembers parachuted to safety and were made Prisoners of War. Baugher, Joe (14 May 2023). "1943 USAF Serial Numbers". Joe Baugher.)

Because of its involvement with tactical operations, the squadron engaged in only limited strategic operations through August 1944. On 19 July 1944, the squadron was taken off combat operations, along with other units of the 92d Combat Bombardment Wing, to convert from the Liberator to the Boeing B-17 Flying Fortress, in a move that would transform the 3d Bombardment Division to an all Flying Fortress organization. After completing the transition to the B-17 on 1 August 1944, the unit began to focus on strategic targets until March 1945. It attacked oil refineries in Merseburg, Mannheim and Dulmen; factories in Nuremberg, Hanover and Berlin; and marshalling yards in Köln, Münster, Hamm and Neumunster.

The squadron was diverted from the strategic bombing campaign to support ground troops during the Battle of the Bulge from December 1944 to January 1945. It also flew interdiction missions during the Allied crossings of the Rhine and final thrust across Germany. It flew its last combat mission on 21 April 1945.

The squadron remained in England after V-E Day. The air echelon began to fly their B-17s back to the United States in the last week of July, while the rest of the unit returned to the United States on the RMS Queen Elizabeth in August. It reassembled at Drew Field, Florida in September and was inactivated there on 7 November 1945.

== Lineage ==
- Constituted as the 837th Bombardment Squadron (Heavy) on 14 September 1943

Activated on 20 September 1943
Redesignated 837th Bombardment Squadron, Heavy c. 1944
Inactivated on 7 November 1945

=== Assignments ===
- 487th Bombardment Group, 20 September 1943 – 7 November 1945

=== Stations ===
- Bruning Army Air Field, Nebraska, 20 September 1943
- Alamogordo Army Air Field, New Mexico, 15 December 1943 – 11 March 1944
- RAF Lavenham (AAF-137), England, 4 April 1944 – 26 August 1945
- Drew Field, Florida, 3 September – 7 November 1945

=== Aircraft ===
- Consolidated B-24 Liberator, 1943–1944
- Boeing B-17 Flying Fortress, 1944–1945

=== Campaigns ===
Campaign Streamer	Campaign	Dates	Notes
	Air Offensive, Europe	4 April 1944 – 5 June 1944	
	Air Combat, EAME Theater	4 April 1944 – 11 May 1945	
	Normandy	6 June 1944 – 24 July 1944	
	Northern France	25 July 1944 – 14 September 1944	
	Rhineland	15 September 1944 – 21 March 1945	
	Ardennes-Alsace	16 December 1944 – 25 January 1945	
	Central Europe	22 March 1944 – 21 May 1945	

== See also ==
- B-17 Flying Fortress units of the United States Army Air Forces
- B-24 Liberator units of the United States Army Air Forces
