= List of USAAF squadron codes =

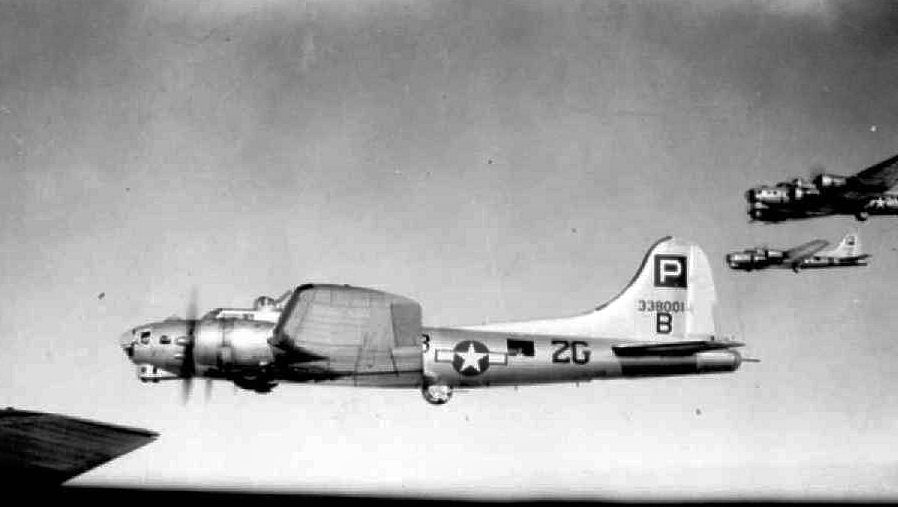
A B-17 with squadron code 2G

This is an incomplete list of squadron codes used by United States Army Air Forces (USAAF) heavy bomber aircraft operating in Europe during World War II.

== Squadron codes ==
For each squadron code—painted on the plane's fuselage—the associated bombardment squadron (BS) is listed, along with the squadron's bombardment group (BG). Most commonly, a group would have four squadrons. Also listed is the group's tail code—the noted letter would appear inside the geometric shape (for example, ▲J means the letter J would appear inside a triangle). Some squadrons and groups also used specific color bands on the wings or empennage of their aircraft; such colorings are not presented here.

Notes:

- 381st BG: some squadrons were assigned more than one code
- 482d BG: Pathfinder squadrons with variable use of codes
- Some squadrons used colors rather than characters; these are listed below

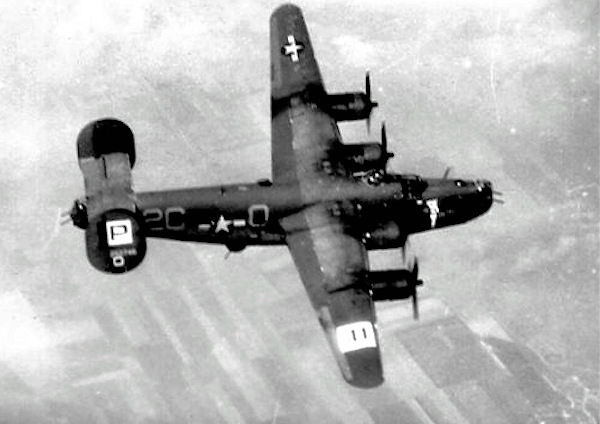
A B-24 with squadron code 2C, denoting the 838th Bombardment Squadron of the 487th Bombardment Group (tail Square P)

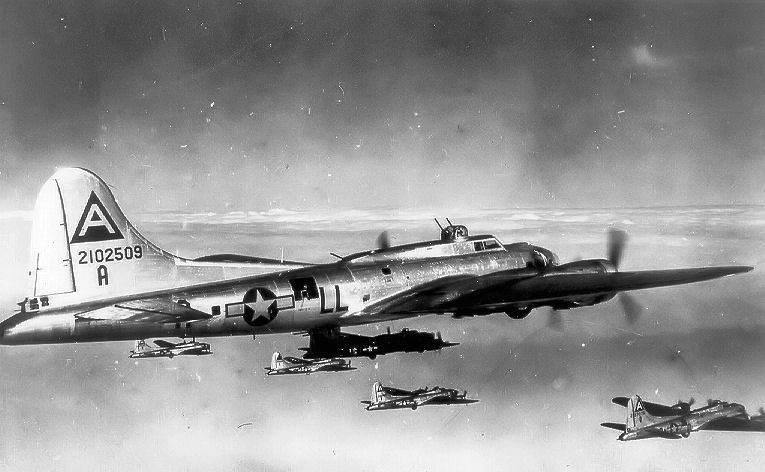
A B-17 with squadron code LL, denoting the 401st Bombardment Squadron of the 91st Bombardment Group (tail Triangle A)

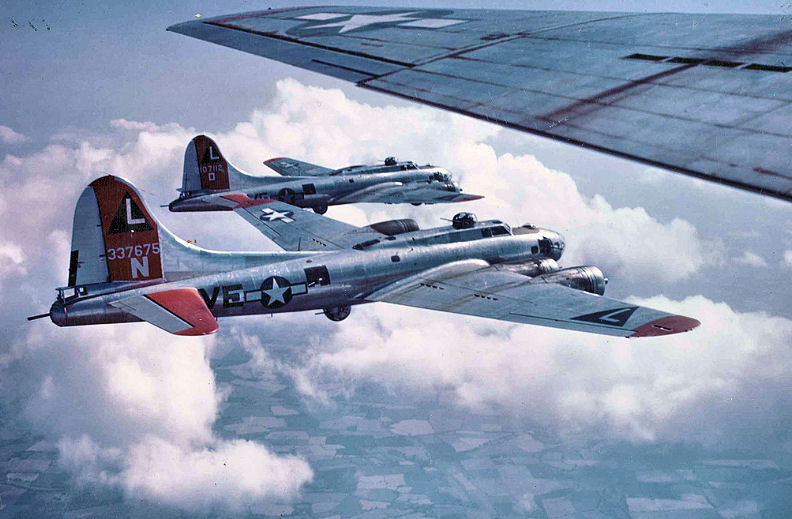
A B-17 with squadron code VE, denoting the 532d Bombardment Squadron of the 381st Bombardment Group (tail Triangle L)

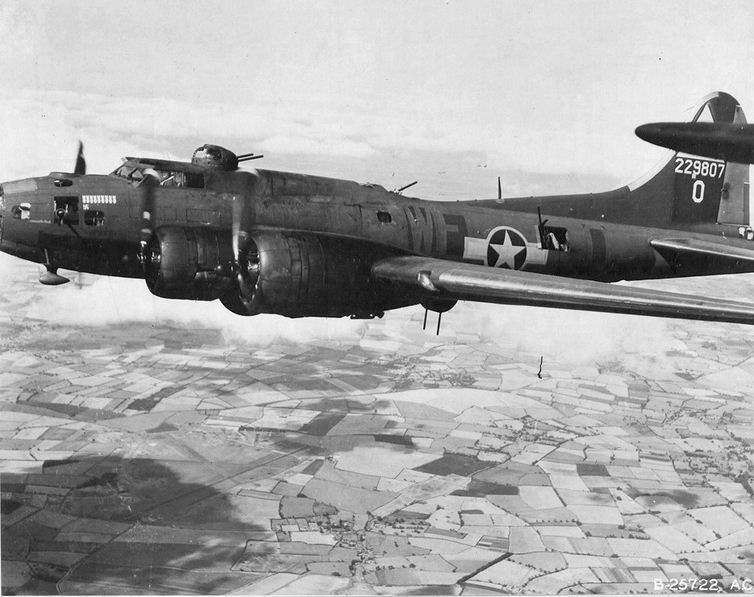
A B-17 with squadron code WF, denoting the 364th Bombardment Squadron of the 305th Bombardment Group (tail Triangle G; obscured in photo)

Code	BS	BG	Tail
2C	838th	487th	■P
2G	836th	487th	■P
2S	834th	486th	■W
3L	4th	34th	■S
3O	601st	398th	▲W
3R	832d	486th	■W
4F	837th	487th	■P
4N	833d	486th	■W
6K	731st	452d	■L
7D	730th	452d	■L
8I	18th	34th	■S
9Z	729th	452d	■L
AW	337th	96th	■C
BG	334th	95th	■B
BI	568th	390th	■J
BK	546th	384th	▲P
BN	359th	303d	▲C
BO	368th	306th	▲H
BX	338th	96th	■C
CC	569th	390th	■J
CQ	708th	447th	■K
DF	324th	91st	▲A
DI	570th	390th	■J
DS	511th	351st	▲J
EP	351st	100th	■D
ET	336th	95th	■B
FC	571st	390th	■J
FO	527th	379th	▲K
FR	525th	379th	▲K
GD	534th	381st	▲L
GL	410th	94th	■A
GN	427th	303d	▲C
GY	367th	306th	▲H
H8	835th	486th	■W
IE	709th	447th	■K
IF	710th	447th	■K
IN	613th	401st	▲S
IP	711th	447th	■K
IW	614th	401st	▲S
IY	615th	401st	▲S
JD	545th	384th	▲P
JJ	422d	305th	▲G
JW	326th	92d	▲B
JZ	534th	381st	▲L
K8	602d	398th	▲W
KY	366th	305th	▲G
LD	418th	100th	■D
LF	526th	379th	▲K
LG	322d	91st	▲A
LL	401st	91st	▲A
LN	350th	100th	■D
M3	728th	452d	■L
MI	812th	482d	▲
MS	535th	381st	▲L
MZ	413th	96th	■C
N7	603d	398th	▲W
N8	600th	398th	▲W
NV	325th	92d	▲B
OE	335th	95th	■B
OQ	533d	381st	▲L
OR	323d	91st	▲A
PC	813th	482d	▲
PL	535th	381st	▲L
PU	360th	303d	▲C
PY	407th	92d	▲B
R2	7th	34th	■S
Q6	391st	34th	■S
QE	331st	94th	■A
QJ	339th	96th	■C
QW	412th	95th	■B
R5	839th	487th	■P
RD	423d	306th	▲H
RQ	509th	351st	▲J
SC	612th	401st	▲S
SI	814th	482d	▲
SO	547th	384th	▲P
SU	544th	384th	▲P
TS	333d	94th	■A
TU	510th	351st	▲J
UX	327th	92d	▲B
VE	532d	381st	▲L
VK	358th	303d	▲C
VP	533d	381st	▲L
WF	364th	305th	▲G
WA	524th	379th	▲K
WW	369th	306th	▲H
XK	365th	305th	▲G
XM	332d	94th	■A
XR	349th	100th	■D
YB	508th	351st	▲J

=== Color codings ===
Notes:

- 457th BG: colors on propeller hubs
- 388th BG: two black bands on tail and wing (all squadrons)

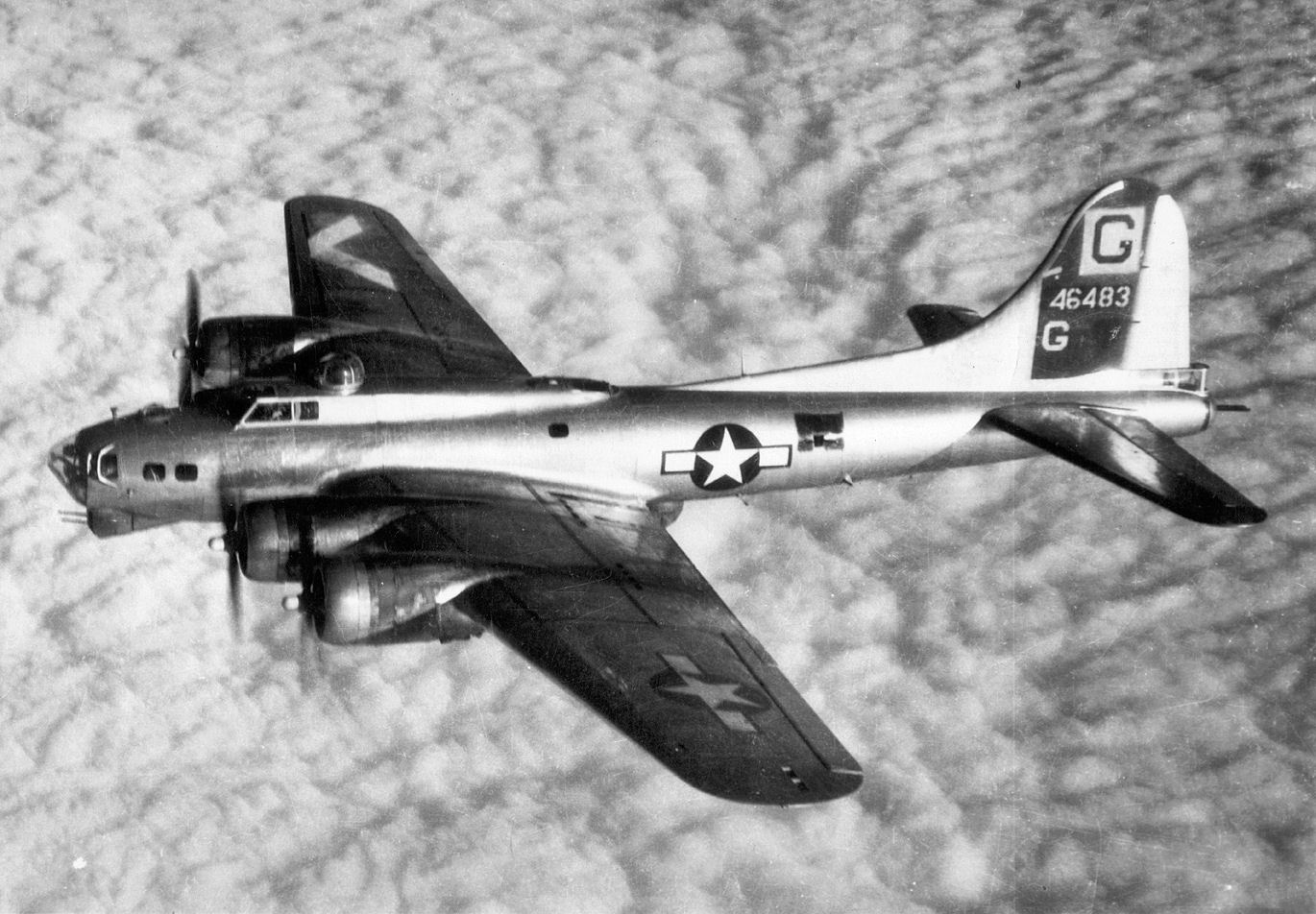
A B-17 of the 385th Bombardment Group (tail Square G)

Color	BS	BG	Tail
Black *	560th	388th	■H
Black *	561st	388th	■H
Black *	562d	388th	■H
Black *	563d	388th	■H
Blue *	548th	385th	■G
Blue *	749th	457th	▲U
Green *	551st	385th	■G
Red *	550th	385th	■G
Red *	748th	457th	▲U
White *	750th	457th	▲U
Yellow *	549th	385th	■G
Yellow *	751st	457th	▲U

== See also ==
- List of RAF squadron codes
- USAAF unit identification aircraft markings
