= RAF Lavenham =

Royal Air Force station in England, 1944–1948

RAF Lavenham RAF Cockfield USAAF Station 137
- Located Near Sudbury, Suffolk, United Kingdom
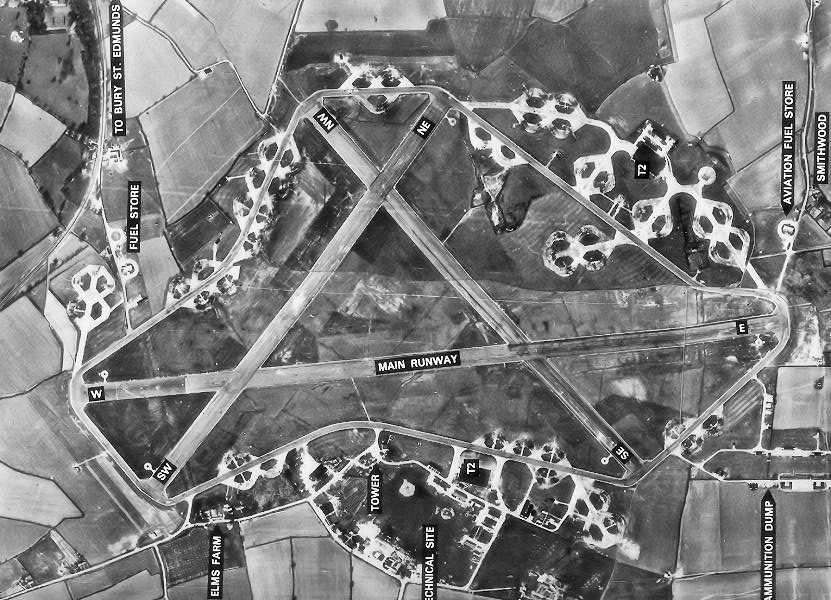
- Lavenham Airfield - 3 April 1946

Site information
- Type: Military airfield
- Code: LV
- Controlled by: United States Army Air Forces

Location
- RAF Lavenham, shown within Suffolk
- Coordinates: 52°08′11.64″N 000°46′9.35″E

Site history
- Built: 1943
- In use: 1944-1948
- Battles/wars: European Theatre of World War II; Air Offensive, Europe July 1942 - May 1945

Garrison information
- Garrison: Eighth Air Force
- Occupants: 487th Bombardment Group

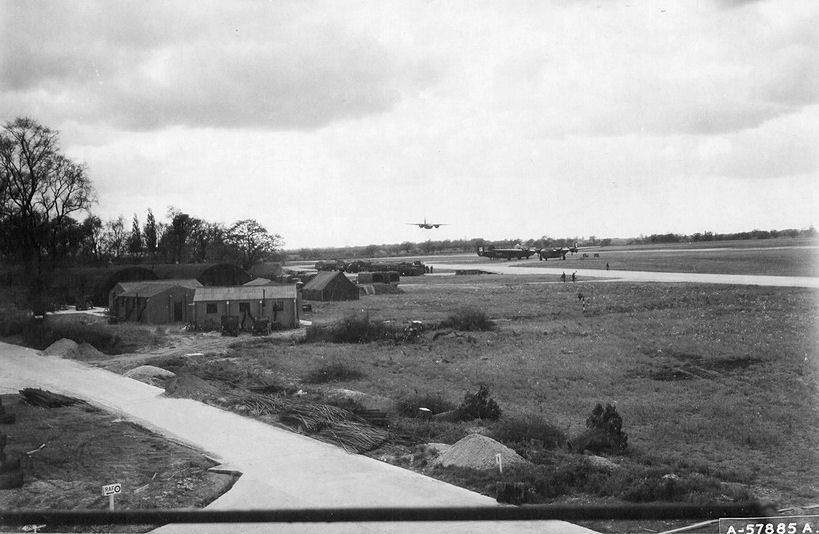
A B-26 about to buzz Lavenham. View is to the west and the buildings at left are 839th BS offices. Two B-24's parked across the airfield are said likely to be 42-94756 and 41–29488.

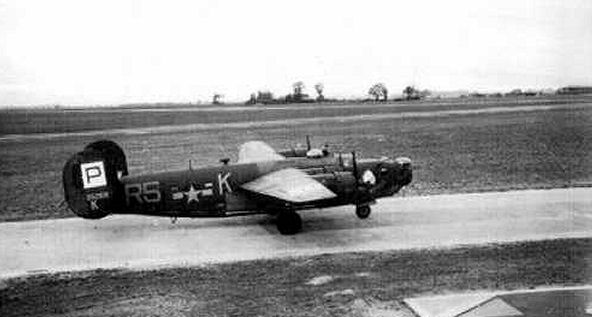
Ford B-24H-15-FO Liberator Serial 42-52618 "Chief Wapello" of the 839th Bomb Squadron. This aircraft was later transferred to 44th Bomb Group and crashed in the Netherlands on 28 January 1945.

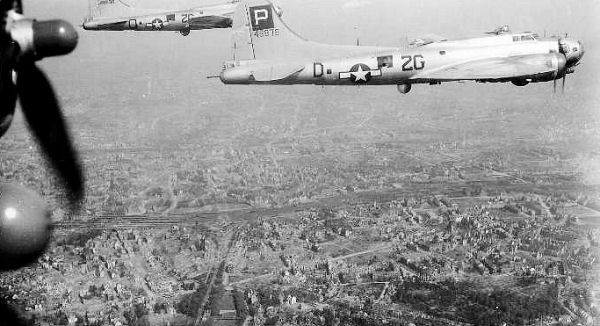
Lockheed/Vega B-17G-85-VE Fortress Serial 44-8878 of the 836th Bomb Squadron over Paris.

RAF Lavenham (also known as Cockfield) is a former World War II airfield in England. The field is located 7 miles (11 km) N of Sudbury in Suffolk, near the village of Alpheton.

== USAAF use ==
Lavenham airfield was built during 1943. The technical site and administrative buildings were on the southern side of the airfield as were most of the dispersed temporary buildings which gave accommodation for 2,900 personnel. Concrete for the runways and 3.5 miles (5.6 km) of perimeter track totalled 190,000 cubic yards (150,000 m^{3}) and that for roads and buildings 52,000 cubic yards (40,000 m^{3}). Bricks used in buildings ran to 4,500,000 and excavations for all sites amounted to 679,000 cubic yards (519,000 m^{3}).

The airfield was opened in April 1944 and was used by the United States Army Air Forces Eighth Air Force. Lavenham was given USAAF designation Station 137 (LV).

=== 487th Bombardment Group (Heavy) ===
The 487th Bombardment Group (Heavy) arrived from Alamogordo AAF New Mexico on 5 April 1944. the 487th was assigned to 8th. Air Force, 3rd. Air Division, 4th Combat Bombardment Wing, and the group tail code was a "Square-P" or "Box-P". Its operational squadrons were:

- 836th Bombardment Squadron (2G)
- 837th Bombardment Squadron (4F)
- 838th Bombardment Squadron (2C)
- 839th Bombardment Squadron (R5)

The group flew both the Consolidated B-24 Liberator and the Boeing B-17 Flying Fortress as part of the Eighth Air Force's strategic bombing campaign and began combat in May 1944, bombing airfields in France in preparation for the invasion of Normandy, then targeted coastal defences, road junctions, bridges and locomotives during the invasion. The unit's first commander was Lieutenant Colonel Beirne Lay, Jr., a prominent Hollywood screenwriter until he was shot down on 11 May 1944 in one of the group's earliest actions. He was shot down over enemy territory but evaded capture and was returned to duty. After the war, he wrote the screenplay for the 1949 film, Twelve O'Clock High.

Aided ground forces in Normandy on D-Day, 6 June 1944. The 487th Bomb Group attacked German troops and artillery positions to assist British forces near Caen in July; struck gun emplacements to support the Allied effort at Brest in August and to cover the airborne attack on the Netherlands in September 1944. Flew a few missions against German industries, refineries, and communications during the period May–August 1944, but operated almost solely against strategic targets from August 1944, when conversion to B-17's was completed in March 1945.

The 487th also attacked oil refineries in Merseburg, Mannheim, and Dülmen; factories in Nuremberg, Hanover, and Berlin; and marshalling yards in Cologne, Münster, Hamm, and Neumünster. Aided ground forces during the Battle of the Bulge, December 1944-January 1945, and turned again to support and interdictory operations in March 1945 as the Allies crossed the Rhine and made the final thrust into Germany. Group nickname was "Gentlemen From Hell".

The group flew 185 combat missions and sortied 6,021 aircraft. Total tonnage dropped − 14,641. 33 aircraft were Missing In Action, and 24 lost in other operations. Enemy aircraft lost were 22 destroyed, 6 probable, 18 damaged.

The group returned to Drew AAF Florida during August–September 1945, and was inactivated on 7 November 1945.

==== Medal of Honor ====
It was from Lavenham that Brigadier General Frederick Castle took off to lead the largest Eighth Air Force mission of the war on Christmas Eve 1944. The object of the attacks, in which 1,400 bombers were escorted by 726 fighters, was to bomb eleven German airfields east of the Rhine while another 634 heavy bombers attacked communication centres west of the Rhine.

Altogether fifty-six American aircraft were lost that day including General Castle's B-17, in an action for which he was posthumously awarded the Medal of Honor, his being the last award of that decoration to a member of the Eighth. His citation reads as follows:

He was air commander and leader of more than 2,000 heavy bombers in a strike against German airfields on 24 December 1944. En route to the target, the failure of one engine forced him to relinquish his place at the head of the formation. In order not to endanger friendly troops on the ground below, he refused to jettison his bombs to gain speed and maneuverability. His lagging, unescorted aircraft became the target of numerous enemy fighters which ripped the left wing with cannon shells, set the oxygen system afire, and wounded two members of the crew. Repeated attacks started fires in two engines, leaving the Flying Fortress in imminent danger of exploding. Realizing the hopelessness of the situation, the bail-out order was given. Without regard for his personal safety he gallantly remained alone at the controls to afford all other crew members an opportunity to escape. Still another attack exploded gasoline tanks in the right wing, and the bomber plunged earthward, carrying General Castle to his death. His intrepidity and willing sacrifice of his life to save members of the crew were in keeping with the highest traditions of the military service.

A portrait of the general hangs to this day in the Swan Hotel at Lavenham, which was one of his wartime haunts and whose then-landlord was a personal friend. He was the highest-ranking officer in the Eighth to be awarded the Medal of Honor.

== Civil use ==
The airfield was closed in 1948 and the land was returned to agricultural use. While many of the roadways remain, the concrete has cracked and nature is gradually encroaching. The runways have been removed to a large extent, although a few sections do still remain. These are mainly used for farming purposes, such as open storage of haystacks and bales. The buildings, by and large, still exist but are in various stages of dilapidation. The exception is the Control Tower, which is maintained.

A short colour film, dating from late 1944 and early 1945 and made by BS Kutchins, can be viewed on the internet. It shows the crew of Lazy Lady, who survived 30 missions as part of the 487th. B17 Ball Turret Gunner Sgt Harold "Sam" Root is seen filmed in nearby Long Melford village, by the Little St Marys bus stop.

The airfield today is still used but only by a small aircraft engineering company carrying out jobs on light aircraft.

== See also ==
- List of former Royal Air Force stations
