= RAF Sudbury =

Former Royal Air Force station in Suffolk, England

RAF Sudbury USAAF Station 174
- Sudbury, Suffolk, England
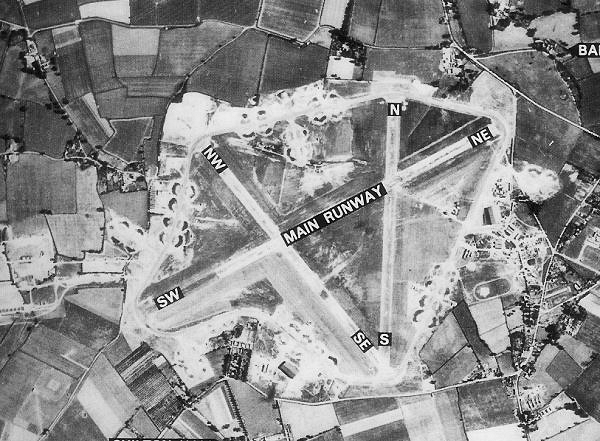
- Sudbury Airfield - 8 July 1945

Site information
- Type: Royal Air Force station
- Code: SU
- Owner: Air Ministry
- Controlled by: United States Army Air Forces

Location
- Location in Suffolk
- Coordinates: 52.062°N 0.756°E

Site history
- Built: 1943
- In use: 1944-1945
- Battles/wars: European Theatre of World War II; Air Offensive, Europe July 1942 - May 1945

Garrison information
- Garrison: Eighth Air Force
- Occupants: 486th Bombardment Group

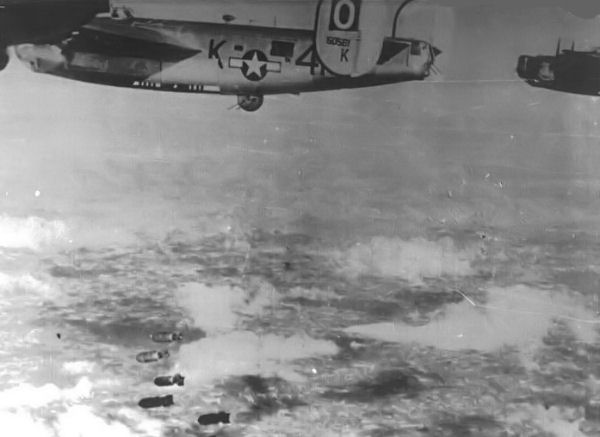
B-24s (Square-O) of the 486th Bomb Group. Identifiable is Ford B-24M-5-FO Liberator Serial 44-50561 of the 833d Bomb Squadron. This aircraft survived the war and was sent to RFC Walnut Ridge Arkansas on 3 January 1946 for scrapping.

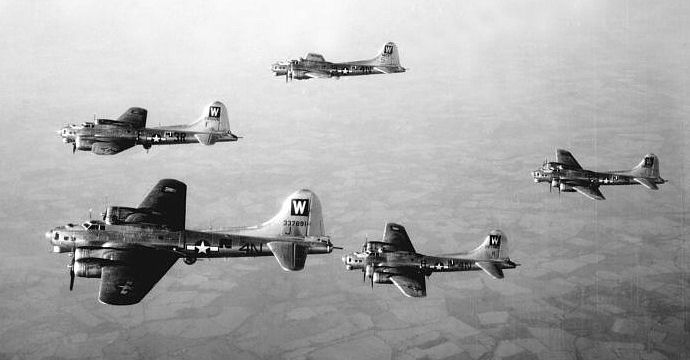
B-17s (Square-W) of the 486th Bomb Group. Identifiable is Douglas-Long Beach B-17G-15-DL Fortress Serial 42-37891 of the 833d Bomb Squadron.

Royal Air Force Sudbury or more simply RAF Sudbury is a former Royal Air Force station located 2 miles (3.2 km) north-east of Sudbury, Suffolk, England.

== History ==
=== USAAF use ===
RAF Sudbury was opened in 1944 and was built as a standard Class A heavy bomber airfield, with three intersecting concrete runways of standard lengths, fifty hardstands and two T2 hangars, to meet the USAAF bomber requirements. The airfield had a slight gradient towards the north-east and was constructed on what had been farmland. Most of the temporary building accommodation for some 3,000 men was situated around the village street of Great Waldingfield to the east of the airfield and was accessible by crossing the B1115 road from Sudbury to Lavenham. The facility was used by the United States Army Air Forces Eighth Air Force. Sudbury was given USAAF designation Station 174 (SU).

==== 486th Bombardment Group (Heavy) ====
The 486th Bombardment Group (Heavy) arrived from Davis-Monthan AAF, Arizona during March 1944. The 486th was assigned to the 4th Combat Bombardment Wing, and the group tail code initially was a "Square-O". When the group converted from B-24s to B-17s during the summer of 1944, the Group ID was changed to "Square-W", perhaps to avoid confusion with the Square-D on B-17s of the 100th Bomb Group. The 486th was the only group to change its ID.

Its operational squadrons were:

- 832d Bombardment Squadron (3R)
- 833d Bombardment Squadron (4N)
- 834th Bombardment Squadron (2S)
- 835th Bombardment Squadron (H8)

The group flew both the Consolidated B-24 Liberator and the Boeing B-17 Flying Fortress as part of the Eighth Air Force's strategic bombing campaign and operated chiefly against strategic objectives in Germany until May 1945. Targets included marshalling yards in Stuttgart, Cologne, and Mainz; airfields in Kassel and Münster; oil refineries and storage plants in Merseburg, Dollbergen, and Hamburg; harbours in Bremen and Kiel; and factories in Mannheim and Weimar.

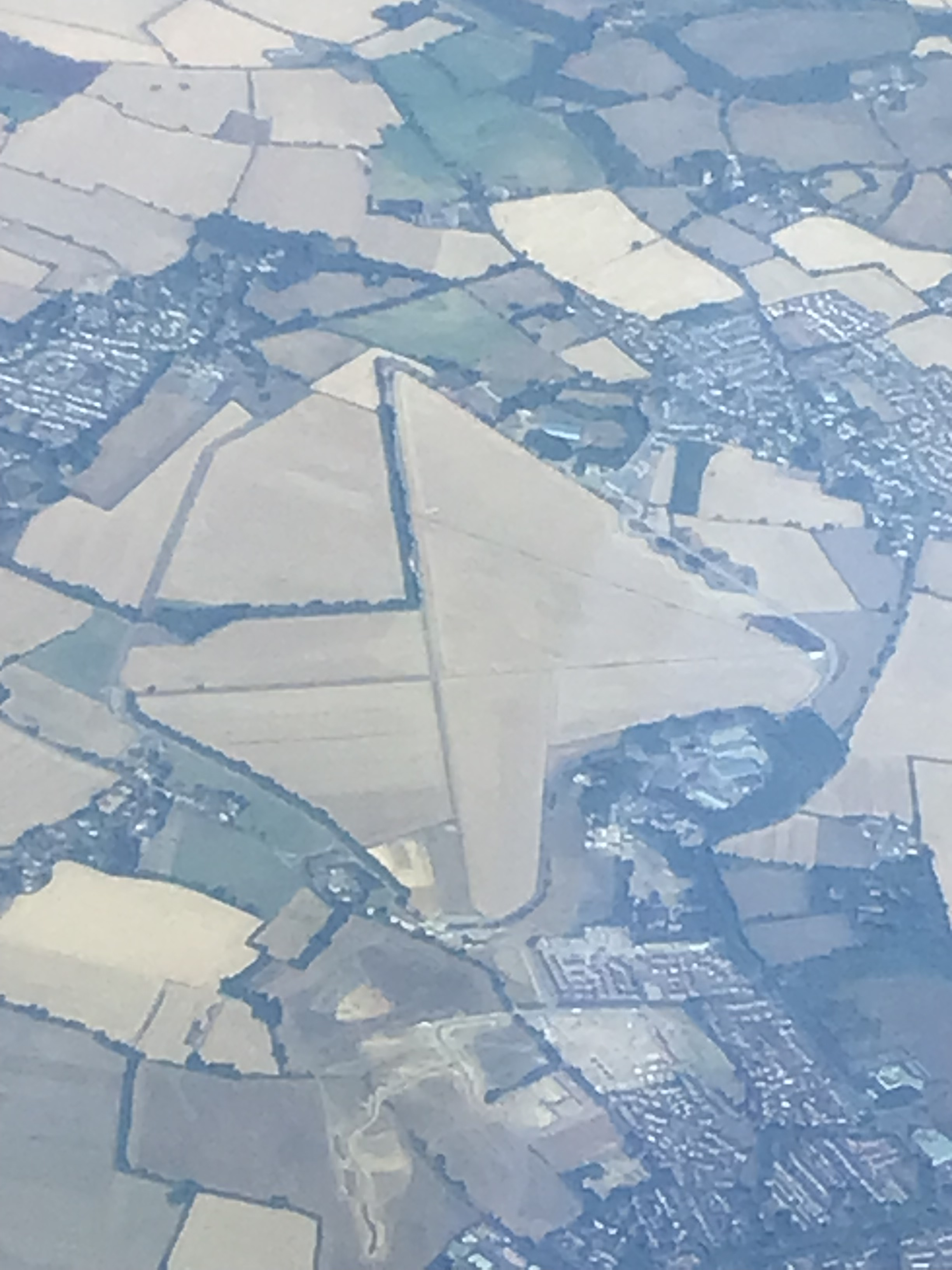
RAF Sudbury (August, 2022)

Other missions included bombing airfields, gun positions, V-weapon sites (total of nine "Operation Crossbow" missions beginning 20 June), and railway bridges in France in preparation for or in support of the invasion of Normandy in June 1944; striking road junctions and troop concentrations in support of ground forces pushing across France, July–August 1944; hitting gun emplacements near Arnhem to minimize transport and glider losses during the airborne invasion of the Netherlands in September 1944; and bombing enemy installations in support of ground troops during the Battle of the Bulge (December 1944-January 1945) and the assault across the Rhine (March–April 1945).

The 468th Bomb Group returned to Drew Field, Florida during August 1945 and was inactivated on 7 November 1945.

After the war the station was closed in 1945 and returned to the RAF, who re-established 16 Recruit Centre (which had been disbanded in 1943), which was in operation from 11 October 1945 to 1946.

== Current use ==
With the end of military control, Sudbury airfield was returned to agriculture and was covered in vegetation or dug up in sections for growing crops. Sections of the runways and hardstands have long been removed (though some still remain) and piles of concrete sit in dumps.

The hangars are now used for grain storage and only the base of the control tower remains.

== See also ==
- List of former Royal Air Force stations
