= 486th Air Expeditionary Wing =

- Active: 1943–1945; 1956–1962; 1987–1988; 2003
- Country: United States
- Branch: United States Air Force
- Engagements: European Theater of Operations; 2003 invasion of Iraq

Insignia
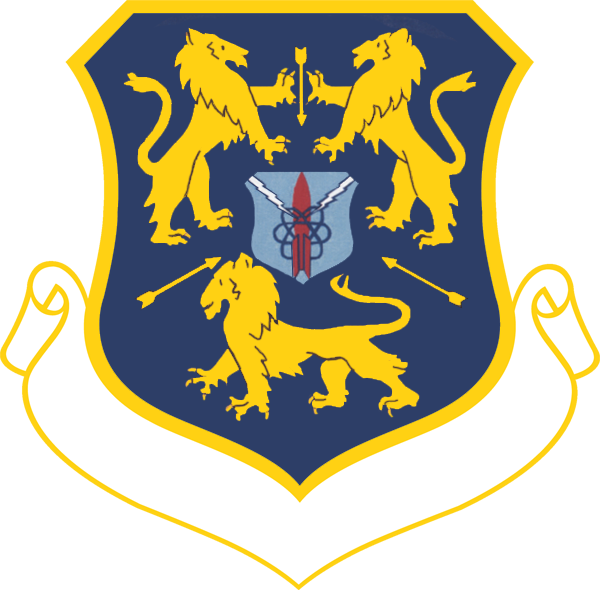
- 486th Air Expeditionary Wing emblem (Note: Approved 26 March 1957.)

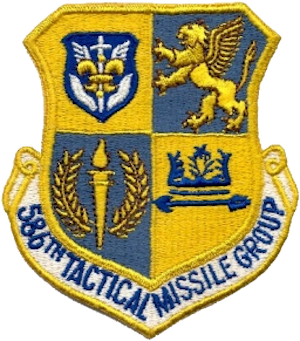
- Patch with 586th Tactical Missile Group emblem (Note: The 586th used the emblem of its parent 38th Tactical Missile Wing with the group designation on the scroll.)

The 486th Air Expeditionary Wing is a provisional United States Air Force unit assigned to the Air Combat Command. As a provisional unit, it may be activated or inactivated at any time.

The unit was last known to be active during Operation Iraqi Freedom in 2003.

During World War II, its predecessor unit, the 486th Bombardment Group (Heavy) was an Eighth Air Force heavy bombardment unit in England, stationed at RAF Sudbury. The group operated chiefly against strategic objectives in Germany until May 1945, flying 188 missions and losing 33 aircraft.

== History ==
=== World War II ===
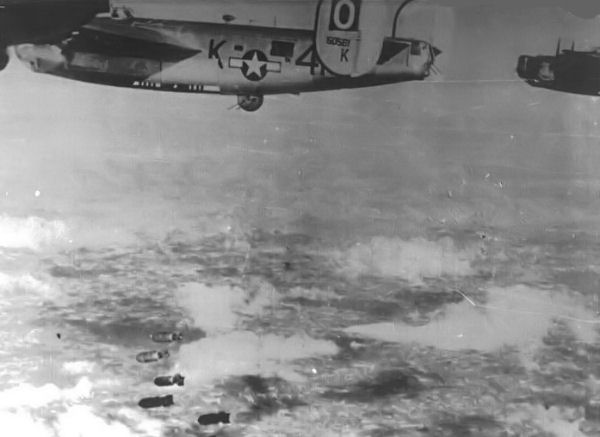
B-24s (Square-O) of the 486th Bomb Group. (Note: Identifiable is Ford Motors built Consolidated B-24M-5-FO Liberator Serial 44-50561 of the 833d Bomb Squadron. This aircraft survived the war and was sent to Reconstruction Finance Corporation at Walnut Ridge Arkansas on 3 January 1946 for scrapping.)

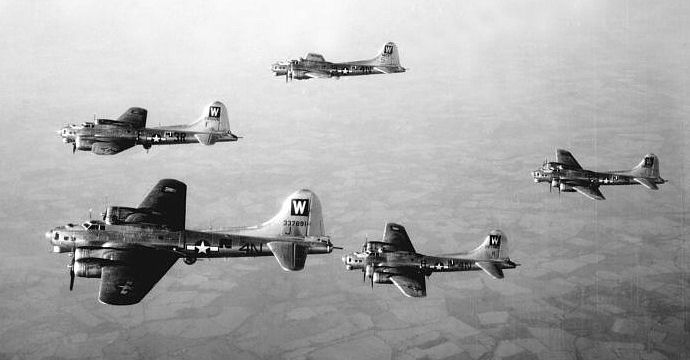
B-17s (Square-W) of the 486th Bomb Group. (Note: Identifiable is Douglas Aircraft Long Beach built Boeing B-17G-15-DL Fortress Serial 42-37891 of the 833d Bomb Squadron.)

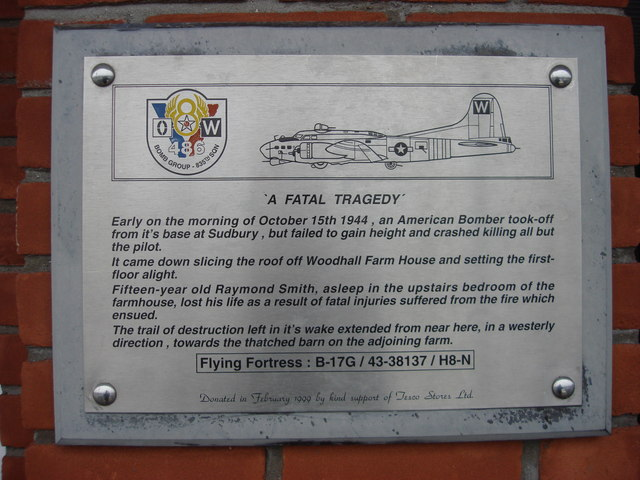
"A Fatal Tragedy" memorial plaque remembering an accident of the 486th Bomb Group that occurred on 15 October 1944 in Sudbury, Suffolk, England

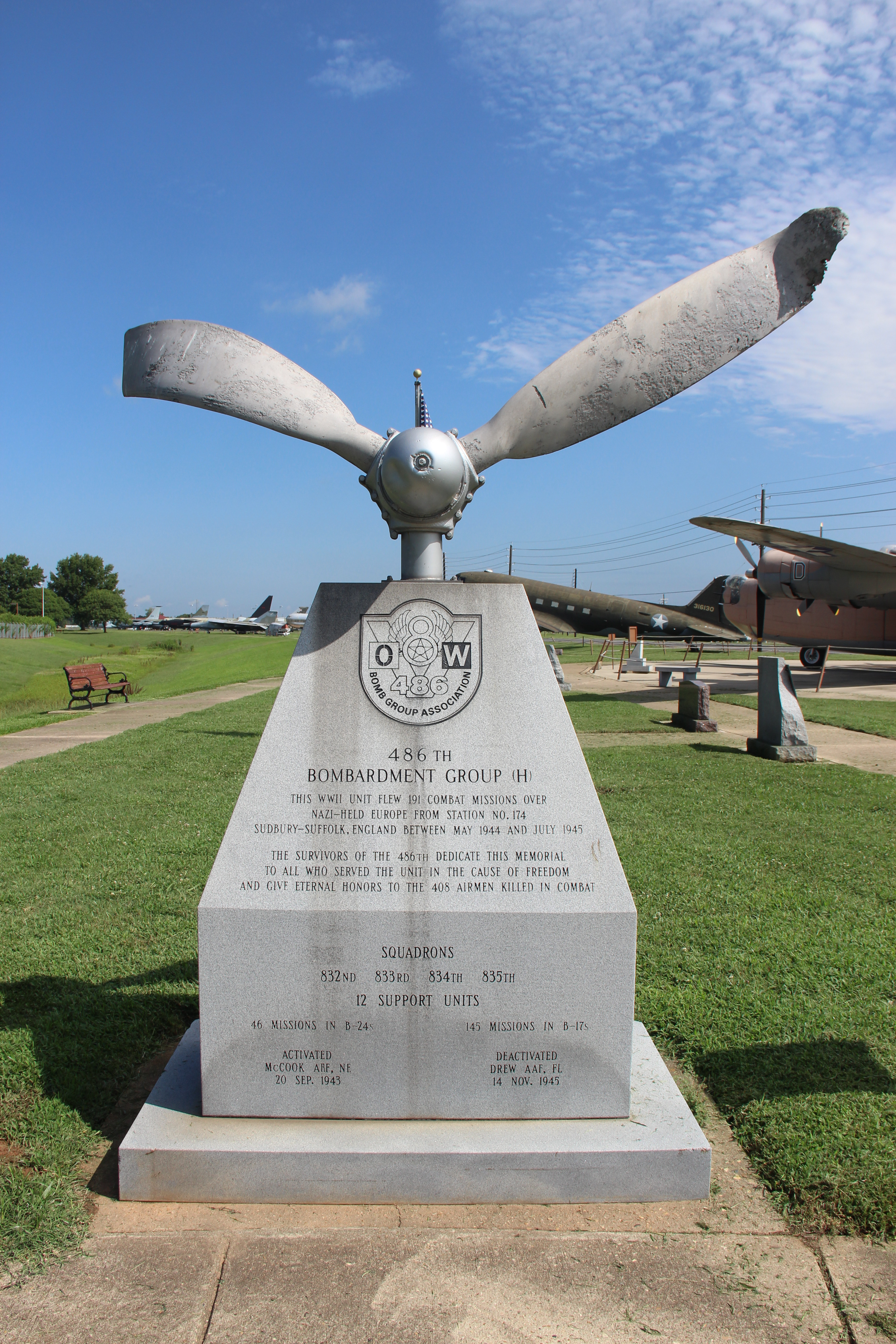
Memorial at Barksdale Global Power Museum with a propeller from the B-17 that crashed in Sudbury (above)

Constituted as 486th Bombardment Group (Heavy) on 14 September 1943 and activated on 20 September Moved to England in March 1944 and assigned to Eighth AF.

The group was assigned to the 4th Combat Bombardment Wing, and the group tail code initially was a "Square-O". When the group converted from B-24s to B-17s during the summer of 1944, the identification symbol was changed to a "Square-W", perhaps to avoid confusion with the Square-D on B-17s of the 100th Bomb Group. The 486th was the only group to change its tail code.

The group flew both the B-24 Liberator and the B-17 Flying Fortress as part of the Eighth Air Force's strategic bombing campaign and operated chiefly against strategic objectives in Germany until May 1945. Targets included marshalling yards in Stuttgart, Cologne, and Mainz; airfields in Kassel and Münster; oil refineries and storage plants in Merseburg, Dollbergen, and Hamburg; harbours in Bremen and Kiel; and factories in Mannheim and Weimar.

Other missions included bombing airfields, gun positions, V-weapon sites (total of nine "No Ball" missions beginning 20 June), and railway bridges in France in preparation for or in support of the invasion of Normandy in June 1944; striking road junctions and troop concentrations in support of ground forces pushing across France, July–August 1944; hitting gun emplacements near Arnhem to minimize transport and glider losses during the airborne invasion of the Netherlands in September 1944; and bombing enemy installations in support of ground troops during the Battle of the Bulge (December 1944 – January 1945) and the assault across the Rhine (March–April 1945).

The 486th Bomb Group returned to Drew Field, Tampa, Florida, during August 1945 and was inactivated on 7 November.

=== Cold War ===
On 30 September 1954 the 69th Pilotless Bomber Squadron was assigned to Hahn AB, West Germany, assigned to the 50th Fighter Bomber Wing. The 69th was attached to the renamed 50th Fighter Day Wing on 14 March 1955. The 69th PBS was assigned to the 7382d Guided Missile Group, which became the 7382d Tactical Missile Group in January 1956.

The 69th PBS was renamed to 69th Tactical Missile Squadron 15 April 1956. The unit manned the TM-61A Matador, which was later replaced by the TM-61C Matador. On 3 August 1956, the 69th Tactical Missile Squadron became part of the 701st Tactical Missile Wing, headquartered at Hahn AB with the discontinuation of the 7382d Tactical Missile Group.

On 18 June 1958, the 69th TMS was inactivated and replaced at Hahn by the 405th Tactical Missile Squadron when the 701st Tactical Missile Wing was inactivated and replaced with the 38th Tactical Missile Wing. The TM-76 A Mace replaced the TM-61C.

The 586th Tactical Missile Group was activated at Hahn Air Base as part of the new 38th TMW and became the headquarters for the 405th TMS, the 586th MMS, and the 586th SS. The 405th TMS operated the TM-76A Mace missile. The group trained and remained prepared for tactical missile operations.

The 586th Tactical Missile Group was inactivated 25 September 1962, and a new launch squadron, the 89th Tactical Missile Squadron was created to share duties with the 405th TMS. All missile units of the former 586th TMG at Hahn then reported directly to the 38th Tactical Missile Wing at Sembach AB.

On 25 September 1966 all TM-76A, then renumbered to MGM-13A, Mace tactical missile operations at Sembach AB and Hahn AB were inactivated.

In the 1980s, the 486th Tactical Missile Wing was the final (of six; also 303rd TMW RAF Molesworth, UK, 501st TMW RAF Greenham Common, UK, 485th TMW Florennes AB, Belgium, 487th TMW Comiso AS, Sicily, Italy, 38th TMW Wueschheim AS, W. Germany) US Air Forces in Europe (USAFE) BGM-109G Gryphon GLCM (Ground Launch Cruise Missile) wing to activate in Europe at (Royal Netherlands Air Force) Woensdrecht Air Base, the Netherlands, in Hoogerheide (Brabant) just north of Antwerp, Belgium, and was also the first to inactivate (27 August 1987) following the Jan 1987 signing of the Intermediate Nuclear Force (INF) Treaty between the U.S.' President Reagan and the Soviet Union's Gorbachev. 64 missiles that were to be assigned to the 486 TMW's Tactical Missile Squadrons—that would disperse to the field from their on base hardened shelter-secured GLCM Alert & Maintenance Area (GAMA) in OPCON threat warning conditions under its concept of operations, were supposed to be assigned, however, the wing did not actually receive operational missiles before beginning to phase down mission/base closure on 20 September 1988 and USAF personnel were reassigned to different bases and the (still under construction contracts) base was returned to the Dutch.

=== 2003 invasion of Iraq ===
The 486th Air Expeditionary Wing was activated prior to the 2003 invasion of Iraq. It was most recently located at Ahmad al-Jaber Air Base, Kuwait.

Units listed in campaign streamer bestowal documents include:

- HQ 486th Expeditionary Maintenance Group
- HQ 486th Expeditionary Medical Group
- HQ 486th Expeditionary Mission Support Group
- HQ 486th Expeditionary Operations Group
- 486th Expeditionary Aircraft Maintenance Squadron
- 486th Expeditionary Civil Engineer Squadron
- 486th Expeditionary Communications Squadron
- 486th Expeditionary Logistics Readiness Squadron
- 486th Expeditionary Maintenance Squadron
- 486th Expeditionary Operations Support Squadron
- 486th Expeditionary Security Forces Squadron
- 486th Expeditionary Services Squadron

== Lineage ==
- Established as the 486th Bombardment Group (Heavy) on 14 September 1943

Activated on 20 September 1943
Redesignated 486th Bombardment Group, Heavy on 25 January 1944
Inactivated on 7 November 1945

- Consolidated with the 586th Tactical Missile Group as the 486th Tactical Missile Wing on 10 October 1984

586th Tactical Missile Group

- Established as the 586th Tactical Missile Group on 3 August 1956

Activated on 15 September 1956
Discontinued and inactivated on 25 September 1962

- Consolidated with the 486th Bombardment Group as the 486th Tactical Missile Wing on 10 October 1984

486th Tactical Missile Wing

Activated on 27 August 1987
Inactivated on 30 September 1988
Redesignated 486th Air Expeditionary Wing and converted to provisional status on 30 January 2003 and allotted to Air Combat Command to activate or inactivate as needed

=== Assignments ===
- 16th Bombardment Operational Training Wing, 20 September 1943
- 21st Bombardment Wing, 9 March 1944
- 92d Combat Bombardment Wing, 4 April 1944 (attached to 4th Combat Bombardment Wing after 15 November 1944
- 4th Combat Bombardment Wing, 16 February 1945
- 14th Combat Bombardment Wing (later 14th Bombardment Wing), 16 June 1945
- Third Air Force, c. 3 September-7 November 1945
- 701st Tactical Missile Wing, 15 September 1956
- 38th Tactical Missile Wing, 18 June 1958 – 25 September 1962
- Seventeenth Air Force, 27 August 1987 – 30 September 1988
- Air Combat Command to activate or inactivate at any time after 30 January 2003

=== Components ===
- 69th Tactical Missile Squadron: 15 September 1956 – 18 June 1958
- 405th Tactical Missile Squadron: 18 June 1958 – 25 September 1962
- 832d Bombardment Squadron: 20 September 1943 – 7 November 1945
- 833d Bombardment Squadron: 20 September 1943 – 7 November 1945
- 834th Bombardment Squadron: 20 September 1943 – 7 November 1945
- 835th Bombardment Squadron: 20 September 1943 – 7 November 1945

=== Stations ===
- Davis–Monthan Field, Arizona, 20 September 1943
- McCook Army Air Field, Nebraska, 26 October 1943
- Davis–Monthan Field, Arizona, 9 November 1943 – March 1944
- England (flight echelon), 19 March 1944
- RAF Sudbury (AAF-174), England, 5 April 1944 – 26 August 1945
- Drew Field, Florida, 3 September-7 November 1945
- Hahn Air Base, West Germany, 15 September 1956 – 25 September 1962
- Woensdrecht Air Base, Netherlands, 27 August 1987 – 30 September 1988

BGM-109G Missile site located at: 51°26′21″N 004°21′09″E

- Ahmad al-Jaber Air Base, Kuwait, 2003

Matador/Mace dispersed missile locations

- Site IV "Veronica" - 7.0 miles (11.3 km) ENE of Hahn AB (89th TMS) 49°59′58″N 007°23′58″E

Closed since 1967. Missile shelters torn down, in very dilapidated state, appears to be used as a storage yard.

- Site V "Pot Fuse" - 7.0 miles (11.3 km) ESE of Hahn AB (405th TMS) 49°54′48″N 007°24′46″E

Abandoned since 1961. Shelters torn down, site very obscured by trees and other vegetation in thick woodland area. Now the site is in use for gaining solar power.

- Site VI "Heroin" – 9.7 miles (15.6 km) NE of Hahn AB (405th TMS) 50°02′37″N 007°25′32″E

After 405th TMS left this site was transferred to US Army and converted into a Nike-Hercules Air Defense missile site; operational 1970–1979. The area was transferred back to USAF in 1982 and was converted again; this time into a Cruise missile Ground Alert Maintenance Area. The 38th Tactical Missile Wing became operational with its BGM-109 Gryphon cruise missiles at this location 1985 and was inactivated 1991 after the signing of the INF treaty. Today the site is in use of the German Armed Forces as a training area.

=== Aircraft and missiles ===
- Consolidated B-24 Liberator, 1943–1944
- Boeing B-17 Flying Fortress, 1944–1945
- MGM-1 Matador, 1956–1960
- T-33 Shooting Star, 1956–1958
- MGM-13 Mace, 1960–1962
- None, 1987–1988

== See also ==
- List of BGM-109G GLCM Units
