= 542nd Combat Sustainment Wing =

542nd Combat Sustainment Wing

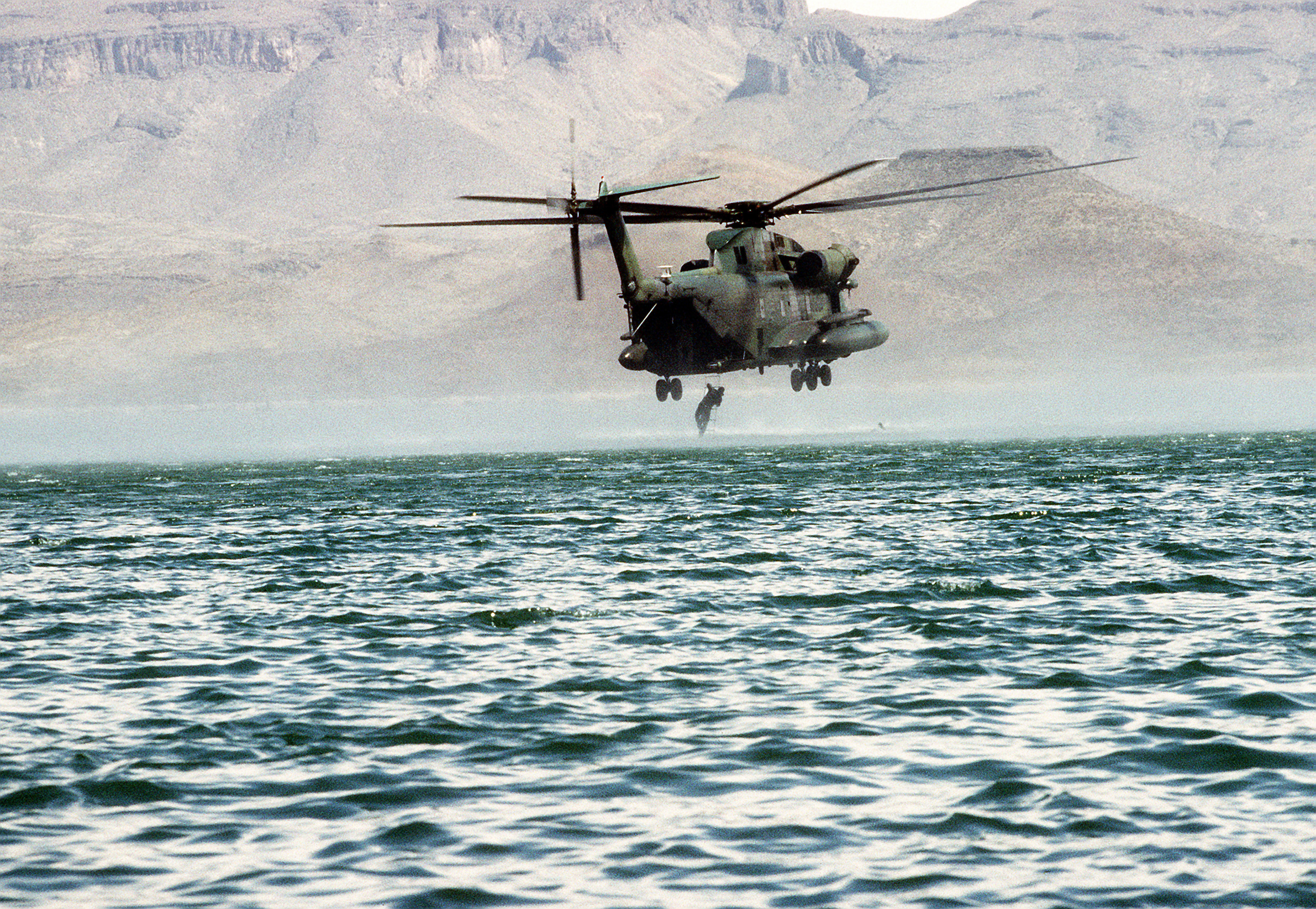
- A member of a Navy SEAL team climbs aboard a 1550th Combat Crew Training Wing MH-53J Pave Low III helicopter at Elephant Butte Lake
- Active: 1943–1945, 1971–1994, 2005–2010
- Country: United States
- Branch: United States Air Force
- Role: Logistics Support
- Part of: Air Force Materiel Command
- Engagements: European Theater of World War II
- Decorations: Air Force Outstanding Unit Award

Commanders
- Notable commanders: General Hunter Harris, Jr.

Insignia
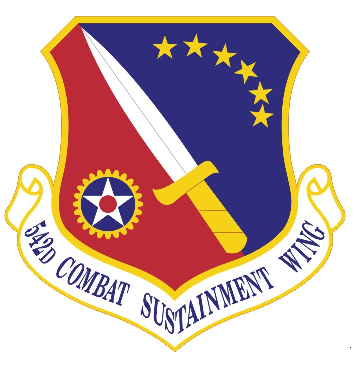
- 542nd Combat Sustainment Wing emblem (approved 9 June 2005)

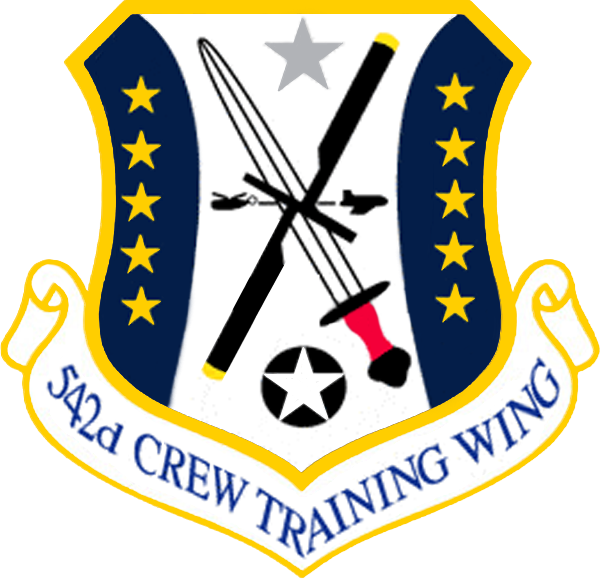
- 1550th Combat Crew Training Wing emblem (approved 30 Aug 1972 (Note: This emblem was retained by the 542nd Crew Training Wing.)

The 542nd Combat Sustainment Wing, sometimes written as 542d Combat Sustainment Wing, is an inactive wing of the United States Air Force last stationed at Robins Air Force Base, Georgia. It was inactivated in June 2010.

The wing was first organized in England as the 92nd Bombardment Wing, a heavy bombardment headquarters of VIII Bomber Command during World War II and took part in the air offensive against Germany until the surrender of Germany in 1945. In 1973, Military Airlift Command (MAC) activated the 1550th Aircrew Test and Training Wing at Hill Air Force Base, Utah. The wing trained aircrews for MAC, Air Mobility Command and Air Education and Training Command from 1971 to 1994 for search and rescue and special operations missions. In 1991 the wing was renumbered and consolidated with the 92nd Bombardment Wing as the 542nd Crew Training Wing. It was inactivated in 1994 and its mission, personnel and equipment were transferred to the 58th Special Operations Wing, which was simultaneously activated. The wing was redesignated the 542nd Combat Sustainment Wing in 2005 and activated as a logistics support organization, part of the Air Force Materiel Command Transformation project.

== History ==
=== World War II ===
The wing was originally organized in 1943 as the 92d Bombardment Wing, (Note: This wing is not related to the 92d Bombardment Wing, which was active from 1947 to 1991. Ravenstein, pp. 128–130) an operational command wing for Eighth Air Force. The wing entered combat on 11 December 1943, but its groups were withdrawn and it was not operational again until May 1944, although it conducted flying training operations in April. The wing flew in combat in the European Theater until November 1944 when its assigned bombardment groups were attached to another wing. In February 1945 the groups were reassigned. The wing returned to the United States in July 1945 and was disbanded the following month.

=== Crew Training ===
The 1550th Aircrew Test and Training Wing was activated in 1973 at Hill Air Force Base, Utah, where it trained all USAF helicopter aircrews and trained HC-130 crews for search and rescue missions. It also provided pararescue training and, operational test and evaluation of materiel, and performed local search and rescue missions. It moved to Kirtland Air Force Base, New Mexico. in 1976 and expanded its mission to include special operations training. By 1990, the wing's primary focus would be on special operations training. In 1983, the wing deployed three aircraft to support Operation Urgent Fury, the invasion of Grenada in the Windward Islands.

From 1984 it focused on the training mission and was redesignated the 1550th Combat Crew Training Wing. In 1991, as the Air Force abolished the MAJCON (four-digit) unit system, the wing was merged with the 92d Bombardment Wing and renamed the 542d Crew Training Wing. Along with the new name, the wing acquired three groups and assumed host responsibility for Kirtland from the 1606th Air Base Wing as it reorganized as a USAF Objective Wing. That same year it deployed aircrew, maintenance personnel and operations personnel to support Operation Desert Storm. Wing aircrews were responsible for the rescue of seven aircrew during the operation. It also deployed personnel to support Operation Provide Hope in Somalia. At the start of 1993, Kirtland Air Force Base transferred to Air Force Materiel Command, and the wing lost its responsibility to act as host together with two of its groups.

With General Merrill McPeak's call to retain historic United States Air Force units on the active list, the 542d was inactivated on 1 April 1994, while the newly redesignated 58th Special Operations Wing took over its training mission.

=== Logistics Operations ===
The wing was again activated in 2005 as the 542d Combat Sustainment Wing as part of the Air Force Materiel Command Transformation project, which replaced the staff agencies at Air Logistics Centers with wings, groups, and squadrons. Its mission was to design, acquire, install, and sustain electronic warfare, avionics, support equipment, vehicles, missiles, automatic test systems and weapons. It was responsible for supply chain management for F-15, C-130 and C-5 aircraft and provided calibration standards and certification of Precision Measurement Laboratories worldwide. It was responsible for life-cycle management of over 800 systems valued at over $56 Billion. Its 542d Combat Sustainment Group supported assigned electronic warfare systems, the 642d Combat Sustainment Group supported assigned support equipment systems, the 752d Combat Sustainment Group supported assigned electronics systems, the 762d Combat Sustainment Group managed logistics support for all assigned systems, and its 782d Combat Sustainment Group supported assigned armament systems. the 742d Combat Sustainment Group supported precision measurement equipment worldwide.

== Lineage ==
92d Bombardment Wing

- Constituted as 92d Bombardment Wing (Heavy) on 25 October 1943

Activated on 1 November 1943
Redesignated 92d Combat Bombardment Wing, Heavy on 24 August 1944
Redesignated 92d Bombardment Wing, Heavy on 22 November 1944
Disbanded on 28 August 1945.

- Reconstituted on 31 July 1985 and redesignated 542d Combat Crew Training Wing

Consolidated with 1550th Combat Crew Training Wing on 1 October 1991

1550th Combat Crew Training Wing

- Designated as the 1550th Aircrew Test and Training Wing and activated on 1 April 1971

Redesignated 1550th Combat Crew Training Wing on 15 May 1984
Consolidated with the 542d Combat Crew Training Wing on 1 October 1991

Consolidated Wing

- Redesignated 542d Crew Training Wing on 1 October 1991

Inactivated on 1 April 1994

- Redesignated 542d Combat Sustainment Wing on 31 January 2005

Activated on 4 March 2005.
Inactivated on 30 June 2010

=== Assignments ===
- VIII Bomber Command, 1 November 1943
- 3d Bombardment Division (later, 3d Air Division), 31 March 1944 – 22 June 1945
- Second Air Force, 23 July 1945 – 28 August 1945
- Aerospace Rescue and Recovery Service, 1 April 1971
- Twenty-Third Air Force, 1 October 1983
- Twenty-Second Air Force 21 May 1990
- Nineteenth Air Force 1 July 1993 – 1 April 1994
- Warner Robins Air Logistics Center, 4 March 2005 – 30 June 2010

=== Stations ===
- Polebrook, England (Station 110), 1 November 1943
- Camp Blainey, England (Station 116), ca. 12 December 1943
- Sudbury, England (Station 174), ca, 2 March 1944
- Bury St Edmunds (Station 468), England, ca. 18 November 1944
- Elveden Hall (Station 116), England, 12 February 1945 – ca. 13 July 1945
- Sioux Falls Army Air Field, South Dakota, 23 July 1945 – 28 August 1945
- Hill Air Force Base, Utah, 1 April 1971
- Kirtland Air Force Base, New Mexico 15 March 1976 – 1 April 1994
- Robins Air Force Base, Georgia, 4 March 2005 – 30 Jun 2010

=== Components ===
==== Groups ====
World War II

- 351st Bombardment Group, 1 November 1943 – 15 December 1943
- 401st Bombardment Group, 1 November 1943 – 15 December 1943
- 486th Bombardment Group, 4 April 1944 – ca. 12 February 1945
- 487th Bombardment Group, 30 June 1944 – 10 February 1945

Crew Training

- 542d Medical Group, 1 October 1991 – 1 January 1993
- 542d Operations Group, 1 October 1991 – 1 October 1994
- 542d Support Group, 1 October 1991 – 1 January 1993

Crew Training and Logistics Operations

- 542d Logistics Group (later 542d Electronic Warfare Systems Sustainment Group, 542d Combat Sustainment Group), 1 October 1991 – 1 October 1994, 4 March 2005 – 30 June 2010

Logistics Operations

- 542d Armament Sustainment Gp, 4 March 2005 – 28 April 2006
- 542d Automatic Test Sustainment Gp, 4 March 2005 – 28 April 2006
- 542d Electronics Sustainment Gp, 4 March 2005 – 28 April 2006
- 542d Materiel Sustainment Gp, 4 March 2005 – 28 April 2006
- 542d Support Equipment and Vehicle Sustainment Gp, 4 March 2005 – 28 April 2006
- 562d Combat Sustainment Group, 17 Apr 2006 – 30 Jun 2010
- 642d Combat Sustainment Group, 17 Apr 2006 – 30 Jun 2010
- 742d Combat Sustainment Group, 17 Apr 2006 – 30 Jun 2010
- 752d Combat Sustainment Group, 17 Apr 2006 – 30 Jun 2010
- 762d Combat Sustainment Group, 17 Apr 2006 – 30 Jun 2010
- 782d Combat Sustainment Group, 17 Apr 2006 – 30 Jun 2010

==== Squadrons ====
- 589th Combat Sustainment Squadron, 17 Apr 2006 – 30 Jun 2010
- 1550th Flying Training Squadron, 1 April 1971 – 1 October 1991
- 1551st Flying Training Squadron, 1 April 1971 – 1 October 1991
- 1552d Flying Training Squadron, 1 April 1971 – 31 December 1972
- 1550th Avionics Maintenance Squadron, 1 April 1971 – 30 Sep 1973
- 1550th Consolidated Aircraft Maintenance Squadron, 1 July 1974 – 1 April 1977
- 1550th Field Maintenance Squadron, 1 April 1971 – 1 July 1974, 1 April 1977 – 1 October 1991
- 1550th Organizational Maintenance Squadron, 1 April 1971 – 1 July 1974, 1 April 1977 – 1 October 1991
- 1550th Student Squadron, 1 April 1971 – 1 March 1973
- 1550th Technical Training Squadron, 1 March 1973 – 1 October 1991

=== Aircraft ===
- Boeing B-17 Flying Fortress, 1943–1945
- Consolidated B-24 Liberator, 1944
- Lockheed HC-130 Hercules, 1971–1994

Lockheed JC-130 Hercules, 1986–1987
Lockheed MC-130 Hercules, 1993–1994

- Bell HH-1 Iroquois (Huey), 1973–1975

Bell TH-1 Iroquois (Huey), 1971–1977
Bell UH-1 Iroquois (Huey), 1971–1994

- H-3, 1971–1972

Sikorsky CH-3, 1976–1994
Sikorsky HH-3 (Jolly Green Giant), 1973–1994

- Kaman HH-43 Huskie, 1971–1975
- Sikorsky H-53, 1971–1973

Sikorsky CH-53, 1973–1994
Sikorsky HH-53 (Super Jolly), 1973–1994
Sikorsky MH-53 PAVE LOW, 1983–1994

- Sikorsky UH-60 Black Hawk, 1988–1994

=== Awards ===
Award streamer	Award	Dates	Notes
	Air Force Outstanding Unit Award	1 April 1974 – 31 March 1976	1550th Aircrew Test and Training Wing
	Air Force Outstanding Unit Award	1 April 1976 – 31 March 1978	1550th Aircrew Test and Training Wing
	Air Force Outstanding Unit Award	1 July 1985 – 30 June 1987	1550th Combat Crew Training Wing
	Air Force Outstanding Unit Award	1 July 1987 – 30 June 1989	1550th Combat Crew Training Wing

Campaign Streamer	Campaign	Dates	Notes
	Air Offensive, Europe	2 November 1943 – 5 June 1944	92d Bombardment Wing
	Normandy	6 June 1944 – 24 July 1944	92d Bombardment Wing
	Northern France	25 July 1944 – 14 September 1944	92d Combat Bombardment Wing
	Rhineland	15 September 1944 – 21 March 1945	92d Combat Bombardment Wing (later 92d Bombardment Wing)
	Ardennes-Alsace	16 December 1944 – 25 January 1945	92d Bombardment Wing
