= 571st Strategic Missile Squadron =

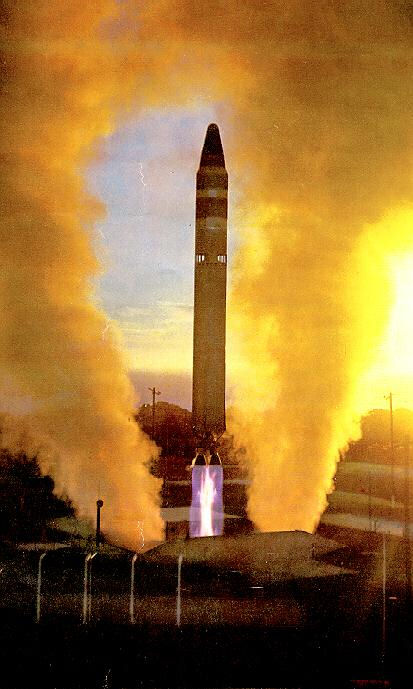
- LGM-25C Titan II Test Launch at Vandenberg AFB, California
- Active: 1942–1945; 1962–1983
- Country: United States
- Branch: United States Air Force
- Type: Squadron
- Role: Intercontinental ballistic missile
- Engagements: European Theater of Operations
- Decorations: Distinguished Unit Citation; Air Force Outstanding Unit Award

Insignia
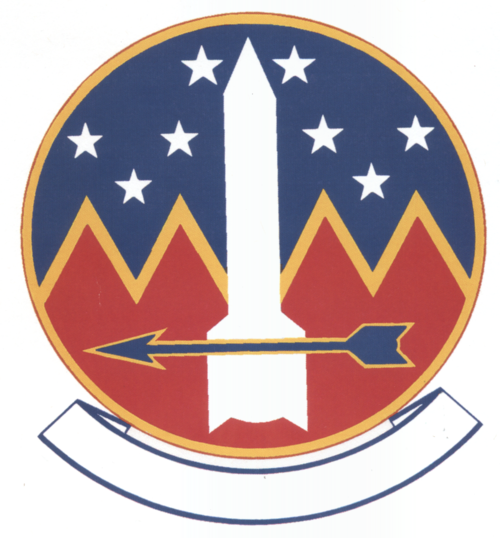
- 571st Strategic Missile Squadron emblem (Note: Approved 19 April 1065. Description: On a blue and red disc divided per fess by a gold dancetty barrulet within a narrow gold border a white missile ascending in pale throughout between in chief eight white stars, two, four and two and surmounted fesswise in base by a blue arrow fimbriated gold. Below a white scroll edged blue. Significance: The blue field depicts the sky... with the eight stars representing the two [Distinguished Unit Citations]s and the six campaign credits awarded the unit in World War II. The arrow refers to early air weapons and the missile to recent air weapons with the red field signifying their propulsion forces. The gold bar alludes to lightning and indicates the mighty power of our weapons systems.)

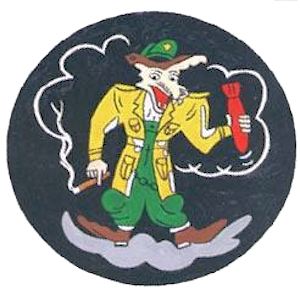
- 571st Bombardment Squadron emblem
- World War II fuselage identification code: FC

The 571st Strategic Missile Squadron is an inactive United States Air Force unit. It was last assigned to the 390th Strategic Missile Wing at Davis-Monthan Air Force Base, Arizona. It was equipped with the LGM-25C Titan II intercontinental ballistic missile, with a mission of nuclear deterrence. The squadron was inactivated as part of the phaseout of the Titan II on 3 December 1983.

The squadron was first activated during World War II as the 571st Bombardment Squadron. After training in the United States, it deployed to the European Theater of Operations, where it participated in the strategic bombing campaign against Germany. It was twice awarded the Distinguished Unit Citation for its actions in combat. After V-E Day, the squadron returned to the United States, where it was inactivated in August 1945.

== History ==
=== World War II ===
==== Activation and training in the United States ====
The squadron was first activated at Geiger Field, Washington in January 1943 as the 571st Bombardment Squadron, one of the four original squadrons of the 390th Bombardment Group. A cadre from the squadron and group went to the Army Air Force School of Applied Tactics at Orlando Army Air Base, Florida for advanced training. The 390th Group was the first to go through this training process, which was followed by later combat groups. The squadron was filled out with Boeing B-17 Flying Fortress heavy bombers beginning the following month and trained at Geiger and at Great Falls Army Air Base, Montana until early July 1943. The squadron's air echelon ferried their B-17s to England via the north Atlantic ferry route, with the first bombers arriving on 13 July. The ground echelon departed for Camp Shanks and the New York Port of Embarkation, sailing on the USAT James Parker on 17 July, reaching England ten days later.

==== Combat in the European Theater ====
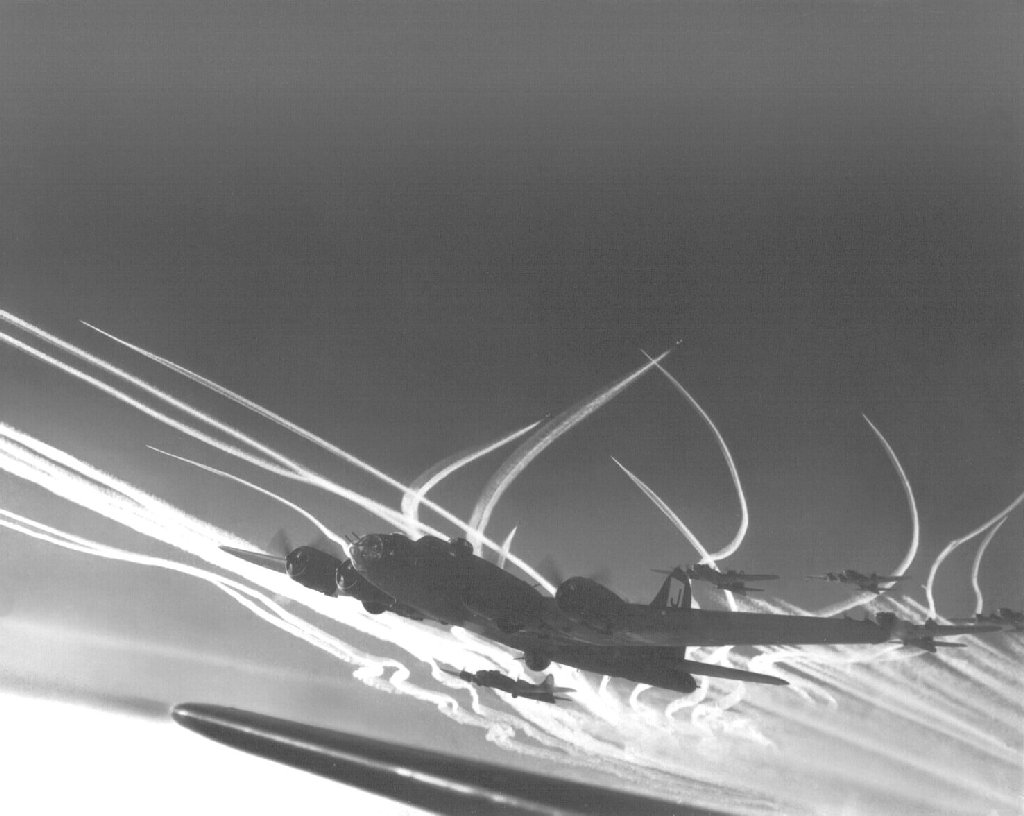
Fighter contrails over a formation of 390th Group B-17s

The squadron arrived at its combat station, RAF Framlingham in July 1943 and flew its first combat mission on 12 August against targets in the Ruhr. Five days later, the squadron attacked the Messerschmitt factory at Regensburg, for which it earned its first Distinguished Unit Citation (DUC). The Regensburg mission was a "shuttle" mission, and the squadron continued after striking the target to recover at Twelfth Air Force bases in North Africa. Poor weather at the departure bases extended the time required to assemble the strike force, making fuel reserves critical. Half of the fighter cover missed the rendezvous, lessening the bombers' protection. For an hour and a half after its entry into German airspace, the strike force bore attacks from German interceptors. The 390th Group suffered the heaviest losses of the leading wing, but had the best bombing results, which destroyed equipment used for the assembly of the Me 262 jet fighter, delaying its introduction into service.

On 14 October 1943, the squadron carried out an attack on the ball bearing factories at Schweinfurt, braving unrelenting attacks by enemy fighters, despite which, the 390th Group had the highest accuracy of the attacking force. For this mission it received a second DUC. In late February 1944, the squadron participated in Big Week, the concentrated assault on Germany's aircraft manufacturing industry, including plants manufacturing aircraft instruments and depots for aviation supplies. Other strategic targets included attacks on navy bases at Bremen, bridges at Cologne, marshalling yards at Frankfurt am Main, factories at Mannheim, synthetic oil plants at Merseburg, and oil refineries at Zeitz.

The squadron was occasionally diverted from the strategic bombing campaign to fly air support and interdiction missions. It bombed near Caen fifteen minutes before the first landings on the Normandy coast on D Day. It provided support during Operation Cobra, the breakout at Saint Lo in late July 1944. During the Battle of the Bulge from December 1944 through January 1945, it cut German supply lines to the battle area. It attacked Axis air bases to support Operation Varsity, the airborne assault across the Rhine, in March 1945. The squadron flew its last combat mission on 20 April 1945.

==== Return to the United States and inactivation ====
Just prior to and after V-E Day, the squadron dropped food supplies to civilians in the Netherlands. The squadron's aircraft began returning to the United States on 25 June 1945, while the ground echelon sailed on the RMS Queen Elizabeth in early August. The squadron reassembled at Sioux Falls Army Air Field, South Dakota later that month and was inactivated there on 28 August 1945.

=== Intercontinental ballistic missiles ===
The squadron was redesignated the 571st Strategic Missile Squadron and organized at Davis-Monthan Air Force Base, Arizona on 1 May 1962 as a Strategic Air Command (SAC) LGM-25C Titan II intercontinental ballistic missile squadron. The squadron was mostly formed from ground up and was initially concerned with training and duties associated with facility construction, for the first Titan did not arrive until November, and the squadron's first missile silo (571-9) went on operational alert in 1963. When the full squadron went on alert in November 1963, the 390th Wing became the first Titan II wing to go on alert.

The Titan II was an improvement over the Titan I. It used storeable liquid propellant and all inertial guidance. It could be launched from its silo and carried a larger warhead. The squadron operated nine missile sites:

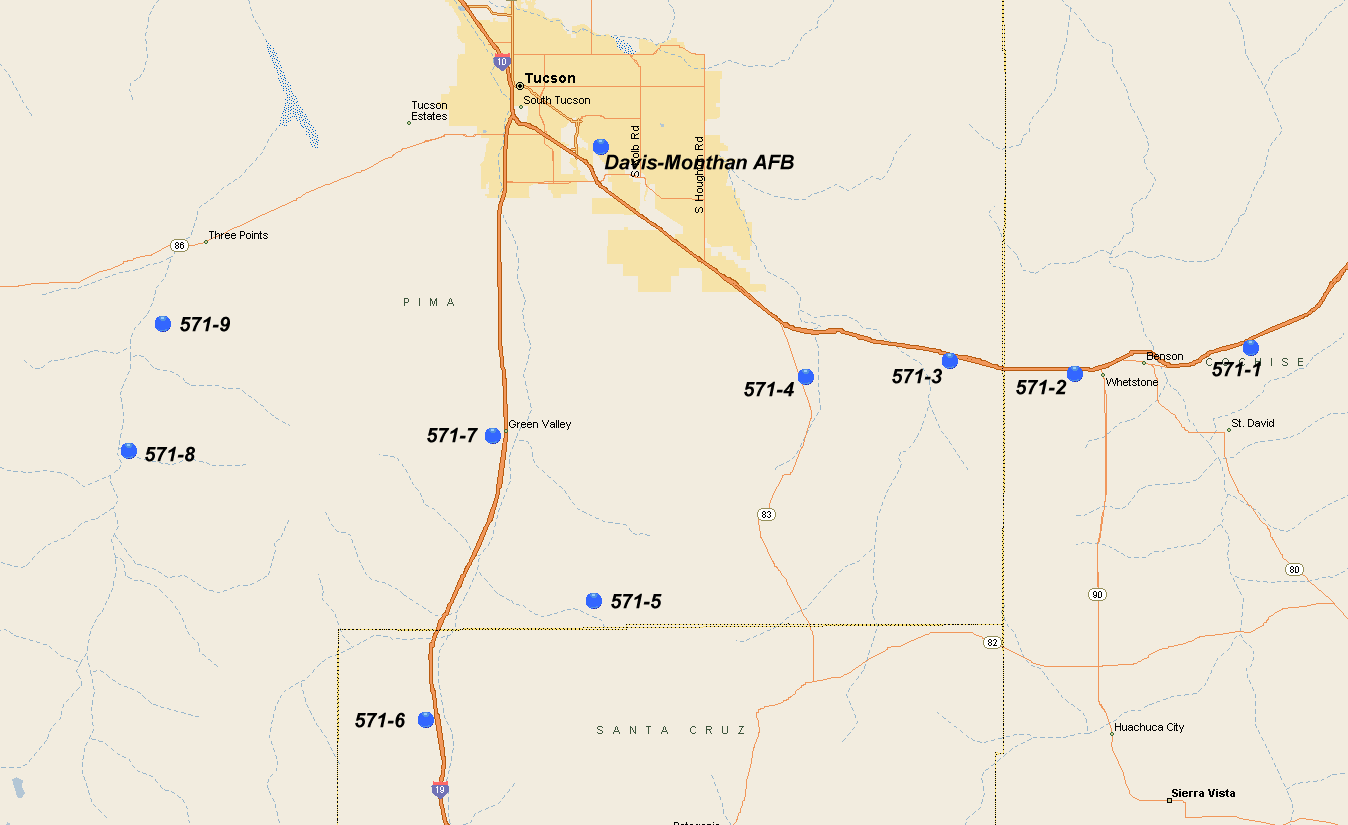
LGM-25C Titan II Sites

571-1 (18 Jul 1963 – 2 Aug 1983), 6.4 mi E of Benson, AZ 31°58′56″N 110°11′08″W
571-2 (17 Sep 1963 – 21 Nov 1983), 4.7 mi W of Benson, AZ 31°57′33″N 110°22′26″W
571-3 (10 Oct 1963 – 4 Oct 1983), 4.6 mi ESE of Pantano, AZ 31°58′17″N 110°30′29″W
571-4 (24 Oct 1963 – 10 Aug 1983), 5.7 mi WSW of Pantano, AZ 31°57′25″N 110°39′46″W
571-5 (24 Jul 1963 – 3 Mar 1983), 8.4 mi SE of Continental, AZ 31°45′13″N 110°53′25″W
571-6 (2 Jul 1963 – 29 Sep 1982), 5.4 mi S of Amado, AZ 31°38′39″N 111°04′14″W
571-7 (15 Jul 1963 – 12 Nov 1982), 3.8 mi NNW of Continental, AZ 31°54′12″N 110°59′57″W
571-8 (15 Apr 1963 – 8 Feb 1984), 10.3 mi W of Keystone Peak, AZ 31°53′17″N 111°23′21″W
571-9 (6 Apr 1963 – 4 Jan 1984), 5.6 mi WSW of Three Points, AZ 32°00′16″N 111°21′16″W

In November 1964, the squadron and the 390th Wing became the first Titan II unit in SAC to complete an operational readiness inspection.

On 2 October 1981, Deputy Secretary of Defense Frank Carlucci directed the inactivation of the Titan II as soon as possible. Project Rivet Cap, the termination of the Titan II weapons system, formally began with the removal of site 571-6 from alert on 30 September 1982. In November 1983, explosive demolition of Titan II silos at Davis-Monthan began. The squadron was inactivated on 2 December 1983. Complexes that were still active were transferred to the 570th Strategic Missile Squadron, and the last former squadron site (571-8) was inactivated on 8 February 1984.

Local aviation enthusiasts associated with the Pima Air Museum won Defense Department approval in 1984 to set aside one silo for permanent display. The silo at Green Valley (571-7) was retained by the Air Force and leased to local government for use as the "Titan Missile Museum." With a training Titan II missile in place, the silo is maintained by a dedicated organization of volunteers from nearby retirement communities. The site was placed on the National Register of Historic Places as the only surviving sample of a Titan II installation. In addition to the launch complex and missile, the museum obtained auxiliary support equipment for display.

== Lineage ==
- Constituted as the 571st Bombardment Squadron (Heavy) on 15 January 1943

Activated on 26 January 1943
Redesignated 571st Bombardment Squadron, Heavy c. 20 August 1943
Inactivated on 28 August 1945

- Redesignated 571st Strategic Missile Squadron and activated on 28 November 1961 (not organized)

Organized on 1 May 1962
Inactivated on 2 December 1983

=== Assignments ===
- 390th Bombardment Group, 26 January 1943 – 28 August 1945
- Strategic Air Command, 28 November 1961 (not organized)
- 390th Strategic Missile Wing, 1 May 1962 – 3 December 1983

=== Stations ===
- Geiger Field, Washington, 26 January 1943
- Great Falls Army Air Base, Montana, 6 June – 4 July 1943
- RAF Framlingham (AAF-153), England, 26 July 1943 – 6 August 1945
- Sioux Falls Army Air Field, South Dakota, 14–28 August 1945
- Davis-Monthan Air Force Base, Arizona, 1 May 1962 – 3 December 1983

=== Aircraft and missiles ===
- Boeing B-17 Flying Fortress, 1943–1945
- LGM-25C Titan II, 1965–1983

=== Awards and campaigns ===
Award streamer	Award	Dates	Notes
	Distinguished Unit Citation	17 August 1943	Germany 571st Bombardment Squadron
	Distinguished Unit Citation	14 October 1943	Germany 571st Bombardment Squadron
	Air Force Outstanding Unit Award	1 July 1969 – 30 June 1970	571st Strategic Missile Squadron
	Air Force Outstanding Unit Award	1 July 1976-30 June 1977	571st Strategic Missile Squadron
	Air Force Outstanding Unit Award	1 July 1977 – 30 June 1979	571st Strategic Missile Squadron
	Air Force Outstanding Unit Award	1 July 1982 – 2 December 1983	571st Strategic Missile Squadron

Campaign Streamer	Campaign	Dates	Notes
	Air Offensive, Europe	26 July 1943 – 5 June 1944	571st Bombardment Squadron
	Air Combat, EAME Theater	26 July 1943 – 11 May 1945	571st Bombardment Squadron
	Normandy	6 June 1944 – 24 July 1944	571st Bombardment Squadron
	Northern France	25 July 1944 – 14 September 1944	571st Bombardment Squadron
	Rhineland	15 September 1944 – 21 March 1945	571st Bombardment Squadron
	Ardennes-Alsace	16 December 1944 – 25 January 1945	571st Bombardment Squadron
	Central Europe	22 March 1944 – 21 May 1945	571st Bombardment Squadron

== See also ==
- List of United States Air Force missile squadrons
- B-17 Flying Fortress units of the United States Army Air Forces
