= 95th Wing =

95th Wing

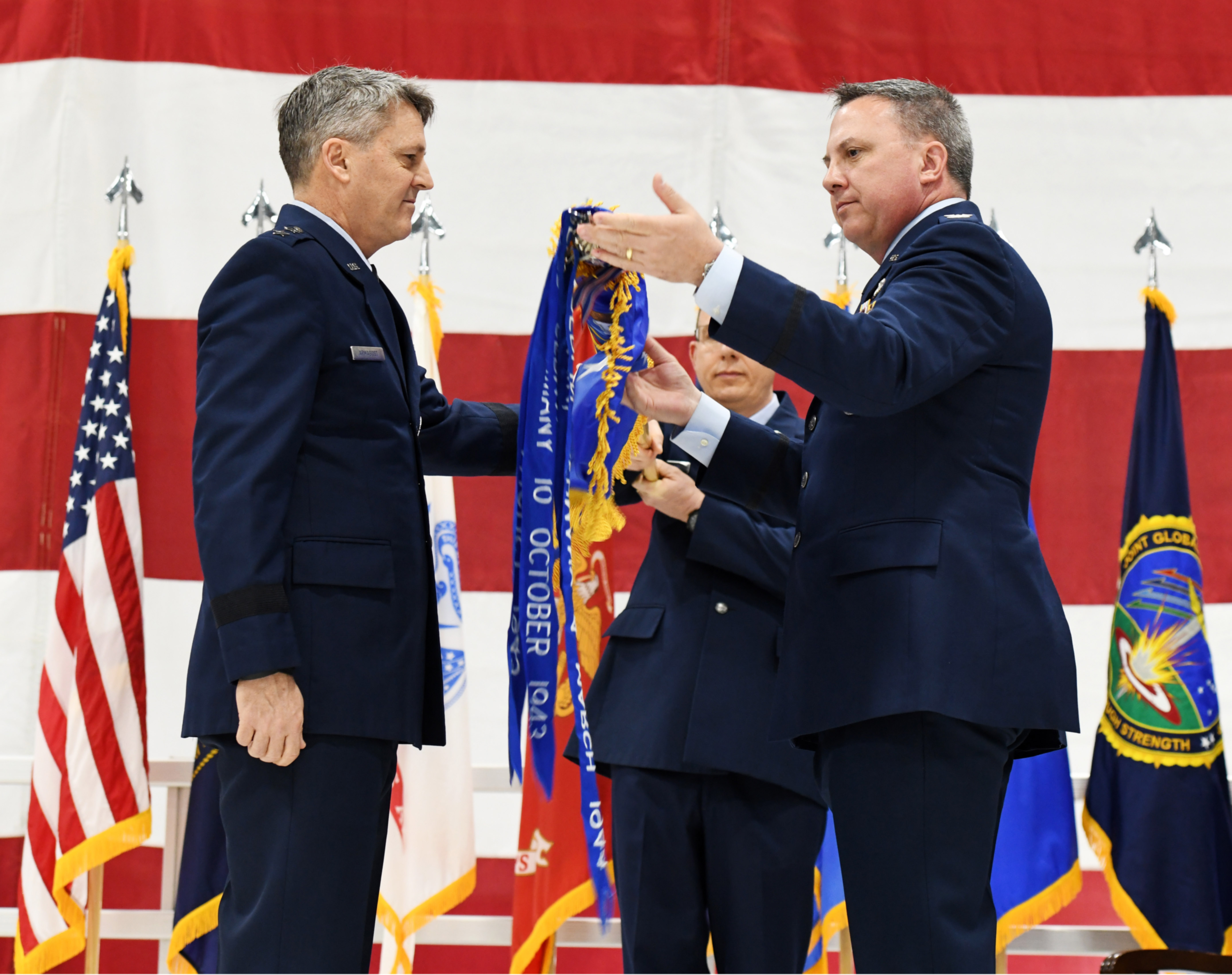
- Col David Leaumont, 95th Wing commander, unfurls the wing guidon during the wing activation ceremony at Offutt AFB
- Active: 1942–1945, 1947–1949, 1952–1966, 1966–1976, 1994–2012, 2025-present
- Country: United States
- Branch: United States Air Force
- Role: Command, control and communications
- Part of: Air Force Global Strike Command
- Garrison/HQ: Offutt AFB, Nebraska
- Nickname: "First B-17's over Berlin – 1944" (WW II)
- Motto: Justice with Victory
- Decorations: Distinguished Unit Citation; Air Force Outstanding Unit Award
- Website: https://www.offutt.af.mil/Units/95th-Wing/

Commanders
- Current commander: Col. David Leaumont
- Notable commanders: Colonel Charles B. DeBellevue; General John K. Gerhart; General John Dale Ryan; Lt Gen Gerald W. Johnson

Insignia
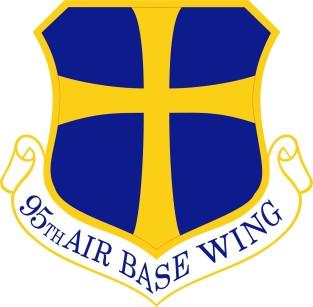
- 95th Wing emblem (Note: Approved 11 October 1995.)

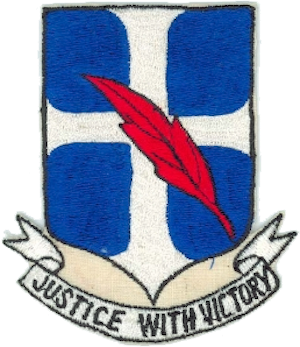
- 95th Bombardment Wing emblem (Note: Approved 3 September 1957. Description: On a shield azure, a Justin cross throughout argent, over all a feather in bend gules, all within a narrow edge white.)

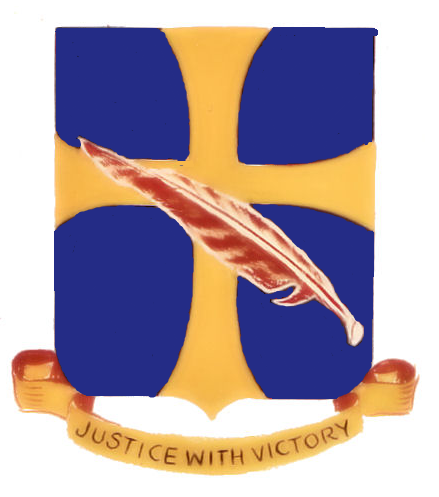
- 95th Bombardment Group emblem (Note: Approved 25 February 1943. Description: On a shield azure, a Justin cross throughout or, over all a feather in bend gules.)
- World War II tail marking: Square B

The 95th Wing is a tenant wing at Offutt Air Force Base that was activated on 28 February 2025.

The wing was previously assigned to the Air Force Flight Test Center of Air Force Materiel Command at Edwards Air Force Base, California, where it was inactivated on 13 July 2012.

During World War II its predecessor, the 95th Bombardment Group, was a Boeing B-17 Flying Fortress unit in England, stationed at RAF Horham. It was the only Eighth Air Force group awarded three Distinguished Unit Citations, with the highest total claims of enemy aircraft destroyed of all Eighth Air Force Bomb Groups − 425 aircraft. It was also the first U.S. Army Air Forces group to bomb Berlin. From 1947 to 1949 the 95th Bombardment Group served in the reserves. It was inactivated when Continental Air Command reorganized its reserve flying units under the wing base organization model.

During the Cold War, the Strategic Air Command (SAC) 95th Bombardment Wing performed strategic bombardment training with Convair B-36 Peacemaker and later Boeing B-52 Stratofortress bombers. It operated to support SAC's global commitments from April 1954 until SAC's phaseout of operations at Biggs Air Force Base, Texas in 1966. The wing was activated later that year as the 95th Strategic Wing at Goose Air Base, Canada to replace the 4082d Strategic Wing. At Goose, it supported forward deployed SAC tankers. It was inactivated in 1976 as the Air Force withdrew from Goose Air Base.

In 1984, the 95th group and wing were consolidated into a single unit. The consolidated unit was redesignated the 95th Air Base Wing and was activated in 1994 as the host organization at Edwards, absorbing the mission, personnel and equipment of the inactivating 650th Air Base Wing.

== Mission ==
The mission of the wing is to operate a set of joint units and capabilities to assure worldwide survivable and enduring command and control to the President, Secretary of Defense, and Chairman of the Joint Chiefs of Staff throughout the entirety of the threat spectrum to deter strategic attack on the United States and enable uninterrupted execution of national security responsibilities. This unit also specializes in organizing, training, and equipping a dedicated team of professionals to execute combatant commanders’ tasks on a global scale.

== History ==
=== World War II ===
==== Training in the United States ====
The wing was activated in 1942 as the 95th Bombardment Group at Barksdale Field, Louisiana with the 334th, 335th, 336th, and 412th Bombardment Squadrons assigned.

The group began training in August at Geiger Field, Washington, where it was equipped with Boeing B-17 Flying Fortresses. The unit trained for combat operations until moving overseas starting in March The unit trained at Ephrata Army Air Base, Washington and Geiger. Final training was conducted at Rapid City Army Air Base, South Dakota from 14 December 1942 to 11 March 1943.

The air echelon processed at Kearney Army Air Field, Nebraska and flew its Forts via the southern route, flying to Florida, Trinidad, the northern coast of Brazil, Dakar, Senegal, and Marrakesh, Morocco to RAF Alconbury in the United Kingdom. The ground echelon moved to Camp Kilmer, then sailed on the RMS Queen Elizabeth to Scotland, arriving in May. The squadron then reunited at RAF Framlingham.

==== Combat with Eighth Air Force ====
The group arrived in England equipped with late model B-17F aircraft equipped with "Tokyo Tanks", additional fuel cells located outboard in the wings that gave this model additional range. It flew its first combat mission on 13 May 1943 against an airfield near Saint-Omer, France. For the next two months the 95th focused on attacking airfields and V-1 flying bomb launch sites in France.

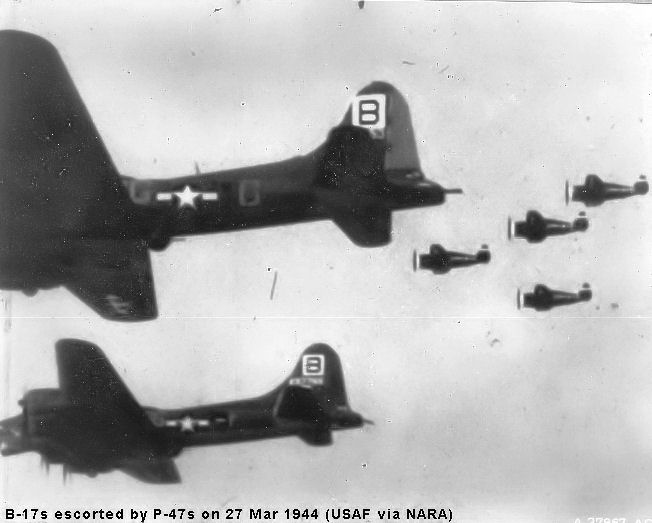
Group Boeing B-17Gs in combat formation (Note: In foreground is Boeing B-17G-85-BO, serial 43-38283. It was initially assigned to the 334th Bombardment Squadron as BG-A. It later transferred to the 336th squadron as ET-A. It crashed at Neustadt, Germany after suffering mechanical failure on 17 March 1945. MACR 13111.)

Eighth Air Force's early experience with its Martin B-26 Marauders convinced it that the Marauders were stationed too far from the continent of Europe to reach a selection of targets. It determined to move them closer to the target areas, and an exchange of bases began. The entire 95th group moved to RAF Horham in June, where they replaced the 323d Bombardment Group, which departed the previous day. A few days later their place at Framlingham was taken by the newly arrived 390th Bombardment Group.

The 95th began strategic bombing operations in July and continued until flying its last operation on 20 April 1945. Its targets included harbors, marshalling yards and other industrial targets along with attacks on cities. On 13 June 1943 the group was leading the 4th Bombardment Wing in an attack on Kiel, Germany. The lead aircraft carried Brigadier General Nathan B. Forrest as an observer. The aircraft was hit by fighters on its approach to the target, and again after the bomb run was complete. It was last seen spiraling out of control with much of its tail shot away. General Forrest was the first United States general officer killed in action in Europe during the war.

The group received its first Distinguished Unit Citation (DUC) during an attack on an aircraft factory at Regensburg, Germany on 17 August 1943 when it maintained its defensive formation despite severe attacks by enemy interceptor aircraft. On 10 October, during an attack on marshalling yards at Münster, Germany, the squadron was subjected to concentrated fighter attacks on the approach to the target and intense flak over the objective. Despite these obstacles, the group's bombs were clustered close to the target. It was awarded a second DUC for withstanding these attacks to bomb its objective.

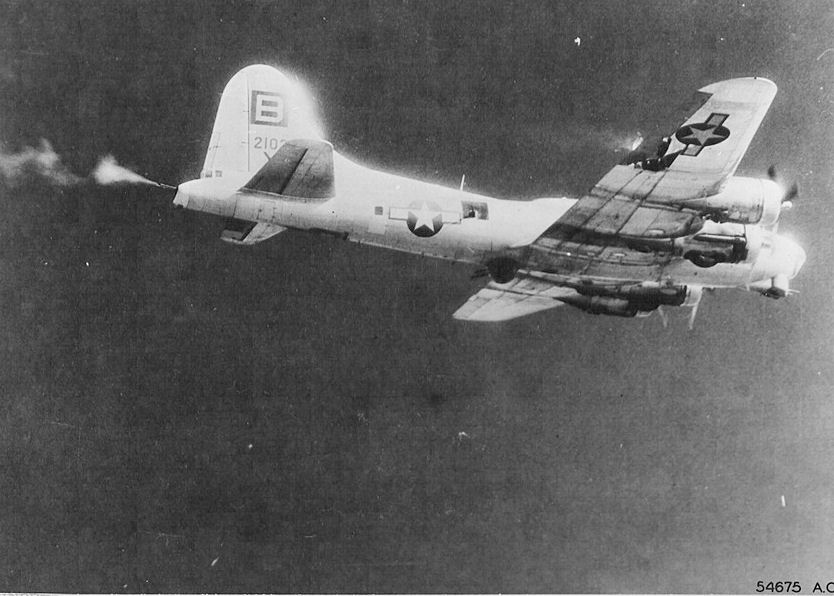
334th squadron B-17 under attack by German fighters, already showing damage to the right wing, with the tail gunner engaging the enemy

From 20 to 25 February 1944 the group participated in the Big Week offensive against the German aircraft manufacturing industry. A few days later, on 4 March, the squadron attacked Berlin despite adverse weather that led other units to either abandon the operation or attack secondary targets. Despite snowstorms and heavy cloud cover, the unit struck its target while under attack from enemy fighters, although the cloud cover required the group to rely on a pathfinder from the 482d Bombardment Group to determine the release point. It received its third DUC for this operation. This mission was the first time any unit from Eighth Air Force had bombed Berlin.

The group was diverted to bombing priority tactical targets during the preparation for and execution of Operation Overlord, the invasion of Normandy in June 1944, attacking communications and coastal defenses. It hit enemy troop concentrations to facilitate the Allied breakout at Saint-Lô. The 95th attacked enemy troop concentrations during the Battle of the Bulge from December 1944 to January 1945 and bombed airfields to support Operation Varsity, the airborne assault across the Rhine in March.

One of the unit's more unusual missions was flown on 18 September 1944, when it led the 13th Combat Bombardment Wing to Warsaw to drop ammunition, food and medical supplies to Polish Resistance forces fighting against German occupation forces. The group landed in the Soviet Union, as it had previously done during shuttle missions to the Soviet Union.

The unit flew its last mission on 20 April 1945, when it attacked marshalling yards near Oranienburg. During its time with Eighth Air Force the 95th flew 320 missions, losing 157 aircraft, but claiming the destruction of 425 German fighters.

In the first week of May, it airdropped food to Dutch citizens in Operation Chow Hound. During the final Chow Hound mission on 7 May one of the group's aircraft had an engine catch fire. The pilot decided to ditch the aircraft when the fire threatened to engulf the entire plane, but hit a swell, causing the aircraft to break up almost at once. This was the last operational loss suffered by Eighth Air Force in World War II. From V-E Day until departing the theater in June, the 95th transported liberated prisoners of war and displaced persons. The air echelon flew their planes back to Bradley Field, Connecticut, while the ground echelon sailed once more on the Queen Elizabeth. The squadron was reunited at Sioux Falls Army Air Field, South Dakota, where it was inactivated on 28 August 1945.

=== Air Force Reserve ===
The 95th Bombardment Group was reactivated in the Air Force Reserve at Memphis International Airport, Tennessee in May 1947 as a Boeing B-29 Superfortress unit, where its training was supervised by the 468th AAF Base Unit (later the 2584th Air Force Reserve Training Center). It is not clear whether or not the wing was fully staffed or equipped. The group was inactivated when Continental Air Command reorganized its reserve units under the wing base organization system in June 1949. The group's personnel and equipment at Memphis were transferred to the 516th Troop Carrier Wing.

=== Bombardment Operations at Biggs Air Force Base ===
The 95th Bombardment Wing was established on 4 June 1952, and activated on 16 June 1952 at Biggs Air Force Base, Texas. (Note: Although the 95th Wing was newly activated, it continued, through temporary bestowal, the history, and honors of the World War II 95th Bombardment Group. This temporary bestowal ended in January 1984, when the wing and group were consolidated into a single unit.) However, because it was not manned, it was not assigned to the Eighth Air Force's 810th Air Division until July 1953, and then minimally manned until September 1953, when it began strategic bombardment training with Convair B-36 Peacemakers. It operated in support of Strategic Air Command (SAC)'s global commitments from April 1954 until February 1966.

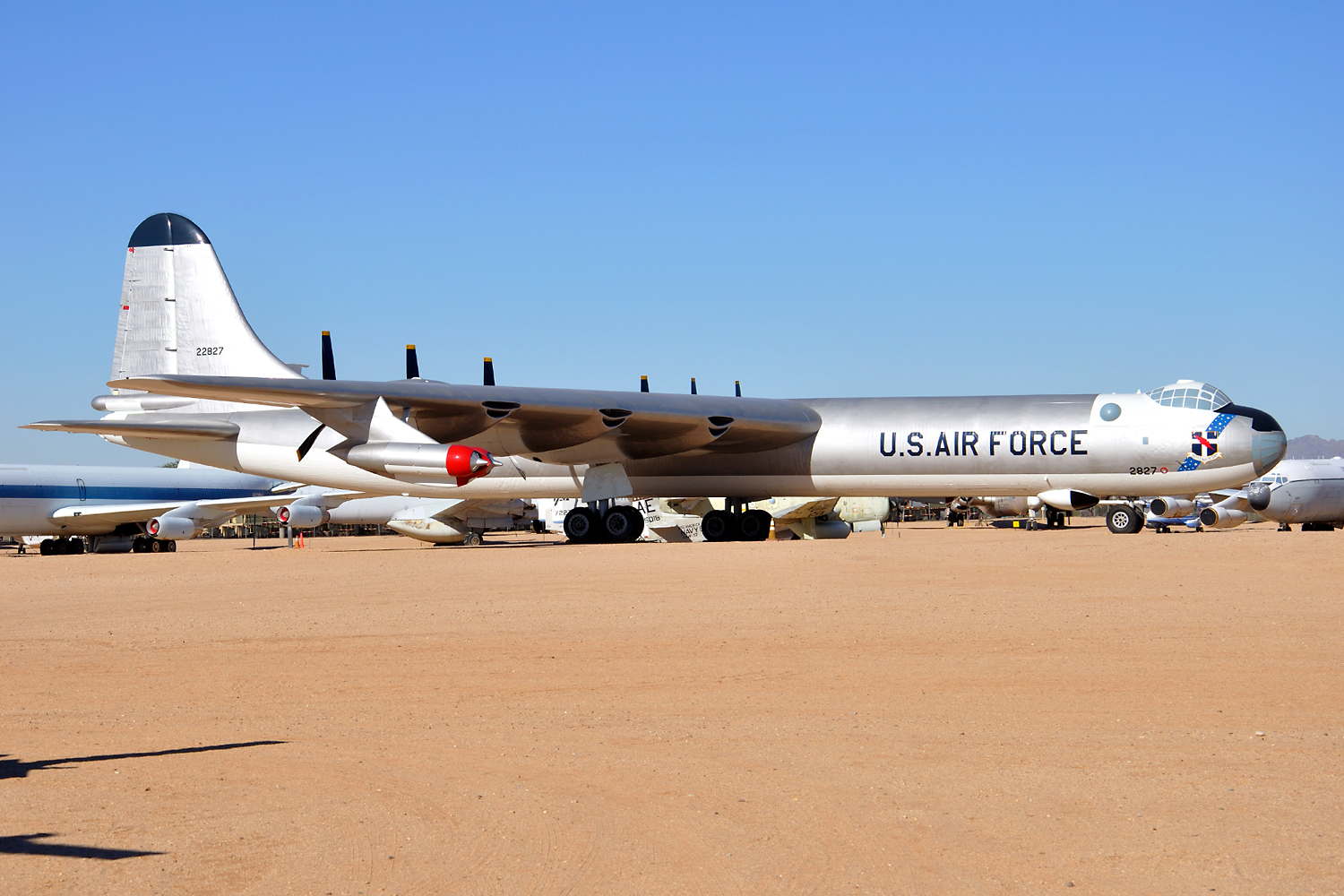
Former 95th Bomb Wing Convair B-36J Peacemaker at the Pima Air Museum

The wing deployed to Andersen Air Force Base, Guam, and operated under control of 3d Air Division from July to November 1955.

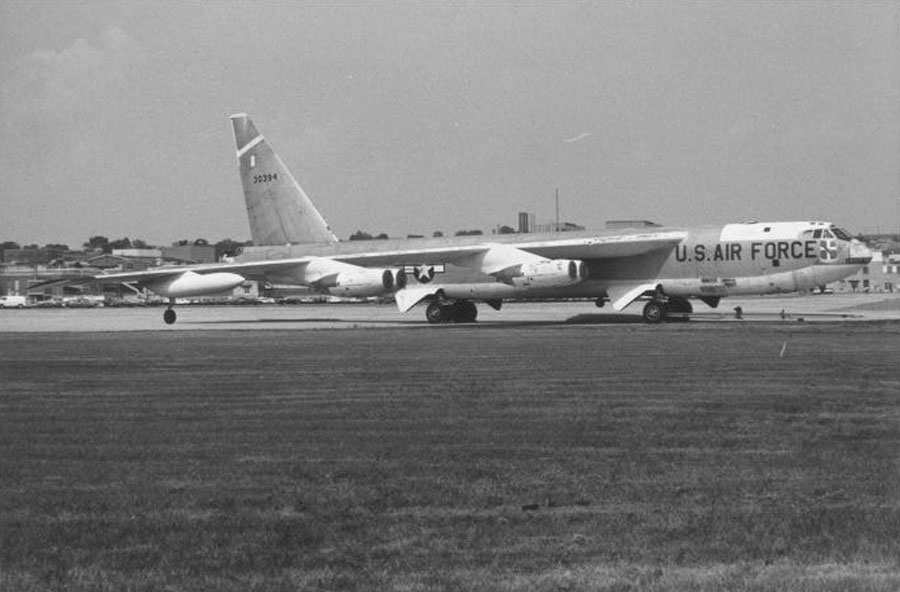
95th Bomb Wing Boeing B-52B

On 12 February 1959, the last B-36J in SAC's inventory departed the wing and Biggs for Amon Carter Field, in Fort Worth, Texas, where it became a display aircraft.

The wing received Boeing B-52 Stratofortresses to replace the B-36s. In May 1959, it added the 917th Air Refueling Squadron with Boeing KC-135 Stratotankers, which became operational in August.

In the late 1950s, SAC established Strategic Wings to disperse its B-52s over a larger number of bases, thus making it more difficult for the Soviet Union to knock out the entire fleet with a surprise first strike. As part of this program, the wing's 335th Bombardment Squadron moved to Bergstrom Air Force Base, Texas on 15 January 1959, where it was assigned to the 4130th Strategic Wing. The 336th Bombardment Squadron moved to Turner Air Force Base, Georgia in July and was assigned to the 4138th Strategic Wing there. The 334th Bombardment Squadron remained at Biggs with the 95th Bomb Wing.

Starting in 1960, one-third of the wing's aircraft were maintained on fifteen-minute alert, fully fueled, armed and ready for combat to reduce vulnerability to a Soviet missile strike. This was increased to half the squadron's aircraft in 1962. The 95th continued to maintain an alert commitment until shortly before inactivation on 25 June 1966 with the transfer of Biggs to the United States Army. Its commitment included periodic airborne alert as part of Operation Chrome Dome.

On 7 April 1961, one of the wing's B-52Bs was participating in an air intercept training mission with a pair of North American F-100 Super Sabres from the 188th Fighter-Interceptor Squadron of the New Mexico Air National Guard. For the exercise the fighters were armed with GAR-8 Sidewinder missiles, which were wired so that only the heat seeking head of the missile was operational. On the sixth pass by the fighters, a Sidewinder launched and struck one of the engine pods on the bomber's left wing. Four on board the B-52 escaped by parachute, but three crewmembers died in the crash. The misfire was blamed on moisture in the connection of the missile to the F-100.

=== Tanker Operations at Goose Air Base ===
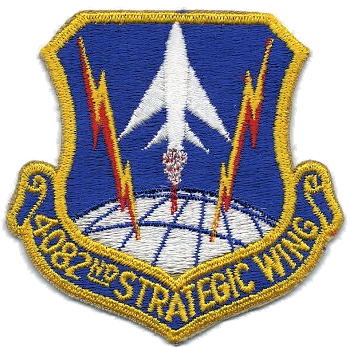
Patch with 4082d Strategic Wing emblem

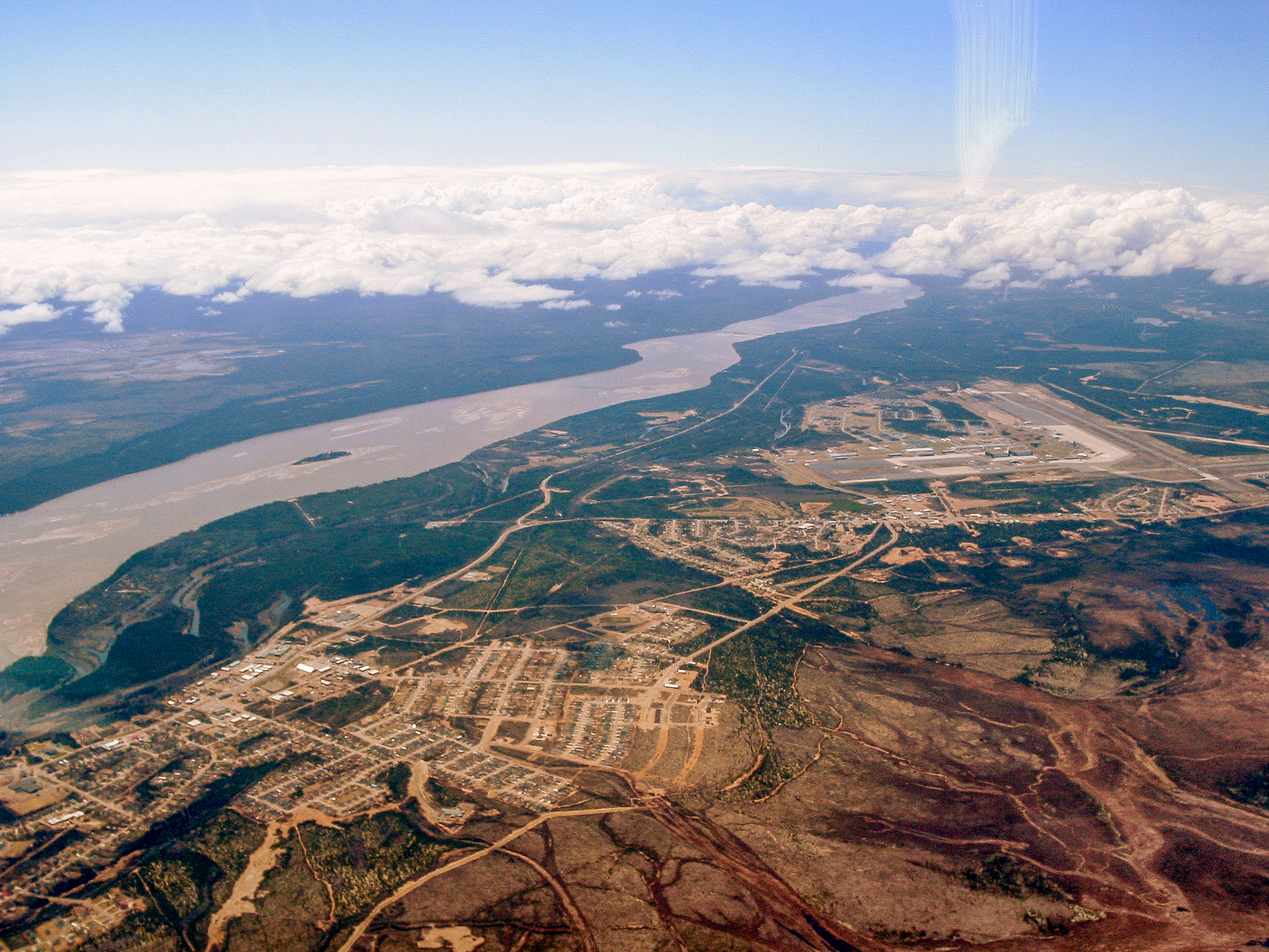
Goose Air Base

In August 1966 the wing was redesignated as the 95th Strategic Wing and moved to Goose Air Base, Newfoundland and Labrador, Canada, where it replaced the 4082d Strategic Wing. The 4082d was organized by SAC on 1 April 1957 as a Major Command controlled (MAJCON) wing (Note: Under the USAF organization and lineage system MAJCON units' lineages (histories, awards, and battle honors) ended with their discontinuance and could never be revived. Ravenstein, Guide to Air Force Lineage and Honors, p. 12.) and assigned to the 45th Air Division when SAC took over Goose from Northeast Air Command. The 4082d controlled forward deployed bombers and tankers. As the host USAF organization for Goose Bay it was assigned the 4082d Air Base Group (later 4082d Combat Support Group) and the 4082d USAF Hospital. (Note: On 1 April 1959 the 868th Medical Group replaced the hospital.)

In order to retain the lineage of its MAJCON 4-digit combat units and to perpetuate the lineage of many currently inactive bombardment units with illustrious World War II records, Headquarters SAC received authority from Headquarters USAF to discontinue its MAJCON strategic wings and to activate Air Force Controlled (AFCON) units, which could carry a lineage and history. (Note: The 95th Wing was entitled to retain the honors (but not the history or lineage) of the 4082d.) The 95th Wing supported SAC's KC-135 alert tanker forces in eastern Canada and the North Atlantic. The wing also provided logistic support for northern radar sites in Canada. In June 1974 the wing was awarded an Air Force Outstanding Unit Award for fighting a forest fire which threatened to spread to the station's fuel storage tanks.

Goose Air Base was transferred to the Canadian Department of National Defense as CFB Goose Bay. The Government of Canada had previously shared responsibility for the operation of the airport with the United States Air Force. In 1975 the Canadian government informed the United States that the Air Force's lease on Goose Bay Airport would not be renewed when it expired on 30 June 1976. The wing phased down for inactivation, closing most USAF operations at Goose AFB between January and September 1976.

=== Base Support at Edwards Air Force Base ===
The wing was reactivated as the 95th Air Base Wing on 1 October 1994, when it replaced the 650th Air Base Wing as the host unit for Edwards Air Force Base, California. It was responsible for operating Edwards, including the infrastructure, communication systems, security, fire protection, transportation, supply, finance, contracting, legal services, personnel and manpower support, housing, education, chapel and quality of life programs on a 301,000-acre (1,220 km^{2}) base in the middle of the Mojave Desert, the second largest base in the USAF.

The wing oversaw base day-to-day operations and provided support for over 12,000 military, federal civilian and contract personnel. Approximately 1500 Air Base Wing personnel directly supported the flight test and evaluation mission of the Air Force Flight Test Center and the 412th Test Wing. The wing was inactivated on 13 July 2012 and its mission transferred to elements of the 412th wing, primarily to the 412th Mission Support Group. The wing's last commander was Col. Amy V. Arwood, who commanded the wing for its last two weeks.

=== Global Strike Command Command and Control ===
On 1 October 2024, Air Force Global Strike Command activated the 95th Wing (Provisional) at Offutt Air Force Base, Nebraska to prepare for the activation of the wing as the 95th Wing. The wing’s focus will be to provide combatant commanders with command and control over assigned forces through global command, control, and communication capabilities and execute strategic requirements as set forth by commanders. It will integrate three units that currently and bring them together under a single command. These units are the 595th Command and Control Group at Offutt, the 253rd Command and Control Group of the Wyoming Air National Guard, and the 610th Command and Control Squadron of Air Force Reserve Command at Davis-Monthan Air Force Base, Arizona. The wing will manage the modernization efforts for the E-4C Survivable Airborne Operations Center, that will replace the aging Boeing E-4B. The wing was activated on 28 February 2025, and the provisional wing was inactivated, along with the 595th Group.

== Lineage ==
95th Bombardment Group

- Constituted as the 95th Bombardment Group (Heavy) on 28 January 1942
- Activated on 15 June 1942

Redesignated 95th Bombardment Group, Heavy on 20 August 1943

- Inactivated on 28 August 1945

Redesignated 95th Bombardment Group, Very Heavy on 13 May 1947

- Activated in the reserve on 29 May 1947
- Inactivated on 27 June 1949
- Consolidated on 31 January 1984 with the 95th Strategic Wing as the 95th Strategic Wing

95th Wing

- Constituted as the 95th Bombardment Wing, Medium on 4 June 1952
- Activated on 16 June 1952

Redesignated 95th Bombardment Wing, Heavy on 8 November 1952

- Discontinued and inactivated on 25 June 1966

Redesignated 95th Strategic Wing on 8 August 1966
Activated on 8 August 1966 (not organized)

- Organized on 2 August 1966
- Inactivated on 30 September 1976
- Consolidated on 31 January 1984 with the 95th Bombardment Group, Very Heavy

Redesignated 95 Air Base Wing on 16 September 1994

- Activated on 1 October 1994
- Inactivated on 13 July 2012
- Redesignated 95th Wing

Activated on 28 February 2025

=== Assignments ===
- III Bomber Command, 15 June 1942
- II Bomber Command, 26 June 1942
- Eighth Air Force, 11 May 1943
- VIII Bomber Command, 19 May 1943
- 4th Bombardment Wing, 25 May 1943 (attached to 402d Provisional Combat Wing Bombardment (Heavy)), 6 June-12 September 1943
- 3d Bombardment Division, 13 September 1943
- 13 Combat Bombardment Wing (Heavy) (later, 13 Bombardment Wing, Heavy), 14 September 1943 – August 1945
- 21 Bombardment Wing, Very Heavy (later, 21 Air Division, Bombardment), 29 May 1947 – 27 June 1949
- 810th Air Division, 16 June 1952 (attached to 3d Air Division), 31 July-4 November 1955
- 819th Strategic Aerospace Division, 1 July 1962
- 12th Strategic Aerospace Division, 1 July 1964 – 25 June 1966
- Strategic Air Command, 8 August 1966 (not organized)
- 45th Air Division, 2 October 1966 – 30 September 1976
- Air Force Flight Test Center, 1 October 1994 – 13 July 2012
- Air Force Global Strike Command, 28 February 2025 – present

=== Components ===
==== Groups ====
- 95th Civil Engineer Group: 1 October 1994 – 15 June 2002
- 95th Combat Support Group (later 95th Support Group, Mission Support Group): 1 January 1959 – 25 June 1966, 2 October 1966 – 30 September 1976, 1 October 1994 – 13 July 2012
- 95th Communications Group: 6 July 2005 – 30 June 2010
- 95th Medical Group (later 95th Tactical Hospital, 95th Medical Group): 16 June 1952 – 1 January 1959, 1 October 1994 – 13 July 2012
- 253rd Command and Control Group (Wyoming Air National Guard): 28 February 2025 – present
- 828th Medical Group, 1 January 1959 – 25 June 1966
- 868th Medical Group (later USAF Hospital, Goose), 2 October 1966 – 30 September 1976

==== Squadrons ====
Operational Squadrons

- 1st Airborne Command and Control Squadron: 28 February 2025 – present
- 334th Bombardment Squadron: 15 June 1942 – 28 August 1945; 29 May 1947 – 27 June 1949; 16 June 1952 – 25 June 1966
- 335th Bombardment Squadron: 15 June 1942 – 28 August 1945; 17 July 1947 – 27 June 1949; 16 June 1952 – 15 January 1959
- 336th Bombardment Squadron: 15 June 1942 – 28 August 1945; 16 July 1947 – 27 June 1949; 16 June 1952 – 1 July 1959
- 412th Bombardment Squadron: 15 June 1942 – 28 August 1945; 16 July 1947 – 27 June 1949
- 610th Command and Control Squadron (Air Force Reserve Command): 28 February 2025 – present
- 625th Strategic Operations Squadron: 28 February 2025 – present
- 917th Air Refueling Squadron: 1 May 1959 – 15 January 1965

Support Squadrons

- 35th Munitions Maintenance Squadron, 1 July 1960 – 25 June 1966
- 95th Armament and Electronics Maintenance Squadron, 16 June 1952 – 25 June 1966
- 95th Comptroller Squadron: 23 January 2007 – 13 July 2012
- 95th Field Maintenance Squadron (later 95th Consolidated Aircraft Maintenance Squadron), 16 June 1952 – 25 June 1966, 2 October 1966 – 30 June 1971
- 95th Periodic Maintenance Squadron (later 95th Organizational Maintenance Squadron, 95th Aircraft Maintenance Squadron), 16 June 1952 – 25 June 1966, 28 February 2025 – present
- 95th Supply Squadron: 1 October 1961 – 1 July 1963
- 595th Aircraft Maintenance Squadron
- 595th Strategic Communications Squadron: 28 February 2025 – present
- 625th Strategic Operations Squadron

=== Stations ===
- Barksdale Field, Louisiana, 15 June 1942
- Pendleton Field, Oregon, 26 June 1942
- Geiger Field, Washington, 28 August 1942
- Ephrata Army Air Base, Washington, 31 October 1942
- Geiger Field, Washington, 24 November 1942
- Rapid City Army Air Base, South Dakota, 17 December 1942 – 11 March 1943
- RAF Framlingham (USAAF Station 153), England, May 1943
- RAF Horham (USAAF Station 119), England, 15 June 1943 – 19 June 1945
- Sioux Falls Army Air Field, South Dakota, c. 14–28 August 1945
- Memphis Municipal Airport, Tennessee, 29 May 1947 – 27 June 1949
- Biggs Air Force Base, Texas, 16 June 1952 – 25 June 1966
- Goose Air Base (later CFB Goose Bay), Canada, 2 October 1966 – 30 September 1976
- Edwards Air Force Base, California, 1 October 1994 – 13 July 2012
- Offutt Air Force Base, Nebraska, 28 February 2025 – present

=== Aircraft ===
- Boeing B-17 Flying Fortress, 1942–1945
- Unknown, 1947–1949
- Convair B-36 Peacemaker, 1953–1959
- Boeing B-52 Stratofortress, 1959–1966
- Boeing KC-135 Stratotanker, 1959–1965; 1966–1975
- Boeing E-4B, 2025–present

=== Awards and campaigns ===
Award streamer	Award	Dates	Notes
	Distinguished Unit Citation, Regensburg, Germany	17 August 1943	95th Bombardment Group
	Distinguished Unit Citation, Münster, Germany	10 October 1943	95th Bombardment Group
	Distinguished Unit Citation, Berlin, Germany	4 March 1944	95th Bombardment Group
	Air Force Outstanding Unit Award	1 July 1970 – 30 June 1971	95th Strategic Wing
	Air Force Outstanding Unit Award	27 June 1974 – 30 June 1974	95th Strategic Wing
	Air Force Outstanding Unit Award	1 May 2009 – 30 April 2011	95th Air Base Wing

Campaign Streamer	Campaign	Dates	Notes
	Air Offensive, Europe	11 May 1943 – 5 June 1944	95th Bombardment Group
	Normandy	6 June 1944 – 24 July 1944	95th Bombardment Group
	Northern France	25 July 1944 – 14 September 1944	95th Bombardment Group
	Rhineland	15 September 1944 – 21 March 1945	95th Bombardment Group
	Ardennes-Alsace	16 December 1944 – 25 January 1945	95th Bombardment Group
	Central Europe	22 March 1944 – 21 May 1945	95th Bombardment Group
	Air Combat, EAME Theater	11 May 1943 – 11 May 1945	95th Bombardment Group

== Notable members ==
- Bernard Kates
- Curt Stone
- Venero "Benny Eggs" Mangano

== See also ==
- B-17 Flying Fortress units of the United States Army Air Forces
- List of B-52 Units of the United States Air Force
- List of MAJCOM wings of the United States Air Force
