= Olympic Arena =

Olympic Arena may refer to:

- Olympic Arena, the United States Air Force Missile Combat Competition
- Hellinikon Olympic Arena in Ellinikon, Athens, Greece, built for the 2004 Olympics and Paralympics
- Jeunesse Arena, Barra da Tijuca, Rio de Janeiro, Brazil, also called Arena Olímpica do Rio (Rio Olympic Arena)
- Father David Bauer Olympic Arena, an ice hockey arena in Calgary, Alberta, Canada
- Copper Box Arena in the Queen Elizabeth Olympic Park in Hackney Wick, London, England, used for the 2012 Summer Olympics
- Olympic Gymnastics Arena in the Olympic Park, Bangi-dong, Songpa-gu, Seoul, South Korea, constructed for the 1988 Olympics
- Herb Brooks Arena, formerly Olympic Center Arena, Lake Placid, New York, built for the 1980 Winter Olympics
- Vikingskipet Olympic Arena in Hamar, Norway, built for the 1994 Winter Olympics
