= RAF Framlingham =

Former Royal Air Force station in Suffolk, England

RAF Framlingham USAAF Station 153
- Located northeast of Ipswich, Suffolk, United Kingdom
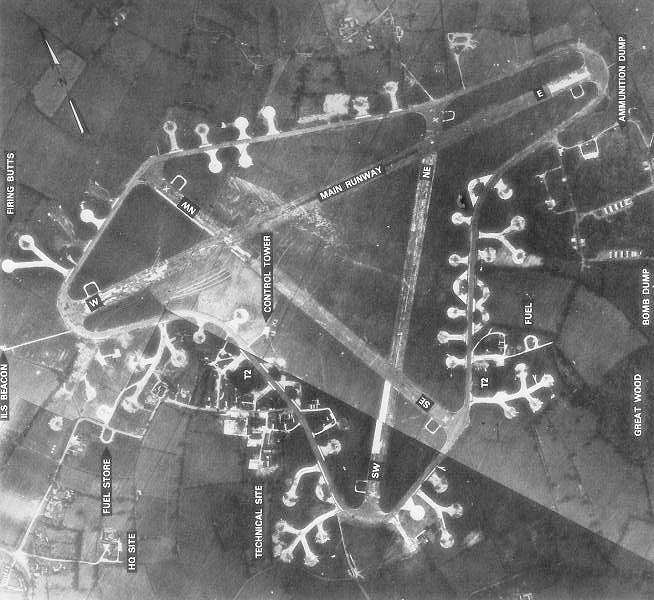
- Framlingham Airfield - 21 June 1946

Site information
- Type: Royal Air Force station
- Code: FM
- Owner: Air Ministry
- Controlled by: Royal Air Force; United States Army Air Forces

Location
- Map showing the location of RAF Framlingham within Suffolk.
- Coordinates: 52°11′53″N 001°24′29″E

Site history
- Built: 1942
- In use: 1943-1945
- Battles/wars: European Theatre of World War II; Air Offensive, Europe July 1942 - May 1945

Garrison information
- Garrison: Eighth Air Force
- Occupants: 390th Bombardment Group

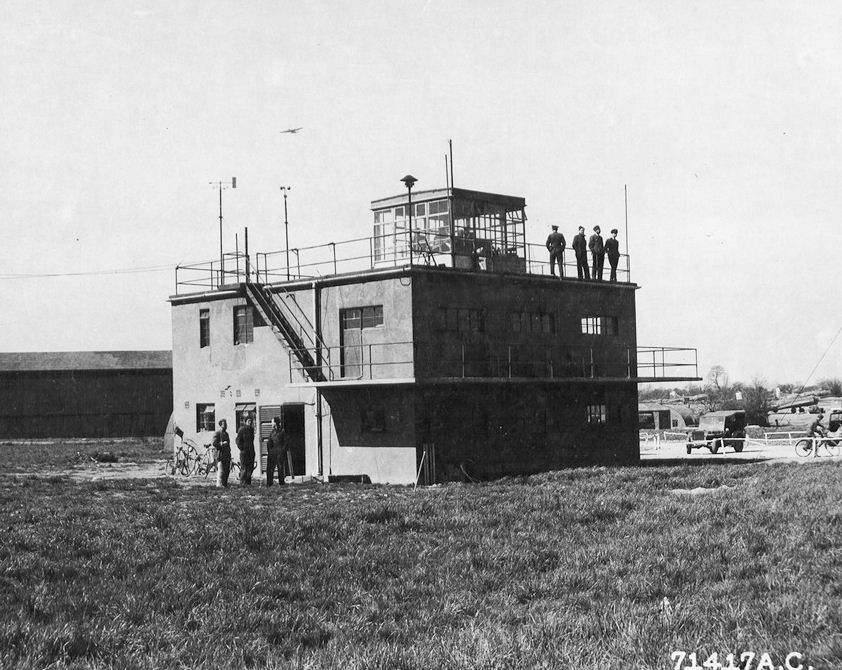
RAF Framlingham Control Tower, 22 May 1944.

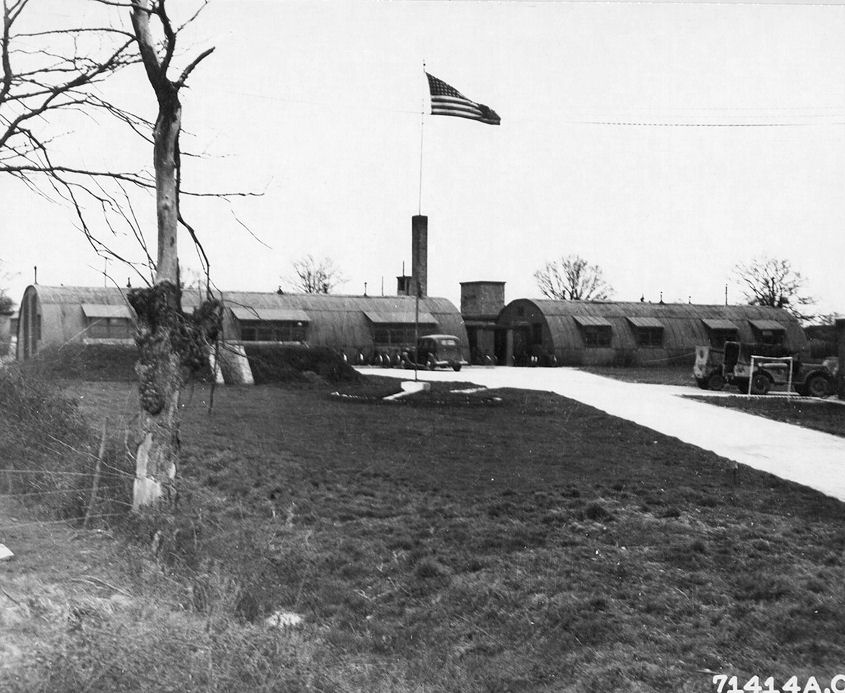
Headquarters buildings, March 1945.

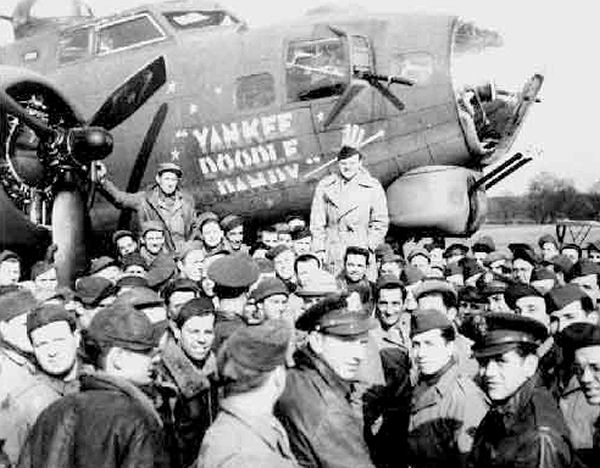
Boeing B-17G Flying Fortress serial 44-83884 "Yankee Doodle Dandy" of the 390th Bomb Group at RAF Framlingham, shown with Hollywood star James Cagney.

Royal Air Force Framlingham or more simply RAF Framlingham is a former United States Army Air Forces WWII airfield located 3 miles (4.8 km) southeast of Framlingham, and 13 miles (21 km) northeast of Ipswich, Suffolk, England.

== History ==
=== United States Army Air Forces use ===
Framlingham airfield was built in 1942 and was used by the United States Army Air Forces Eighth Air Force. It was built as a standard heavy bomber airfield to Class A specification. The three intersecting runways were of 2,030, 1,440 and 1,430 yards length. There was an encircling concrete perimeter track and fifty aircraft hardstands, along with two T-2 hangars, technical sites and Nissen hut accommodations for some 3,000 persons, dispersed in the surrounding countryside.

No part of the airfield fell within the boundary of Framlingham parish, the site being some three miles to the east between the villages of Great Glemham and Parham, with all the technical sites, administrative buildings and living sites around the hamlet of Silverlace Green.

The airfield was opened in 1943 and was given USAAF designation Station 153 (FM).

==== 95th Bombardment Group (Heavy) ====
The 95th Bombardment Group (Heavy) arrived at Framlingham on 12 May 1943 from Rapid City AAF South Dakota. The 95th was assigned to the 35th Combat Bombardment Wing, and the group tail code was a "Square-B". Its operational squadrons were:

- 334th Bombardment Squadron (BG)
- 335th Bombardment Squadron (OE)
- 336th Bombardment Squadron (ET)
- 412th Bombardment Squadron (QW)

The group flew the Boeing B-17 Flying Fortress as part of the Eighth Air Force's strategic bombing campaign and entered combat on 13 May 1943 by attacking an airfield at Saint-Omer. After suffering disastrous losses in its daylight air attacks on the Continent, the 95th was transferred to nearby RAF Horham on 15 June to regroup.

==== 390th Bombardment Group (Heavy) ====
The 390th Bombardment Group (Heavy) arrived at Framlingham on 4 July 1943 from Great Falls Army Air Base Montana. The 390th was assigned to the 13th Combat Bombardment Wing, and the group tail code was a "Square-J". Its operational squadrons were:

- 568th Bombardment Squadron (BI)
- 569th Bombardment Squadron (CC)
- 570th Bombardment Squadron (DI)
- 571st Bombardment Squadron (FC)

The group flew the Boeing B-17 Flying Fortress as part of the Eighth Air Force's strategic bombing campaign and operated chiefly against strategic objectives, flying many missions with the aid of pathfinders. The 390th began combat on 12 August 1943. Five days later, the group attacked the Messerschmitt aircraft complex at Regensburg and received a Distinguished Unit Citation for the mission.

The 390th received a 2d DUC for a mission on 14 October 1943 when the group braved unrelenting assaults by enemy fighters to bomb the antifriction-bearing plants at Schweinfurt. Participating in the intensive Allied assault on the German aircraft industry during Big Week, 20–25 February 1944, the organization bombed aircraft factories, instrument plants and air parks. Other strategic missions included attacks on marshalling yards at Frankfurt, bridges at Cologne, oil facilities at Zeitz, factories at Mannheim, naval installations at Bremen and synthetic oil refineries at Merseburg.

The group sometimes flew interdictory and support missions, including the following:

- Bombing the coast near Caen fifteen minutes before the landings in Normandy on 6 June 1944;
- Attacking enemy artillery in support of ground forces during the breakthrough at Saint-Lô in July;
- Cutting German supply lines during the Battle of the Bulge, December 1944-January 1945;
- Hitting airfields in support of the airborne assault across the Rhine in March 1945.

The 390th Bomb Group flew its last combat mission on 20 April 1945. In over 300 missions, they dropped 19,000 tons of bombs. They lost 181 aircraft and seven hundred and fourteen airmen were killed. The group dropped food supplies to the Dutch during the week prior to V-E Day.

The unit returned to Sioux Falls AAF South Dakota during August and was inactivated on 28 August 1945.

=== Post-war use ===
After the war, Framlingham became a clearing station for the rehabilitation of Polish nationals before being abandoned and closed in late 1948. The land was returned to agriculture and the runways were broken up and ground into aggregate. Buildings were allowed to dilapidate and were used for farm storage. Among them was the Control Tower which was shot up and abandoned after the Americans held a riotous farewell party there in August 1945.

== Current use ==
Today the runways and hardstands of RAF Framlingham airfield have long since been removed for hardcore. The perimeter track has been reduced to one lane farm access roads, but remains fundamentally complete. The technical site is in use as an industrial estate, with many of the World War II Nissen huts in use.

In 1976, a project was undertaken to restore the derelict control tower. The tower was finally dedicated as the 390thBombardment Group Memorial Air Museum on 13 May 1981.

Both the museum and the industrial estate are identified as 'Parham Airfield'.

== See also ==
- List of former Royal Air Force stations
