= Parham Airfield Museum =

Museum in Framlingham, Suffolk, England

Coordinates: 52.1955°N 1.4038°E

Parham Airfield Museum comprises both the 390th Bombardment Group Memorial Air Museum together with the Museum of the British Resistance Organisation, and occupies the Control tower and adjacent buildings on the former RAF Framlingham airfield near the village of Parham, Suffolk, in England.

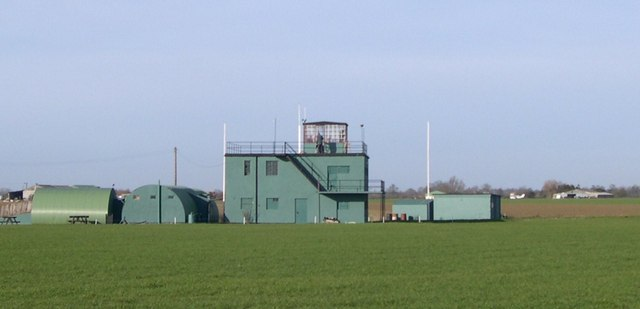
RAF Framlingham Control Tower, the location of Parham Airfield Museum

== 390th Bombardment Group Memorial Air Museum ==
RAF Framlingham was occupied by the USAAF 390th Bombardment Group from 1943 to 1945, and was also identified as USAAF Station AAF-153. After World War II in Europe ended, the runways at RAF Framlingham were broken up and buildings were allowed to deteriorate. In 1976 a five-year restoration programme began to restore the control tower, shot up and abandoned after the Americans held a riotous farewell party there in August 1945. The restored tower was finally dedicated as the 390th Bombardment Group Memorial Air Museum on 13 May 1981. Exhibits focus on the history of the U.S 8th Air Force, the Royal Air Force and the German Luftwaffe in the Second World War. Displays include recovered Second World War aircraft engines, parts of Allied and German aircraft, uniforms, photographs, documents, combat records, paintings and memorabilia.

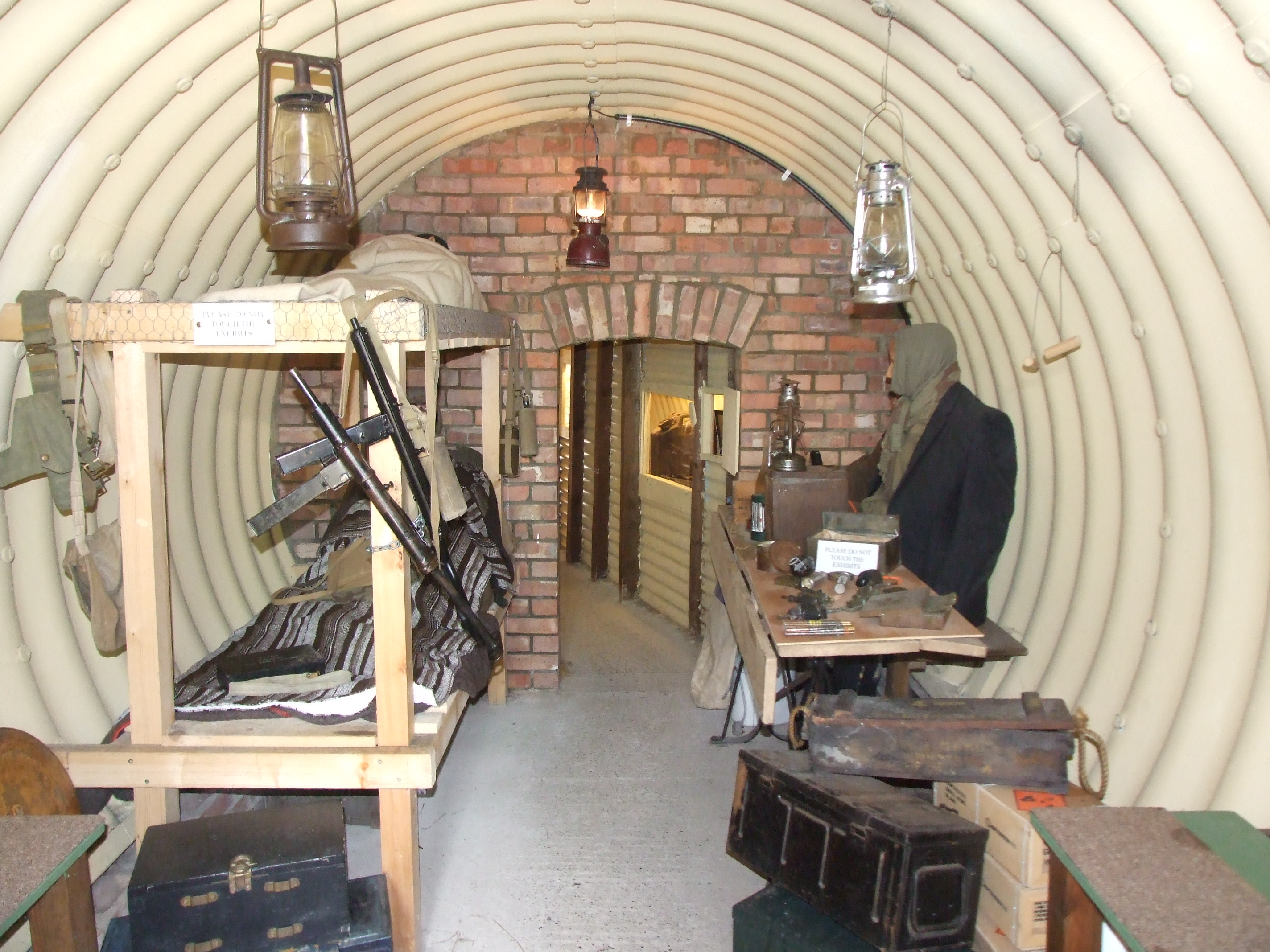
Reconstruction of an Auxiliary Unit Operational Base at the museum.

== Museum of the British Resistance Organisation ==
The Museum of the British Resistance Organisation was created in 1997, with the opening ceremony being carried out by Lieutenant Colonel J.W. Stuart Edmundsun, TD, RE, one of the founders of the nondescript 'Most Secret' GHQ. The museum is located in a Quonset hut adjacent to the control tower, and is dedicated to the Auxiliary Units, one of Britain's nine secret services of World War II, alongside better known clandestine organisations such as the Security Service (MI5), the Secret Intelligence Service (MI6), and the Special Operations Executive.

In case the Germans succeeded in invading Britain, the men and women of the Auxiliary Units were trained to operate as the British underground resistance. They were to remain undetected in carefully constructed bunkers (Operating Bases – OBs) as the invading German Army made its way through Britain.

The museum includes a replica underground Operational Base, as well as photographs, special weapons such as time pencil fuses and other explosives, dead letter boxes, agent instruction papers, and information about the special radio communications network installed by the Royal Corps of Signals.

== Sources ==
- Parham – Bottesford DC
