= 570th Strategic Missile Squadron =

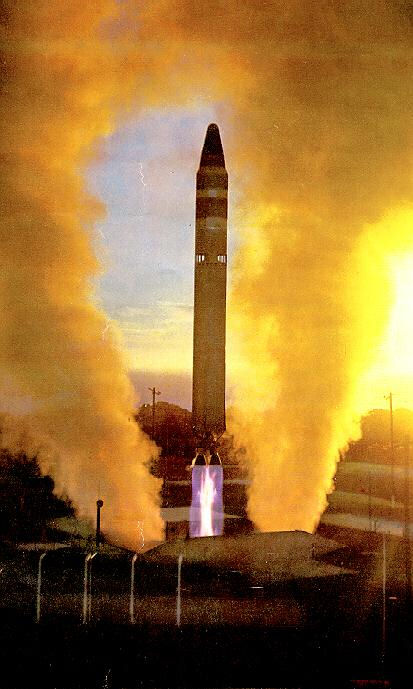
- LGM-25C Titan II Test Launch at Vandenberg AFB, California
- Active: 1942–1945; 1947–1949; 1962–1984
- Country: United States
- Branch: United States Air Force
- Type: Squadron
- Role: Intercontinental ballistic missile
- Engagements: European Theater of Operations
- Decorations: Distinguished Unit Citation; Air Force Outstanding Unit Award

Insignia
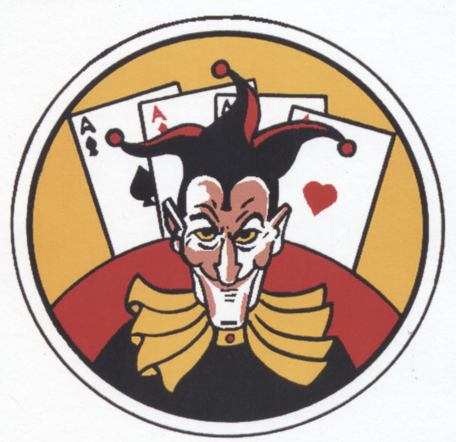
- 570th Strategic Missile Squadron emblem (Note: Approved 10 May 1943.Description: On a disc per fess debased arched, orange and red, within a border black, piped white, four playing cards (aces) arranged spades, diamonds, clubs, and hearts, reading from dexter to sinister, issuing from arched segment in base, all behind a knave with evil facial expression, wearing black suit, orange collar, black hat of three points, trimmed and balled in each point of red.)
- World War II fuselage identification code: DI

The 570th Strategic Missile Squadron is an inactive United States Air Force unit. It was last assigned to the 390th Strategic Missile Wing at Davis-Monthan Air Force Base, Arizona. It was equipped with the LGM-25C Titan II intercontinental ballistic missile, with a mission of nuclear deterrence. The squadron was inactivated as part of the phaseout of the Titan II on 31 July 1984.

The squadron was first activated during World War II as the 570th Bombardment Squadron. After training in the United States, it deployed to the European Theater of Operations, where it participated in the strategic bombing campaign against Germany. It was twice awarded the Distinguished Unit Citation for its actions in combat. After V-E Day, the squadron returned to the United States, where it was inactivated in August 1945. The squadron was active in the reserve from 1947 until 1949, but does not appear to have been fully manned or equipped at this time.

== History ==
=== World War II ===
==== Activation and training in the United States ====
The squadron was first activated at Geiger Field, Washington in January 1943 as the 570th Bombardment Squadron, one of the four original squadrons of the 390th Bombardment Group. A cadre from the squadron and group went to the Army Air Force School of Applied Tactics at Orlando Army Air Base, Florida for advanced training. The 390th Group was the first to go through this training process, which was followed by later combat groups. The squadron was filled out with Boeing B-17 Flying Fortress heavy bombers beginning the following month and trained at Geiger and at Great Falls Army Air Base, Montana until early July 1943. The squadron's air echelon ferried their B-17s to England via the north Atlantic ferry route, with the first bombers arriving on 13 July. The ground echelon departed for Camp Shanks and the New York Port of Embarkation, sailing on the USAT James Parker on 17 July, reaching England ten days later.

==== Combat in the European Theater ====
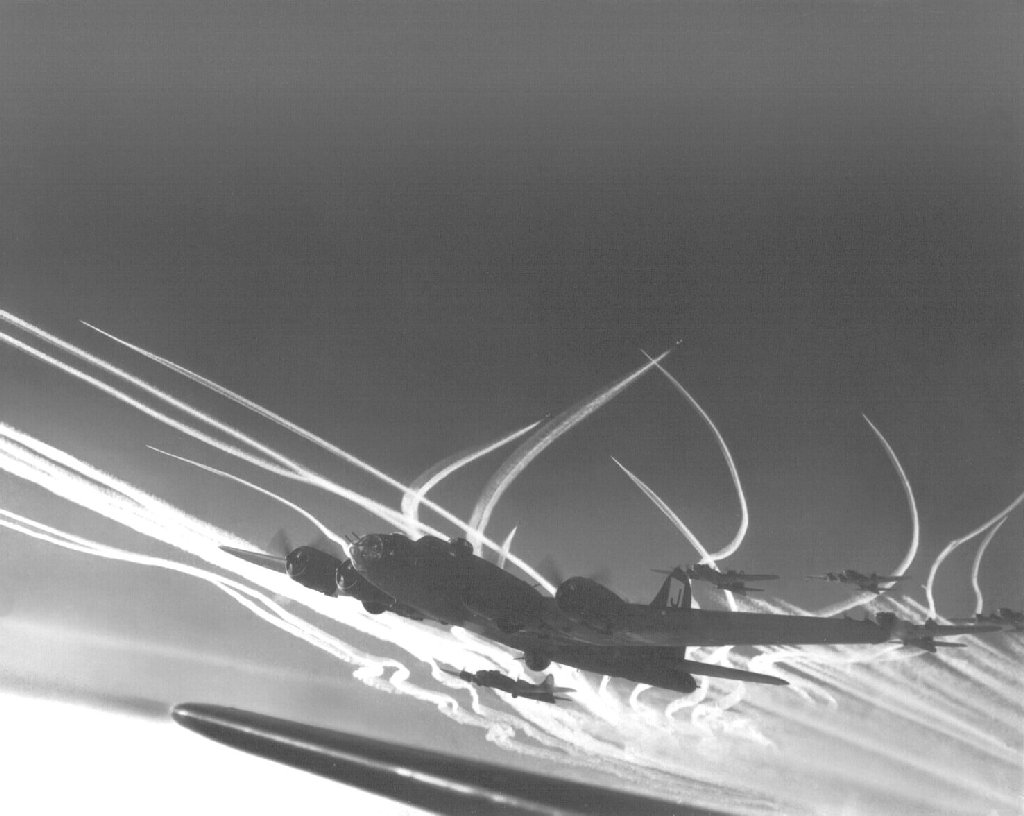
Fighter contrails over a formation of 390th Group B-17s

The squadron arrived at its combat station, RAF Framlingham in July 1943 and flew its first combat mission on 12 August against targets in the Ruhr. Five days later, the squadron attacked the Messerschmitt factory at Regensburg, for which it earned its first Distinguished Unit Citation (DUC). The Regensburg mission was a "shuttle" mission, and the squadron continued after striking the target to recover at Twelfth Air Force bases in North Africa. Poor weather at the departure bases extended the time required to assemble the strike force, making fuel reserves critical. Half of the fighter cover missed the rendezvous, lessening the bombers' protection. For an hour and a half after its entry into German airspace, the strike force bore attacks from German interceptors. The 390th Group suffered the heaviest losses of the leading wing, but had the best bombing results, which destroyed equipment used for the assembly of the Me 262 jet fighter, delaying its introduction into service.

On 14 October 1943, the squadron carried out an attack on the ball bearing factories at Schweinfurt, braving unrelenting attacks by enemy fighters, despite which, the 390th Group had the highest accuracy of the attacking force. For this mission it received a second DUC. In late February 1944, the squadron participated in Big Week, the concentrated assault on Germany's aircraft manufacturing industry, including plants manufacturing aircraft instruments and depots for aviation supplies. Other strategic targets included attacks on navy bases at Bremen, bridges at Cologne, marshalling yards at Frankfurt am Main, factories at Mannheim, synthetic oil plants at Merseburg, and oil refineries at Zeitz.

The squadron was occasionally diverted from the strategic bombing campaign to fly air support and interdiction missions. It bombed near Caen fifteen minutes before the first landings on the Normandy coast on D Day. It provided support during Operation Cobra, the breakout at Saint Lo in late July 1944. During the Battle of the Bulge from December 1944 through January 1945, it cut German supply lines to the battle area. It attacked Axis air bases to support Operation Varsity, the airborne assault across the Rhine, in March 1945. The squadron flew its last combat mission on 20 April 1945.

==== Return to the United States and inactivation ====
Just prior to and after V-E Day, the squadron dropped food supplies to civilians in the Netherlands. The squadron's aircraft began returning to the United States on 25 June 1945, while the ground echelon sailed on the RMS Queen Elizabeth in early August. The squadron reassembled at Sioux Falls Army Air Field, South Dakota later that month and was inactivated there on 28 August 1945.

=== Reserve operations ===
The squadron was activated in the reserve at Sioux City Army Air Base, Iowa, where it trained under the supervision of Air Defense Command (ADC)'s 140th AAF Base Unit (Reserve Training) (later the 2470th Air Force Reserve Training Center). It is not clear to what degree the squadron was staffed or equipped while a reserve unit. In 1948 Continental Air Command (ConAC) assumed responsibility for managing reserve and Air National Guard units from ADC. President Truman’s reduced 1949 defense budget required reductions in the number of units in the Air Force, The 570th was inactivated in June 1949 as reserve flying operations at Sioux City came to an end.

=== Intercontinental ballistic missiles ===
The squadron was redesignated the 570th Strategic Missile Squadron and organized at Davis-Monthan Air Force Base, Arizona as a Strategic Air Command (SAC) LGM-25C Titan II intercontinental ballistic missile squadron on 1 January 1962. It was the first Titan II squadron to be organized. Although it drew some cadre from the 303d Bombardment Wing, the squadron was mostly formed from ground up. The squadron was initially concerned with training and duties associated with facility construction, for the first Titan did not arrive until November, and the first Titan II complex, Site 570-2, was not accepted by SAC until March 1963. The site went on alert status on 4 April 1963 and was the first Titan II site to become operational. The squadron became operational on 15 June 1963, the first Titan II squadron to do so. (Note: Per Ravenstein. Ravenstein, p. 212. The SAC Missile Chronology gives 15 June as the operational date. SAC Missile Chrononology, p. 40.)

The Titan II was an improvement over the Titan I. It used storeable liquid propellant and all inertial guidance. It could be launched from its silo and carried a larger warhead. The squadron operated nine missile sites:

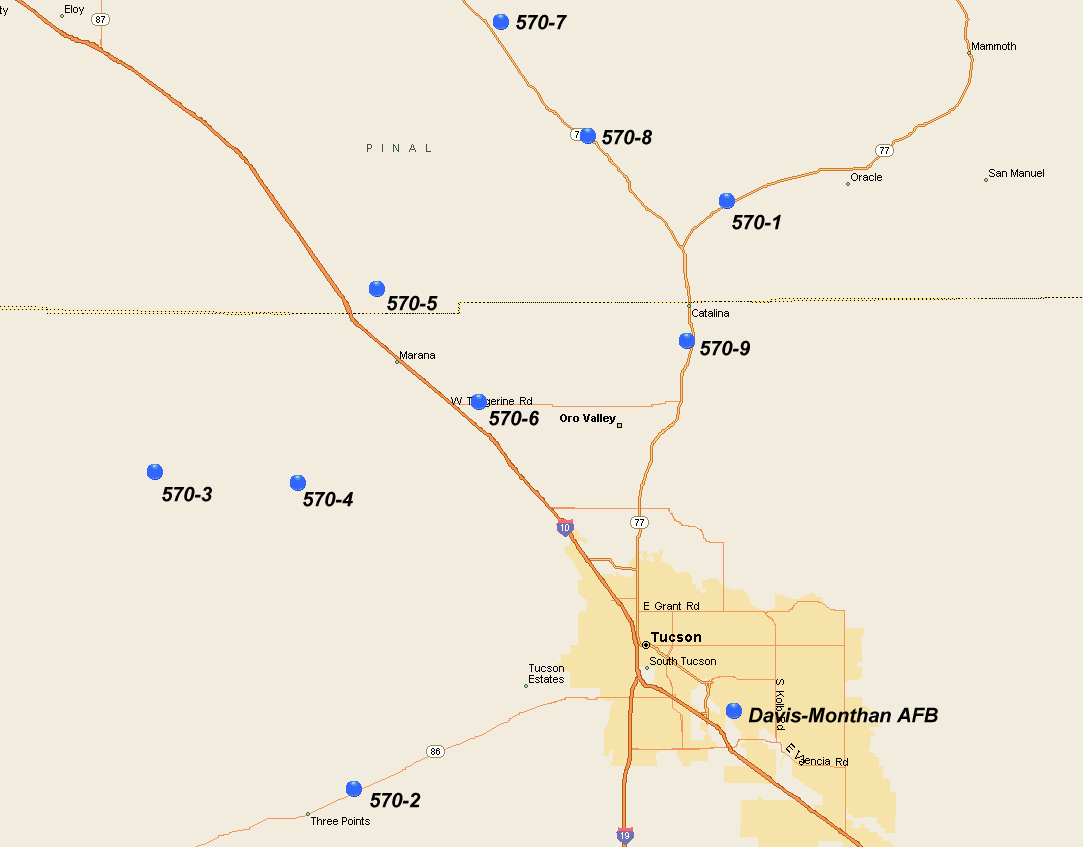
LGM-25C Titan II Sites

570-1 (8 Jun 1963 – 12 May 1983), 7.0 mi W of Oracle, AZ 32°35′50″N 110°53′20″W
570-2 (21 Mar 1963 – 4 Apr 1983), 3.4 mi ENE of Three Points, AZ 32°06′03″N 111°15′44″W
570-3 (22 May 1963 – 27 Mar 1984), 14.7 mi WSW of Marana, AZ 32°22′04″N 111°27′43″W
570-4 (1 Jun 1963 – 7 May 1984), 7.6 mi SW of Marana, AZ 32°21′33″N 111°19′05″W
570-5 (3 May 1963 – 21 May 1984), 6.1 mi N of Marana, AZ 32°31′23″N 111°14′21″W
570-6 (22 Apr 1963 – 27 Feb 1984), 5.1 mi E of Marana, AZ 32°25′40″N 111°08′15″W
570-7 (24 May 1963 – 3 Jan 1983), 17.1 mi NW of Oracle Junction, AZ 32°44′55″N 111°06′57″W
570-8 (25 Jun 1963 – 27 Jun 1983), 8.8 mi NW of Oracle Junction, AZ 32°39′08″N 111°01′43″W
570-9 (14 Jun 1963 – 2 Jul 1982), 5.3 mi S of Oracle Junction, AZ 32°28′43″N 110°55′44″W

In November 1964, the squadron and the 390th Wing became the first Titan II unit in SAC to complete an operational readiness inspection.

On 2 October 1981, Deputy Secretary of Defense Frank Carlucci directed the inactivation of the Titan II as soon as possible. On 2 July 1982 the missile at Site 570-9 was removed to be used for testing. This was the first Titan II site to be inactivated. Project Rivet Cap, the termination of the Titan II weapons system, formally began with the removal of a Titan II in September. In November 1983, explosive demolition of squadron Titan II silos began. The squadron's last launch complex (570-5) was removed from alert on 21 May 1984 and the squadron was inactivated on 31 July 1984.

In 2019 site 570-8 was put for private sale. It's described as a "bold opportunity to own a decommissioned underground Titan II missile complex."

== Lineage ==
- Constituted as the 570th Bombardment Squadron (Heavy) on 15 January 1943

Activated on 26 January 1943
Redesignated 570th Bombardment Squadron, Heavy c. 20 August 1943
Inactivated on 28 August 1945

- Redesignated 570th Bombardment Squadron, Very Heavy on 12 September 1947

Activated in the reserve on 6 October 1947
Inactivated on 27 June 1949

- Redesignated 570th Strategic Missile Squadron (ICBM-Titan) and activated, on 16 August 1961 (not organized)

Organized on 1 January 1962
Inactivated on 31 July 1984

=== Assignments ===
- 390th Bombardment Group, 26 January 1943 – 28 August 1945
- Second Air Force, 6 October 1947
- Tenth Air Force, 1 July 1948 – 27 June 1949
- Strategic Air Command, 28 January 1961 (not organized)
- 390th Strategic Missile Wing, 1 January 1962 – 31 July 1984

=== Stations ===
- Geiger Field, Washington, 26 January 1943
- Great Falls Army Air Base, Montana, 6 June-4 July 1943
- RAF Framlingham (AAF-153), England, 26 July 1943 – 6 August 1945
- Sioux Falls Army Air Field, South Dakota, 14–28 August 1945
- Sioux City Army Air Base, Iowa, 6 October 1947 – 27 June 1949
- Davis-Monthan Air Force Base, Arizona, 1 January 1962 – 31 July 1984

=== Aircraft and missiles ===
- B-17 Flying Fortress, 1943–1945
- LGM-25C Titan II Missile, 1962–1984

=== Awards and campaigns ===
Award streamer	Award	Dates	Notes
	Distinguished Unit Citation	17 August 1943	Germany 570th Bombardment Squadron
	Distinguished Unit Citation	14 October 1943	Germany 570th Bombardment Squadron
	Air Force Outstanding Unit Award	1 July 1969 – 30 June 1970	570th Strategic Missile Squadron
	Air Force Outstanding Unit Award	1 July 1976 – 30 June 1977	570th Strategic Missile Squadron
	Air Force Outstanding Unit Award	1 July 1977 – 30 June 1979	570th Strategic Missile Squadron
	Air Force Outstanding Unit Award	1 July 1982 – 30 June 1984	570th Strategic Missile Squadron

Campaign Streamer	Campaign	Dates	Notes
	Air Offensive, Europe	26 July 1943 – 5 June 1944	570th Bombardment Squadron
	Air Combat, EAME Theater	26 July 1943 – 11 May 1945	570th Bombardment Squadron
	Normandy	6 June 1944 – 24 July 1944	570th Bombardment Squadron
	Northern France	25 July 1944 – 14 September 1944	570th Bombardment Squadron
	Rhineland	15 September 1944 – 21 March 1945	570th Bombardment Squadron
	Ardennes-Alsace	16 December 1944 – 25 January 1945	570th Bombardment Squadron
	Central Europe	22 March 1944 – 21 May 1945	570th Bombardment Squadron

== See also ==
- List of United States Air Force missile squadrons
- B-17 Flying Fortress units of the United States Army Air Forces
