= United States Air Force Missile Combat Competition =

The United States Air Force's Missile Combat Competition is a military competition that recognizes the intercontinental ballistic missile combat crews in the force.

== History ==
=== Curtain raiser ===
The first missile combat competition, named CURTAIN RAISER, ran from 3–7 April 1967.

United States' Strategic Air Command began the event to allow differing intercontinental ballistic missile units to compete for the title of "Best ICBM Wing".

=== Olympic arena ===
While the second competition in 1968 was canceled, due to SAC commitments in Southeast Asia, the third competition was held on 19–23 May 1969. The competition was also redesignated OLYMPIC ARENA.

=== Guardian Challenge ===
After the demise of the Cold War, the event was renamed Guardian Challenge and began to include space operations units, as well as ICBM organizations.

=== Global Strike Challenge ===
After the transfer of Intercontinental Ballistic Missiles (ICBM) from Air Force Space Command to Air Force Global Strike Command on 1 December 2009, Missile Combat Competition has been rolled up under a competition which will be known as Global Strike Challenge. Global Strike Challenge is Air Force Global Strike Command's competition for Air Force ICBM and Bomber Forces. The first Global Strike Challenge took place at Barksdale AFB LA in November 2010.

== Blanchard Trophy ==
Blanchard Trophy Winners
Year	Unit	Base	Weapon System
1967	351st Strategic Missile Wing	Whiteman AFB	Minuteman II
1968	NO COMPETITION HELD		
1969	321st Strategic Missile Wing	Grand Forks AFB	Minuteman II
1970	44th Strategic Missile Wing	Ellsworth AFB	Minuteman II
1971	351st Strategic Missile Wing	Whiteman AFB	Minuteman II
1972	381st Strategic Missile Wing	McConnell AFB	Titan II
1973	90th Strategic Missile Wing	F.E. Warren AFB	Minuteman II/III
1974	321st Strategic Missile Wing	Grand Forks AFB	Minuteman II
1975	381st Strategic Missile Wing	McConnell AFB	Titan II
1976	341st Strategic Missile Wing	Malmstrom AFB	Minuteman II/III
1977	351st Strategic Missile Wing	Whiteman AFB	Minuteman II
1978	91st Strategic Missile Wing	Minot AFB	Minuteman III
1979	390th Strategic Missile Wing	Davis-Monthan AFB	Titan II
1980	381st Strategic Missile Wing	McConnell AFB	Titan II
1981	351st Strategic Missile Wing	Whiteman AFB	Minuteman II
1982	44th Strategic Missile Wing	Ellsworth AFB	Minuteman II
1983	381st Strategic Missile Wing	McConnell AFB	Titan II
1984	90th Strategic Missile Wing	F.E. Warren AFB	Minuteman II/III
1985	308th Strategic Missile Wing	Little Rock AFB	Titan II
1986	341st Strategic Missile Wing	Malmstrom AFB	Minuteman III
1987	321st Strategic Missile Wing	Grand Forks AFB	Minuteman II
1988	91st Strategic Missile Wing	Minot AFB	Minuteman III
1989	351st Strategic Missile Wing	Whiteman AFB	Minuteman II
1990	341st Strategic Missile Wing		Minuteman II/III
1991	341st Strategic Missile Wing		Minuteman III
1992	44th Missile Wing	Ellsworth AFB	Minuteman II
1993	351st Missile Wing	Whiteman AFB	Minuteman II
1994	91st Missile Group		Minuteman III
1995	341st Strategic Missile Wing		Minuteman III
1996	319th Missile Squadron|	F.E. Warren AFB	
1997	320th Missile Squadron	F.E. Warren AFB	Minuteman III/Peacekeeper
1998	341st Strategic Missile Wing		Minuteman III
1999	91st Space Wing	Minot AFB	Minuteman III
2000			Minuteman III
2001	91st Space Wing	Minot AFB	Minuteman III
2002	341st Strategic Missile Wing		Minuteman III
2003	NO COMPETITION HELD		
2004	91st Space Wing	Minot AFB	Minuteman III
2005			Minuteman III
2006	341st Space Wing	Malmstrom AFB	Minuteman III
2007			Minuteman III
2008	341st Missile Wing	Malmstrom AFB	Minuteman III
2009			Minuteman III
2010	90th Missile Wing	F.E. Warren AFB	
2011	90th Missile Wing	F.E. Warren AFB	
2012	91st Missile Wing		

== See also ==
- Guardian Challenge
- LGM-30 Minuteman
- LGM-25C Titan II
