= 390th Strategic Missile Wing =

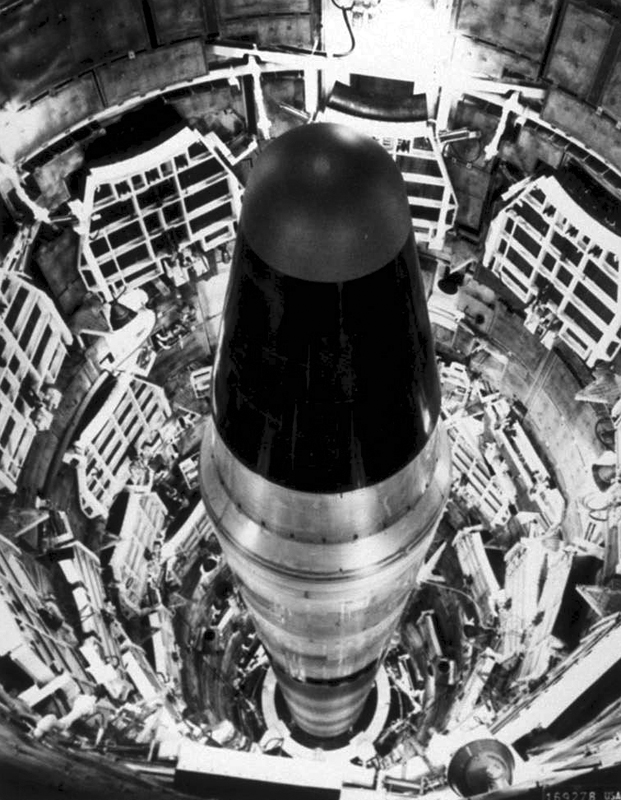
- Titan II missile in its silo
- Active: 1943–1945; 1962–1984
- Country: United States
- Branch: United States Air Force
- Role: Long range missile
- Mottos: Sur le Nez (French for 'On the Nose') (WW II); Non Nobis Solum (Latin for 'Not for Ourselves Alone') (SAC)
- Mascot: Honey bear (WW II)
- Engagements: European Theater of Operations
- Decorations: Distinguished Unit Citation; Air Force Outstanding Unit Award

Insignia
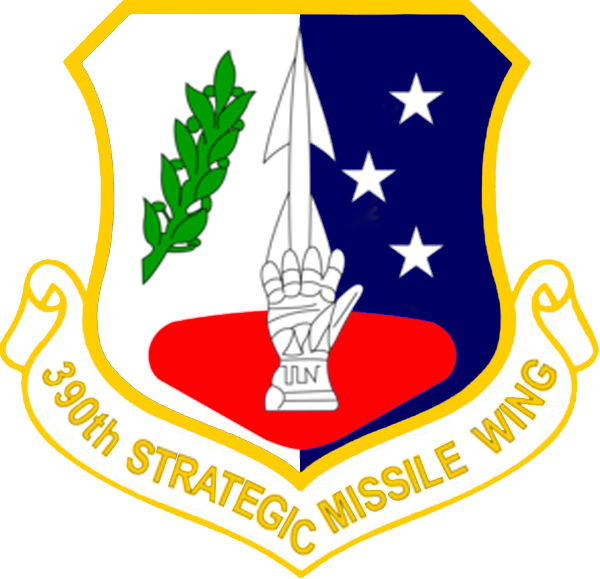
- 390th Strategic Missile Wing emblem (Note: Approved 2 March 1964.)

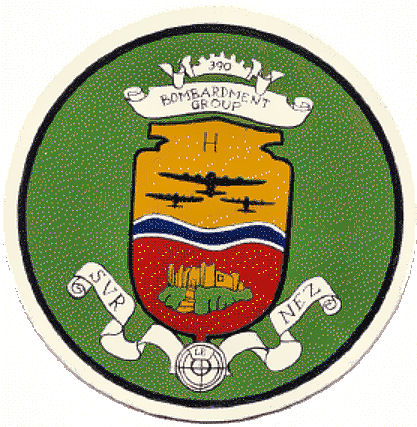
- Unofficial 390th Bombardment Group emblem
- World War II Tail Marking: Square J

The 390th Strategic Missile Wing was an intercontinental ballistic missile organization of the United States Air Force. Part of Strategic Air Command, it was stationed at Davis–Monthan Air Force Base, Arizona.

The wing was first organized as the 390th Bombardment Group in January 1943 and equipped with the Boeing B-17 Flying Fortress. After training in the United States, the group moved to England, beginning combat operations in August. The group flew 300 combat missions and was twice awarded the Distinguished Unit Citation for its action in combat. Its last mission was on 20 April 1945. After V-E Day, the group returned to the United States, where it was inactivated in August 1945.

The 390th Strategic Missile Wing was organized in January 1962 as the United States Air Force's first LGM-25C Titan II wing, becoming operational in March 1963. It earned honors as the best Titan II wing in Strategic Air Command (SAC) on five occasions, and in 1979 earned the Blanchard Trophy as SAC's best missile wing of any kind. It was inactivated in 1984 with the retirement of the Titan II from the United States intercontinental ballistic missile inventory. Just before the wing was inactivated, the Air Force consolidated the group and the wing into a single unit.

== History ==
=== World War II ===
==== Training in the United States ====
The unit was first activated on 26 January 1943 at Geiger Field Washington as the 390th Bombardment Group, with the 568th 569th 570th and 571st Bombardment Squadrons assigned as its original squadrons. The group did not begin to fill its ranks until early the following month.

The group trained at Geiger until June 1943 when it moved to Great Falls Army Air Base, Montana. Senior officers of the group were the first from bombardment groups to be assigned to Eighth Air Force to attend the Army Air Forces School of Applied Tactics at Orlando Army Air Base, Florida, where comprehensive training, based on the Army Air Forces' combat experience, was conducted. The 390th's Boeing B-17 Flying Fortresses began their flights overseas on 4 July, taking the northern ferry route from Iceland to Prestwick Airport, Scotland, where the first aircraft arrived on 13 July 1943. The ground echelon left for Camp Shanks, New York the same day and sailed on the SS James Parker on 17 July 1943, and arrived at Liverpool on 27 July. The group was reunited at its permanent station, RAF Framlingham, a few days later.

==== Combat in Europe ====
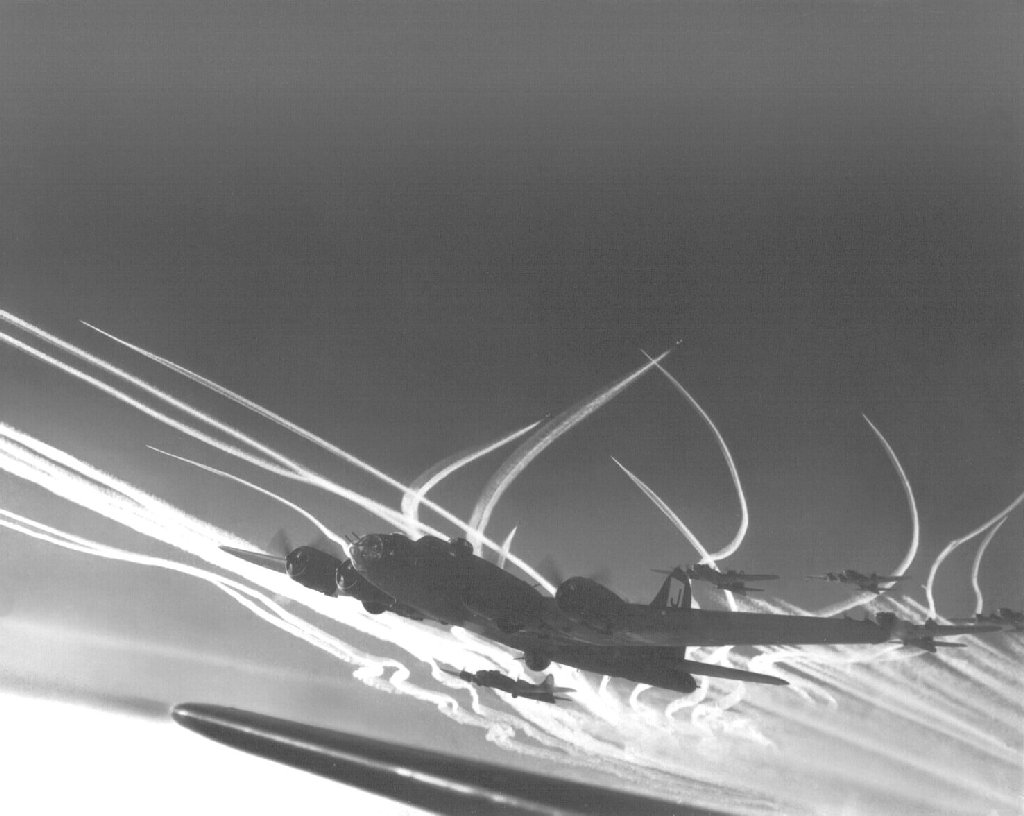
390th Bombardment Group over Germany

The group was the last of the "second wind" heavy bombardment groups that reinforced VIII Bomber Command in the summer of 1943 to arrive in England. It operated chiefly against strategic objectives. The 390th began combat on 12 August 1943. Only five days later, on 17 August, the group attacked the Messerschmitt aircraft complex at Regensburg, achieving the highest accuracy of any of the groups sent against the target. Near the target area, the group was attacked by twin engine German fighters and suffered the heaviest losses of the three groups in the lead wing. This was a shuttle mission, with the bombers recovering at Twelfth Air Force bases in North Africa, although a group aircraft was one of the first two American planes to make emergency landings in neutral Switzerland. (Note: A B-17 of the 100th Bombardment Group landed in Switzerland on the same mission. Freeman, p. 68.) The group received a Distinguished Unit Citation for the mission. The 390th was awarded a second Distinguished Unit Citation for a mission on 14 October 1943 when it braved assaults by enemy fighters to bomb the ball bearing plants at Schweinfurt. Once again, the group had the most accurate bombing results of the units attacking the target. Allied intelligence estimated that following the attack German ball bearing production was reduced by 50% and that it was six months before production was restored to its level before the attack. The group participated in the intensive Allied attacks on the German aircraft industry during Big Week, from 20 to 25 February 1944, when it bombed aircraft factories, instrument plants and aircraft depots. Other strategic missions included attacks on marshalling yards at Frankfurt, bridges at Cologne, petroleum facilities at Zeitz, factories at Mannheim, naval installations at Bremen and synthetic oil refineries at Merseburg.

In January 1944 Sergeant Hewitt ‘Buck’ Dunn joined the 390th, who was a gunner and bombardier. He went on to become the only man in the Eighth Air Force to fly over 100 combat missions and one of the most decorated Enlisted men in the U.S. Air Force. He died in 1961 at the age of 41 and is buried at Arlington National Cemetery.

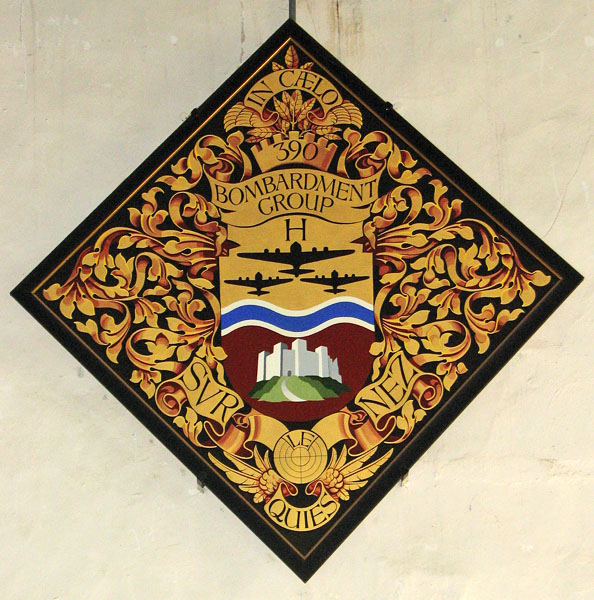
Hatchment commemorating the 390th inside the Church of St Michael the Archangel, Framlingham, Suffolk, England. The 390th was stationed at the Parham Airfield in nearby Parham.

The group was sometimes diverted from the strategic mission to fly interdiction and ground support missions. On 25 May 1944, a detachment of the group was directed to bomb coastal defenses in France using radar, despite weather conditions that were ideal for visual bombing. Although crewmembers were not advised why radar bombing was directed, this mission was a test to determine if pathfinder operations would succeed if the weather over Normandy was foul when the invasion took place. Thereafter, the group would frequently use pathfinder techniques when clouds obscured its assigned targets. The group bombed the coast near Caen fifteen minutes before the D-Day landings in Normandy on 6 June 1944. It attacked enemy artillery in support of ground forces during Operation Cobra, the breakout at Saint-Lô in late July 1944.

In August 1944, the group attacked a Focke-Wulf aircraft factory at Rumia (Rahmel), Poland, landing at Mirgorod in Ukraine. After flying a mission against a synthetic oil production facility at Trzebinia, Poland, (returning to Mirgorod), the group attacked airfields in Romania, landing in Italy. On its return to Feltwell, the group attacked a French airfield, suffering no losses to the three-legged mission. The 390th cut German supply lines during the Battle of the Bulge between December 1944 and January 1945. On 14 January 1945, during an attack on targets near Berlin, a low squadron of the group's aircraft were separated from the main attacking formation because of supercharger problems with the lead aircraft, making them easy targets for German fighters, which shot down all eight Flying Fortresses in the formation. This was the highest loss the 390th suffered on a single mission during the war.

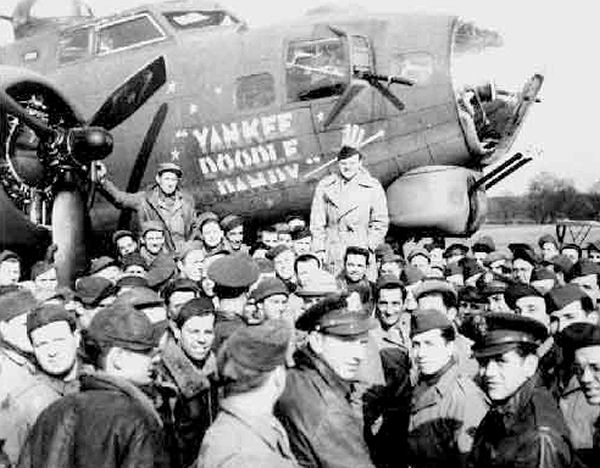
390th's "Yankee Doodle Dandy" with James Cagney (Note: Aircraft is Douglas Long Beach B-17G-95-DL Flying Fortress serial 44-83884. An aircraft painted to represent 44-83884 is now on static display at Eighth Air Force Headquarters, Barksdale Air Force Base, Louisiana.)

The group attacked airfields of the Luftwaffe to support Operation Varsity, the airborne assault across the Rhine, in March 1945. On 5 April 1945, Master Sergeant Hewitt Dunn became the only person to fly 100 combat missions with Eighth Air Force. The 390th Bombardment Group flew its last combat mission on 20 April 1945. In over 300 missions, they dropped more than 19,000 tons of bombs. They lost 176 aircraft and 714 airmen were killed in action. The unit claimed the destruction of 342 enemy aircraft. The group dropped food supplies to the Dutch during the week prior to V-E Day.

The 390th redeployed to the States between June and August 1945. The unit's aircraft left from RAF Framlingham on 25 and 26 June 1945. the ground echelon sailed from Greenock on the RMS Queen Elizabeth on 5 August 1945 and arrived in New York on 11 August, and its members were granted leave. The group moved at minimum strength to Sioux Falls Army Air Field, South Dakota on 12 August and was inactivated there on 28 August 1945.

=== Cold War ===
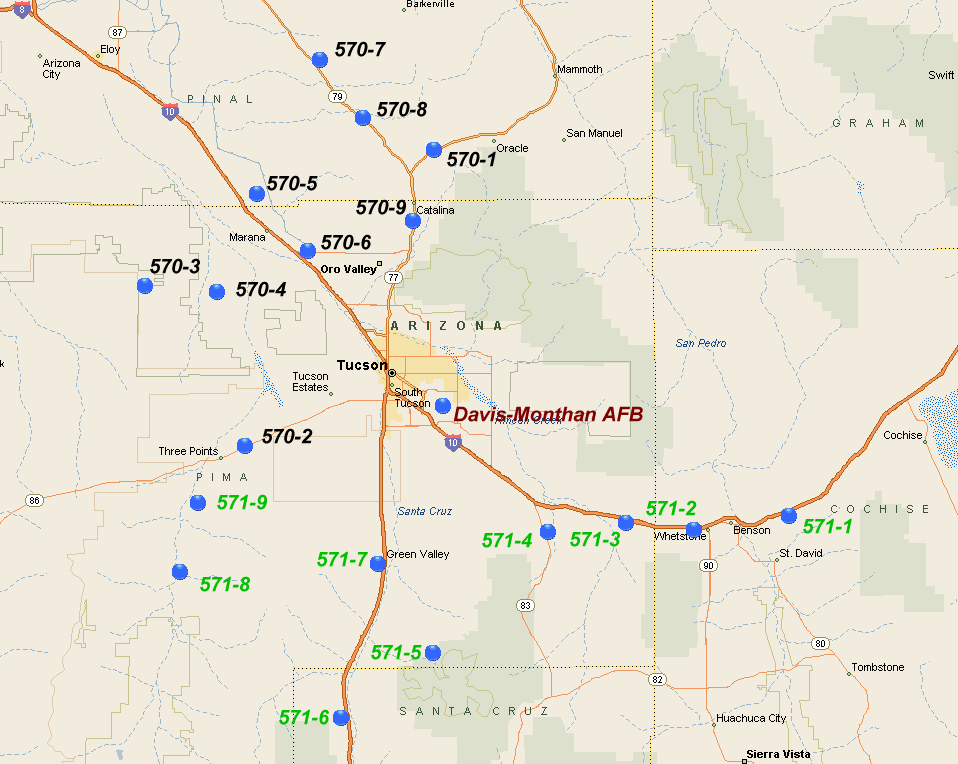
Titan II Missile Sites

In April 1960, the United States Air Force announced selection of the Davis–Monthan Air Force Base, Arizona to support an LGM-25C Titan II missile wing. The 1 January 1962 organization of the 390th Strategic Missile Wing marked the first stand up of a Titan II wing. Although the wing was built up from scratch some of its initial cadre came from the 303d Bombardment Wing, a Strategic Air Command (SAC) Boeing B-47 Stratojet wing, also stationed at Davis–Monthan. The wing's initial task was to supervise the construction of launch silos and command and control facilities for its Titans.

Its two component squadrons were the 570th and the 571st Strategic Missile Squadrons. (Note: The 390th's other two World War II squadrons, the 568th and 569th, had already been activated as Titan I squadrons at Mountain Home Air Force Base and Larson Air Force Base and assigned to the strategic wings at those bases. Maurer, Combat Units, pp. 665–66.) Launcher locations for the 570th Squadron were at Oracle, Three Points, Rillito (4 silos), and Oracle Junction, Arizona (3 silos). The 571st's silos were located at Benson (2 silos), Mescal, Pantano, Continental (2 silos), Palo Alto, and Three Points, Arizona. On 31 March 1963, the contractor turned site 570-2 (Note: Sites were numbered sequentially by the squadron that operated them.) over to SAC for operational use.

Its first missile did not arrive at Davis–Monthan until 27 November 1962 and was installed in its silo twelve days later, although it would be 31 March 1963 before the wing would accept its first Titan II complex. The 570th Squadron became operational on 13 June and the 571st on 30 November, when the 18th and final wing Titan II went on alert. The 390th became the first operational Titan II wing in the Air Force the following day. (Note: In evaluating "firsts" or annual "bests" garnered by the wing, it should be kept in mind that there were only two other Titan II wings in the Air Force, the 308th Strategic Missile Wing and the 381st Strategic Missile Wing. Ravenstein, pp. 156–58, 206–07.)

With a requirement to keep all 18 wing missiles on alert status, maintenance personnel initially worked extremely long hours, particularly until the end of 1964, when the Davis–Monthan launch sites became the first Titan II sites to install dehumidifier equipment that eased corrosion problems within the silos under Project Green Jug. Additional modifications increased missile reliability, survivability, and reaction time. By the end of 1964, the 390th underwent the first operational readiness inspection for a Titan II unit. On 25 March 1965, the 390th performed the first operational launch test of one of its Titan IIs at Vandenberg Air Force Base, California in Operation Arctic Sun. More tests followed.

Competing in SAC's first missile competition, Project Curtain Raiser, in 1967, the 390th won the first "best crew" trophy. The wing was named the best Titan II wing in the Air Force at these competitions, which became known as "Olympic Arena." in 1969, 1970, 1974 and 1977. These awards were capped in 1979, when the wing was awarded the Blanchard Trophy as the best missile wing in SAC. (Note: The trophy is named in honor of General William H. Blanchard. Tryon, SSG Mike (24 November 2010). "Warren Wranglers bring Blanchard Trophy home to Mighty Ninety". 90th Missile Wing Public Affairs..)

In October 1981, President Ronald Reagan announced that as part of the modernization of strategic missiles the Titan II was to be retired by 1 October 1987. Site deactivation began at Davis–Monthan on 1 October 1982. During the operation, titled Rivet Cap, missiles were removed and shipped to Norton Air Force Base, California, where they were refurbished and stored. Demolition began at missile complex 570-7 on 30 November 1983. In January 1984, the Air Force consolidated the 390th Group and the 390th Wing into a single unit. In May the last Titan II at Davis–Monthan came off alert status, and at the end of July the Air Force inactivated the 390th Strategic Missile Wing.

== Lineage ==
390th Bombardment Group

- Constituted as the 390th Bombardment Group (Heavy) on 15 January 1943

Activated on 26 January 1943 (Note: Wilson claims the group was activated 23 February 1943 at Blythe Army Air Base, California and transferred to Orlando Army Air Base, Florida the next day. Wilson, p. 95. This is contradicted by both Maurer, Combat Units, p. 278 and Freeman, p. 255. The 26 January date is corroborated by Maurer, Combat Units pp. 665–667, giving the activation date of the group's component squadrons.)

- Redesignated 390th Bombardment Group, Heavy on 11 August 1944

Inactivated on 28 August 1945

- Consolidated with the 390th Strategic Missile Wing as the 390th Strategic Missile Wing on 31 January 1984

390th Strategic Missile Wing

- Established as the 390th Bombardment Wing, Medium on 23 March 1953

Redesignated 390th Strategic Missile Wing and activated on 28 November 1961
Organized on 1 January 1962

- Consolidated with the 390th Bombardment Group on 31 January 1984

Inactivated on 31 July 1984

=== Assignments ===
- II Bomber Command, 26 January – 4 July 1943
- 4th Bombardment Wing, July 1943 (attached to 402d Provisional Combat Bombardment Wing)
- 13th Combat Bombardment Wing, 8 January 1944 – 4 August 1945
- Second Air Force, 12–28 August 1945
- Strategic Air Command, 28 November 1961
- 12th Air Division (later 12th Strategic Aerospace Division, 12th Strategic Missile Division, 12th Air Division), 1 January 1962 – 31 July 1984

=== Components ===
- 390th Missile Maintenance Squadron, 1 January 1962 – 31 July 1984
- 568th Bombardment Squadron, 26 January 1943 – 28 August 1945
- 569th Bombardment Squadron, 26 January 1943 – 28 August 1945
- 570th Bombardment Squadron (later 570th Strategic Missile) Squadron), 26 January 1943 – 28 August 1945; 1 January 1962 – 31 July 1984
- 571st Bombardment Squadron (later 570th Strategic Missile) Squadron), 26 January 1943 – 28 August 1945; 1 January 1962 – 2 December 1983

=== Stations ===
- Geiger Field, Washington, 26 January 1943 – 5 June 1943
- Great Falls Army Air Base, Montana, 6 June – 4 July 1943
- RAF Framlingham (Station 153), England, July 1943 – 4 August 1945
- Sioux Falls Army Air Field, South Dakota, 12 – 28 August 1945
- Davis–Monthan Air Force Base, Arizona, 1 January 1962 – 31 July 1984

=== Aircraft and missiles ===
- Boeing B-17 Flying Fortress, 1943–1945
- LGM-25C Titan II, 1962–1984

=== Awards and campaigns ===
Award streamer	Award	Dates	Notes
	Distinguished Unit Citation	17 August 1943 (Germany)	390th Bombardment Group
	Distinguished Unit Citation	14 October 1943 (Germany)	390th Bombardment Group
	Air Force Outstanding Unit Award	1 July 1969 – 30 June 1970	390th Strategic Missile Wing
	Air Force Outstanding Unit Award	1 July 1976 – 30 June 1977	390th Strategic Missile Wing

- Blanchard Trophy, 1979

Campaign Streamer	Campaign	Dates	Notes
	Air Offensive, Europe	July 1943 – 5 June 1944	390th Bombardment Group
	Normandy	6 June 1944 – 24 July 1944	390th Bombardment Group
	Northern France	25 July 1944 – 14 September 1944	390th Bombardment Group
	Rhineland	15 September 1944 – 21 March 1945	390th Bombardment Group
	Ardennes-Alsace	16 December 1944 – 25 January 1945	390th Bombardment Group
	Central Europe	22 March 1944 – 21 May 1945	390th Bombardment Group

== See also ==
- List of USAF Strategic Missile Wings assigned to Strategic Air Command
- List of inactive AFCON wings of the United States Air Force
- B-17 Flying Fortress units of the United States Army Air Forces
- List of 390th aircrew awarded the Distinguished Flying Cross
