= Nuthampstead =

Village in Hertfordshire, England

Coordinates: 51.9928°N 0.0410°E

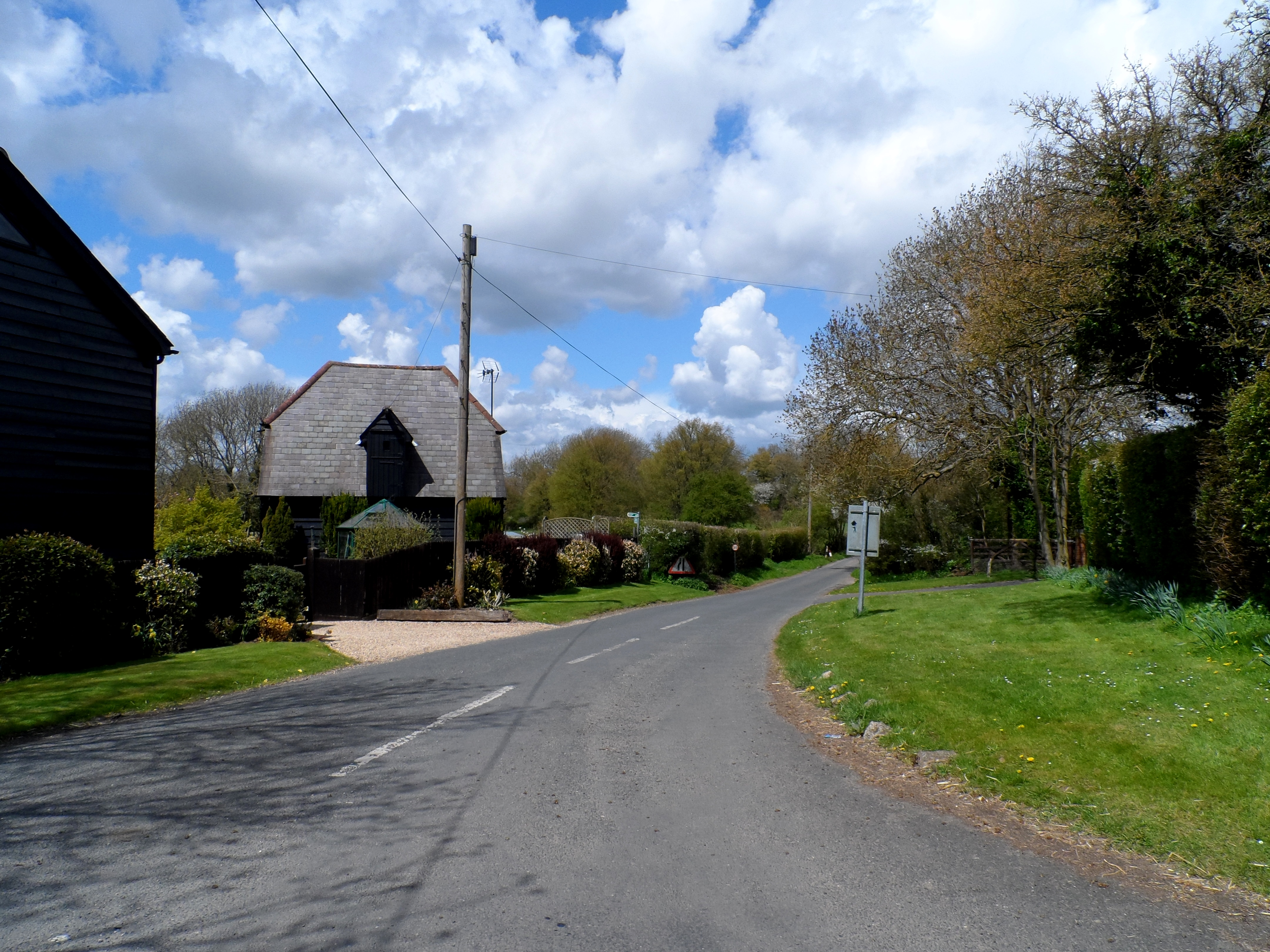
- Entering Nuthampstead

- Location within Hertfordshire
- Population: 141 (Parish, 2021)
- OS grid reference: TL411347
- District: North Hertfordshire
- Shire county: Hertfordshire
- Region: East
- Country: England
- Sovereign state: United Kingdom
- Post town: Royston
- Postcode district: SG8
- Dialling code: 01763
- Police: Hertfordshire
- Fire: Hertfordshire
- Ambulance: East of England
- UK Parliament: North East Hertfordshire

Nuthampstead is a village and civil parish in the North Hertfordshire district of Hertfordshire, England. It is about 5 miles (8 km) south-east of Royston and adjoins the border with Essex. The parish had a population of 141 at the 2021 census.

== History ==
Nuthampstead was historically a hamlet in the parish of Barkway. The hamlet took on civil functions under the poor laws from the 17th century onwards, appointing its own overseer of the poor. Nuthampstead therefore became a civil parish in 1866 when the legal definition of 'parish' was changed to be the areas used for administering the poor laws. Despite becoming a separate civil parish, it remains part of the ecclesiastical parish of Barkway.

During the Second World War, RAF Nuthampstead, located adjacent to the village, was used by the United States Army Air Forces. It was initially occupied by the 55th Fighter Group and later became the principal base of the 398th Bombardment Group, which operated B-17 Flying Fortress heavy bombers on missions over occupied Europe.

Known as USAAF Station 131 during the war, and less formally as AAF Nuthampstead, the airfield was constructed by U.S. Army engineer battalions starting in 1942. The site was formerly Scales Park, which was planted with oak trees after the Battle of Trafalgar. These were cleared to make room for the runways, hangars, and other wartime facilities. Visitors to the site will find that the main runways have since been removed, with a grass runway and service roads only remaining to allow the airfield to be used by light aircraft.

In 1968–71 the Commission on the Third London Airport (the "Roskill Commission") considered Nuthampstead as one of its four short-listed sites, along with Cublington, Foulness (later known as Maplin Sands) and Thurleigh.

Barkway VOR is located at Nuthampstead Airfield.

Areas of the former airfield have been converted into a shooting ground. Since 1992, when planning permission was granted, the ground has developed to enable it to hold major championships in four international shooting disciplines.

== Geography ==
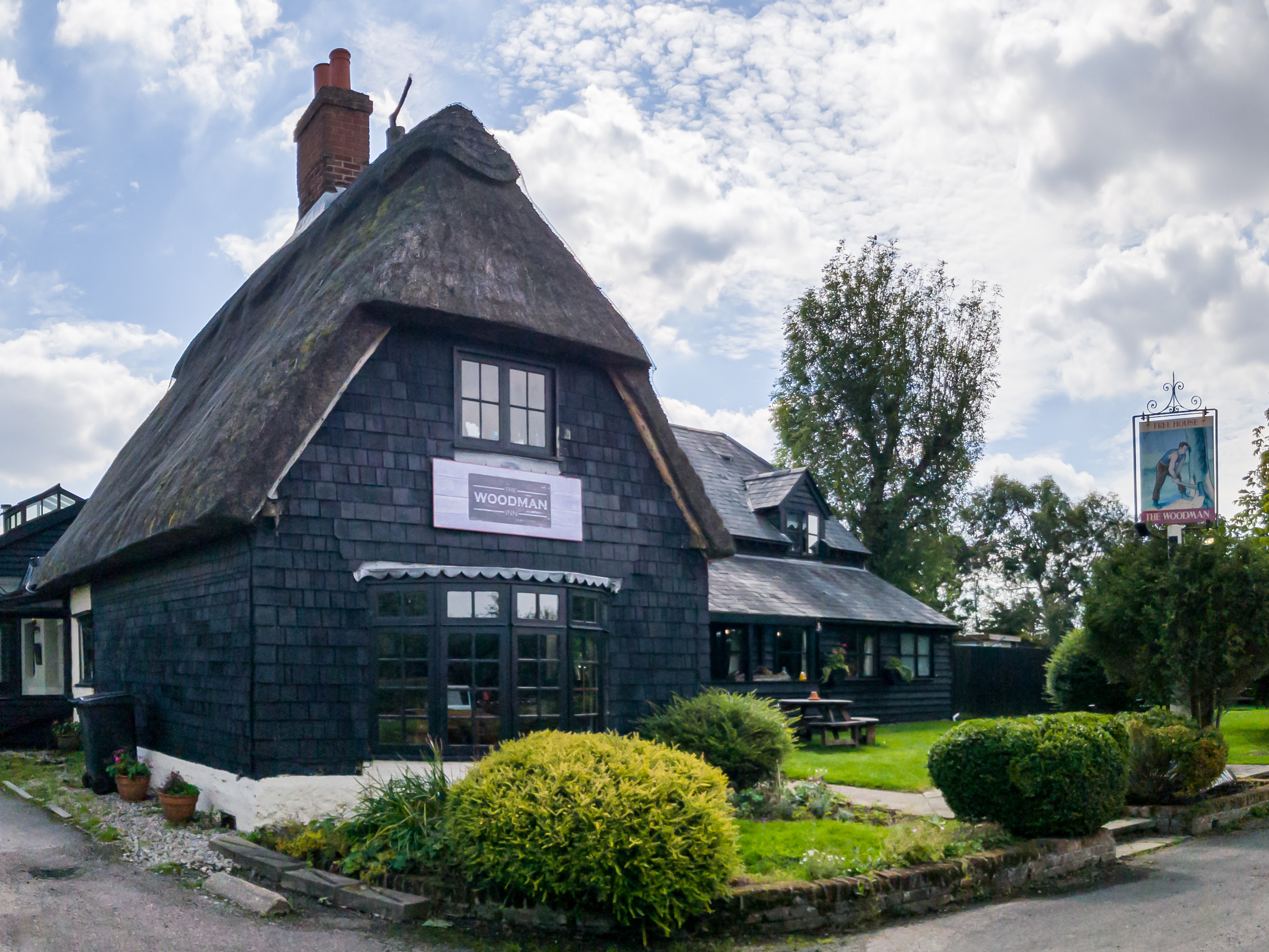
The Woodman Inn

The village has a pub/restaurant with bed and breakfast facilities, called The Woodman Inn. Outside The Woodman Inn is a large memorial stone dedicated to the 398th squadron, and a museum of the airfield's history.

== Governance ==
There are two elected tiers of local government covering Nuthampstead, at district and county level: North Hertfordshire District Council and Hertfordshire County Council. Due to its low population, Nuthampstead has a parish meeting comprising all residents instead of an elected parish council.

== Population ==
At the 2021 census the parish had a population of 141. The population had been 142 in 2011, and 139 in 2001.

== See also ==
- The Hundred Parishes
