= Joint Task Force Liberia =

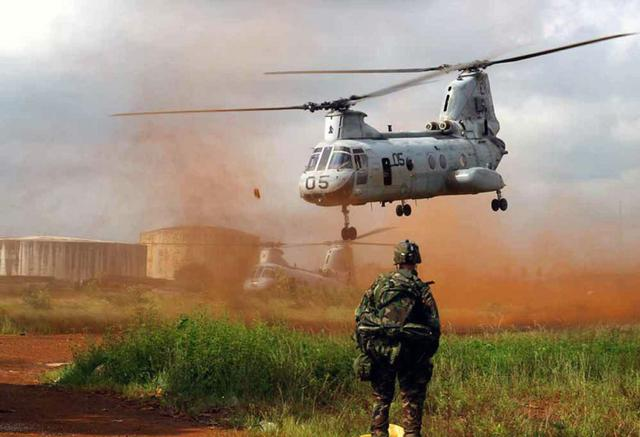
U.S. Marines from 26th Marine Expeditionary Unit land in Liberia

Joint Task Force Liberia was a joint task force formed from August to October 2003 in response to the crisis that developed during the Second Liberian Civil War. The ongoing civil war destabilized the area and created a large number of refugees as rebel forces closed in on Monrovia and took over Bushrod Island. As a result, the Freeport of Monrovia closed, causing food shortages.

As the crisis unfolded, U.S. Ambassador to Liberia John W. Blaney requested military assistance. U.S. Secretary of Defense Donald Rumsfeld approved deployment of U.S. forces on July 20, 2003 and soon afterwards, the United States armed forces established Joint Task Force Liberia.

== Formation and deployment of the task force ==
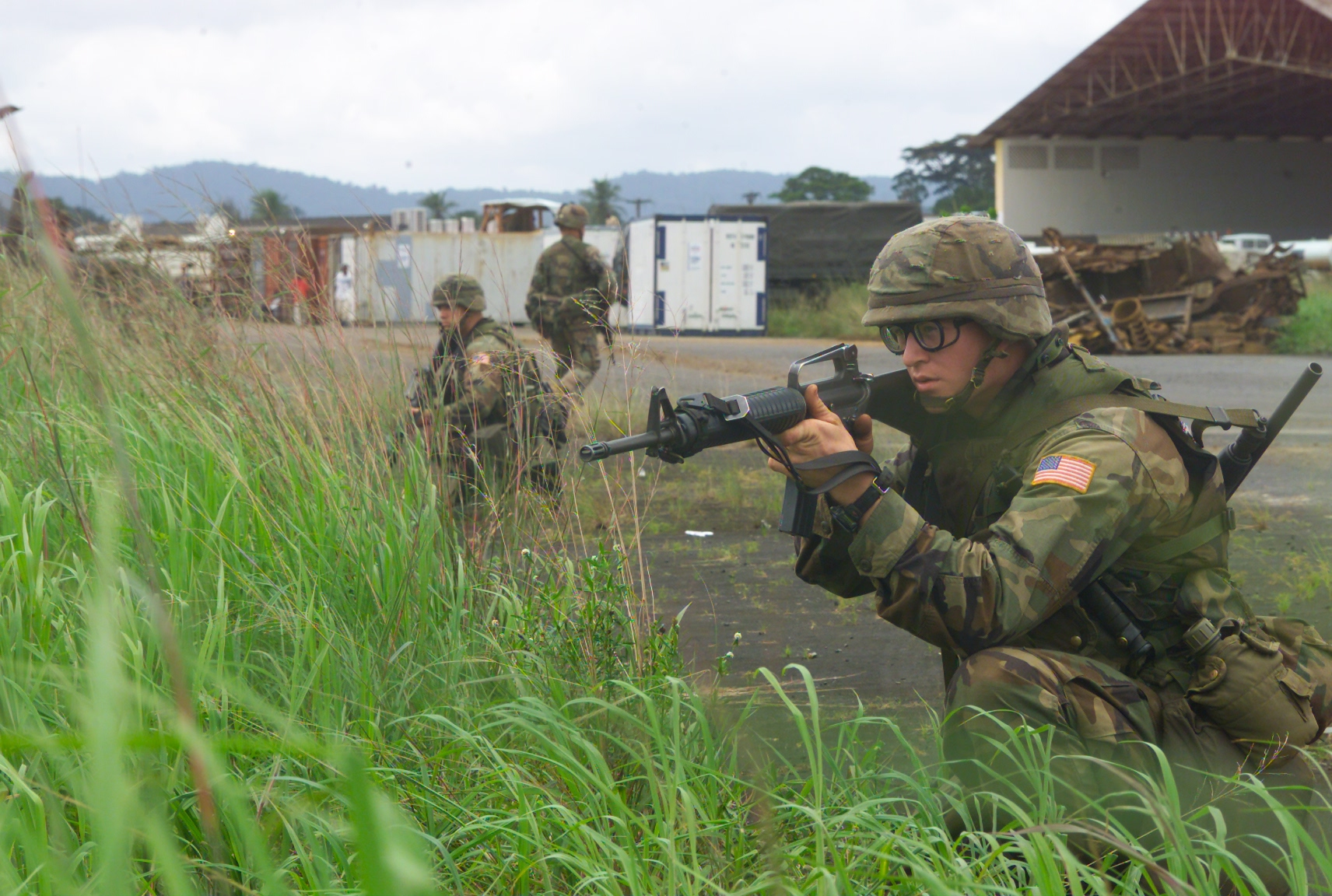
U.S. Marines from 26th Marine Expeditionary Unit secure Roberts International Airport in Monrovia

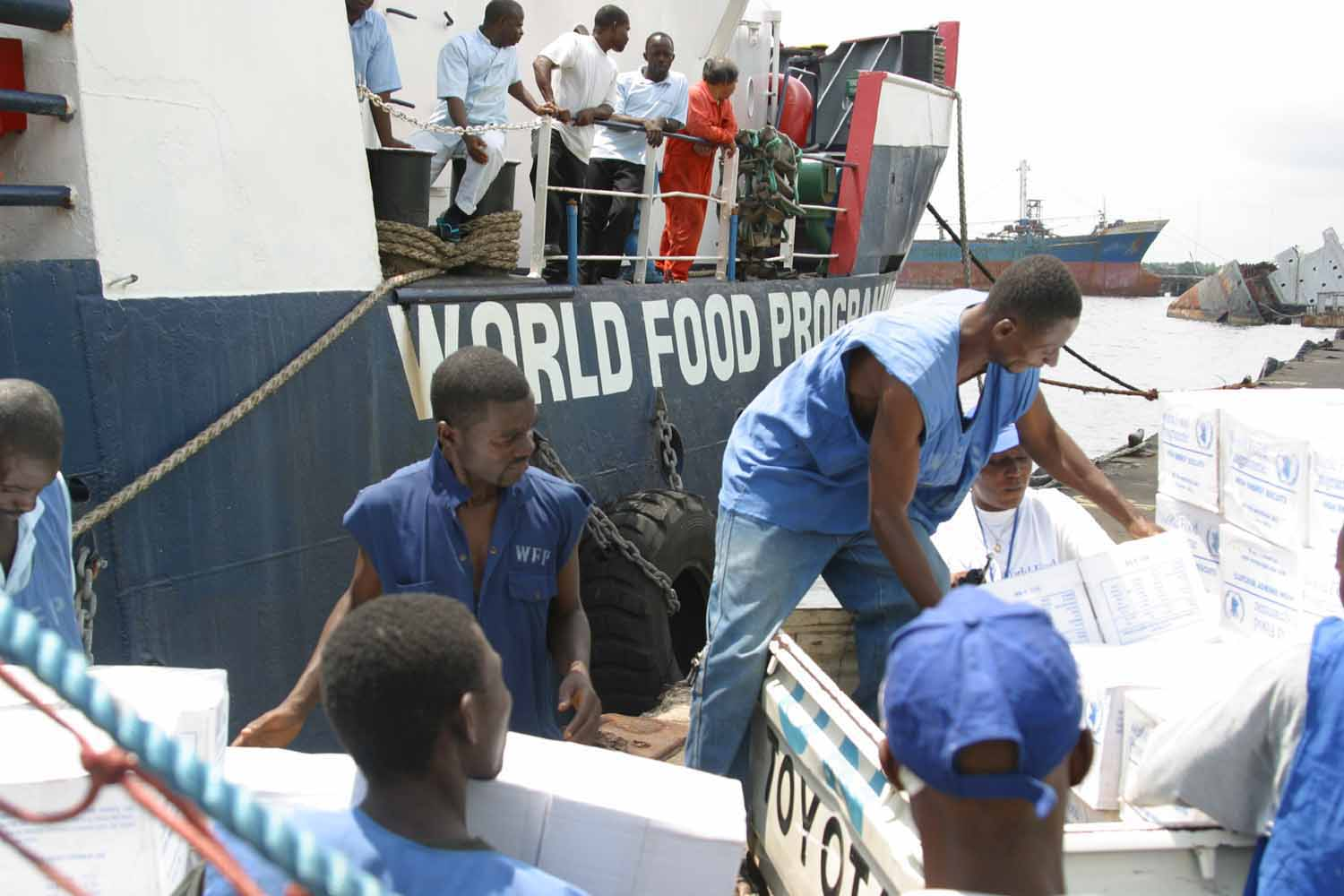
World Food Programme unloads humanitarian aid at the Freeport of Monrovia during JTF Liberia.

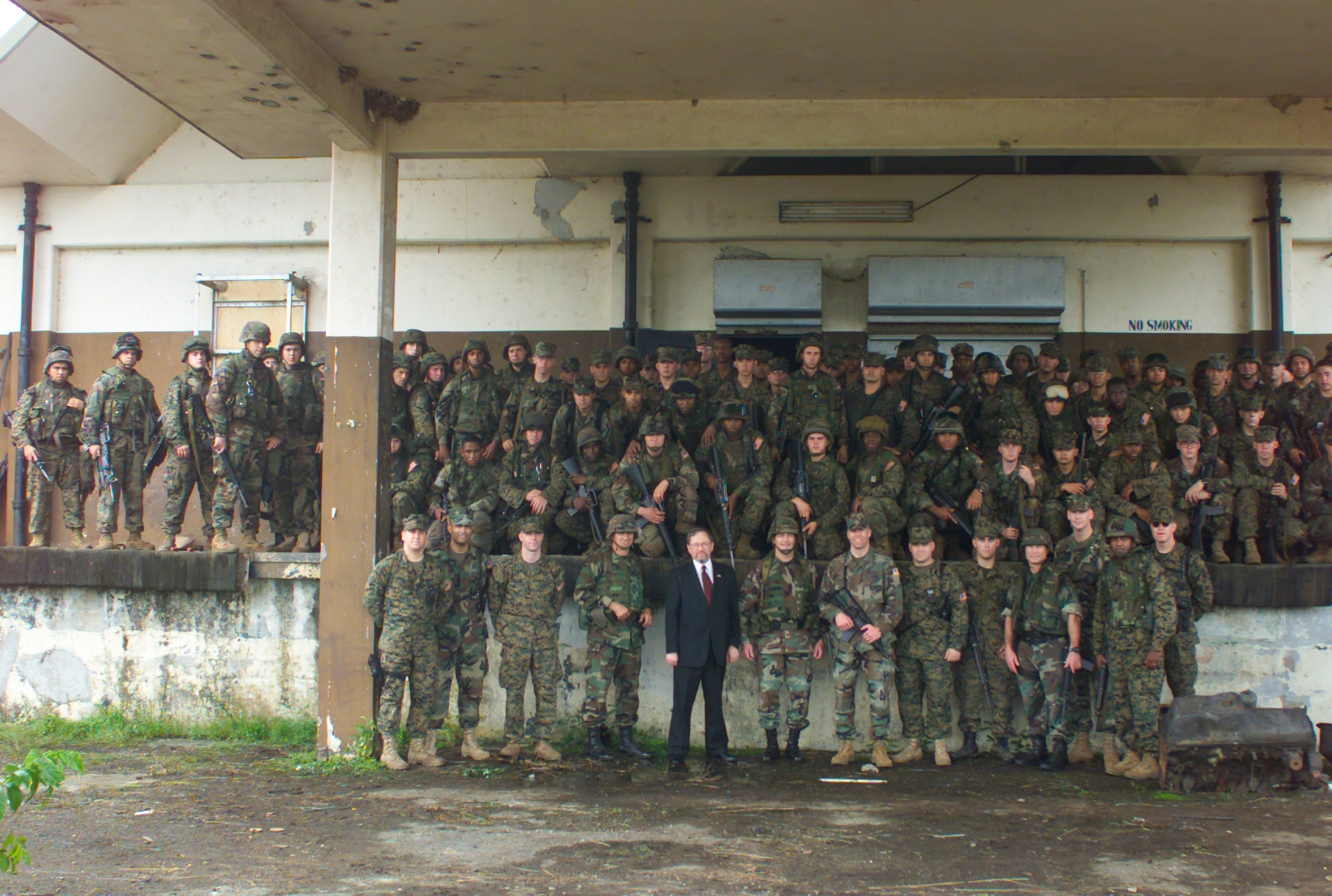
John W. Blaney and Marines from the 26th Marine Expeditionary Unit.

In July 2003, Marines from a forward deployed Fleet Antiterrorism Security Team (FAST) left Naval Station Rota, Spain for Liberia. The FAST platoon reinforced the embassy security and began non-combatant evacuation operations. After a month of the platoon of Marines being alone to defend the Embassy Compound, the 26th MEU, which had steamed at full speed for 2 weeks from the Horn of Africa finally arrived off shore.

In mid-July 2003, EUCOM prepositioned the 398th Air Expeditionary Group to Freetown, Sierra Leone, and Dakar, Senegal to provide Task Force airlift and noncombatant evacuation of U.S. citizens in and around Monrovia. The 398th AEG comprised the 56th Rescue Squadron, 37th Airlift Squadron, 86th Aeromedical Evacuation Squadron, and 75th Airlift Squadron. EUCOM also placed Special Operaations Forces including the 67th Special Operations Squadron in neighboring countries.

Members of the U.S. Army Southern European Task Force formed the headquarters element of the task force while the Iwo Jima Amphibious Ready Group with the 26th Marine Expeditionary Unit provided the operational forces. Also supporting was the Army’s 10th Special Forces Group (United States) and an unidentified United States Navy SEAL team which inspected the Monrovia port area in preparation for the upcoming Marine QRF deployment. The Task Force Command Element Forward embarked aboard the USS Iwo Jima (LHD-7) with the intent of keeping a small footprint ashore.

On August 14, 2003, the Iwo Jima Amphibious Ready Group, Quick Reaction Force, comprised of Marines from the 1st Battalion, 8th Marines conducted an amphibious operation and landed about 150 Marines at Roberts International Airport and another 50 at the Freeport of Monrovia on Bushrod Island. United States Marine Corps AV-8B Harrier II and AH-1 Cobra attack helicopters provided overwatch support. Nigerian Army forces also deployed as part of an ECOMIL, an Economic Community of West African States temporary intervention force. The Joint Task Force Liberia and ECOWAS forces began to stabilize the area and the United Nations brought in humanitarian aid.

President Charles Taylor resigned his presidency and entered exile to Nigeria soon afterwards under pressure from the international community, and the stage was set for the arrival of first an ECOWAS interim peacekeeping force, ECOMIL, and then the UN peacekeeping force the United Nations Mission in Liberia.
