= 902nd Air Refueling Squadron =

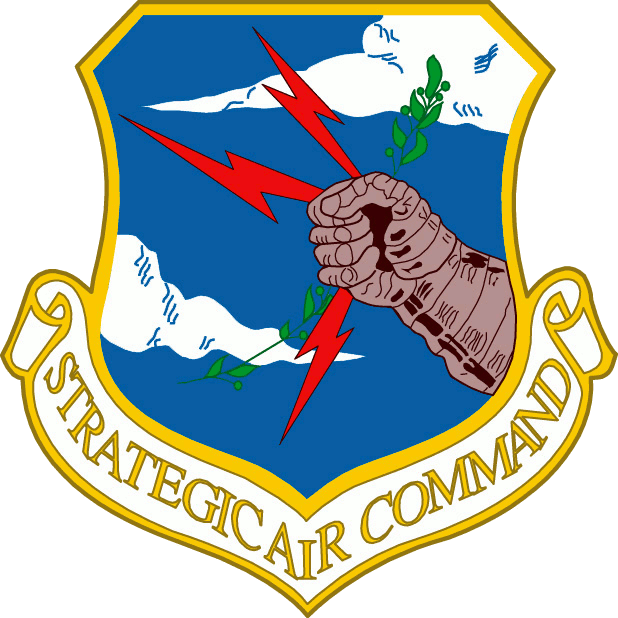
902d Air Refueling Squadron

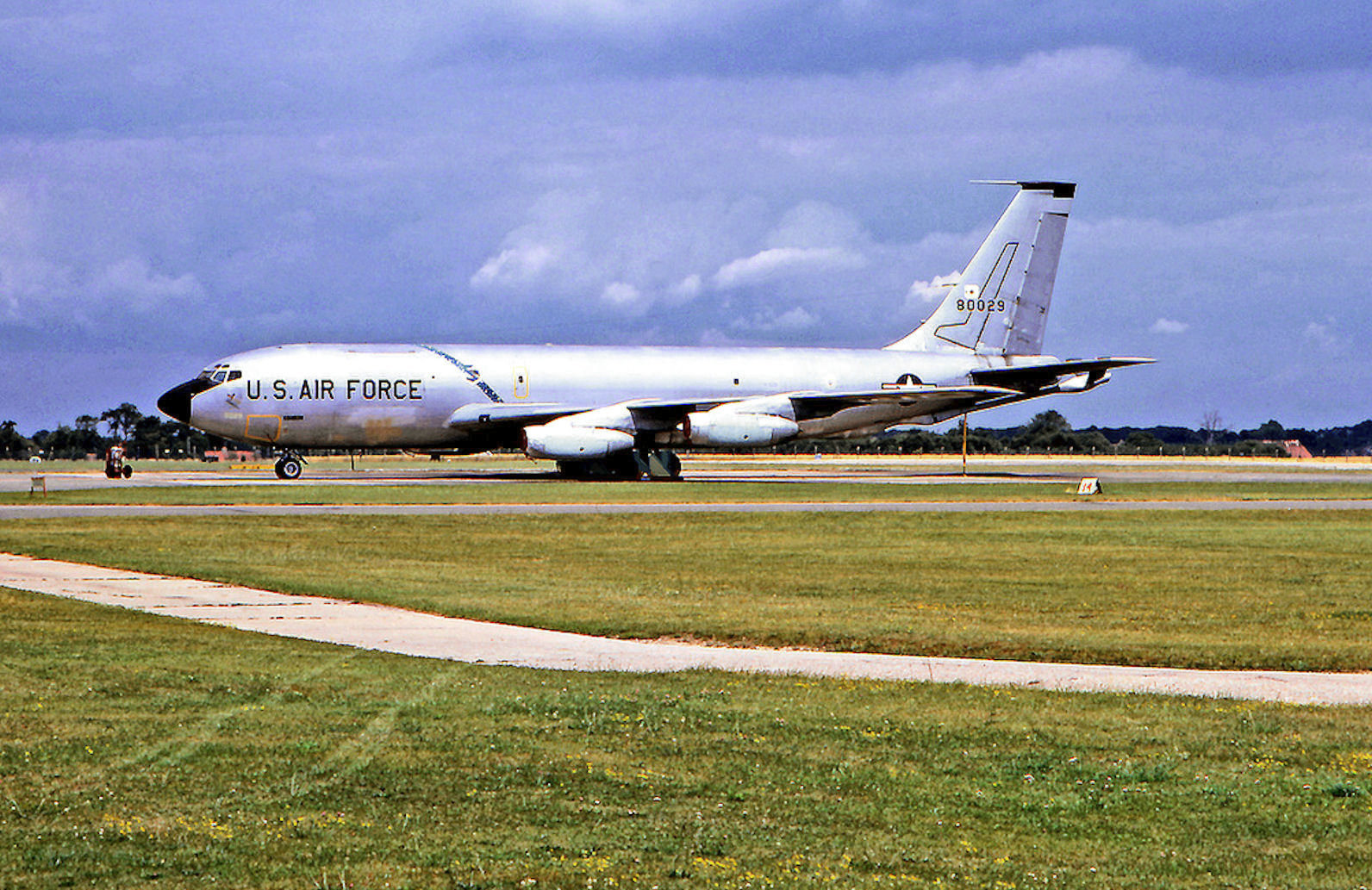
- Boeing KC-135 Stratotanker as flown by the 902d Air Refueling Squadron
- Active: 1943–1945; 1958–1969
- Country: United States
- Branch: United States Air Force
- Role: Air refueling
- Motto: Optimi ab Initio (Latin for 'Best from the Start')
- Engagements: European Theater of Operations

Insignia
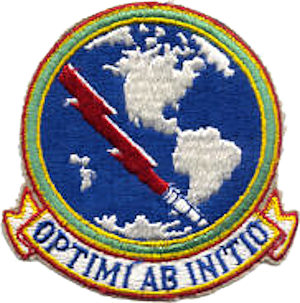
- Patch with 902d Air Refueling Squadron emblem

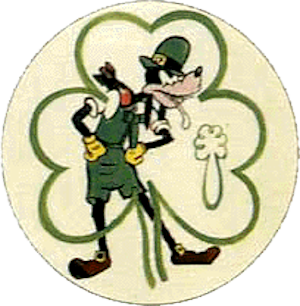
- 602d Bombardment Squadron emblem (Note: Approved 6 March 1944. Description: "Goofy" dog proper, wearing a white shirt, green jacket, tie, trousers and hat, yellow orange shoes, yellow gloves, standing with feet spread apart, hands on hips, and supporting a small black and red aerial bomb on the right shoulder, holding a white clay pipe between the teeth, all before a shamrock formed by a light green outline; shamrock charged in sinister leaf with stylized white aerial bomb outlined green.)
- World War II group tail marking: Triangle W
- World War II squadron fuselage code: K8

The 902d Expeditionary Air Refueling Squadron is an inactive United States Air Force unit. It was last assigned to the 70th Bombardment Wing at Clinton-Sherman Air Force Base, Oklahoma, where it was inactivated on 31 December 1969.

The squadron's first predecessor was the 602d Bombardment Squadron. The unit served for a time as a training unit before deploying to the European Theater of Operations, where it saw combat during World War II as an element of Eighth Air Force. The squadron participated in the strategic bombing campaign against Germany before returning to the United States in 1945, where it was inactivated.

The 902d Air Refueling Squadron served with Strategic Air Command (SAC) at Clinton-Sherman starting in 1958. It maintained an alert status to refuel SAC bombers and deployed aircraft and aircrews to support Operation Chrome Dome and to Southeast Asia to support Operation Arc Light and participated in the Young Tiger Task Force supporting tactical aircraft in Southeast Asia until it was inactivated.

In 1985 the 602d Bombardment Squadron and the 902d Air Refueling Squadron were consolidated into a single unit. The consolidated unit was converted to provisional status in February 2001 as the 902d Expeditionary Air Refueling Squadron.

== History ==
=== World War II ===
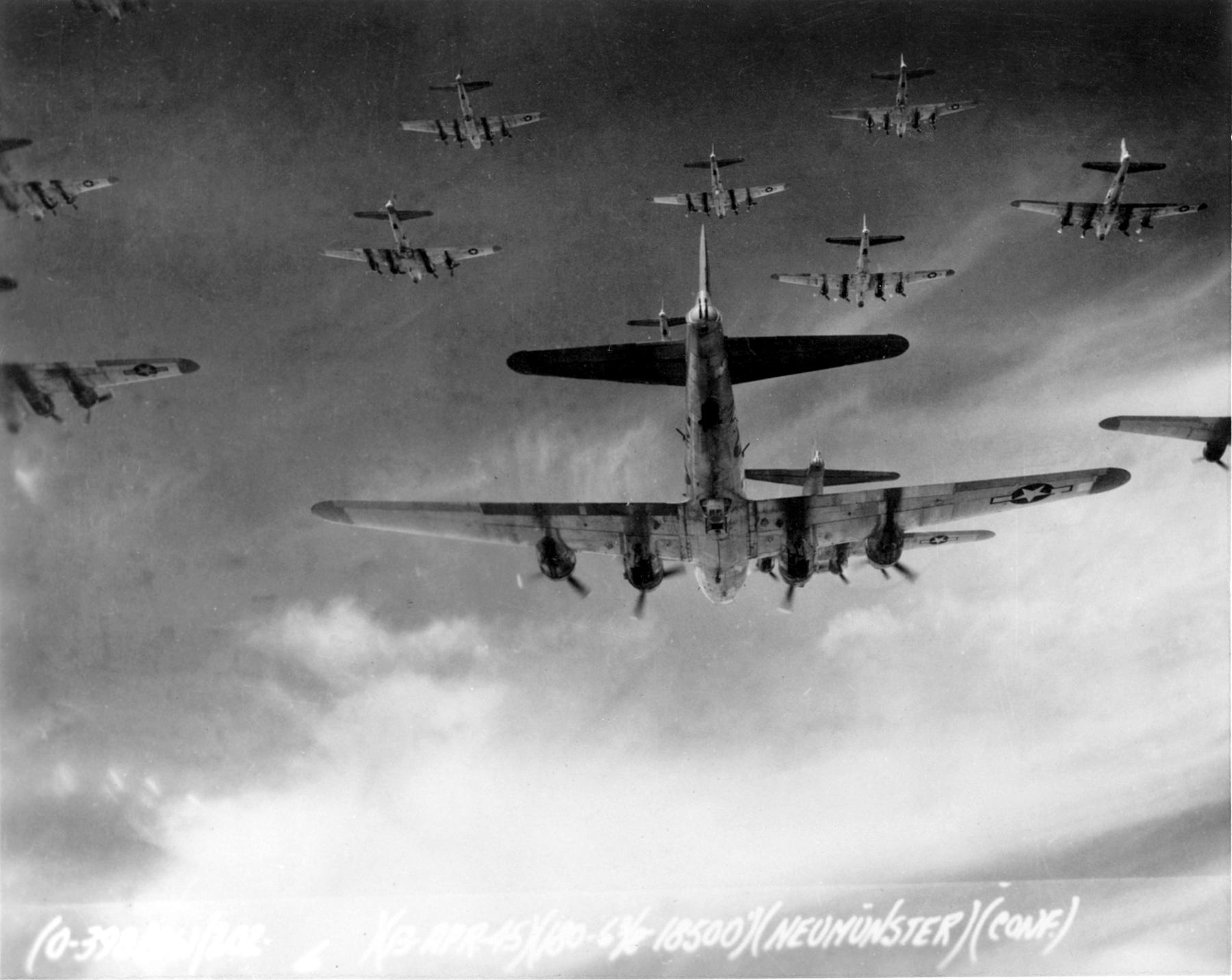
398th Bombardment Group B-17s on a bombing run to Neumünster, Germany

The 602d Bombardment Squadron was activated at Ephrata Army Air Base, Washington, in early 1943, as one of the four original squadrons of the 398th Bombardment Group. The squadron trained under II Bomber Command with Boeing B-17 Flying Fortresses. The squadron's training was interrupted in July 1943, when it became a replacement training unit. Replacement training units were oversized units which trained aircrews prior to their deployment to combat theaters. In November, replacement training ended and the squadron resumed its preparation for overseas deployment.

The 602d deployed to England in April 1944 aboard the USS Wakefield (AP-21). Its parent group was the last B-17 group to be assigned to VIII Bomber Command. The squadron flew its first combat mission the following month. Until V-E Day, the squadron participated in the air offensive against Nazi Germany, bombing such targets as factories in Berlin, marshalling yards in Saarbrücken, shipping facilities in Kiel, oil refineries in Merseburg and aircraft factories in Münster.

In June 1944, prior to Operation Overlord, the Normandy invasion, the squadron temporarily suspended its strategic bombing to attack coastal defenses and enemy troop concentrations on the Cherbourg peninsula. Eighth Air Force took advantage of the diversion from strategic bombing to allow newly arrived units like the 602d to fly attacks against nearby targets to gain combat experience. The first target assigned was a V-1 flying bomb launch site near Sottevast, but the unit's inexperience and overcast conditions in the target area caused it to return to its home station without bombing.

The squadron also struck gun positions near Eindhoven to support Operation Market Garden, the airborne attacks in the Netherlands in September 1944, and attacked power stations, railroads and bridges during the Battle of the Bulge from December until January 1945. It attacked airfields in March 1945, during Operation Varsity, the airborne assault across the Rhine River.

The squadron flew its last combat mission on 25 April 1945, when it attacked the airfield at Plzeň, Czechoslovakia. After the German surrender, it transported liberated prisoners of war from Germany to France. It left Europe in May and returned to the United States aboard the RMS Queen Elizabeth, arriving at the New York Port of Embarkation on 29 June. Squadron members were given thirty days leave, and a cadre assembled at Drew Field, Florida, where the squadron was inactivated in August 1945.

=== Cold War ===
The 902d Air Refueling Squadron was activated in May 1958 at Clinton-Sherman Air Force Base, Oklahoma, by Strategic Air Command (SAC), but it apparently did not receive its Boeing KC-135 Stratotankers until the spring of 1959. It became the refueling component of the 4123d Strategic Wing when the wing moved from Carswell Air Force Base, Texas, in a SAC program to disperse its Boeing B-52 Stratofortress bombers over a larger number of bases, thus making it more difficult for the Soviet Union to knock out the entire fleet with a surprise first strike. The squadron operated Boeing KC-135 Stratotankers, providing air refueling support to the Boeing B-52 Stratofortress strategic bombers of its parent wing and other USAF units. Starting in 1960, one third of the squadron's aircraft were maintained on a fifteen-minute alert, fully fueled and ready for combat, to reduce vulnerability to a Soviet missile strike. This was increased to half the squadron's aircraft in 1962.

The squadron transferred to the 70th Bombardment Wing in 1963, when SAC replaced its Major Command Controlled strategic wings with wings carrying the honors of World War II organizations. In addition to its alert commitment, the squadron deployed crews and airplanes to support the Spanish and Eielson tanker task forces.

The 902d deployed personnel and aircraft to the Young Tiger Task Force in the western Pacific to support combat operations of deployed SAC units and tactical aircraft over Southeast Asia during the Vietnam War, between 1966 and 1969. For several months in 1968 and in 1969, most of its aircrews, plus maintenance and support personnel from its parent wing, were deployed to the Pacific. The squadron inactivated with its parent 70th Bombardment Wing in 1969, as Clinton-Sherman prepared to close.

In September 1985, the 602d Bombardment Squadron and the 902d Air Refueling Squadron were consolidated into a single unit in inactive status.

== Lineage ==
602d Bombardment Squadron

- Constituted as the 602d Bombardment Squadron (Heavy) on 15 February 1943

Activated on 1 March 1943
Redesignated 602d Bombardment Squadron (heavy) in 1944

- Inactivated on 1 September 1945
- Consolidated with the 902d Air Refueling Squadron' on 19 September 1985 as the 902d Air Refueling Squadron

902d Air Refueling Squadron

- Constituted as the 902d Air Refueling Squadron (Heavy) on 28 May 1958

Activated on 11 December 1958
Inactivated on 31 December 1969

- Consolidated with the 602d Bombardment Squadron on 19 September 1985
- Converted to provisional status and redesignated 902d Expeditionary Air Refueling Squadron on 5 February 2001

=== Assignments ===
- 398th Bombardment Group, 1 March 1943 – 1 September 1945
- Second Air Force, 11 December 1958
- 4123d Strategic Wing, 1 March 1959
- 70th Bombardment Wing, 1 February 1963 – 31 December 1969
- United States Air Forces Europe to activate or inactivate as needed

=== Stations ===
- Ephrata Army Air Base, Washington, 1 March 1943
- Bishop Army Air Field, California, 5 April 1943
- Geiger Field, Washington, 29 April 1943
- Rapid City Army Air Base, South Dakota, 10 June 1943 – 4 April 1944
- RAF Nuthampstead (AAF-131), England, 22 April 1944 – 26 May 1945
- Drew Field, Florida, 3 July 1945 – 1 September 1945
- Clinton-Sherman Air Force Base, Oklahoma, 11 December 1958 – 31 December 1969

=== Aircraft ===
- Boeing B-17G Flying Fortress, 1943–1945
- Boeing KC-135A Stratotanker, 1958–1969

=== Awards ===
Award streamer	Award	Dates	Notes
	Air Force Outstanding Unit Award	6 October 1959 – 15 July 1960	902d Air Refueling Squadron
	Air Force Outstanding Unit Award	15 April 1968 – 1 October 1968	902d Air Refueling Squadron

Campaign streamer	Campaign	Dates	Notes
	American Theater	1 March 1943 – 4 April 1944	602d Bombardment Squadron
	Air offensive, Europe	22 April 1944 – 5 June 1944	602d Bombardment Squadron
	Normandy	6 June 1944 – 24 July 1944	602d Bombardment Squadron
	Northern France	25 July 1944 – 14 September 1944	602d Bombardment Squadron
	Rhineland	15 September 1944 – 21 March 1945	602d Bombardment Squadron
	Ardennes-Alsace	16 December 1944 – 25 January 1945	602d Bombardment Squadron
	Central Europe	22 April 1944 – 21 May 1945	602d Bombardment Squadron
	Air combat, EAME Theater	22 April 1944 – 11 May 1945	602d Bombardment Squadron

== See also ==
- List of United States Air Force air refueling squadrons
- B-17 Flying Fortress units of the United States Army Air Forces
