= 601st Bombardment Squadron =

601st Bombardment Squadron (later 601st Tactical Air Support Squadron)
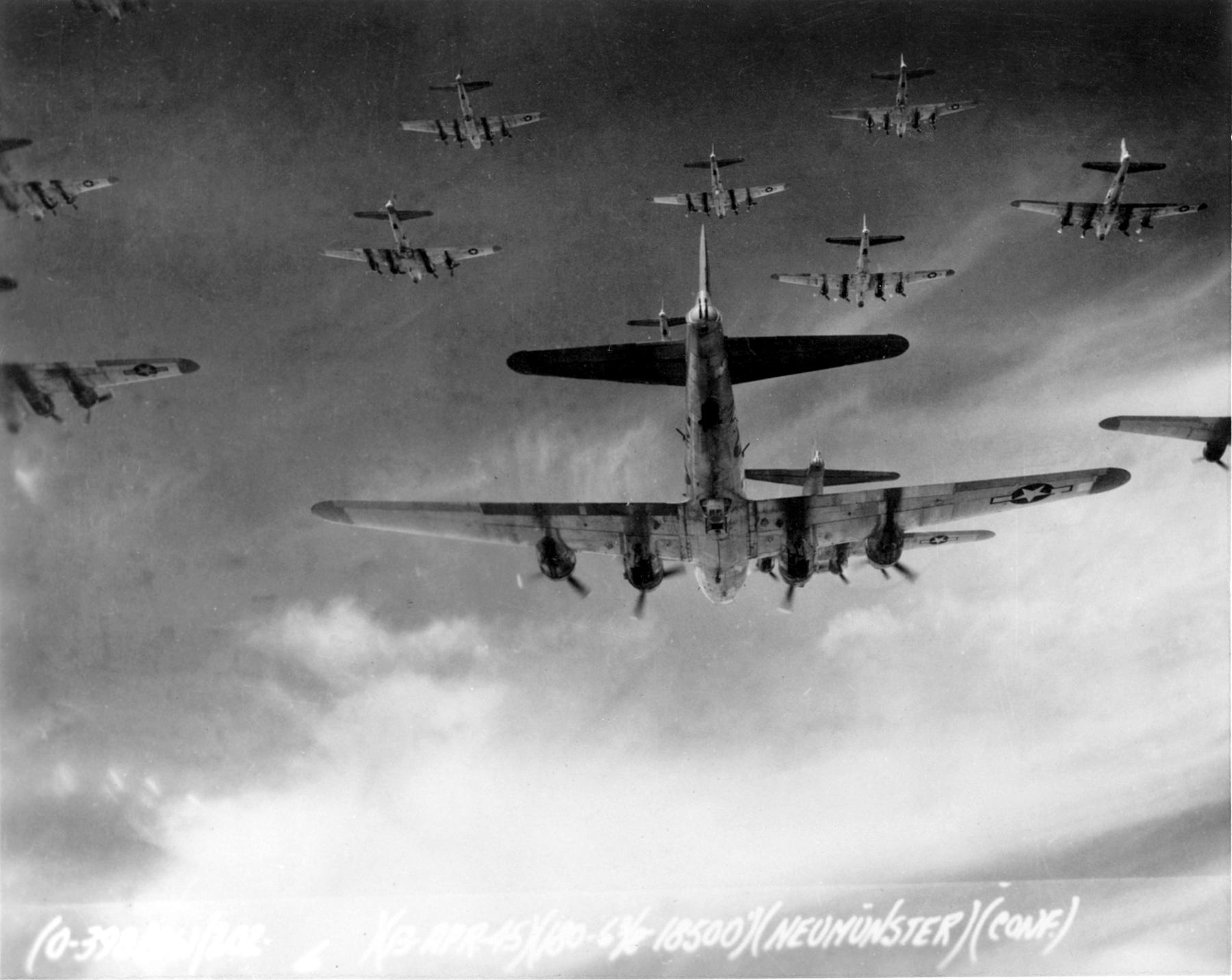
- 398th Bombardment Group B-17s on a bombing run to Neumünster, Germany
- Active: 1943–1945
- Country: United States
- Branch: United States Air Force
- Role: Heavy bomber
- Decorations: Air Force Outstanding Unit Award

Insignia
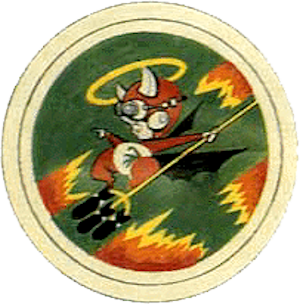
- 601st Bombardment Squadron emblem (Note: Approved 25 October 1943. Description: On a light pastel green disc, border black, piped white, a baby proper, under a golden halo, wearing a red suit and aviator's helmet, black and green ear phones and goggles, having black horns, trimmed white, and black bat wings, grasping in the left hand a white trident with black aerial bomb prongs, in flight above the flames of Hell proper.)

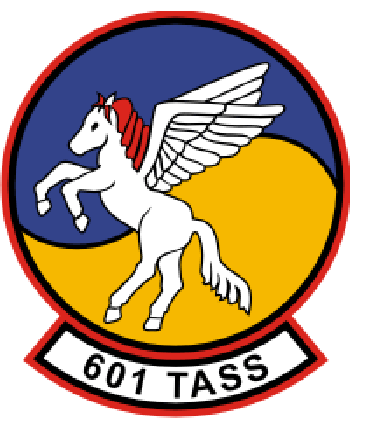
- 601st Tactical Air Support Squadron emblem
- World War II group tail marking: Triangle W
- World War II squadron fuselage code: 3O

The 601st Bombardment Squadron is an inactive United States Air Force unit. It was assigned to the 398th Bombardment Group, and served in combat in the European Theater of Operations, flying its last mission in late April 1945. The squadron moved to Drew Field, Florida, where it was inactivated on 1 September 1945.

In 1985, the squadron was consolidated with the 601st Tactical Air Support Squadron, stationed at Sembach Air Base, Germany. The consolidated squadron was last assigned to the 601st Tactical Control Wing.

== History ==
=== World War II ===
The 601st Bombardment Squadron was activated at Ephrata Army Air Base, Washington in early 1943 as one of the four original squadrons of the 398th Bombardment Group. The squadron trained under II Bomber Command with Boeing B-17 Flying Fortresses. The squadron's training was interrupted in July 1943, when it became a Replacement Training Unit. Replacement training units were oversized units which trained aircrews prior to their deployment to combat theaters. In November, replacement training ended and the squadron resumed its preparation for overseas deployment.

The 601st deployed to England in April 1944 aboard the troopship USS Wakefield. Its parent group was the last B-17 group to be assigned to VIII Bomber Command. The squadron flew its first combat mission the following month. Until V-E Day the squadron participated in the strategic bombing campaign against Germany, bombing such targets as factories in Berlin, marshalling yards in Saarbrücken, shipping facilities in Kiel, oil refineries in Merseburg and aircraft factories in Münster.

In June 1944, prior to Operation Overlord, the Normandy invasion, the squadron temporarily suspended its strategic bombing to attack coastal defenses and enemy troop concentrations on the Cherbourg peninsula. Eighth Air Force took advantage of the diversion from strategic bombing to allow newly arrived units like the 601st to fly attacks against nearby targets to gain combat experience. The first target assigned was a V-1 flying bomb launch site near Sottevast, but the unit's inexperience and overcast conditions in the target area caused it to return to its home station without bombing.

The squadron also struck gun positions near Eindhoven to support Operation Market Garden, the airborne attacks in the Netherlands, in September and attacked power stations, railroads and bridges during the Battle of the Bulge from December until January 1945. It attacked airfields in March 1945 during Operation Varsity, the airborne assault across the Rhine River.

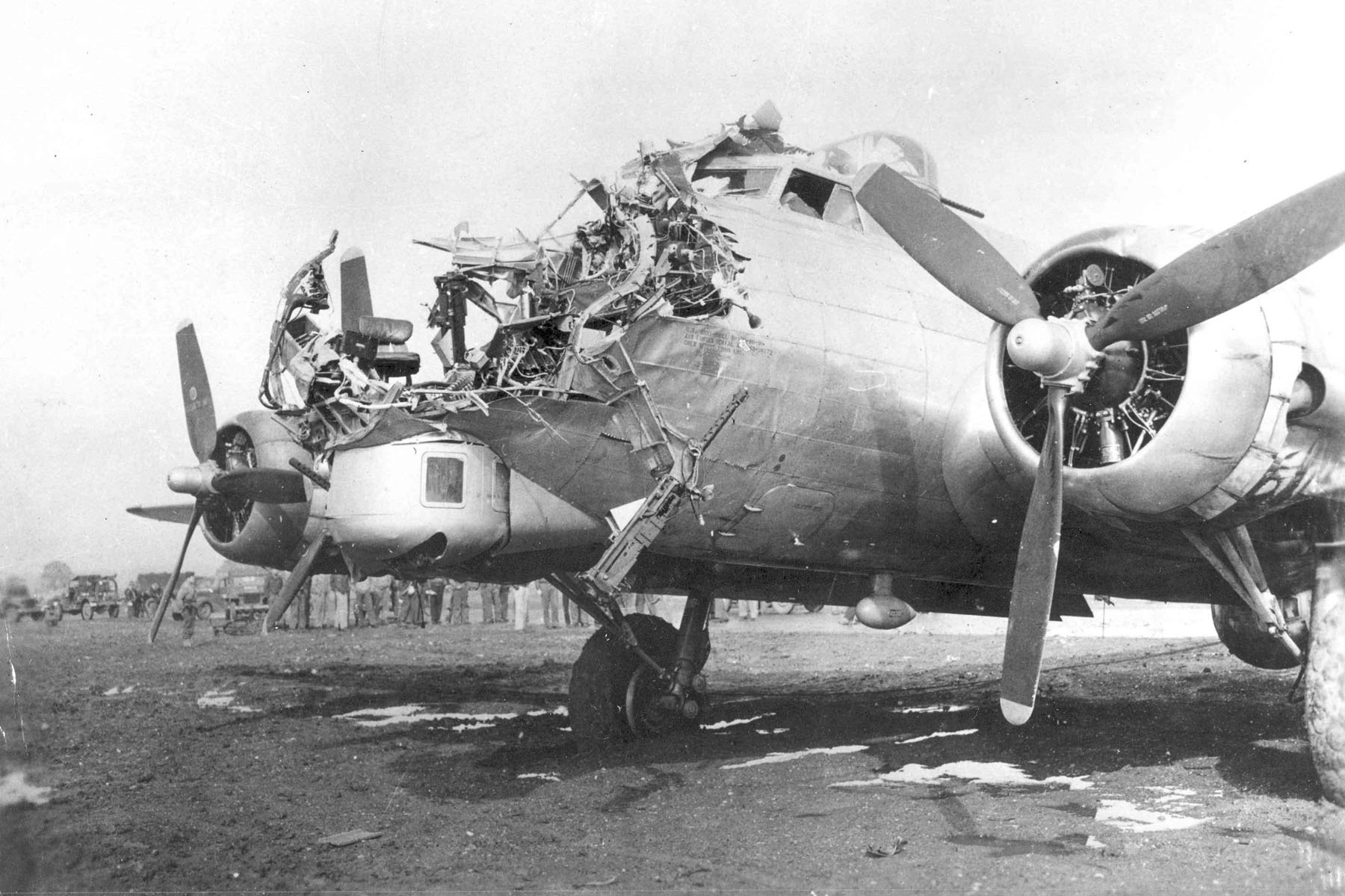
A B-17 bomber from the 601st Bomb Squadron, specifically the "Lovely Julie" (43-38172), had its nose severely damaged by flak during a mission to Cologne on October 15, 1944. The nose was essentially blown off by an 88mm anti-aircraft shell, killing the togglier, Sgt. George Abbott. The navigator, 1st Lt. Raymond J. LeDoux, despite the damage and loss of his colleague, managed to guide the crippled plane back to base, navigating by memory after the cockpit instruments were destroyed

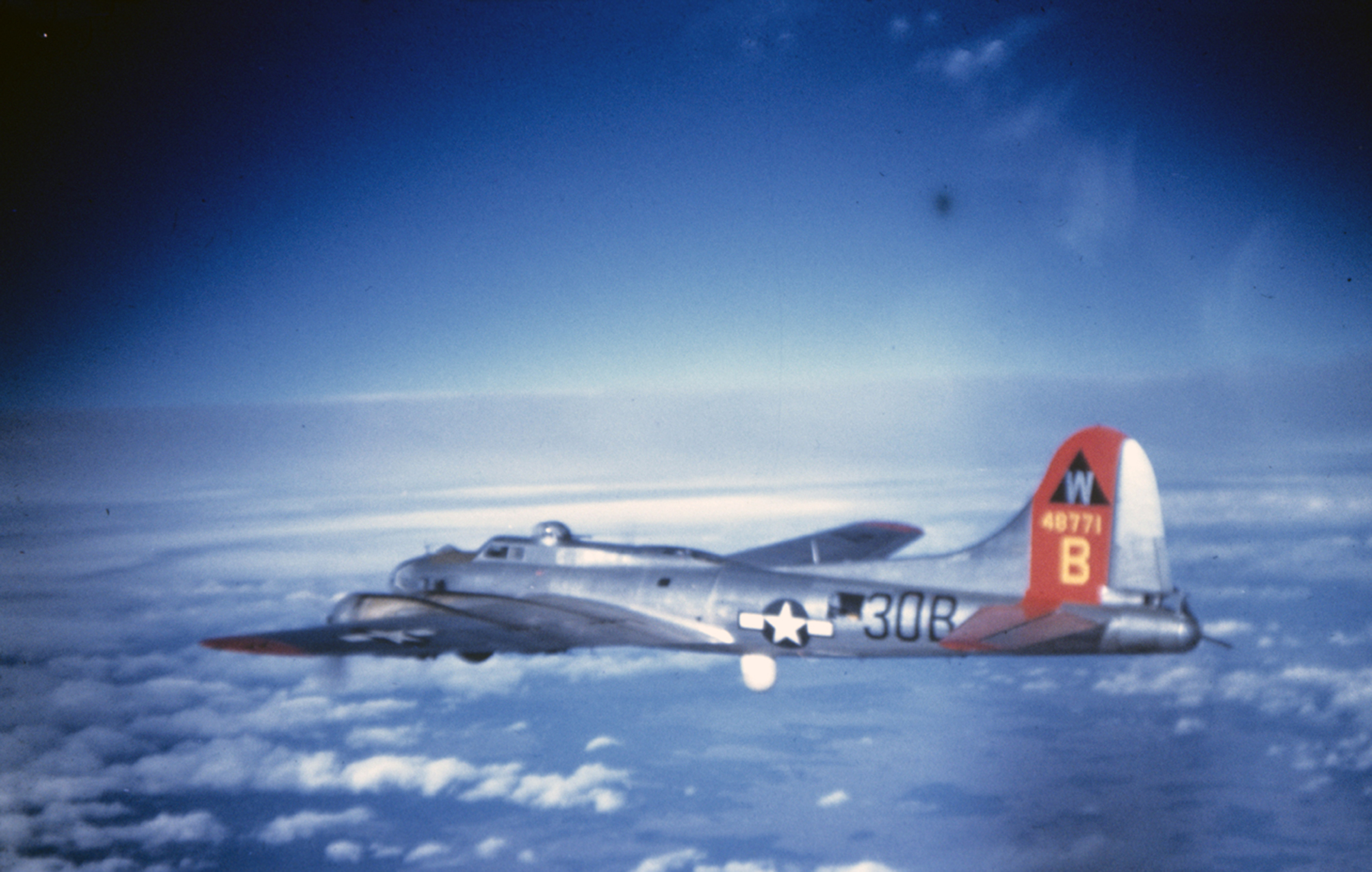
601st Bombardment Squadron B-17G (Note: Aircraft is Lockheed Vega built Boeing B-17G-80-VE Flying Fortress, serial 44-8771, fuselage code 3O-B. This B-17 was reassigned to the 306th Bombardment Group and was salvaged on 30 October 1946. Baugher, Joe (3 April 2023). "1944 USAF Serial Numbers". Joe Baugher..)

The squadron flew its last combat mission on 25 April 1945 when it attacked the airfield at Plzeň, Czechoslovakia. After the German surrender it transported liberated prisoners of war from Germany to France. It left Europe in May and returned to the United States aboard the passenger liner RMS Queen Elizabeth, arriving at the New York Port of Embarkation on 29 June. Squadron members were given thirty days leave, and a cadre assembled at Drew Field, Florida, where the squadron was inactivated in August 1945.

=== Cold War ===
On 19 September 1985 the 601st Tactical Air Support Squadron, a unit that had been activated at Ramstein Air Base, Germany in 1974 as a forward air control unit, and the 601st Bombardment Squadron were consolidated. The consolidated squadron was inactivated in 1988.

== Lineage ==
601st Bombardment Squadron

- Constituted as the 601st Bombardment Squadron (Heavy) on 15 February 1943

Activated on 1 March 1943

- Redesignated 601st Bombardment Squadron Heavy in 1944

Inactivated on 1 September 1945

- Consolidated on 19 September 1985 with the 601st Tactical Air Support Squadron as the 601st Tactical Air Support Squadron

601st Tactical Air Support Squadron

- Constituted as the 601st Tactical Air Support Squadron on 31 January 1974

Activated on 8 July 1974

- Consolidated on 19 September 1985 with the 601st Bombardment Squadron
- Inactivated in 1988

=== Assignments ===
- 398th Bombardment Group, 1 March 1943 – 1 September 1945
- 601st Tactical Air Support Group, 8 July 1974
- 601st Tactical Control Wing, 1 November 1975
- 601st Tactical Air Support Group, 1 May 1977 – 1988

=== Stations ===
- Ephrata Army Air Base, Washington, 1 March 1943
- Bishop Army Air Field, California, 5 April 1943
- Geiger Field, Washington, 29 April 1943
- Rapid City Army Air Base, South Dakota, 10 June 1943 – 4 April 1944
- RAF Nuthampstead (AAF-131), England, 22 April 1944 – 26 May 1945
- Drew Field, Florida, 3 July 1945 – 1 September 1945
- Ramstein Air Base, Germany. 8 July 1974
- Wiesbaden Air Base, Germany,
- Sembach Air Base, Germany, January 1976 – 1988

=== Aircraft ===
- Boeing B-17 Flying Fortress, 1943–1945

=== Awards and campaigns ===
Award streamer	Award	Dates	Notes
	Air Force Outstanding Unit Award	1 January 1980 – 30 June 1981	601st Tactical Air Support Squadron
	Air Force Outstanding Unit Award	1 May 1981 – 30 April 1983	601st Tactical Air Support Squadron

Campaign Streamer	Campaign	Dates	Notes
	American Theater	1 March 1943 – 4 April 1944	601st Bombardment Squadron
	Air Offensive, Europe	22 April 1944 – 5 June 1944	601st Bombardment Squadron
	Normandy	6 June 1944 – 24 July 1944	601st Bombardment Squadron
	Northern France	25 July 1944 – 14 September 1944	601st Bombardment Squadron
	Rhineland	15 September 1944 – 21 March 1945	601st Bombardment Squadron
	Ardennes-Alsace	16 December 1944 – 25 January 1945	601st Bombardment Squadron
	Central Europe	22 April 1944 – 21 May 1945	601st Bombardment Squadron
	Air Combat, EAME Theater	22 April 1944 – 11 May 1945	601st Bombardment Squadron
