= 603d Bombardment Squadron =

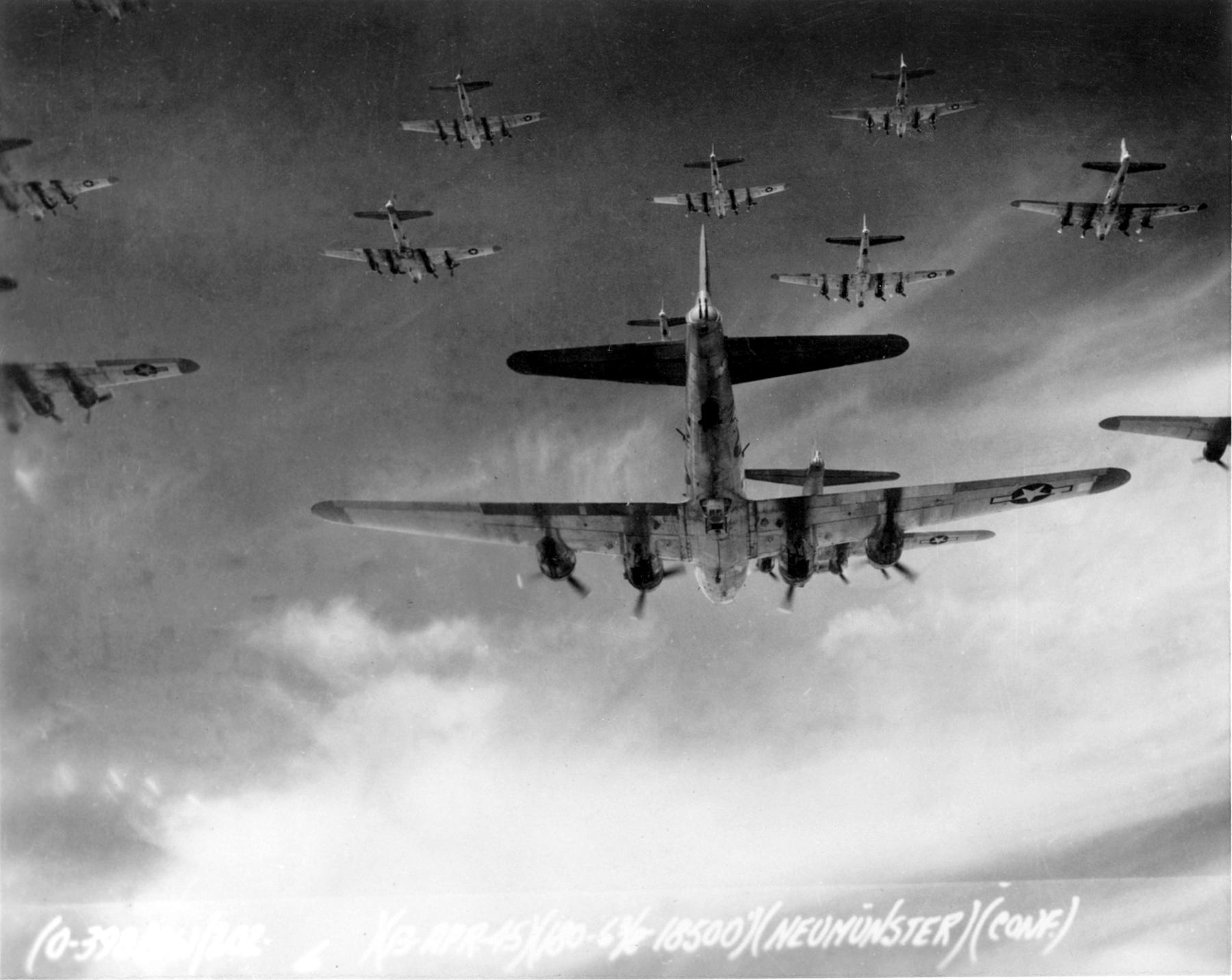
- 398th Bombardment Group B-17s on a bombing run to Neumünster, Germany
- Active: 1943-1945
- Country: United States
- Branch: United States Army Air Forces
- Role: Heavy bomber
- Engagements: European Theater of Operations

Insignia
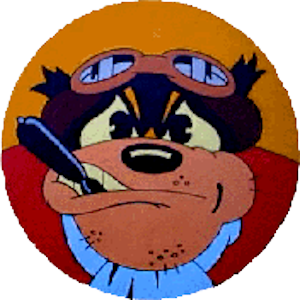
- 603d Bombardment Squadron emblem (Note: Approved 25 October 1943. Description: On a lemon yellow disc, the head and shoulders of a pugnacious, caricatured back bull dog proper, chewing on fin of black aerial bomb, and wearing brown aviator's helmet, tan goggles, trimmed blue, brick red jersey, and a light turquoise blue scarf wrapped around the neck.)
- World War II group tail marking: Triangle W
- World War II squadron fuselage code: N7

The 603d Bombardment Squadron is an inactive United States Air Force unit. It was last assigned to the 398th Bombardment Group at Drew Field, Florida, where it was inactivated on 1 September 1945. The squadron was activated in 1943, and after briefly serving as a Replacement Training Unit, moved to England where it saw combat in the European Theater of Operations as an element of VIII Bomber Command.

== History ==
The 603th Bombardment Squadron was activated at Ephrata Army Air Base, Washington in early 1943 as one of the four original squadrons of the 398th Bombardment Group. The squadron trained under II Bomber Command with Boeing B-17 Flying Fortresses. The squadron's training was interrupted in July 1943, when it became a Replacement Training Unit. Replacement training units were oversized units which trained aircrews prior to their deployment to combat theaters. In November, replacement training ended and the squadron resumed its preparation for overseas deployment.

The 603d deployed to England in April 1944 aboard the USS Wakefield (AP-21). Its parent group was the last B-17 group to be assigned to VIII Bomber Command. The squadron flew its first combat mission the following month. Until V-E Day the squadron participated in the air offensive against Nazi Germany, bombing such targets as factories in Berlin, marshalling yards in Saarbrücken, shipping facilities in Kiel, oil refineries in Merseburg and aircraft factories in Münster.

In June 1944, prior to Operation Overlord, the Normandy invasion, the squadron temporarily suspended its strategic bombing to attack coastal defenses and enemy troop concentrations on the Cherbourg peninsula. Eighth Air Force took advantage of the diversion from strategic bombing to allow newly arrived units like the 603d to fly attacks against nearby targets to gain combat experience. The first target assigned was a V-1 flying bomb launch site near Sottevast, but the unit's inexperience and overcast conditions in the target area caused it to return to its home station without bombing.

The squadron also struck gun positions near Eindhoven to support Operation Market Garden, the airborne attacks in the Netherlands, in September and attacked power stations, railroads and bridges during the Battle of the Bulge from December until January 1945. It attacked airfields in March 1945 during Operation Varsity, the airborne assault across the Rhine River.

The squadron flew its last combat mission on 25 April 1945 when it attacked the airfield at Plzeň, Czechoslovakia. After the German surrender it transported liberated prisoners of war from Germany to France. It left Europe in May and returned to the United States aboard the RMS Queen Elizabeth, arriving at the New York Port of Embarkation on 29 June. Squadron members were given thirty days leave, and a cadre assembled at Drew Field, Florida, where the squadron was inactivated in August 1945.

== Lineage ==
- Constituted as the 603d Bombardment Squadron (Heavy) on 15 February 1943

Activated on 1 March 1943
Redesignated 603d Bombardment Squadron, Heavy in 1944
Inactivated on 1 September 1945

=== Assignments ===
- 398th Bombardment Group, 1 March 1943 - 1 September 1945

=== Stations ===
- Ephrata Army Air Base, Washington, 1 March 1943
- Bishop Army Air Field, California, 5 April 1943
- Geiger Field, Washington, 29 April 1943
- Rapid City Army Air Base, South Dakota, 10 June 1943 – 4 April 1944
- RAF Nuthampstead (AAF-131), England, 22 April 1944 – 26 May 1945
- Drew Field, Florida, 3 July 1945 - 1 September 1945

=== Aircraft ===
- B-17 Flying Fortress, 1943-1945

=== Campaigns ===
Campaign Streamer	Campaign	Dates	Notes
	American Theater	1 March 1943 – 4 April 1944	603d Bombardment Squadron
	Air Offensive, Europe	22 April 1944 – 5 June 1944	603d Bombardment Squadron
	Normandy	6 June 1944 – 24 July 1944	603d Bombardment Squadron
	Northern France	25 July 1944 – 14 September 1944	603d Bombardment Squadron
	Rhineland	15 September 1944 – 21 March 1945	603d Bombardment Squadron
	Ardennes-Alsace	16 December 1944 – 25 January 1945	603d Bombardment Squadron
	Central Europe	22 April 1944 – 21 May 1945	603d Bombardment Squadron
	Air Combat, EAME Theater	22 April 1944 – 11 May 1945	603d Bombardment Squadron
