= Marcelyn A. Atwood =

Retired United States Air Force Colonel

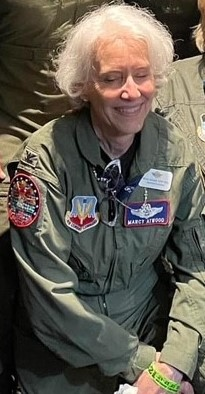
Marcelyn A. Atwood at the 2023 Women in Aviation International Conference

Marcelyn Adkins "Marcy" Atwood is a retired United States Air Force (USAF) colonel who flew as a navigator in KC-135 Stratotankers, E-4B National Airborne Operations Center, and the RC-135 Rivet Joint aircraft over her 24-year USAF career. She is also the first woman to command a flying training squadron and the first U.S. Air Force officer to command a Navy squadron.

== Career ==
After attending the University of Oregon and receiving a bachelor's degree in music education in May 1978, Marcelyn Atwood joined the USAF in October 1980 and entered navigator training at Randolph Air Force Base outside San Antonio, Texas. On 21 March 1997, she became the first woman to command a flying training squadron and the first U.S. Air Force officer to command a Navy squadron at NAS Pensacola, Florida, when she assumed command of US Navy Training Squadron 10 which trained both naval and air force aviators. She would remain as commander until 27 March 1998. On 27 October 1999, Atwood was nominated to the rank of colonel, the rank at which she would retire. In 2003, Atwood was deployed in support of Operation Iraqi Freedom and was the commander of the 398th Air Expeditionary Group while it was based at the Naval Support Activity Souda Bay, Crete. Her last position was as the 55th Operations Group commander at Offutt AFB near Omaha, Nebraska, before retiring in August 2005.

== Retirement ==
After leaving the air force, Atwood spent nearly two years at the defense contractor Science Applications International Corporation providing strategic planning consulting to the Air Force Headquarters and the Joint Improvised Explosive Device Defeat Organization. In 2007, she joined a firm which provides information technology engineering services. In 2008, she helped to establish the military criminal defense law firm of Puckett and Faraj, PC, for which she is business manager. In 2010, Atwood formed The Crisp Atwood Group, LLC, a personal services firm.

She is also a board member for Count US In, a non-profit, non-partisan 501(3c) organization which works to ensure that US military voters are not disenfranchised. Atwood has been married to husband Marty Adkins since 1988.
