= 398th Air Expeditionary Group =

398th Air Expeditionary Group

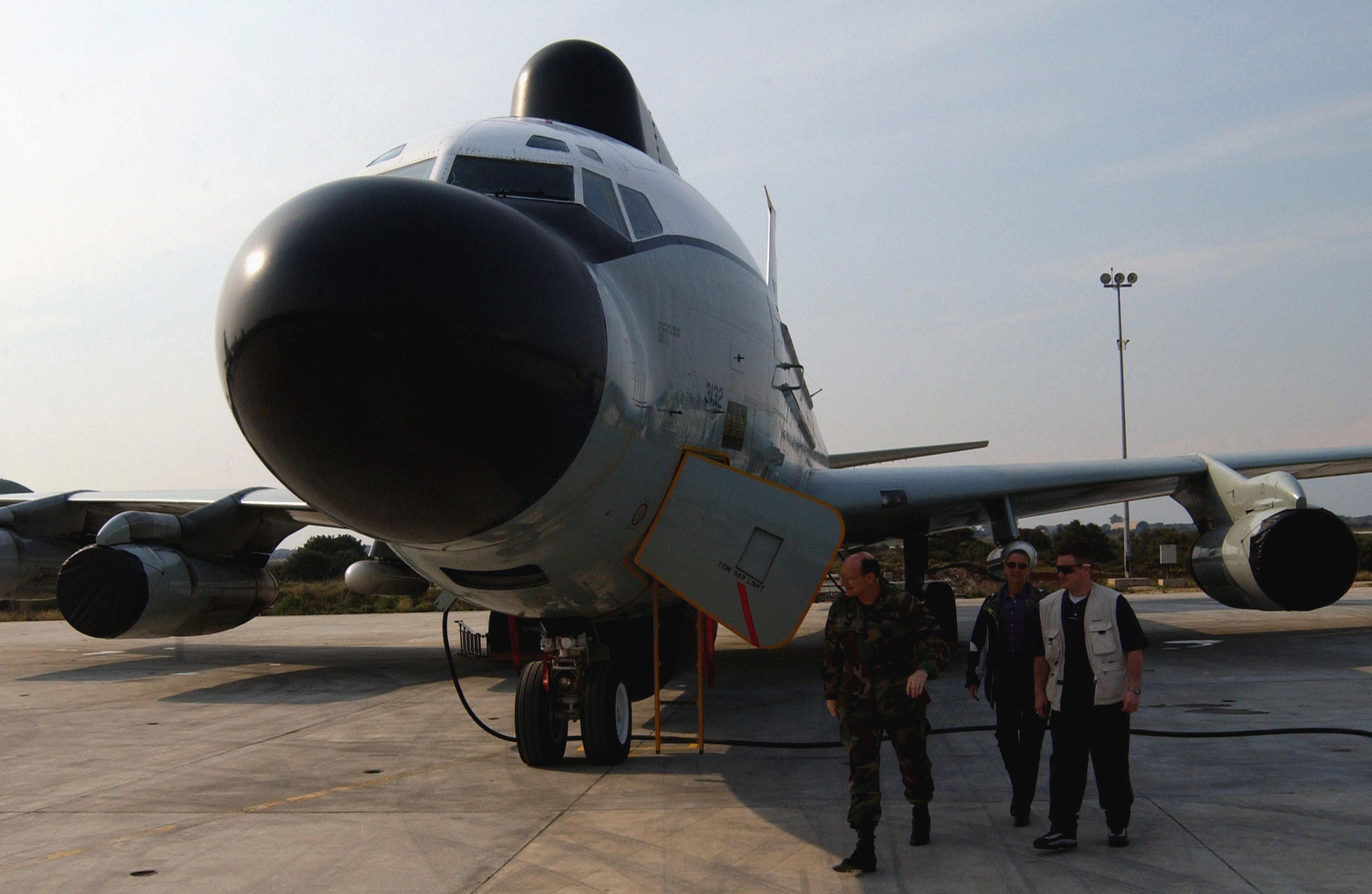
- General Gregory S. Martin, USAFE Commander, is given a tour of a NKC-135 during a visit to the 398th Air Expeditionary Group during Operation Iraqi Freedom
- Active: 1943–1945; 1992-1995; 2003; 2004; 2006; 2008
- Country: United States
- Branch: United States Air Force
- Role: Expeditionary operations
- Part of: United States Air Forces in Europe
- Engagements: European Theater of Operations; Operation Iraqi Freedom; Operation Shining Express; Joint Task Force Liberia; Operation Noble Endeavor

Insignia
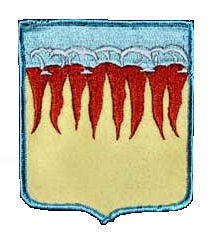
- 398th Bombardment Group emblem WWII "Hell from Heaven"
- 398th BG B-17 WWII tail flash: Triangle W

The 398th Air Expeditionary Group is a provisional United States Air Force unit assigned to the United States Air Forces in Europe. The 398 AEG may be activated or inactivated at any time.

During World War II, its predecessor unit, the 398th Bombardment Group (Heavy) was an Eighth Air Force B-17 Flying Fortress unit in England, stationed at RAF Nuthampstead. The group flew 195 combat missions, the last being on 25 April 1945.

== History ==
=== World War II ===
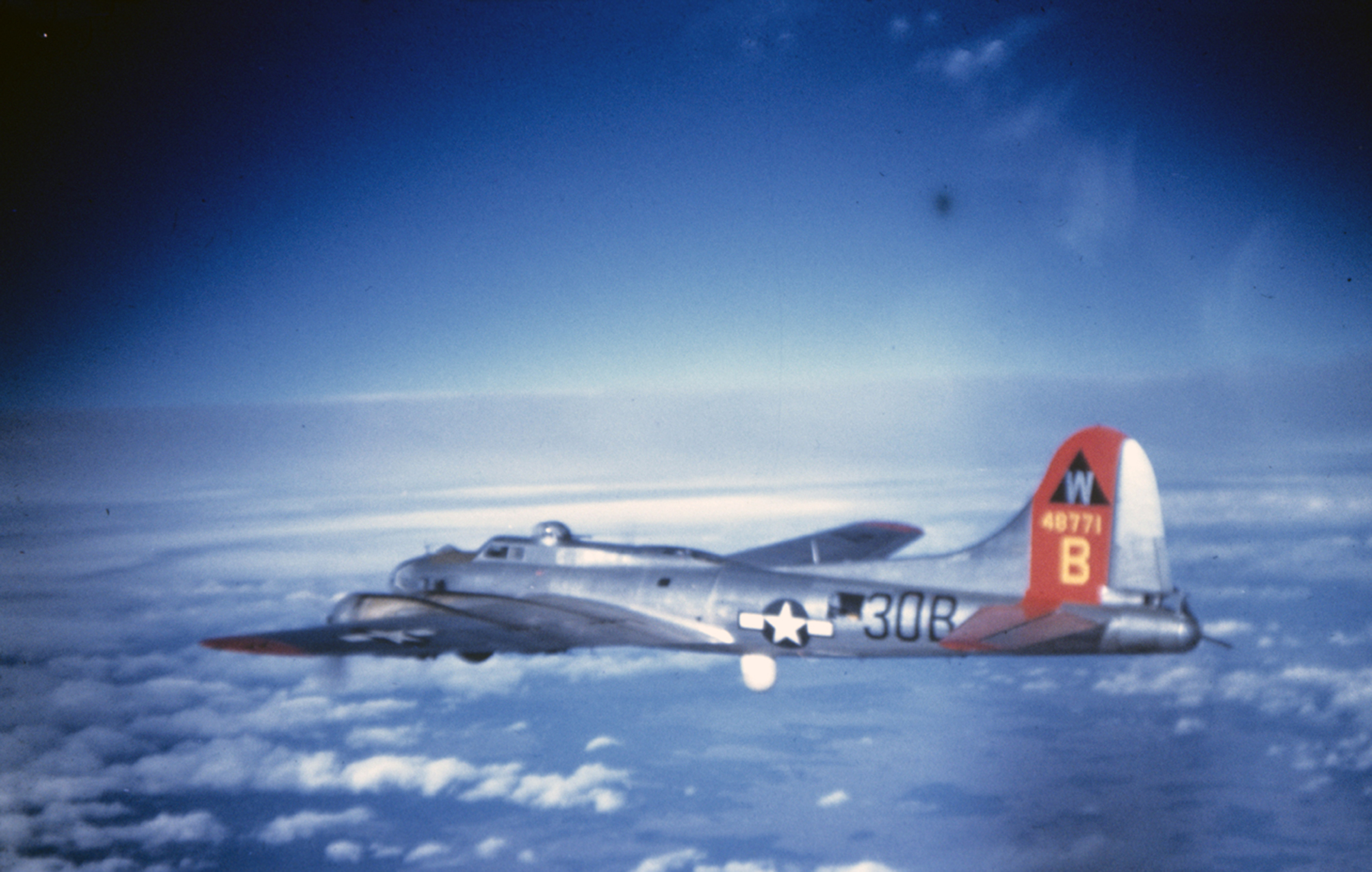
601st Bombardment Squadron B-17G (Note: Aircraft is Lockheed/Vega built Boeing B-17G-80-VE Flying Fortress serial 44-8771. This B-17 was assigned to the 398th BG on 2 March 1945. It flew six combat missions before being flown back to the United States on 23 May.)

The group was constituted as the 398th Bombardment Group (Heavy) on 15 February 1943, and equipped with the B-17 Flying Fortress. It was activated 1 March 1943 at Ephrata Army Air Base, Wash., with the 600th, 601st, 602d, and 603d Bombardment Squadrons. The Group assembled at Blythe Army Air Field, California, and then moved to Geiger Field, Washington, on 20 April 1943 to complete training.

On 20 June 1943 moved to Rapid City Army Air Base, South Dakota, to take up Replacement Training Unit duties. Trained 326 B-17 crews from August to December 1943 but at the beginning of the New Year reverted to training for combat. Ground echelon began movement overseas on 4 April 1944. The unit moved to Camp Myles Standish, Massachusetts, on 7–12 April 1944. Personnel embarked on USS Wakefield. Sailed to Boston on 13 April, and arrived in Liverpool on 21 April 1944.

Moved to England in April 1944 and became part of Eighth Air Force. The 398th entered combat in May 1944, and until V-E Day operated primarily against strategic objectives in Germany, attacking targets such as factories in Berlin, warehouses in Munich, marshalling yards in Saarbrücken, shipping facilities in Kiel, oil refineries in Merseburg, and aircraft plants in Münster.

The group temporarily suspended strategic missions to attack coastal defenses and enemy troops on the Cotentin Peninsula during the Invasion of Normandy in June 1944. The group struck gun positions near Eindhoven in support of the air attack on Holland in September 1944, and raided power stations, railroads, and bridges during the Battle of the Bulge, December 1944 – January 1945. The group flew missions attacking airfields to aid the Allied assault across the Rhine in March 1945.

The 398th flew its last combat mission, attacking an airfield in Plzeň, Czechoslovakia, on 25 April 1945. After V-E Day the group transported liberated prisoners from Germany to France.

From Nuthampstead, the 398th Bomb Group flew 195 combat missions. Redeployed USA in May/June 1945. The aircraft left on 21–27 May 1945. The Ground unit went to Greenock on 22 June 1945 and sailed on RMS Queen Elizabeth arriving in New York on 29 June 1945. After 30 days R & R some personnel assembled at Drew Field, Florida, where the Group was inactivated on 1 September 1945.

=== Post Cold War ===
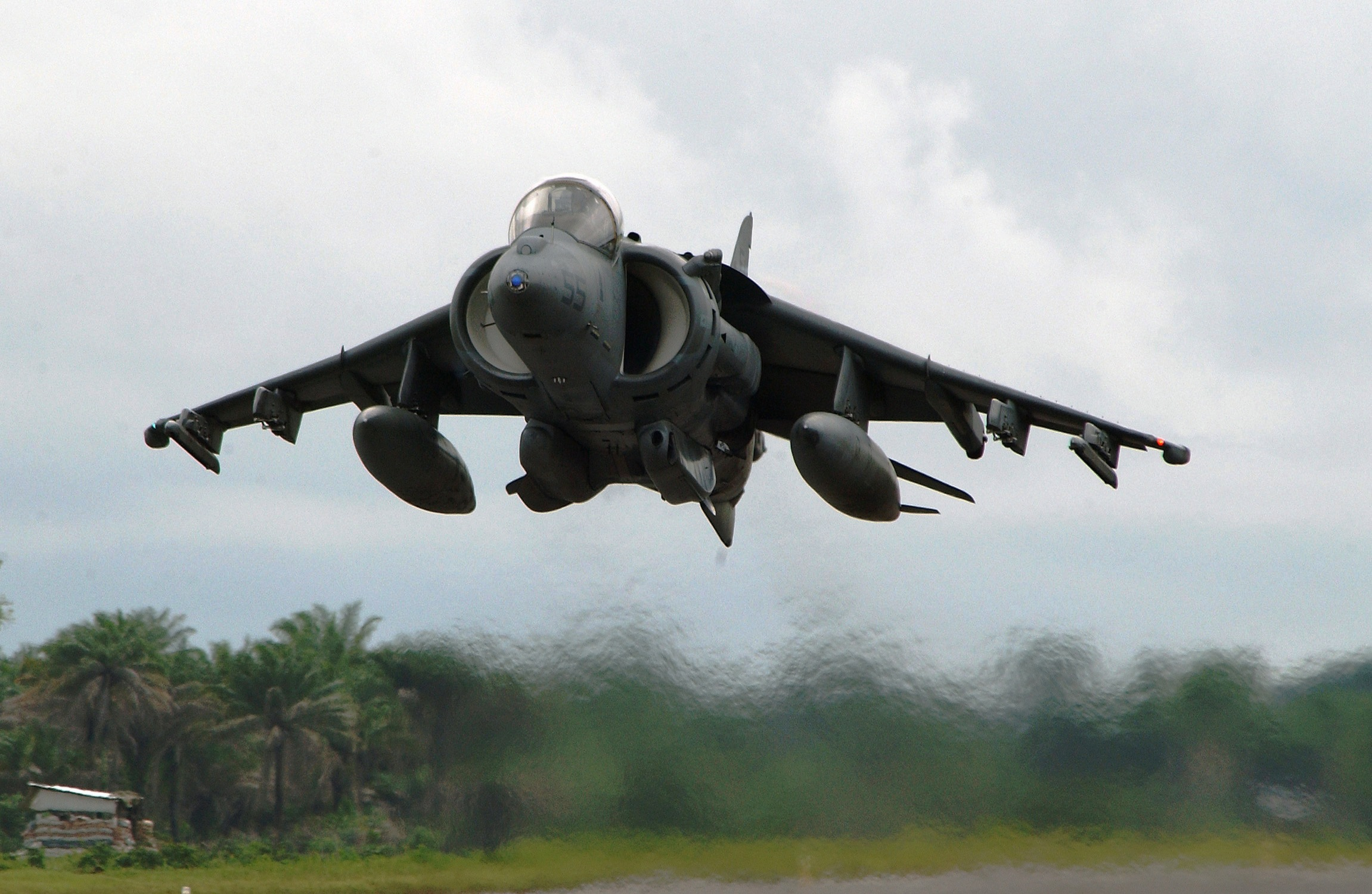
AV-8B of the 398th Air Expeditionary Group departing Sierra Leone as part of Joint Task Force Liberia, 2003

The 398th was redesignated as the 398th Operations Group and activated 1 June 1992. Reactivated in 1992 as 398th Operations Group. Assigned first to 340th Air Refueling Wing, later to 97th Air Mobility Wing as a KC-135 air refueling group. From 1 June 1992 – 31 March 1995 the 93d Air Refueling Squadron was part of the group. The 398th was inactivated on 31 March 1995.

=== JTF Liberia / OIF ===
Redesignated 398th Air Expeditionary Group on 18 March 2003, the group activated on 13 July 2003. During Operation Iraqi Freedom the 398th Air Expeditionary Group was given to a collection of units and personnel operating from Naval Support Activity Souda Bay, Greece. Colonel Marcelyn A. Atwood commanded the group.

In June 2003, the unit participated in Operation Shining Express in Liberia, a rescue operation directed by the United States European Command to evacuate civilians from parts of Liberia affected by the Second Liberian Civil War. Among the groups contributions was delivering a United States Marine Corps security forces team.

Supporting Joint Task Force Liberia, in mid-July 2003, EUCOM prepositioned the 398th Air Expeditionary Group to Freetown, Sierra Leone, and Dakar, Senegal to provide Task Force airlift and noncombatant evacuation of U.S. citizens in and around Monrovia. The 398th AEG was comprised of the 56th Rescue Squadron, 37th Airlift Squadron, 86th Aeromedical Evacuation Squadron, and 75th Airlift Squadron. EUCOM also placed SOF assets including the 67th Special Operations Squadron in neighboring countries.

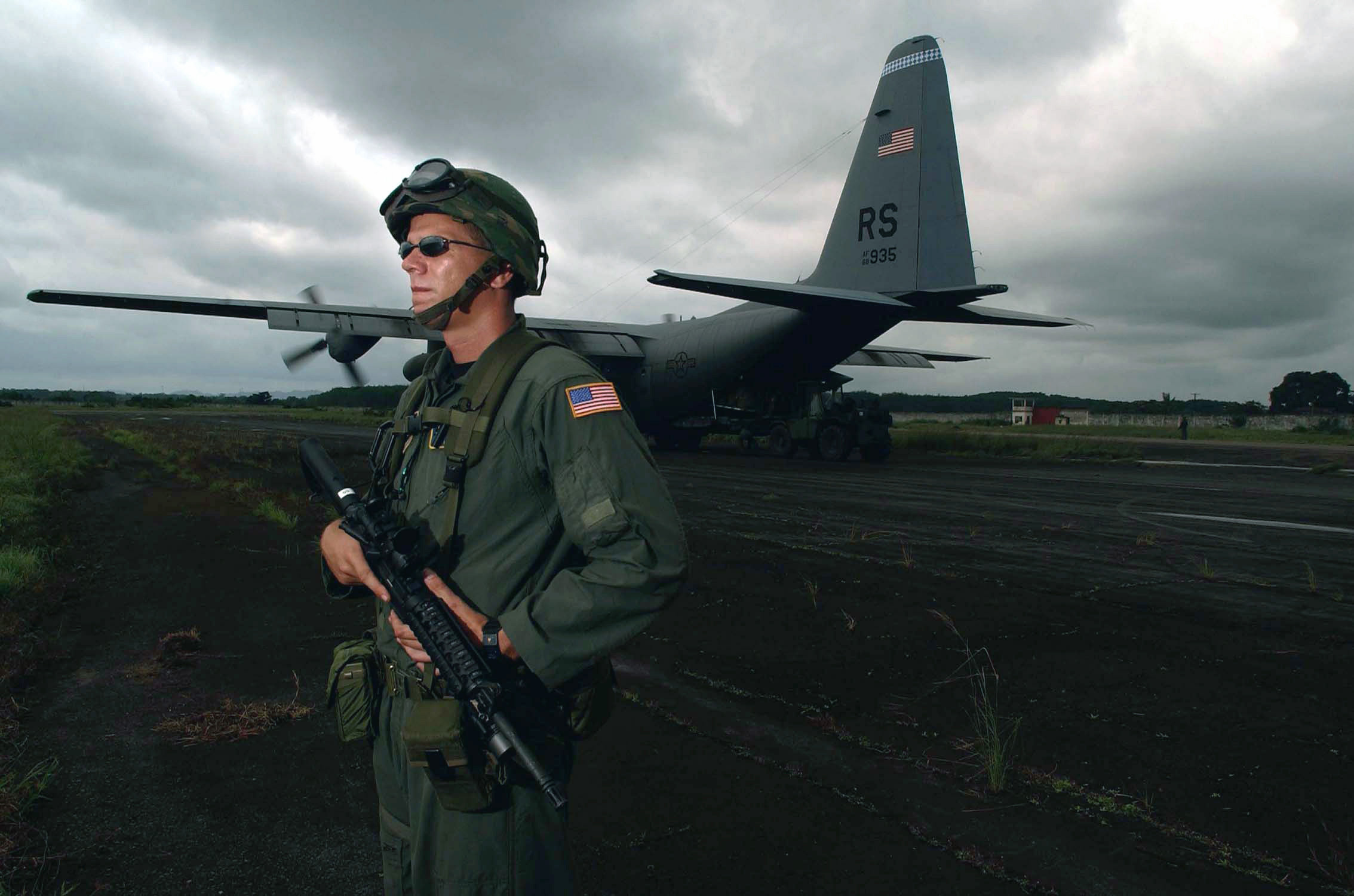
786th Security Forces Squadron "Ravens" provide security for a 37th Airlift Squadron, C-130E Hercules at Roberts International Airport in Monrovia, Liberia, 2003

From 23 March and 10 April 2008, the 398th with the 712th Expeditionary Air Refueling Squadron was deployed to the Budapest International Airport, assigned to the 323d Air Expeditionary Wing. It provided air refueling missions to fighters in support of Operation Noble Endeavor during the 2008 Bucharest summit.

== Lineage ==
- Constituted as the 398th Bombardment Group (Heavy) on 15 February 1943

Activated on 1 March 1943
Redesignated 398th Bombardment Group, Heavy c. 20 August 1943
Inactivated on 1 September 1945
Redesignated 398th Operations Group in 1992
Activated on 1 June 1992
Inactivated on 31 March 1995
Redesignated 398th Expeditionary Air Refueling Group and converted to provisional status on 5 February 2001
Redesignated 398th Air Expeditionary Group on 18 March 2003
Activated c. 13 July 2003
Inactivated on 8 October 2003
Activated in 2004
Inactivated on 17 June 2004
Activated on 25 March 2006
Inactivated on 8 April 2006
Activated on 14 March 2008
Inactivated on 30 April 2008

=== Assignments ===
- II Bomber Command, 1 March 1943 – 4 April 1944
- 1st Combat Bombardment Wing, 22 April 1944 – 22 June 1945
- III Bomber Command, 3 July - 1 September 1945
- 340th Air Refueling Wing, 1 June - 1 October 1992
- 97th Air Mobility Wing, 1 October 1992 – 31 March 1995
- United States Air Forces in Europe to activate or inactivate at any time after 5 February 2001

16th Air and Space Expeditionary Task Force, circa 16 April 2003
3d Expeditionary Air and Space Task Force, c. 13 July - 8 October 2003
Attached to Third Air Force, 2004 - 17 June 2004
Attached to Air Command Europe, 25 March - 8 April 2006
323d Air Expeditionary Wing, 14 March - 30 April 2008

=== Components ===
- 56th Expeditionary Rescue Squadron, c. 13 July - 8 October 2003
- 37th Airlift Squadron, c. 13 July - 8 October 2003
- 75th Airlift Squadron, c. 13 July - 8 October 2003
- 67th Special Operations Squadron, c. 13 July - 8 October 2003
- 86th Aeromedical Evacuation Squadron, c. 13 July - 8 October 2003
- 86th Aircraft Maintenance Squadron, c. 13 July - 8 October 2003
- 93d Air Refueling Squadron, 1 June 1992 - 31 March 1995
- 330th Flying Training Squadron, 1 June 1992 – 20 January 1994
- 600th Bombardment Squadron, 1 March 1943 - 1 September 1945
- 601st Bombardment Squadron, 1 March 1943 - 1 September 1945
- 602d Bombardment Squadron, 1 March 1943 - 1 September 1945
- 603d Bombardment Squadron, 1 March 1943 - 1 September 1945
- 712th Expeditionary Air Refueling Squadron, 18 March – 30 April 2008
- 772d Expeditionary Air Base Squadron, c. 13 July - 8 October 2003
- 786th Expeditionary Security Forces Squadron, c. 13 July - 8 October 2003

=== Stations ===
- Ephrata Army Air Base, Washington, 1 March 1943 (Note: Original edit says Bishop Army Airfield See discussionon talk page.)
- Blythe Army Air Base, California, 5 April 1943
- Geiger Field, Washington, 29 April 1943
- Rapid City Army Air Base, South Dakota, 10 June 1943 – 4 April 1944
- RAF Nuthampstead (AAF-131), England, 22 April 1944 – 26 May 1945
- Drew Field, Florida, 3 July - 1 September 1945
- Altus Air Force Base, Oklahoma, 1 June 1992 – 31 March 1995
- Naval Support Activity Souda Bay, Greece, circa 16 April 2003
- Lungi International Airport, Sierra Leone, 13 July 2003 - 8 October 2003
- Dakar, Senegal 2004 - 17 June 2004
- Tunis, Tunisia, 25 March - 8 April 2006
- Budapest Ferihengy International Airport, 14 March - 30 April 2008
