= RAF Nuthampstead =

Former RAF station in Hertfordshire, England

RAF Nuthampstead USAAF Station 131
- Near Royston, Hertfordshire in England
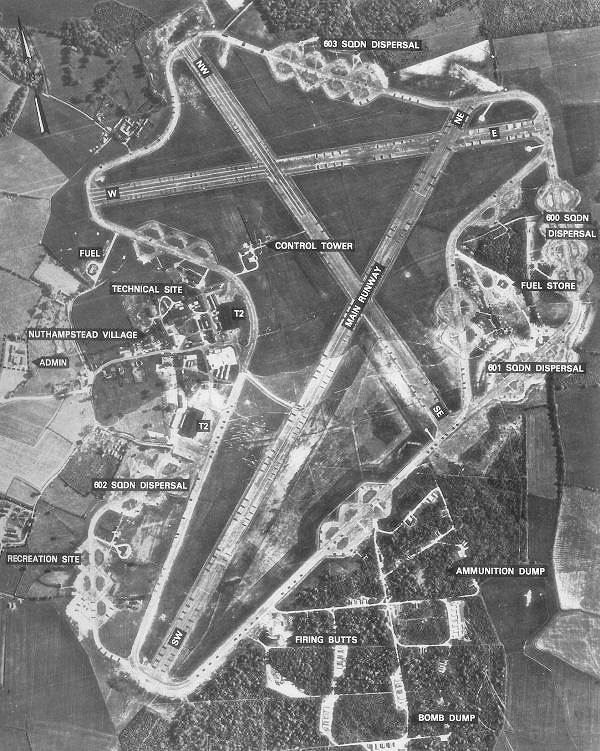
- Aerial Photo of Nuthampstead Airfield - 9 July 1946

Site information
- Type: Royal Air Force station
- Code: NT
- Owner: Air Ministry
- Operator: Royal Air Force; United States Army Air Forces
- Controlled by: RAF Maintenance Command; Eighth Air Force

Location
- Shown within Hertfordshire RAF Nuthampstead (the United Kingdom)
- Coordinates: 51.995°N 0.067°E

Site history
- Built: 1942
- In use: 1943-1954
- Battles/wars: European Theatre of World War II; Air Offensive, Europe July 1942 - May 1945

Airfield information
Runways
Direction	Length and surface
00/00
00/00
00/00

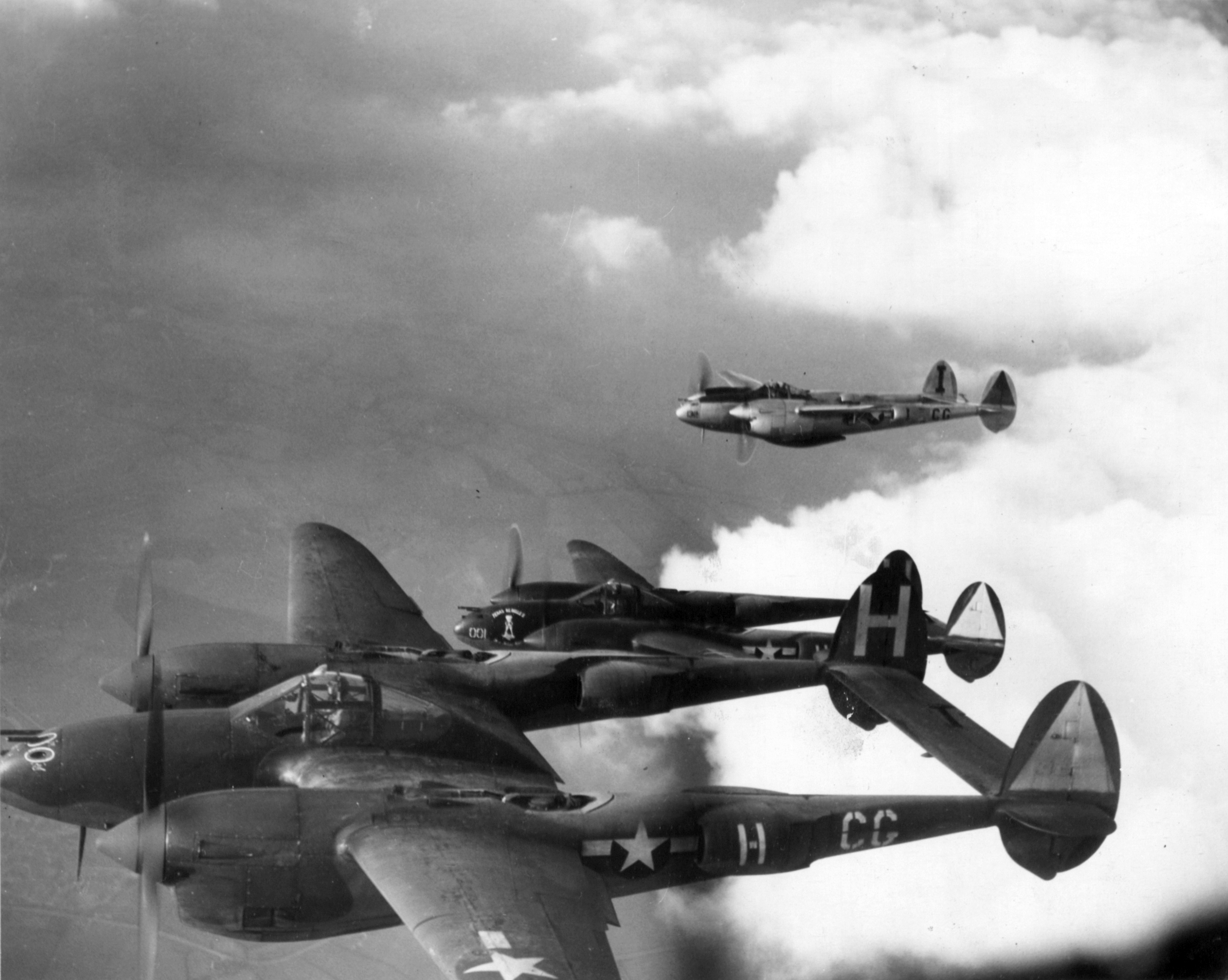
P-38Hs of the 38th Fighter Squadron.

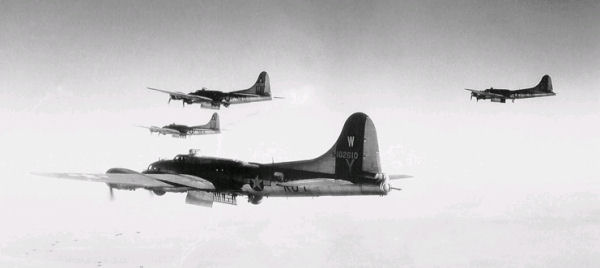
B-17Gs of the 398th Bomb Group over a target.

Royal Air Force Nuthampstead or more simply RAF Nuthampstead is a former Royal Air Force station in England. The airfield is located mostly in Hertfordshire between the villages of Nuthampstead and Anstey and the hamlet of Morrice Green in Hertfordshire and Langley, Lower Green and Clavering Park Wood in Essex. The eastern part of the airfield including part of the East-West Runway, the Fuel Store, the dispersal areas of 600 and 601 Squadrons and the northeastern perimeter track were all in Essex. RAF Nuthampstead is located four miles to the east of the A10 Hertford to Royston road.

== History ==
=== USAAF use ===
Construction began in 1942 with the facility being built by the 814th and 630th Engineer Battalions of the US Army for the United States Army Air Forces (USAAF) Eighth Air Force. Nuthampstead was assigned USAAF designation Station 131. Two T-2 hangars were constructed with the technical site consisting largely of Nissen huts were situated to the west of the airfield and dispersed within the small village of Nuthampstead.

During the construction of the airfield, rubble from the blitzed areas of East London and Coventry were used for the foundations and even today, farmers occasionally turn up bricks still bearing fragments of their original wallpaper or paintwork or perhaps the remains of a wall light switch still attached.

==== 55th Fighter Group ====
Although the airfield was built to accommodate heavy bombers, from September 1943 until April 1944 the 55th Fighter Group used the airfield, arriving from McChord AAF Washington on 14 September 1943. The group was under the command of the 67th Fighter Wing of the VIII Fighter Command. Aircraft of the 55th were identified by a green/yellow checkerboard pattern around their cowlings.

The group consisted of the following squadrons:

- 38th Fighter Squadron (CG)
- 338th Fighter Squadron (CL)
- 343d Fighter Squadron (CY)

The 55th FG began operations with Lockheed P-38H Lightnings on 15 October 1943, and was the first to use these aircraft on long-range escort missions from the UK. The P-38H differed from earlier versions in being powered by 1425 hp Allison V-1710-89/91 engines.

The Lightnings' engines were troubled by the addition of alcohol used as an anti-knock compound in their fuel supply; a British war economy solution which caused problems with water condensation on the ground and fuel line icing at altitude. Another British attempt to correct fuel composition caused lead metal deposits to coat cylinders and foul plugs throughout the squadron. The -H series Lightnings did not have adequate cooling for extended high-power usage, as their engine development had outstripped the cooling capacity of the integral intercooler which ran through the wing's leading edge. Pilots were instructed to restrict their periods of highest engine power to defined time limits, but many did not. As a result of these various influences, the Group's Lightnings suffered a high rate of attrition. Nevertheless, 55FG P-38H pilots provided cover for missions against aircraft plants during Big Week in February 1944. Lt. Col. Jack Jenkins led the group on 3 March 1944, when they became the first Allied fighters to reach Berlin on an escort mission.

On 16 April 1944 the group moved to RAF Wormingford in Essex to accommodate the arrival of the 398th Bomb Group. The 55FG converted to North American P-51D Mustangs in July 1944, continuing their primary task of escorting Boeing B-17 Flying Fortress and Consolidated B-24 Liberator bombers that attacked such targets as industries and marshalling yards in Germany, and airfields and V-weapon sites in France.

==== 398th Bombardment Group (Heavy) ====
From April 1944 until June 1945 the 398th Bombardment Group (Heavy) used the airfield, arriving from Rapid City AAF South Dakota. The group was under the command of the 1st Combat Bombardment Wing of the 1st Air Division. Equipped with Boeing B-17G Flying Fortresses, its tail code was a "Triangle-W".

The group consisted of the following squadrons:

- 600th Bombardment Squadron (N8)
- 601st Bombardment Squadron (3O)
- 602d Bombardment Squadron (K8)
- 603d Bombardment Squadron (N7)

The 398th BG entered combat in May 1944, and until V-E Day operated primarily against strategic objectives in Germany, attacking targets such as factories in Berlin, warehouses in Munich, marshalling yards in Saarbrücken, shipping facilities in Kiel, oil refineries in Merseburg, and aircraft plants in Münster.

The group temporarily suspended strategic missions to attack coastal defenses and enemy troops on the Cherbourg peninsula during the Invasion of Normandy in June 1944. The group struck gun positions near Eindhoven in support of the air attack on the Netherlands in September 1944, and raided power stations, railroads, and bridges during the Battle of the Bulge, December 1944-January 1945. A formation of 38 aircraft from this group were responsible for the mistaken Bombing of Prague on 14 February 1945. The group flew missions attacking airfields to aid the Allied assault across the Rhine in March 1945.

The 398th flew its last combat mission, attacking an airfield in Pilsen, Czechoslovakia, on 25 April 1945. After V-E Day the group transported liberated prisoners from Germany to France.

From Nuthampstead, the 398th Bomb Group flew 195 combat missions losing 58 B17C Flying Fortresses. The unit returned to Drew AAF Florida and was inactivated on 1 September 1945.

=== RAF Maintenance Command use ===
With the departure of the 398th, Nuthampstead was transferred from the USAAF to RAF Maintenance Command on 10 July 1945. The airfield was used as an ordnance store until being placed under care and maintenance on 30 October 1954. Nuthampstead was finally closed on 1 March 1959.

No. 94 Maintenance Unit RAF and No. 95 MU RAF were here at some point.

== Current use ==
With the end of military control, the concrete hardstands and most of the perimeter track were removed for hardcore to construct the London to Leeds motorway M1 motorway, with single-lane farm access roads being retained for agricultural use. Most of the runways were also removed for aggregate, however a small end of the west secondary runway was converted for go-kart racing and the northeast end of the main runway was converted to a grass landing strip for small crop-spraying aircraft. Many of the former airfield technical site buildings are in use by private companies.

The Forestry Commission planted a large area of conifers to the southeast of the airfield, on the location of the former bomb storage site. During the programme, a large number of abandoned ordnance was found and the site was declared unsafe. For several months, RAF bomb disposal teams recovered the wartime ordnance before the forestation program was completed.

In the late 1960s, Nuthampstead was one of the sites considered for London's third airport, but it was ultimately rejected.

Nuthampstead is the site of the Barkway (BKY) VOR air navigational beacon, at one time the holding "stack" for Stansted and Luton airports.

== See also ==
- List of former Royal Air Force stations
