= 86th Aeromedical Evacuation Squadron =

86th Aeromedical Evacuation Squadron

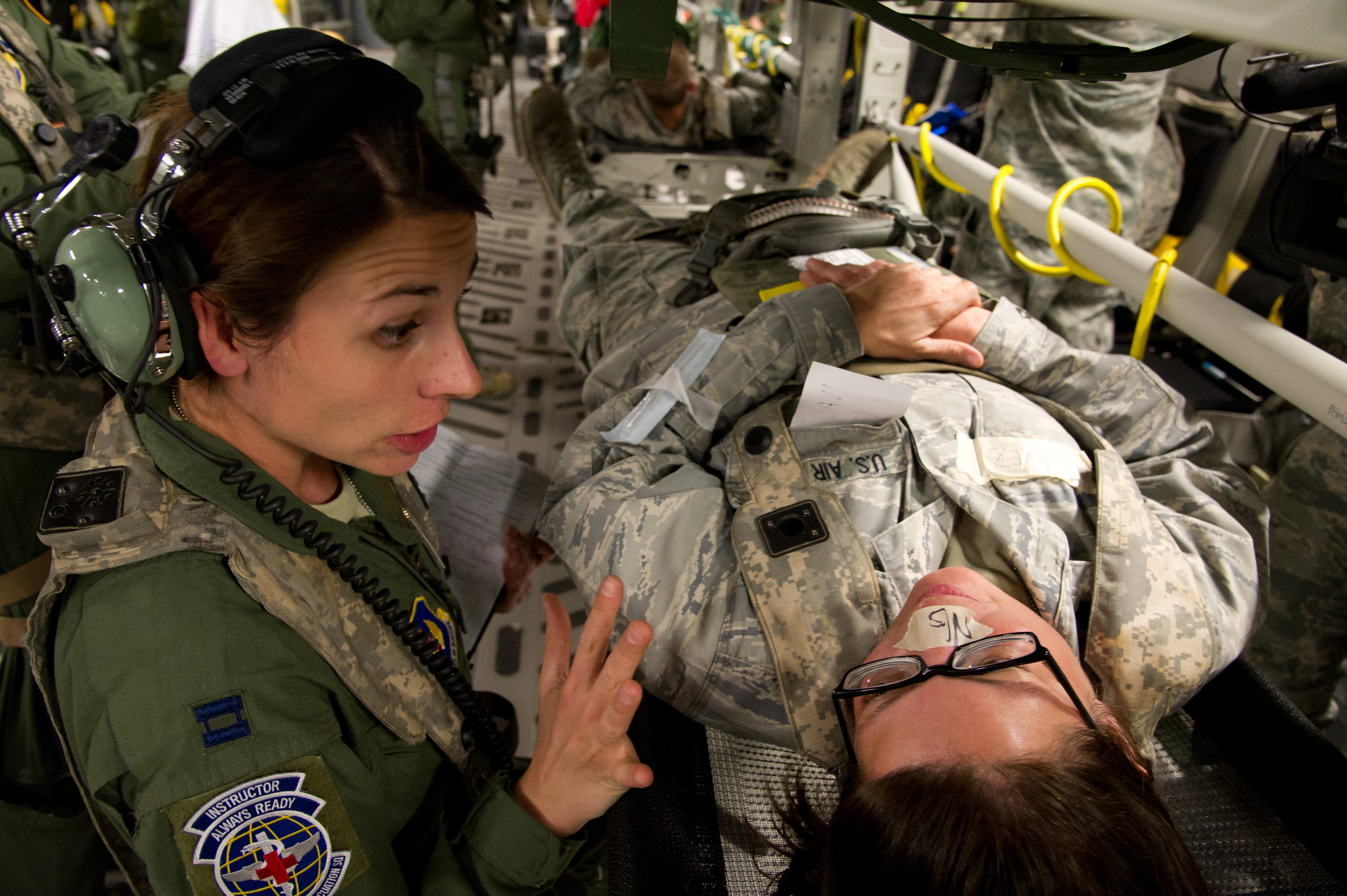
- An 86th AES flight nurse cares for a simulated patient during an exercise in 2014
- Active: 1994–present
- Country: United States
- Branch: United States Air Force
- Type: Aeromedical evacuation
- Part of: United States Air Forces in Europe – Air Forces Africa: Third Air Force; 86th Airlift Wing; 86th Operations Group
- Garrison/HQ: Ramstein Air Base, Germany
- Motto: Always Ready
- Decorations: Air Force Outstanding Unit Award with Combat "V" Device; Air Force Outstanding Unit Award (11x)

Insignia
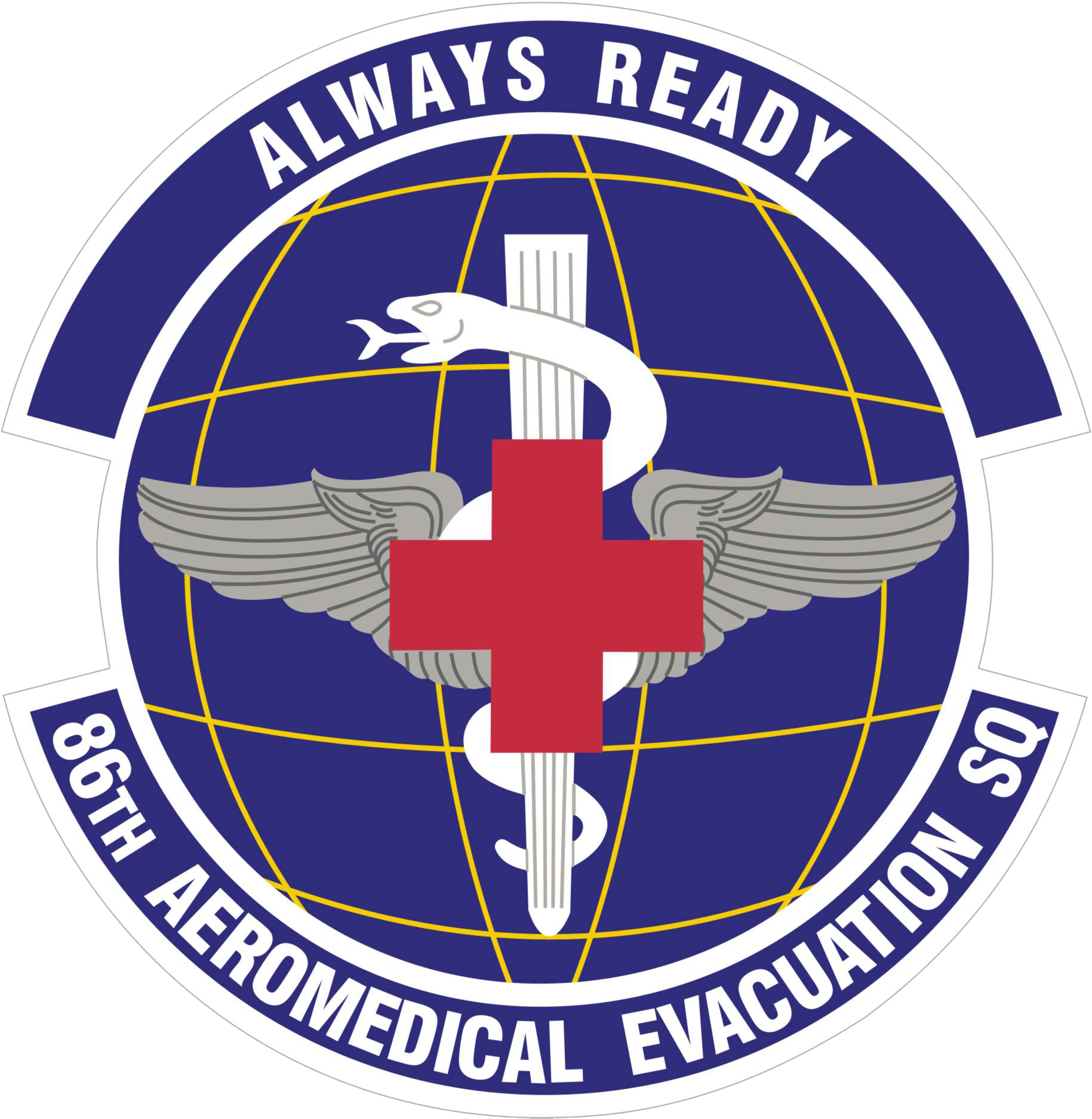
- 86th Aeromedical Evacuation Squadron emblem

The 86th Aeromedical Evacuation Squadron (86 AES) is a unit of the United States Air Force. It is part of the 86th Operations Group, 86th Airlift Wing at Ramstein Air Base, Germany. It is a component of Third Air Force and United States Air Forces Europe.

The 86 AES provides operational aeromedical evacuation for U.S. troops in the United States European Command and United States Africa Command areas of responsibility using, primarily, Boeing C-17 Globemaster III, Boeing KC-135 Stratotanker, Gates Learjet C-21A and Lockheed Martin C-130J Super Hercules aircraft.

The squadron was constituted as the 86 Aeromedical Evacuation Squadron on 27 May 1994, and activated on 16 August 1994.

The unit is composed of Flight Nurses, Medical Service Corps officers and Aeromedical Evacuation Technicians, as well as medical administration and logistics technicians.

== History ==
Major operations the squadron has participated in include:

- Operation Enduring Freedom
- Operation Iraqi Freedom
- Operation Unified Protector
- Operation Unified Response
- Operation Joint Endeavor
- Operation Allied Force

The 86 AES provided AE coverage for deployed US and NATO forces. This included the airlift of former prisoners of war Specialist Steven Gonzales and Staff Sergeants Christopher Stone and Andrew Ramirez, to Ramstein Air Base, Germany, from Zagreb, Croatia. They had been captured by Serbian forces while patrolling in the Republic of Macedonia, during Operation Allied Force.

- Operation Deliberate Force
- Bombing of USS Cole

On October 12, 2000, crew from the 86 Aeromedical Evacuation Squadron and CCATT team members from Landstuhl Regional Medical launched on C-9 Nightingales from the 75th Airlift Squadron to Djibouti and Yemen. In total 28 Sailors were airlifted back to definitive care in Germany by 14 October 2000.

- Bombing of the Khobar Towers

== Partnership Building ==
Since it is uniquely situated among active duty USAF AE units, the 86 AES participates regularly in partnership building visits with allied nations.

- Poland
- Germany
- Norway
- Tunisia

== Lineage ==
- Constituted as the 86th Aeromedical Evacuation Squadron on 27 May 1994

Activated on 16 August 1994

=== Assignments ===
- 86th Operations Group, 16 August 1994 – present

=== Stations ===
- Ramstein Air Base, Germany, 16 August 1994 – present

== Major Unit Awards ==
- Mackay Trophy
- Air Mobility Rodeo 2009 - Best Aeromedical Evacuation Team

== Historical Unit Patches ==
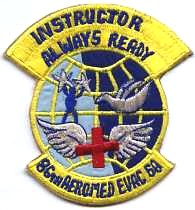
Historical Instructor Patch For 86 AES
