= Sottevast =

- Commune
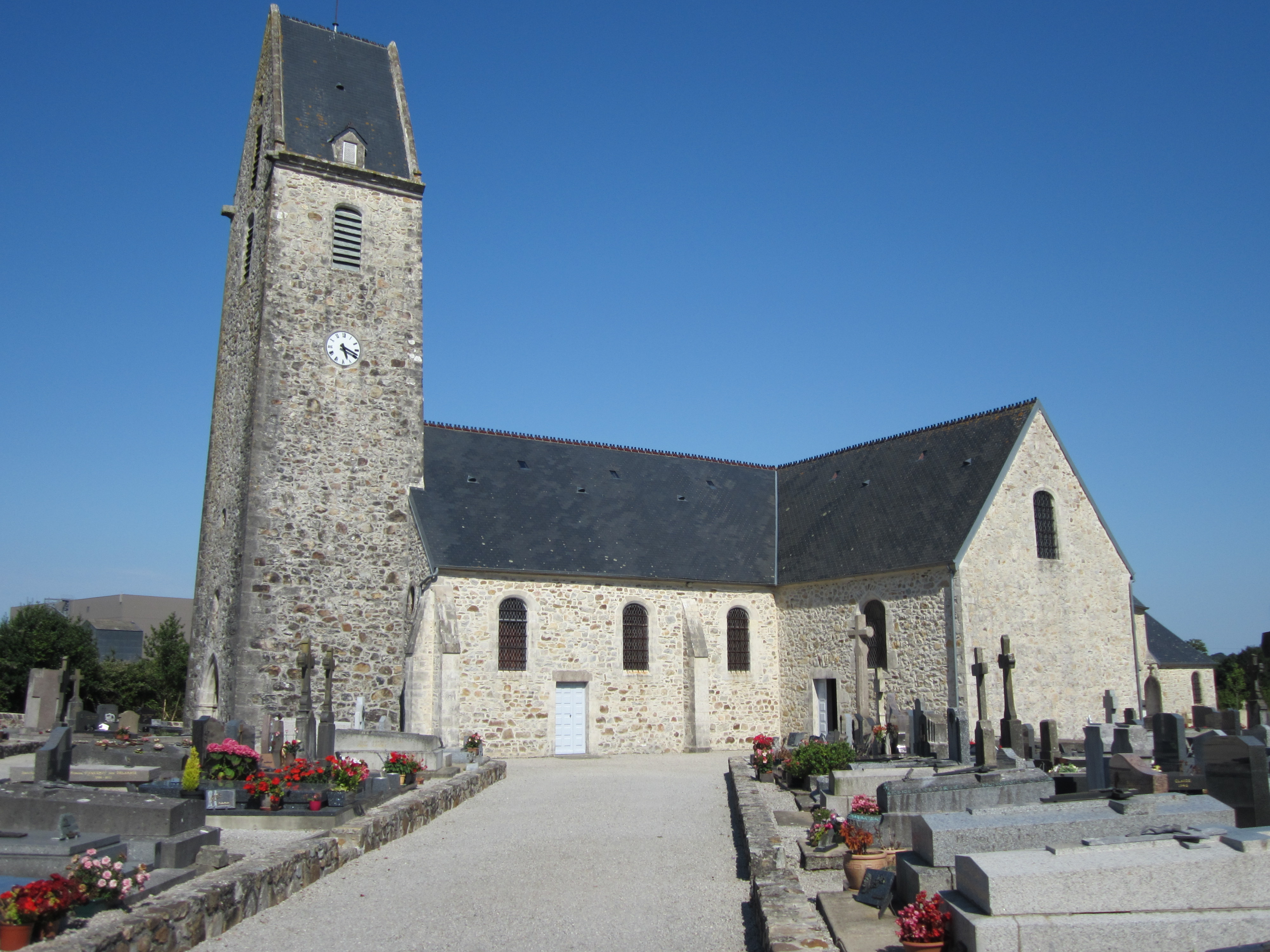
- The church of Saint-Hermeland
- Location of Sottevast
- Location within France Location within Normandy
- Coordinates: 49°31′25″N 1°35′35″W
- Country: France
- Region: Normandy
- Department: Manche
- Arrondissement: Cherbourg
- Canton: Bricquebec-en-Cotentin
- Intercommunality: CA Cotentin

Government
  - Mayor (2020–2026): Jean-Pierre Tollemer
- Area^{1}: 10.82 km^{2} (4.18 sq mi)
- Elevation: 46 m (151 ft)
- Population (2023): 1,459
  - Density: 134.8/km^{2} (349.2/sq mi)
- Time zone: UTC+01:00 (CET)
  - Summer (DST): UTC+02:00 (CEST)
- INSEE/Postal code: 50579 /50260
- ^{1} French Land Register data, which excludes lakes, ponds, glaciers > 1 km^{2} (0.386 sq mi or 247 acres) and river estuaries.

Sottevast
- Part of Nazi Germany
- France

Site information
- Type: bunker

Location
- Coordinates: 49°33′0.54″N 1°35′35.15″W

Site history
- In use: captured before being used
- Battles/wars: Operation Crossbow

Sottevast (French pronunciation: [sɔtva]) is a commune in Normandy in north-western France.

== Sottevast in World War II ==
During World War II, there was a German storage and servicing bunker for V-weapons near Sottevast. The site was captured by the 504th Parachute Infantry Regiment of the 82nd Airborne Division during the Normandy campaign.
