= 552d Training Squadron =

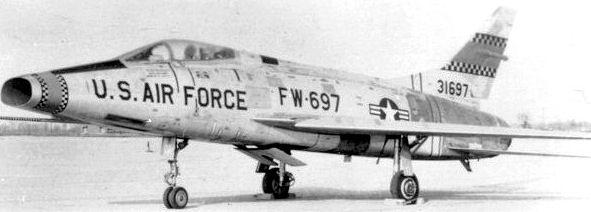
- F-100 Super Sabre of the 386th Fighter-Bomber Group (Note: Aircraft is North American F-100A-20-NA Super Sabre, serial 53-1697, taken at Bunker Hill AFB. This plane crashed at Nellis AFB on 20 July 1957. Baugher, Joe (10 April 2023). "1957 USAF Serial Numbers". Joe Baugher.)
- Active: 1942–1945; 1956–1957; 1984–present
- Country: United States
- Branch: United States Air Force
- Role: Flying training
- Part of: Air Combat Command
- Garrison/HQ: Tinker AFB, Oklahoma
- Engagements: European Theater of Operations
- Decorations: Distinguished Unit Citation; Air Force Meritorious Unit Award; Air Force Outstanding Unit Award with Combat "V" Device; Air Force Outstanding Unit Award

Insignia
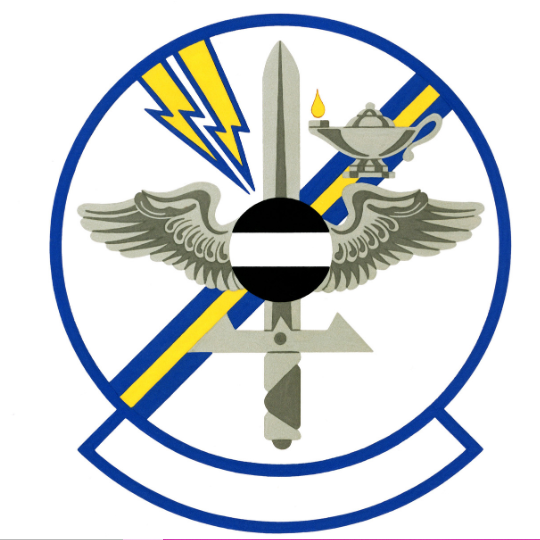
- 552 Training Sq emblem (Note: Approved c. 1995)

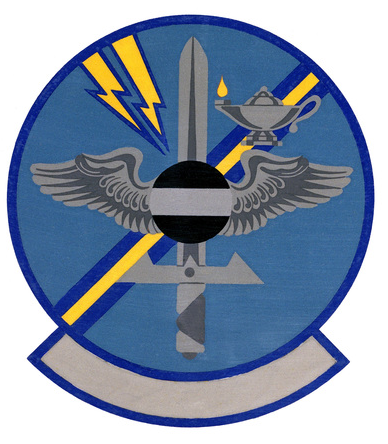
- 552 Tactical Training Sq emblem

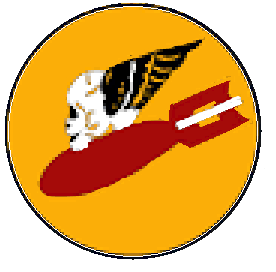
- 552d Bombardment Squadron emblem (Note: Approved 17 April 1943. Description: On a yellow disc, thin border back, piped white, a skull winged of black, resting on a red aerial bomb falling to dexter base)
- World War II fuselage code: RG

The 552d Training Squadron is a United States Air Force unit assigned to the 552d Operations Group at Tinker Air Force Base, Oklahoma. The squadron trains aircrew for airborne warning and control missions on the Boeing E-3 Sentry aircraft.

The squadron was first activated during World War II as the 552d Bombardment Squadron. After training in the United States, it deployed to European Theater of Operations, where it participated in the campaign against Germany. It earned a Distinguished Unit Citation for its missions flown in preparation for the invasion of France. It returned to the United States following V-E Day and was inactivated.

Active again from 1956 to 1957, the squadron, designated the 552d Fighter-Bomber Squadron, flew North American F-100 Super Sabres at Bunker Hill Air Force Base, Indiana.

== Mission ==
The squadron provides academic and simulator training for all Boeing E-3 Sentry crew members. It also acts as the administrative student squadron for all E-3 aircrew members in training. It trains over 400 aircrew annually.

== History ==
=== World War II ===
The squadron was first activated at MacDill Field, Florida in December 1942 as the 552d Bombardment Squadron, one of the four original squadrons of the 386th Bombardment Group. After training at MacDill and Lake Charles Army Air Field, Louisiana with the Martin B-26 Marauder, it departed for the European Theater of Operations in early May 1943. The ground echelon sailed on the RMS Queen Elizabeth on 27 May, while the air echelon ferried their Marauders to Europe via both the North Atlantic and South Atlantic ferry routes.

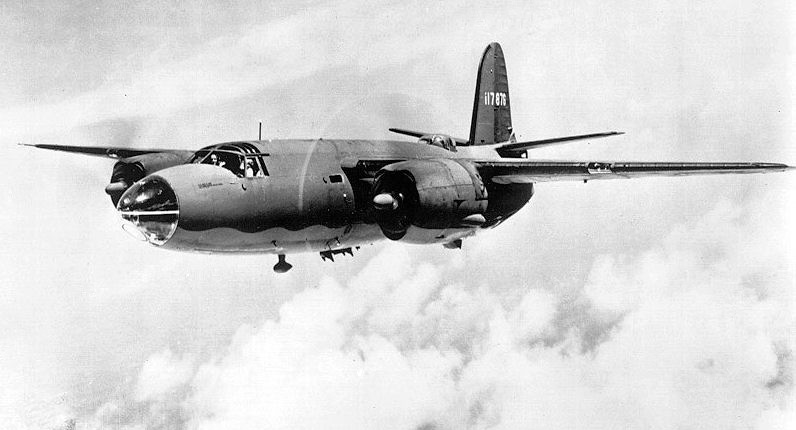
552 BS Martin B-26 Marauder (Note: Aircraft is Martin B-26B-2 Marauder, serial 41-27876.)

Upon arrival in England, the squadron was stationed at RAF Snetterton Heath. However, Eighth Air Force had decided to transfer its B-26 units from VIII Bomber Command to VIII Air Support Command and move them to stations closer to the European continent, so a week after its arrival, the squadron moved to RAF Boxted. This move also put the squadron's base in an area where it was planned to locate a future tactical air force. The squadron's entry into combat was delayed by the fact that its training in the United States had concentrated on low level attacks, while Eighth Air Force had determined to use the Marauders in medium level attacks to avoid light flak. This required additional training. Although some diversionary missions were flown, the squadron did not fly its first combat mission, an attack on Woensdrecht Airfield, until 30 July.

During its first month of combat, the squadron concentrated on attacks on enemy air bases, although it also attacked gun positions and marshalling yards. In an effort to improve accuracy, the squadron participated in the 386th Group's first use of "drop on leader" tactics and revised formations in the European Theater on 2 September. On 24 September 1943, this and the other squadrons of the 386th Bomb Group moved to Great Dunmow, the Army Air Forces station for which it is best known. The squadron flew its last mission as part of the Eighth Air Force on 8 October when it attacked an airfield near Lille.

Shortly after, all British-based B-26 Marauder units were transferred to the tactical Ninth Air Force. The 552d BS and its fellow 386th BG squadrons began participating in an extensive campaign against V-1 flying bomb and V-2 rocket sites in Operation Crossbow. During Big Week, the squadron attacked airfields in Belgium and the Netherlands to weaken enemy air defenses against the heavy bombers striking the German aircraft industry in Operation Pointblank. In preparation for Operation Overlord, the invasion of the continent, it attacked airfields, marshalling yards and gun positions. In late May, just before the landings, it concentrated on bombing bridges across the Seine to interfere with possible enemy reinforcement of the landing areas. On D-Day it hit coastal defenses, and during the fighting in Normandy, struck fuel and supply depots, lines of communication and enemy positions.

The squadron provided air support for Allied forces attacking Caen and on 25 July supported Operation Cobra, the breakout at Saint Lo. For its efforts against enemy opposition since entering combat the previous summer, the squadron was awarded the Distinguished Unit Citation. During August, the squadron supported ground forces closing the Falaise gap to prevent surrounded German forces from escaping. September saw the squadron conducting attacks in the area of Brest.

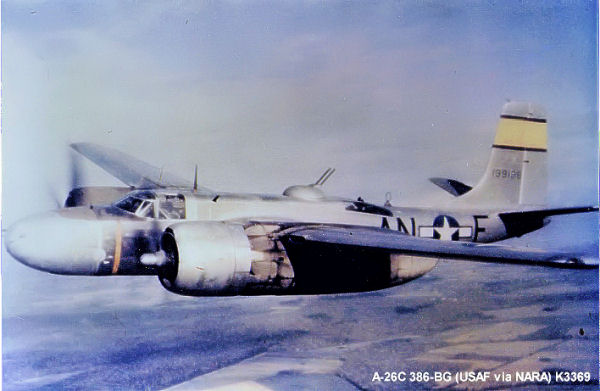
386th Bomb Group Douglas A-26C Invader

In October, the squadron moved to Beaumont-sur-Oise Airfield, an advanced landing ground in France to be closer to allied forces advancing through northern Europe. From its location on the continent, it attacked Metz, targets in the Netherlands, and depots and defended areas in Germany. During the Battle of the Bulge in December 1944 and January 1945, it concentrated on attacks on bridges.

Shortly after the fighting in the Ardennes, the squadron was withdrawn from combat to convert from the Marauder to the Douglas A-26 Invader. It flew missions with its new plane from Sint-Truiden Airfield, Belgium through May 1945. The squadron's last mission was on 3 May, an attack on the Stod Ammunition Plant in Czechoslovakia. After V-E Day the squadron remained in Belgium until July, when it returned to the United States, inactivating at Westover Field, Massachusetts on 7 November 1945.

=== Tactical fighter operations ===
The squadron was redesignated the 552d Fighter-Bomber Squadron and activated at Bunker Hill Air Force Base, Indiana in April 1956, as Tactical Air Command (TAC) expanded its fighter complement there from one to two groups. The squadron initially equipped with the North American F-86 Sabre before finally beginning to receive North American F-100 Super Sabres in 1957, apparently the only squadron in the group to receive the new fighter. However, the Air Force had decided to use Bunker Hill as a Strategic Air Command (SAC) medium bomber base and the squadron began to phase down its activities in May 1957 and was inactivated in July 1957 along with its parent 386th Group in preparation for the transfer of the base from TAC to SAC.

=== Airborne warning and control training ===
The squadron was designated the 552d Tactical Training Squadron and activated at Tinker Air Force Base. Oklahoma on 1 January 1984. It currently has over 80 instructors and a dozen support personnel assigned. About half of its instructors are contractors. The remaining USAF instructors maintain readiness to support tactical deployments in addition to their instructor duties. In November 1991, the squadron dropped the "tactical" from its name.

== Lineage ==
- Constituted as the 552d Bombardment Squadron (Medium) on 25 November 1942

Activated on 1 December 1942
Redesignated 552d Bombardment Squadron, Medium on 9 October 1944
Redesignated 552d Bombardment Squadron, Light on 23 June 1945
Inactivated on 7 November 1945

- Redesignated 552d Fighter-Bomber Squadron on 31 October 1955

Activated on 8 April 1956
Inactivated on 8 July 1957

- Redesignated 552d Tactical Training Squadron

Activated on 1 January 1984
Redesignated 552d Training Squadron on 1 November 1991

=== Assignments ===
- 386th Bombardment Group, 1 December 1942 – 7 November 1945
- 386th Fighter-Bomber Group, 8 April 1956 – 8 July 1957
- 552d Airborne Warning and Control Division (later 552d Airborne Warning and Control Wing, 552d Air Control Wing), 1 October 1984
- 552d Operations Group, 29 May 1992
- 552d Training Group, c. 17 August 2018 – present

=== Stations ===
- MacDill Field, Florida, 1 December 1942
- Lake Charles Army Air Field, Louisiana, 8 February-8 May 1943
- RAF Snetterton Heath (AAF-138), England, 3 June 1943
- RAF Boxted (AAF-150), England, 10 June 1943
- RAF Great Dunmow (AAF-164), England, 24 September 1943
- Beaumont-sur-Oise Airfield (A-60), France 2 October 1944
- Sint-Truiden Airfield (A-92), Belgium, 9 April–27 July 1945
- Seymour Johnson Field, North Carolina, 13 August 1945
- Westover Field, Massachusetts, 30 September–7 November 1945
- Bunker Hill Air Force Base, Indiana, 8 April 1956 – 8 July 1957
- Tinker Air Force Base. Oklahoma, 1 January 1984 – present

=== Aircraft ===
- Martin B-26 Marauder, 1942–1945
- Douglas A-26 Invader, 1945
- North American F-86 Sabre, 1956–1957
- North American F-100 Super Sabre, 1957

=== Awards and campaigns ===
Award streamer	Award	Dates	Notes
	Distinguished Unit Citation	30 July 1943-30 July 1944	552d Bombardment Squadron
	Air Force Meritorious Unit Award	1 June 2006-31 May 2007	552d Training Squadron
	Air Force Outstanding Unit Award with Combat "V" Device	1 June 2002-31 May 2003	552d Training Squadron
	Air Force Outstanding Unit Award	1 January 1984-30 June 1984	552d Tactical Training Squadron
	Air Force Outstanding Unit Award	1 May 1985-30 April 1987	552d Tactical Training Squadron
	Air Force Outstanding Unit Award	1 December 1989-1 December 1991	552d Tactical Training Squadron (later 552d Training Squadron)
	Air Force Outstanding Unit Award	1 April 1992-31 March 1994	552d Training Squadron
	Air Force Outstanding Unit Award	1 June 1994-31 May 1996	552d Training Squadron
	Air Force Outstanding Unit Award	1 June 1996-31 May 1998	552d Training Squadron
	Air Force Outstanding Unit Award	1 June 1998-31 May 2000	552d Training Squadron
	Air Force Outstanding Unit Award	1 June 2001-31 May 2002	552d Training Squadron
	Air Force Outstanding Unit Award	1 June 2003-31 May 2004	552d Training Squadron
	Air Force Outstanding Unit Award	1 June 2007-31 May 2008	552d Training Squadron
	Air Force Outstanding Unit Award	1 June 2012-31 May 2013	552d Training Squadron

Campaign Streamer	Campaign	Dates	Notes
	Air Offensive, Europe	3 June 1943–5 June 1944	552d Bombardment Squadron
	Air Combat, EAME Theater	3 June 1943–11 May 1945	552d Bombardment Squadron
	Northern France	25 July 1944–14 September 1944	552d Bombardment Squadron
	Rhineland	15 September 1944–21 March 1945	552d Bombardment Squadron
	Ardennes-Alsace	16 December 1944–25 January 1945	552d Bombardment Squadron
	Central Europe	22 March 1944–21 May 1945	552d Bombardment Squadron

== See also ==
- List of F-86 Sabre units
- List of F-100 units of the United States Air Force
- List of A-26 Invader operators
- List of Martin B-26 Marauder operators
