= RAF Snetterton Heath =

Former RAF Station in Norfolk, England

RAF Snetterton Heath USAAF Station 138
- Attleborough, Norfolk, in England
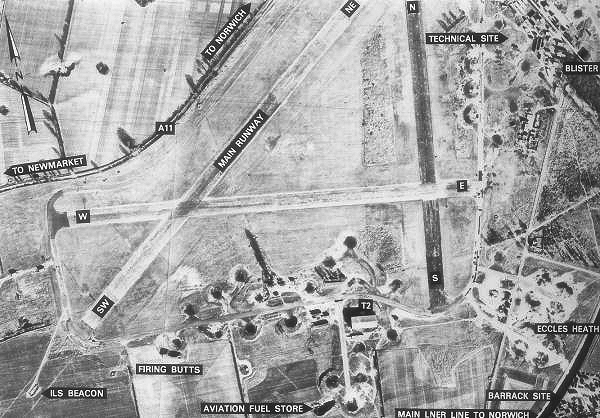
- Aerial photo of Snetterton Heath airfield – 5 February 1946

Site information
- Type: Royal Air Force station
- Code: SN
- Owner: Air Ministry
- Operator: Royal Air Force; United States Army Air Forces
- Controlled by: Eighth Air Force; RAF Maintenance Command

Location
- Location in Norfolk
- Coordinates: 52.47°N 0.96°E

Site history
- Built: 1942
- Built by: Taylor Woodrow Ltd
- In use: 1943–1948
- Battles/wars: European Theatre of World War II; Air Offensive, Europe July 1942 - May 1945

Garrison information
- Garrison: 386th Bombardment Group (Medium); 96th Bombardment Group

Airfield information
Runways
Direction	Length and surface
00/00	1,828 metres (5,997 ft) Concrete
00/00	1,280 metres (4,199 ft) Concrete
00/00	1,280 metres (4,199 ft) Concrete

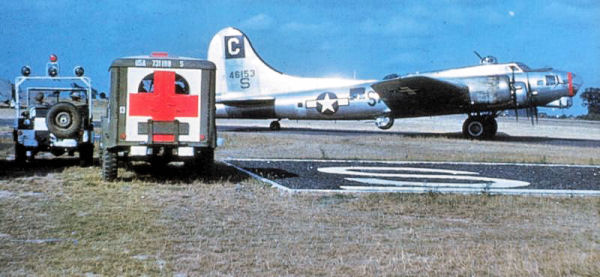
Lockheed/Vega B-17F-50-VE Fortress Serial 42–6153. This aircraft survived the war and was sent to RFC Kingman 30 October 1945.

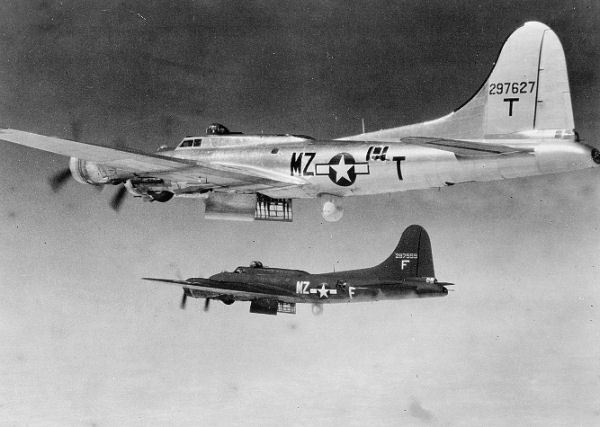
Lockheed/Vega B-17G-20-VE Fortress of the 413th Bomb Squadron. Serial 42-97627 is in foreground.

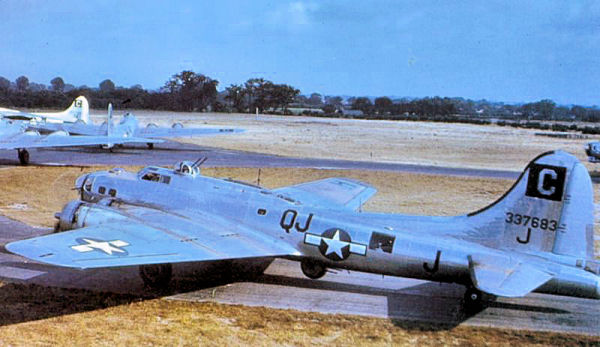
Boeing B-17G-70-BO Fortress Serial 43-37683 of the 339th Bomb Squadron

Royal Air Force Snetterton Heath or more simply RAF Snetterton Heath is a former Royal Air Force station located south east of the A11, 6 miles (9.7 km) south west of Attleborough, Norfolk, England.

== History ==
Snetterton Heath airfield was constructed by Taylor Woodrow Ltd., in 1942 at a cost of £950,000 to Class-A specifications. The main runway was 6,000 feet long with two secondaries of 4,200 feet each. Originally thirty-six hardstands of the "frying pan" type were constructed as when work started, the base was intended for Royal Air Force (RAF) use. When rescheduled for the United States Army Air Forces (USAAF), the number was increased to fifty, all of them being on the south and eastern side of the airfield as a railway line and the A11 road restricted dispersed locations. Total area of concrete laid in its construction was 530,000 square yards with storage provided for 144,000 gallons of fuel.

=== USAAF use ===
The airfield was allocated for USAAF use in 1943. Its USAAF designation was Station 138, Station-ID "SN". At one stage, it was planned to add an air depot, known as Eccles on the northern side of the airfield, access being across the A11. Four additional T-2 hangars were constructed on this site. Apparently a reduction in the number of heavy bombers being sent to the UK led to this depot becoming surplus to Eighth Air Force requirements and construction was stopped before all facilities were completed.

From 13 September 1943 though 18 June 1945, Snetterton Heath served as headquarters for the 45th Combat Bombardment Wing of the 3rd Bomb Division.

==== 386th Bombardment Group (Medium) ====
The airfield was used by the United States Army Air Forces Eighth Air Force 386th Bombardment Group (Medium), which arrived at Snetterton Heath from Lake Charles AAB, Louisiana, on 3 June 1943. The 386th Bomb Group was assigned to the 3rd Bombardment Wing and flew Martin B-26B/C Marauder twin-engine medium bombers.

Its operational squadrons were:

- 552d Bombardment Squadron (RG)
- 553d Bombardment Squadron (AN)
- 554th Bombardment Squadron (RU)
- 555th Bombardment Squadron (YA)

The group remained at Snetterton Heath only a few days, being transferred to RAF Boxted on 10 June 1943 in north Essex where B-26 groups were to be established for operations.

==== 96th Bombardment Group (Heavy) ====
The 96th Bombardment Group (Heavy) arrived on 12 June 1943 from RAF Andrews Field. The 96th was assigned to the 45th Combat Bombardment Wing (later, 45th Air Division), and the group tail code was a "Square-C".

Its operational squadrons were:

- 337th Bombardment Squadron (AW)
- 338th Bombardment Squadron (BX)
- 339th Bombardment Squadron (QJ)
- 413th Bombardment Squadron (MZ)

The group flew Boeing B-17 Flying Fortresses as part of the Eighth Air Force's strategic bombing campaign.

The 96th BG transitioned to operational status at Snetterton Heath after being used as a training unit. It entered combat in May 1943 and functioned primarily as a strategic bombardment organization throughout the war.

Snetterton was the most conveniently reached station from 3rd Division Headquarters at Elveden Hall, thus units of the 96th often led major operations carrying commanding generals. General Curtis LeMay led the Regensburg shuttle mission to North Africa flying out of this base, and received a Distinguished Unit Citation for withstanding severe assaults by enemy fighters. The 96th also led the 3rd Division on the famous Schweinfurt mission of 14 October 1943.

The 96th also attacked shipyards, harbours, railway yards, aerodromes, oil refineries, aircraft factories, and other industrial targets in Germany, France, the Netherlands, Belgium, Norway, Poland, Hungary and Czechoslovakia.

The 96th received another DUC for leading the 45th Bomb Wing a great distance through heavy clouds and intense anti-aircraft fire to raid important aircraft component factories in Poland on 9 April 1944. Other significant targets included airfields at Bordeaux and Augsburg; marshalling yards at Kiel, Hamm, Brunswick, and Gdynia; aircraft factories at Chemnitz, Hanover, and Diósgyőr; oil refineries at Merseburg and Brüx, and chemical works in Wiesbaden, Ludwigshafen, and Neunkirchen.

In addition to strategic operations, missions of the 96th BG included bombing coastal defences, railway bridges, gun emplacements, and field batteries in the battle area prior to and during the invasion of Normandy in June 1944; attacking enemy positions in support of the breakthrough at Saint-Lô in July 1944; aiding the campaign in France in August by striking roads and road junctions, and by dropping supplies to the Maquis; and attacking, during the early months of 1945, the communications supplying German armies on the western front.

After V-E Day, the group was scheduled for occupation duties in Germany however plans were revised and the 96th BG flew food to the Netherlands and hauled redeployed personnel to French Morocco, Ireland, France, and Germany. In November 1945 its aircraft were flown back to the United States, and its squadrons were inactivated. The ground personnel left Snetterton Heath in early December, arriving at Camp Kilmer, New Jersey.

The 96th Bomb Group was inactivated on 21 December 1945.

=== Postwar use ===
After the war, the airfield was by No. 262 Maintenance Unit RAF between December 1945 and November 1948. At the end of 1948 the airfield was closed and fell into disuse.

== Current use ==
The original Snetterton Circuit (green) was laid out on the runways and taxiways of RAF Snetterton Heath (light brown) in the early 1950s. Redevelopment over the subsequent 60 years has reduced the portion of the property used, but the modern circuit (red) still largely conforms to the air base footprint.

With the end of military control Snetterton Heath was privately purchased in 1952 with a view to using the runways and perimeter tracks as a motor racing circuit. The first motor cycle meeting was held in 1953 and the first motor races the following year.

Today, banking and safety barriers have transformed the airfield and Snetterton Circuit is used extensively; not only for local club, national, as well as international racing, but for the testing and development of new designs of motor cycles and cars.

A memorial window to the 96th Bomb Group can be seen in Quidenham church. There is also a sculpture commemorating the 96th BG on the approach road to the racing circuit, and a museum at the nearby New Eccles Hall School. Both the sculpture and the murals at the museum are the work of the school's Art teacher.

== See also ==
- List of former Royal Air Force stations
- Snetterton Circuit
- Snetterton
