= 386th Air Expeditionary Wing =

US Air Force provisional unit

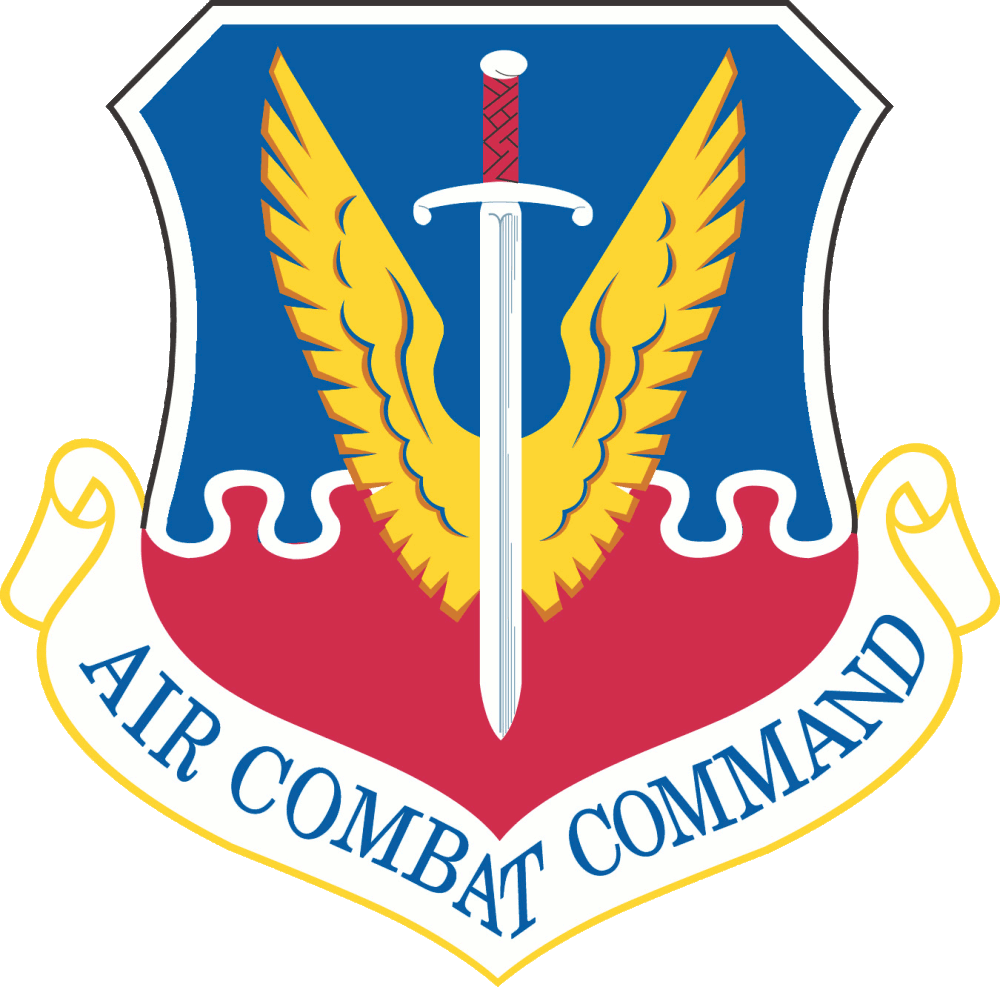
386th Air Expeditionary Wing

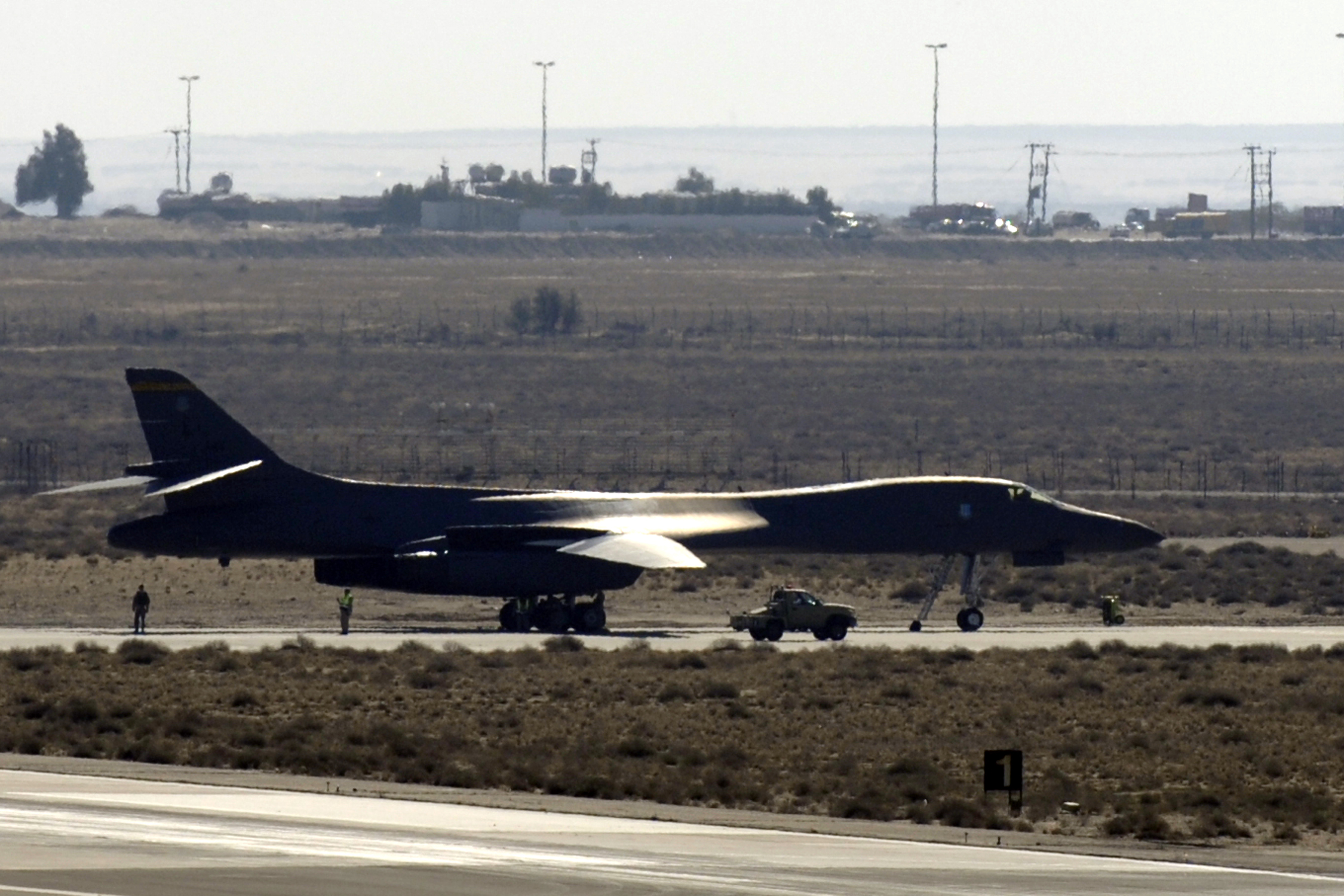
- A B-1B Lancer sits on the "hot ramp" waiting to be refueled by 386th Air Expeditionary Wing personnel
- Active: 1942–1945; 1956–1957; 2002–present
- Country: United States
- Branch: United States Air Force
- Part of: United States Air Forces Central
- Garrison/HQ: Ali Al Salem Air Base, Kuwait
- Decorations: Distinguished Unit Citation Meritorious Unit Commendation#Air Force

Commanders
- Current commander: Colonel Sergio E. Anaya
- Notable commanders: Joe W. Kelly

Insignia
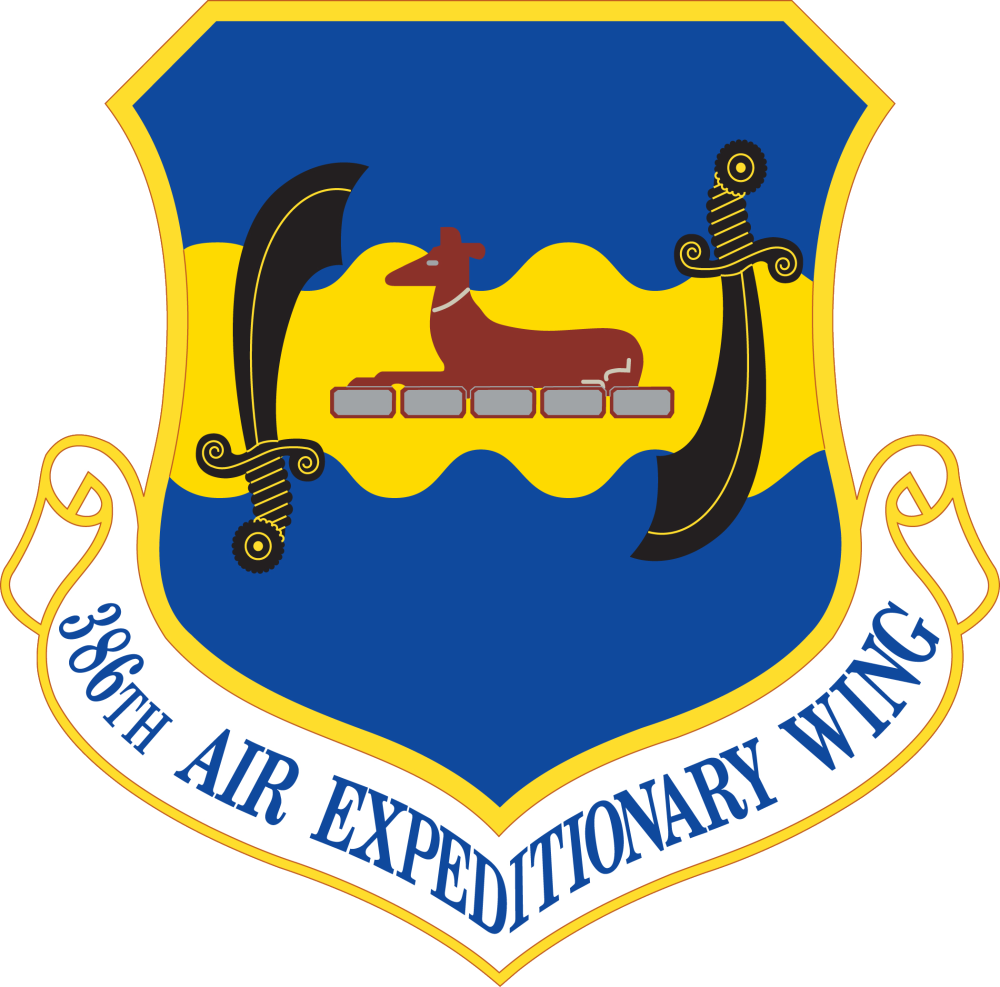
- 386th Air Expeditionary Wing emblem

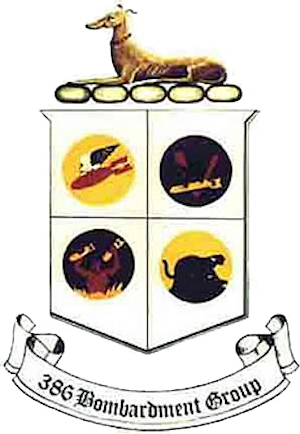
- 386h Bombardment Group emblem

The 386th Air Expeditionary Wing is a provisional United States Air Force unit assigned to United States Air Forces Central. As a provisional unit, it may be activated or inactivated at any time. It is currently stationed at Ali Al Salem Air Base, Kuwait in the Middle East. The wing's mission is to provide combat air power.

During World War II, the wing, then the 386th Bombardment Group, was a Martin B-26 Marauder bombardment group assigned to the Eighth and later Ninth Air Force. During the Battle of Normandy, it supported Allied forces at Caen, and participated in combat operations against German forces at Saint-Lô on 25 July 1944. It also took part in clearing the Falaise pocket and hit strong points at Brest.

From 1955 to 1957, as the 386th Fighter-Bomber Group, the wing operated North American F-86 Sabres. During its deactivation in 1957 it was in the process of being equipped with the North American F-100 Super Sabre.

== History ==
=== World War II ===
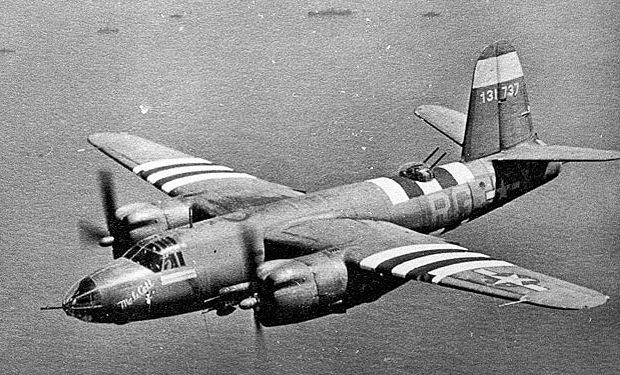
Martin B-26B Marauder 41-31737, 552d Bomb Squadron

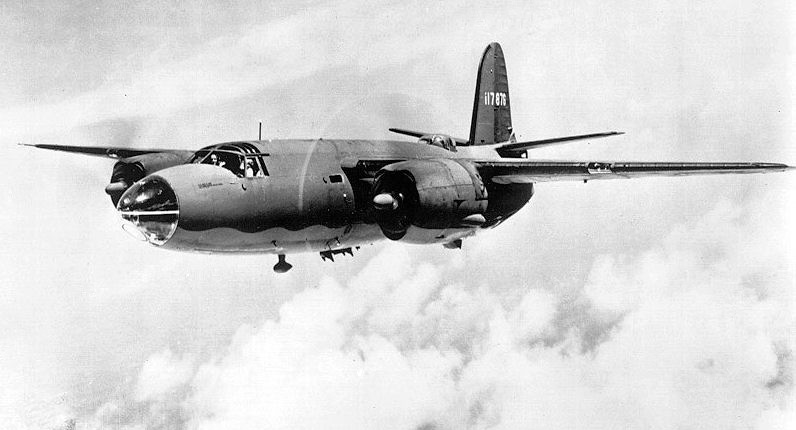
Martin B-26B Marauder 41-17876, 552d Bomb Squadron

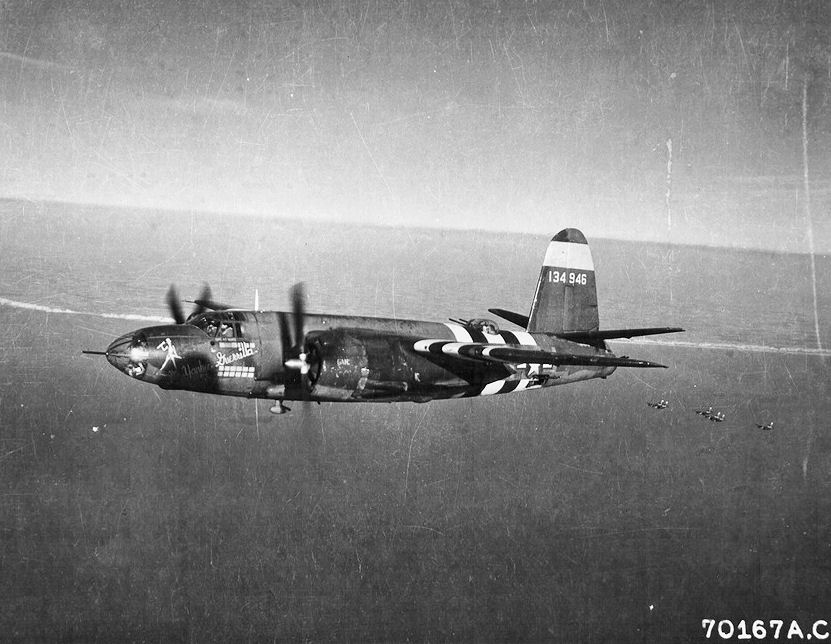
Martin B-26C Marauder 41-34946 555th Bomb Squadron

The unit was constituted as the 386th Bombardment Group on 25 November 1942, and was activated on 1 December 1942 at MacDill Field, Florida. The group was equipped with the Martin B-26 Marauder medium bomber. Its operational squadrons were the 552d, 553d, 554th Fighter-Bomber Squadron and 555th Bombardment Squadrons

After training at several airfields in the United States, the group was deployed to Europe in June 1943 and was assigned initially to the 3rd Bombardment Wing of the Eighth Air Force at RAF Snetterton Heath, England. The group remained at Snetterton Heath only a few days, being transferred to RAF Boxted in north Essex on 10 June 1943 where the Martin B-26 Marauder groups were being consolidated for operations and retrained in medium altitude bombing after low level tactics had produced disastrous losses. The group flew its first mission on 30 July, with operations concentrating on airfields but also attacked marshalling yards and gun positions along the channel coast.

The 386th was again transferred to RAF Great Dunmow on 24 September 1943. Missions of the 386th concentrated on airfields but also bombed marshalling yards and gun positions during the first months of combat. In common with all B-26 Marauder units of the Eighth Air Force, the 386th was transferred to Ninth Air Force on 16 October 1943.

Tactical operations were carried out against V-weapon sites along the coast of France in the winter of 1943–1944, and bombed airfields in the Netherlands and Belgium during Big Week, 20–25 February 1944.

Great Dunmow was the first airfield visited by General Eisenhower in his USAAF airfield tour on Tuesday, 11 April 1944, and he arrived in time to see thirty-nine Ninth Air Force Marauders take off at twenty second intervals for a mission to attack the marshalling yards in Charleroi, Belgium.

The 386th hammered gun positions, and airfields preceding the invasion of Normandy and made numerous assaults on bridges of the Seinelate in May. Struck coastal batteries on D-Day and hit bridges, supply and fuel stores, gun positions, and defended areas during the remainder of the Battle of Normandy. Supported Allied forces at Caen, and participated in the massive blows against the enemy at Saint-Lô on 25 July 1944. Knocked out targets to help clear the Falaise pocket of German forces in August 1944 and hit strong points at Brest during September.

In July 1944, the 553rd Bomb Squadron was selected to host the squadron performing operational testing on the new Douglas A-26 Invader. A special squadron of A-26s was attached to the 386th Bombardment Group by order of "Special Operations Order #205, Project 3AF JY Class TM 0725", which created the "A-26 Combat Evaluation Project Squadron" - or simply, Project Squadron to the crews. This squadron conducted eight combat missions with the 386th between 6 Sep 1944 and 19 Sep 1944. Having successfully completed their evaluation assignment, the Project Squadron was detached from the 386th and transferred to the 416th Bombardment Group to train their pilots on converting over to the A-26.

On 2 October 1944, the 386th Bomb Group moved to Beaumont-sur-Oise Airfield, in Normandy, France. On the continent, the 386th also used the following Advanced Sint-Truiden Airfield, Belgium, 9 April – July 1945.

While the unit was at Beaumont-sur-Oise, they were fully converted from the B-26 Marauder to the A-26 Invader. By March 1945, the 386th Bomb Group was flying Invaders in combat missions and the old B-26s had been retired stateside.

After V-E Day, the group returned to the United States, first to Seymour Johnson Field, then to Westover Field where the unit was inactivated and its aircraft was dispersed. The 386th was inactivated on 7 November 1945.

=== Cold War ===
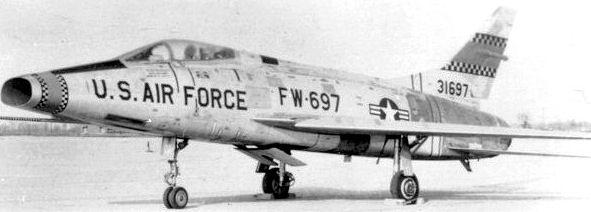
Wing F-100A Super Sabre (Note: Aircraft is North American F-100A-20-NA Super Sabre, serial 53-1697 at Bunker Hill AFB, Indiana.)

The 386th Fighter-Bomber Group was activated on 8 April 1956 (Note: A 386th Troop Carrier Wing had been established on 23 March 1953, but was never made active. Ravenstein, p. 208.) at Bunker Hill Air Force Base, Indiana as part of the 323d Fighter-Bomber Wing. Assigned to the Tactical Air Command, the group had three squadrons, 552d, 553d and 554th. Initially training with North American F-86F Sabres, these were quickly upgraded to the F-86H and then to the North American F-100A Super Sabre to become proficient in tactical air operations. The group's aircraft wore a band on the tail, and around the nose edged with small black checkers.

In 1955, Strategic Air Command (SAC) began stationing units at the base, and Bunker Hill was transferred to SAC in September 1957. With the turnover of the base to SAC, the 323d was phased down and replaced by the SAC 4041st Air Base Group on 1 September 1957.

=== Iraq War ===
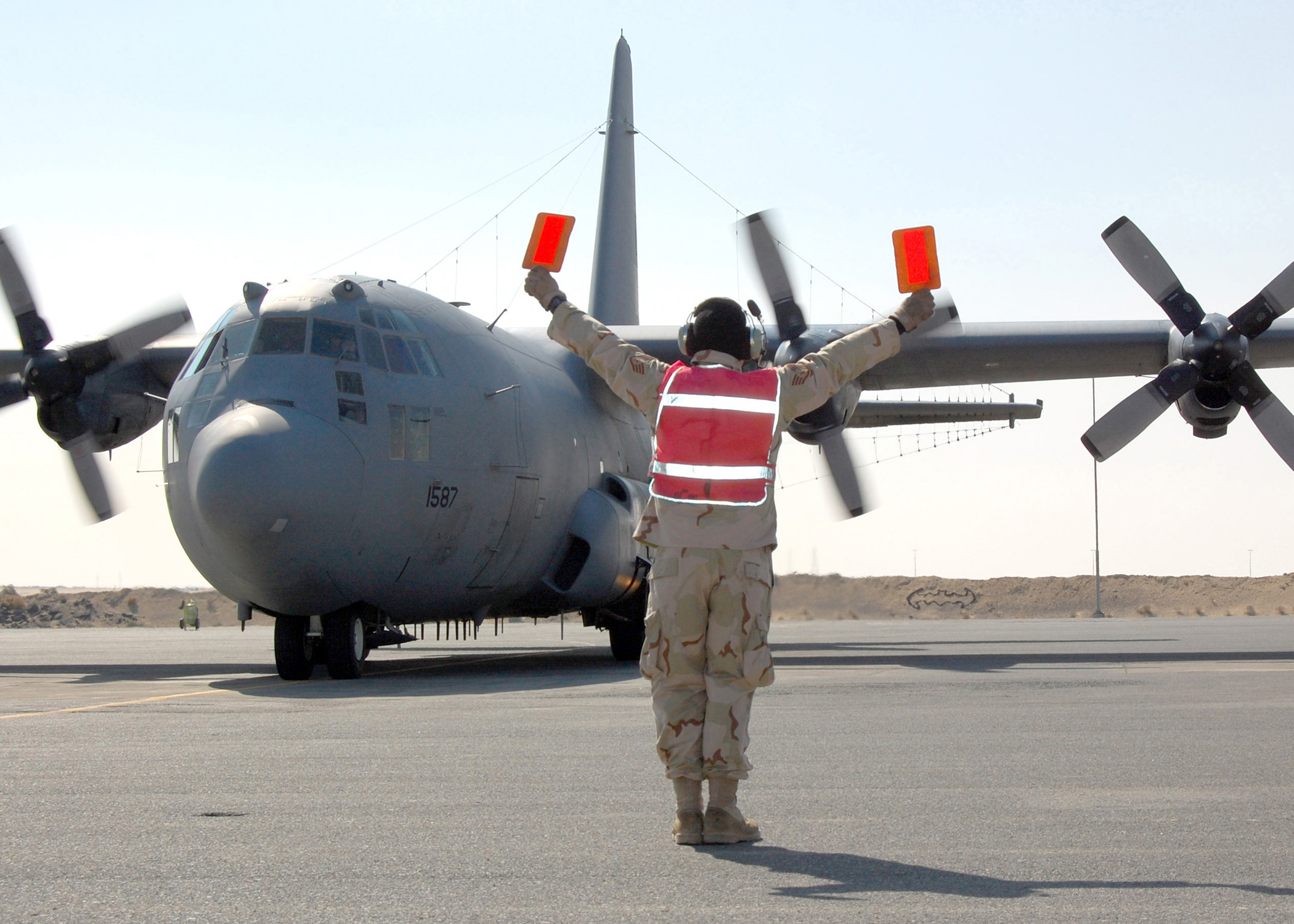
Staff Sgt. Jeffrey Weeks, 386th Expeditionary Aircraft Maintenance Squadron, marshals an EC-130H Compass Call on the flightline

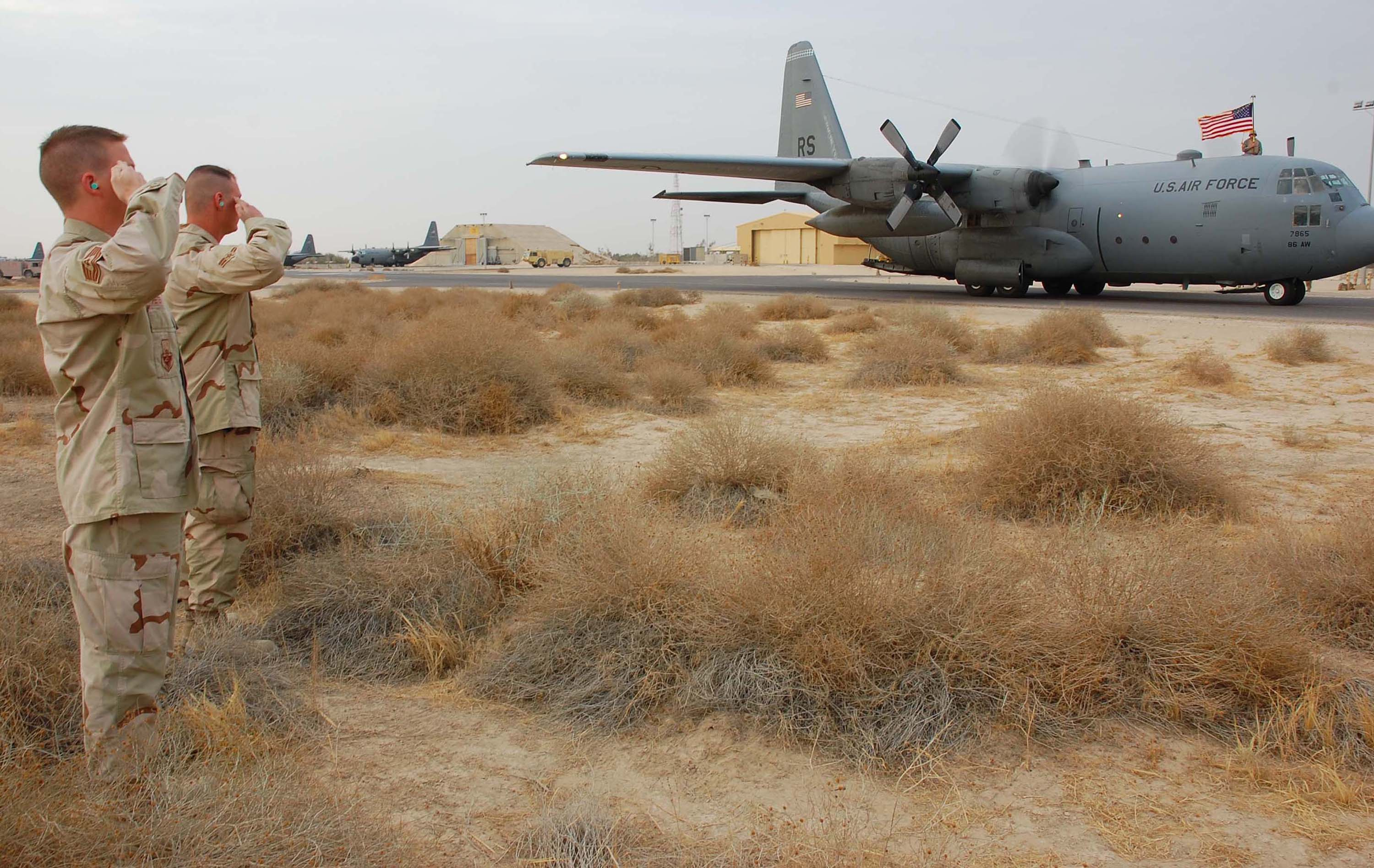
Airmen from the 386th Air Expeditionary Wing proudly render a final salute to C-130 aircraft, tail number 63-7865 at Ali Al Salem Air Base (Note: The aircraft had just flown its last combat mission and will be flown to Davis–Monthan Air Force Base, Arizona, where it will be laid to rest at the "boneyard." The C-130 became an honorary purple heart recipient in June 1972 for damages sustained from mortar fire in the Vietnam War.)

During the summer of 2001, U.S. Air Force personnel from all over the world were called to participate in Operation Southern Watch's AEF-6, also called the 386th Air Expeditionary Group. From the late spring to early fall, the active duty Airmen were joined by members of the Air National Guard and Air Force Reserve. Although from different divisions of the same service, they personified the "seamless air force" concept.

Air Expeditionary Force Eight came to a hot start under the desert sun when members of the 729th Air Control Squadron from Hill Air Force Base, Utah, arrived in August 2001. There was a two-thirds changeover of base personnel due to rotations. Approximately one-third of the members assigned to the 729th deployed to here assuming duties as the 386th Expeditionary Air Control Squadron for the next 90 days. The 386th EACS began focused preparations for the deployment about six months earlier. Their wartime mission was to deploy to potentially austere environments, so the base here was not much of a departure. In 2000, the first hardened structures were built here. Hardened structures continue to be built on The Rock.

In 2002 the group was redesignated as the 386th Air Expeditionary Group. Effective 12 August, 2002, a few months prior to the start of the Iraq War, the group was redesignated the 386th Air Expeditionary Wing and replaced the 9th Air Expeditionary Group under the 9th Air Expeditionary Task Force. At the same time, the 363d Air Expeditionary Wing was being inactivated.

=== Twenty-first century ===
The wing has a diverse mission that canvasses the United States Central Command (CENTCOM) area of responsibility. The 386th is the primary aerial hub for Operation Inherent Resolve and provides airlift support for various operations around the CENTCOM AOR.

The wing includes Continental Staff System directorates (referred to as "A-staff" within the USAF), the special staff, flying units, and, from October 2023, the 386th Expeditionary Air Base Group. The A-staff runs the wing. The special staff is composed of legal, public affairs and other helping agencies. The flying units consist of C-130s, MQ-9s and U.S. Army helicopters. The 386th EABG is composed of units from Civil Engineering, Security Forces, Logistics, Medical, Communications, Contracting, Force Support and Maintenance.

The wing is also home to one of two contingency aeromedical staging facilities in the theater. The staging facility serves as a gateway for patients airlifted to Germany or the United States for further medical treatment.

In 2019, the wing included the following groups:

- 386th Expeditionary Operations Group
- 387th Air Expeditionary Group located at Abdullah Al-Mubarak Air Base (Cargo City) and Ali Al Salem Air Base
- 407th Air Expeditionary Group located at Ali Al Salem Air Base and Ahmad al-Jaber Air Base
- 386th Expeditionary Air Base Group

== Lineage ==
- Established as 386th Bombardment Group (Medium) on 25 November 1942

Activated on 1 December 1942
Redesignated 386th Bombardment Group, Medium on 20 August 1943
Redesignated 386th Bombardment Group, Light on 23 June 1945
Inactivated on 7 November 1945
Redesignated 386th Fighter-Bomber Group on 31 October 1955
Activated on 8 April 1956
Inactivated on 8 July 1957
Redesignated 386th Tactical Fighter Group on 31 July 1985 (Remained inactive)
Redesignated 386th Air Expeditionary Group and converted to provisional status on 25 July 2000
Activated in 2002
Redesignated 386th Air Expeditionary Wing on 12 August 2002

=== Assignments ===
- III Bomber Command, 1 December 1942
- Eighth Air Force, c. 2 June 1943
- 3d Bombardment Wing, 4 June 1943
- IX Bomber Command, 16 October 1943
- 98th Combat Bombardment Wing (later 98th Bombardment Wing), 5 December 1943
- First Air Force, August-7 November 1945
- Ninth Air Force, 8 April 1956 – 8 July 1957 (attached to 323rd Fighter-Bomber Wing)
- Air Combat Command to activate or inactivate any time after 25 July 2000

United States Air Forces Central, 2002 – present

=== Components ===
- 552d Bombardment (later Fighter-Bomber) Squadron, 1 December 1942 – 7 November 1945; 8 April 1956 – 8 July 1957
- 553d Bombardment (later Fighter-Bomber) Squadron, 1 December 1942 – 7 November 1945; 8 April 1956 – 8 July 1957
- 554th Bombardment (later Fighter-Bomber) Squadron, 1 December 1942 – 7 November 1945; 8 April 1956 – 8 July 1957
- 555th Bombardment Squadron, 1 December 1942 – 7 November 1945
- 586th Expeditionary Mission Support [later Air Expeditionary] Group, September 2005 – 17 June 2010
- 586th Expeditionary Security Forces Squadron, March 2005 – December 2008
- 586th Expeditionary Support Squadron, ? – 2010
- 886th Expeditionary Security Forces Squadron, ? – May 2008
- 887th Expeditionary Security Forces Squadron, ? – December 2009

=== Stations ===
- MacDill Field, Florida, 1 December 1942
- Lake Charles Army Air Field, Louisiana, 9 February-8 May 1943
- RAF Snetterton Heath (AAF-138), England, 3 June 1943
- RAF Boxted (AAF-150), England, 10 June 1943
- RAF Great Dunmow (AAF-164), England, 24 September 1943
- Beaumont-sur-Oise Airfiel] (A-60), France 2 October 1944
- Sint-Truiden Airfield (A-92), Belgium, 9 April – 27 July 1945
- Seymour Johnson Field, North Carolina, 7 August 1945
- Westover Field, Massachusetts, 30 September – 7 November 1945
- Bunker Hill Air Force Base, Indiana, 8 April 1956 – 8 July 1957
- Ali Al Salem Air Base, Kuwait, September 2000–present

=== Major aircraft flown ===
- Martin B-26 Marauder, 1942–1944
- Douglas A-26 Invader, Aug 1944–1956
- North American F-86F/H Sabre, 1956–1957
- North American F-100 Super Sabre, 1957
- 2003 – January – GR-4, C-130E, RQ-1B, RC-12, MQ-1
- 2003 – December – C-130H, C130E, C-12, UC-35, C-23
- 2004 – April – C-130H, C-12, UC-25, C-23
- 2004 – June–Present – C-130E, C-130H, EC-130

== See also ==
- List of Martin B-26 Marauder operators
