= RAF Boxted =

Airport in Boxted, Essex

RAF Boxted USAAF Station AAF-150
- Near Boxted, Essex in England
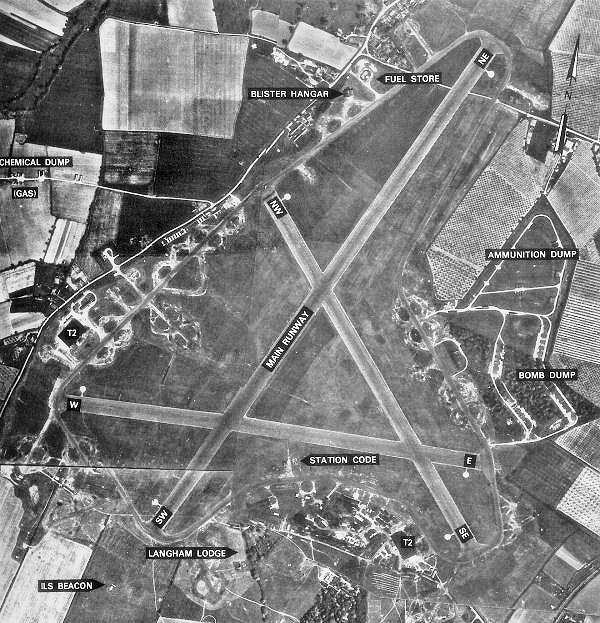
- Boxted Airfield - 10 May 1946. As with many wartime airfields, public rights of way were arbitrarily closed or diverted. A year after the war ended, Park Lane was still cut in the north by the fuel dump and the 22 end of the main runway.

Site information
- Type: Royal Air Force station
- Code: BX
- Owner: Air Ministry
- Operator: Royal Air Force; United States Army Air Forces
- Controlled by: Eighth Air Force; Ninth Air Force; RAF Fighter Command

Location
- Shown within Essex RAF Boxted (the United Kingdom)
- Coordinates: 51°56′16″N 000°55′55″E

Site history
- Built: 1943
- In use: 1943 - 1947
- Battles/wars: European theatre of World War II

Airfield information
- Elevation: 12 metres (39 ft) AMSL
Runways
Direction	Length and surface
02/20	1,828 metres (5,997 ft) Asphalt
06/24	1,280 metres (4,199 ft) Asphalt
16/34	1,280 metres (4,199 ft) Asphalt

Royal Air Force Boxted or more simply RAF Boxted is a former Royal Air Force station located 4 miles (6.4 km) north-northeast of Colchester, Essex, England.

Opened in 1943, it was used by the United States Army Air Forces (USAAF). RAF Boxted has the distinction of having been the airfield for the two most successful USAAF fighter groups in air-to-air combat. After the war it was used by the Royal Air Force for jet aircraft testing. It was closed in 1947.

Today the remains of the airfield are located on private property being used as agricultural fields. It also has a small grass private airstrip and a museum which opened in 2011.

== History ==
=== United States Army Air Forces use ===
The airfield was used by the United States Army Air Forces Eighth Air Force and Ninth Air Forces. It was known as USAAF Station AAF-150 for security reasons by the USAAF during the war, and by which it was referred to instead of location. Its USAAF Station Code was "BX".

USAAF Station Units assigned to RAF Boxted were:

- 33d Service Group (VIII Air Force Service Command)

41st and 45th Service Squadron; HHS 33d Service Group

- 15th Station Complement Squadron
- 1030th Signal Company
- 1126th Quartermaster Company
- 1181st Military Police Company
- 1631st Ordnance Supply & Maintenance Company
- 2124th Engineer Fire Fighting Platoon
- 589th Army Postal Unit

==== 386th Bombardment Group (Medium) ====
Although Boxted was scheduled to receive the 96th Bombardment Group in June 1943, plans were changed and the Boeing B-17 Flying Fortress group went instead to RAF Snetterton Heath in Norfolk. In its place, the 386th Bombardment Group (Medium) was moved from Snetterton on 12 June to consolidate the Martin B-26 Marauder groups in Essex for operations. The group was assigned to the VIII Bomber Command 3d Bomb Wing and flew both B-26B/C Marauder aircraft. Its operational squadrons were:

- 552d Bombardment Squadron (RG)
- 553d Bombardment Squadron (AN)
- 554th Bombardment Squadron (RU)
- 555th Bombardment Squadron (YA)

The group flew its first mission on 20 July, with operations concentrating on airfields but also attacked marshalling yards and gun positions along the channel coast.

The group was transferred to RAF Great Dunmow on 24 September 1943.

==== 354th Fighter Group ====
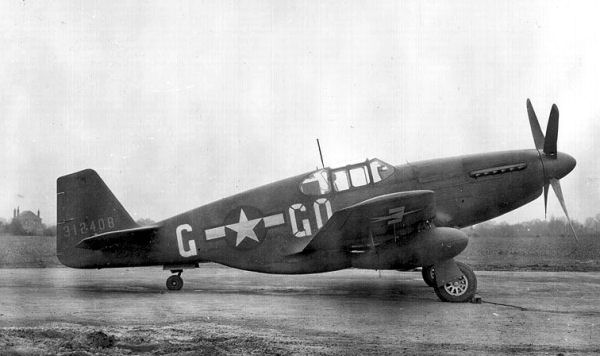
North American P-51B-1-NA Mustang Serial 43-12408 of the 355th Fighter Squadron

The 354th Fighter Group, was under the operational control of the VIII Fighter Command during its stay at Boxted, arriving from RAF Greenham Common on 13 November 1943 Its combat squadrons were:

- 353d Fighter Squadron (FT)
- 355th Fighter Squadron (GQ)
- 356th Fighter Squadron (AJ)

The group provided long-range escort for US heavy bombers and received a Distinguished Unit Citation for its activities up to mid-May 1944 during which the 354th was instrumental in the development of the P-51 for use in long-range missions to escort heavy bombers on raids deep into enemy territory.

During that same period Colonel James H Howard won the Medal of Honor for his single-handed efforts to defend a bomber formation that was attacked by a large force of enemy planes while on a mission to Oschersleben, Germany on 11 January 1944. Colonel Howard attacked a formation of thirty German aircraft pressing home the attack for more than thirty minutes he destroyed three aircraft and, even when he was low on fuel and his ammunition was exhausted, he continued his aggressive tactics to protect the bombers.

In mid-April 1944, the 354th flew south to RAF Lashenden in Kent prior to moving to the Continent after the invasion of Normandy.

==== 56th Fighter Group ====
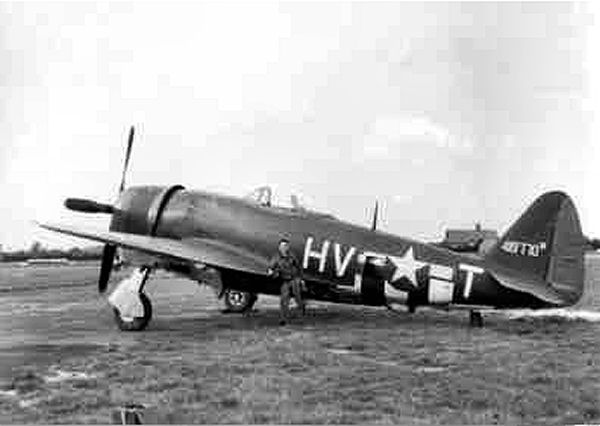
Republic P-47D-28-RE Thunderbolt Serial 44–19770, 61st Fighter Squadron

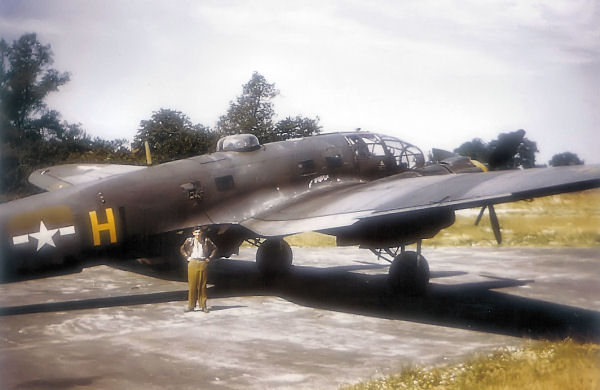
Heinkel He 111 Nr. 701152 at Boxted, 2 July 1945 after being acquired by the 56th FG on detachment in France. The aircraft was repainted in the markings of the 61st Fighter Squadron. After the 56th departed for the United States, this aircraft was turned over to the RAF and today it can be viewed at the Battle of Britain display at Hendon, London.

With the departure of the 354th, its place was taken by the 56th Fighter Group which was transferred from RAF Halesworth on 19 April 1944 to enable that base to be converted to a heavy bomber installation. Its operational squadrons were:

- 61st Fighter Squadron (HV)
- 62d Fighter Squadron (LM)
- 63d Fighter Squadron (UN)

Flying the Republic P-47 Thunderbolt, the 56th Fighter Group was the most successful of the Eighth Air Force groups in air-to-air combat, and the second most successful in the USAAF with 665.5 (the 354th FG had 701 while the Pacific-based 49th FG had 664). It engaged in counter-air and interdictory missions during the invasion of Normandy in June 1944. Supported Allied forces for the breakthrough at Saint-Lô in July and participated in the Battle of the Bulge, December 1944-January 1945. Helped to defend the Remagen bridgehead against air attacks in March 1945.

While at Boxted, the group received a Distinguished Unit Citation for strikes against antiaircraft positions while supporting the airborne attack on the Netherlands on 18 September 1944, an operation in which 16 P-47s were shot down or crashlanded in Allied territory.

The commander of the 61st FS, Lieutenant Colonel Francis Gabreski, destroyed his 28th enemy aircraft in air combat, a record unequalled by any American fighter pilot in Europe. On 20 July 1944, Gabreski had to make a belly landing in his P-47 Thunderbolt after his propeller clipped the ground while strafing an airfield near Koblenz, Germany. Although he avoided capture for five days before being finally arrested and interrogated by the Germans, he was greeted with the words: 'Hello Gabby, we've been waiting for you for a long time!'

The 56th remained at Boxted until October when it returned to Camp Kilmer, New Jersey, being inactivated on 18 October 1945.

==== 5th Emergency Rescue Squadron ====
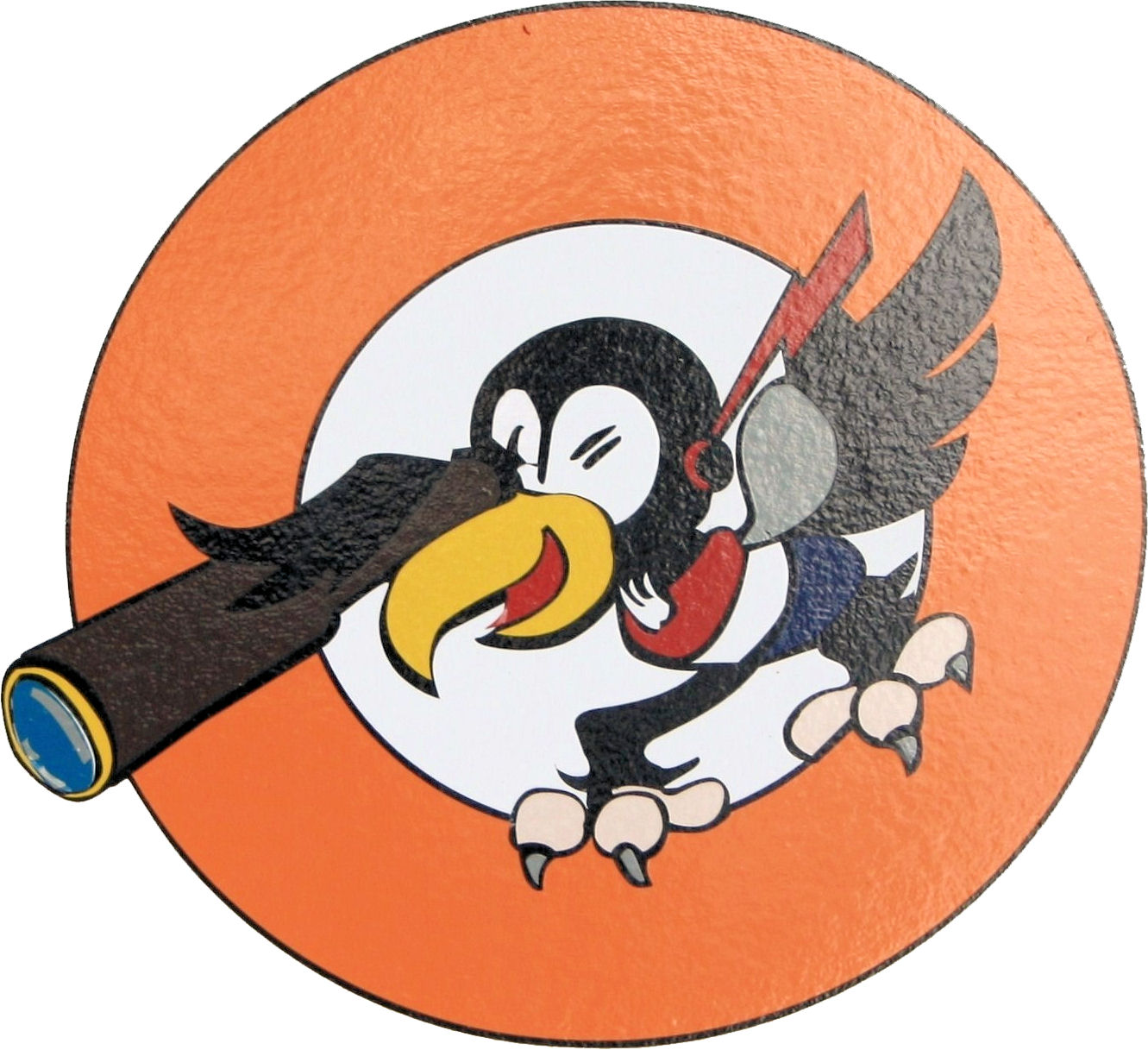
Emblem of the 5th Emergency Rescue Squadron.

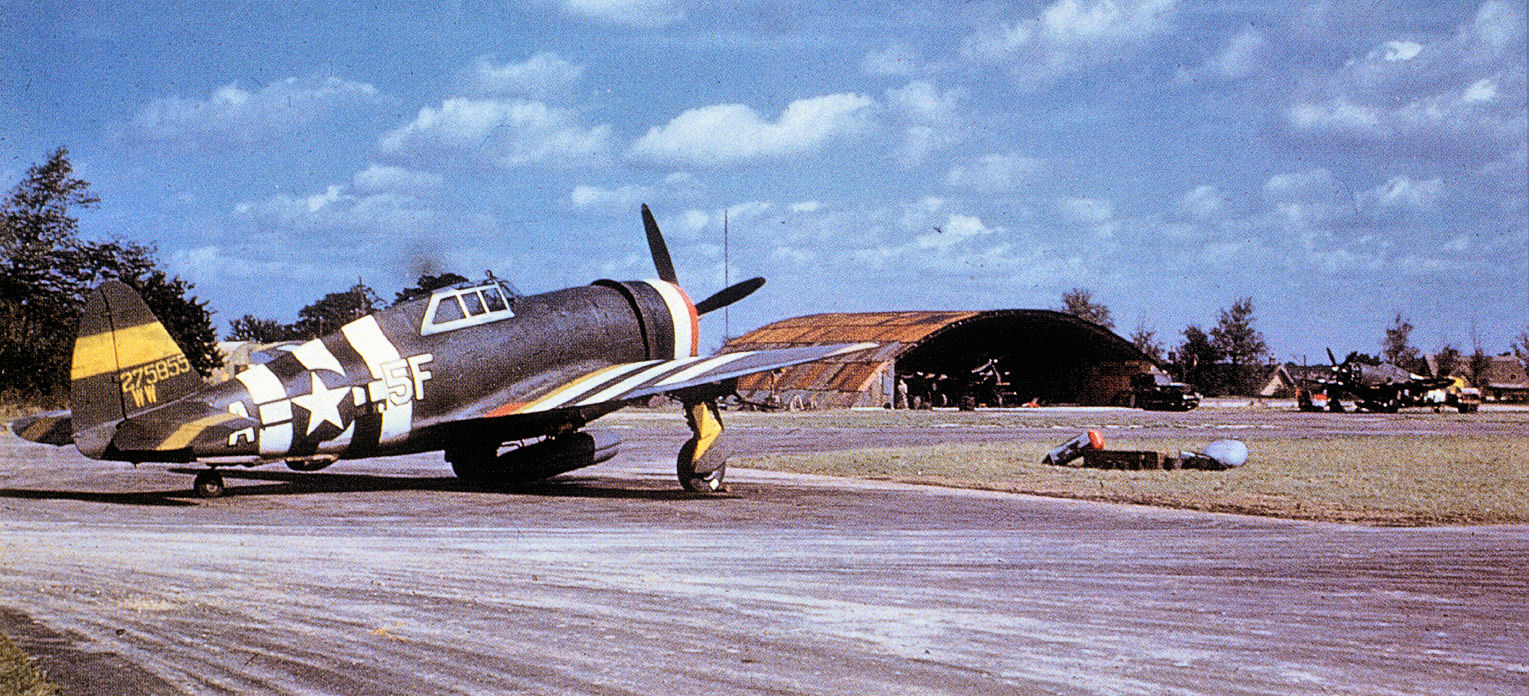
Republic P-47D-15-RE Thunderbolt Serial 42-75855 of the 5th Emergency Rescue Squadron at Boxted.

Originally designated as Detachment B of the 65th Fighter Wing, the 5th Emergency Rescue Squadron was activated at Boxted in May 1944. The squadron's mission was to perform air/sea rescue missions with war weary Republic P-47 Thunderbolts transferred from other fighter groups.

The squadron's fuselage code was "5F".

The aircraft were modified to carry dinghies, marker buoys and flares on their bomb racks. The mission of the unit was to locate pilots who had bailed out over the North Sea and would drop liferafts and inform sea-based rescue units who would then pick up the pilots.

The unit moved to RAF Halesworth in January 1945.

=== Royal Air Force use ===
After the war, Boxted was taken over by RAF Fighter Command and used at first by de Havilland Mosquito night fighters and then, in 1946, by a Gloster Meteor jet squadron No. 234. By the end 1946, the flying units had moved on and work had begun on resurfacing the main runway. It was closed on 9 August 1947.

The following units were also here at some point:

- No 1 Fighter Command Servicing Unit
- No. 25 Squadron RAF
- No. 56 Squadron RAF
- No. 145 Gliding School RAF
- No. 222 (Natal) Squadron RAF
- No. 263 (Fellowship of the Bellows) Squadron RAF
- No. 266 (Rhodesia) Squadron RAF
- No. 2876 Squadron RAF Regiment
- Station Flight, Boxted

== Current use ==
Only the outline of the airfield remains with single lane farm roads as the airfield has almost been completely returned to agriculture. The control tower has been demolished, but a cluster of Nissen Huts remain on the south side of the airfield close to Langham Lodge 51°55′52″N 000°55′59″E. Two further refurbished Nissen Huts are present on the west of original airbase and house the Boxted Airfield Museum. A portion of the original main runway remains in use as a grass airstrip (04/22).

A memorial to the pilots and crews who flew from RAF Boxted is located on the northernmost end of the original runway where it meets Park Lane.

== See also ==
- List of former Royal Air Force stations
