= RAF Great Dunmow =

Former Royal Air Force station in Essex, England

RAF Great Dunmow RAF Little Easton USAAF Station AAF-164
- Near Bishops Stortford, Essex in England
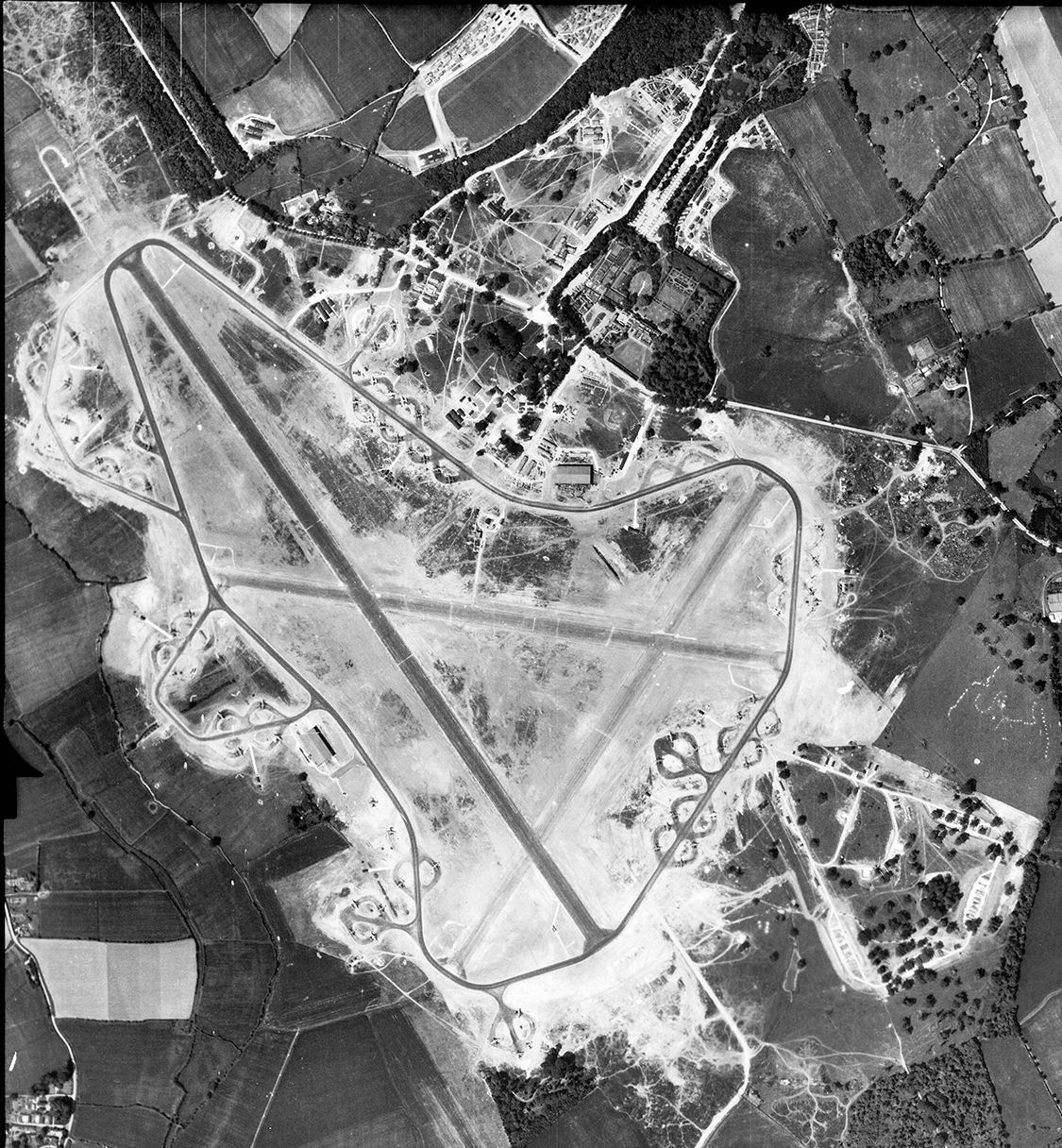
- Aerial photograph of Great Dunmow airfield 30 May 1944.

Site information
- Type: Royal Air Force station
- Code: GD
- Owner: Air Ministry
- Operator: United States Army Air Forces; 1943-1944; Royal Air Force 1944-1946; British Army 1946-1948
- Controlled by: USAAF Eighth Air Force; USAAF Ninth Air Force; RAF Fighter Command 1944-46 * No. 38 Group RAF

Location
- Shown within Essex RAF Great Dunmow (the United Kingdom)
- Coordinates: 51°53′05″N 000°18′32″E

Site history
- Built: 1942/43
- Built by: U.S. Army
- In use: July 1943 - April 1958
- Battles/wars: European theatre of World War II

Airfield information
- Elevation: 99 metres (325 ft) AMSL
Runways
| Direction | Length and surface |
|---|---|
| 04/22 | 1,300 metres (4,265 ft) Concrete |
| 11/29 | 1,300 metres (4,265 ft) Concrete |
| 15/33 | 1,800 metres (5,906 ft) Concrete |

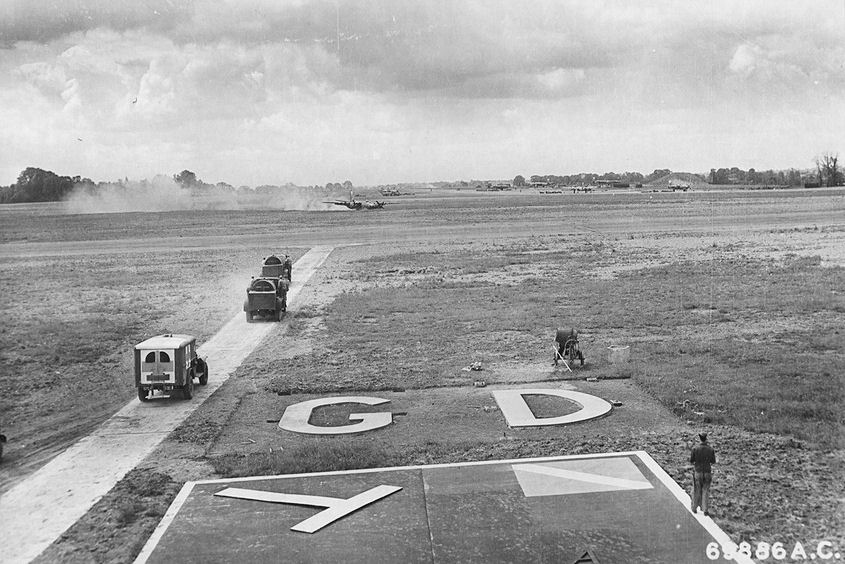
The B-26 Marauder named "Carefree Carolyn" from the 386th Bomb Group comes in for a wheels-up landing after completing its 100th mission on 15 June 1944.

Royal Air Force Great Dunmow or more simply RAF Great Dunmow is a former Royal Air Force station in the parish of Little Easton, Essex, England. The airfield is located approximately 1.4 miles (2.3 km) west of Great Dunmow, north of the A120.

Opened in 1943, it was used by both the Royal Air Force and United States Army Air Forces during the war, primarily as a bomber airfield. The airfield was closed in 1948.

Today the airfield is located on private land primarily used for agriculture.

== History ==
Great Dunmow was designed as a Class A airfield bomber airfield, built by the US Army 818th Engineer Battalion (Aviation) with specialised work by British contractors.

The airfield was built on ancient parkland belonging to Easton Lodge and some 10,000 trees were destroyed to enable its construction, including over 200 mature oak trees. It consisted of a set of three converging runways each containing a concrete runway for takeoffs and landings, optimally placed at 60-degree angles to each other in a triangular pattern. The runways were a 6,000-foot-long (1,800 m) main runway, aligned 15/33 and two secondary 4,200-foot-long (1,300 m) secondary runways, aligned 11/29 and 04/22. An encircling perimeter track was also constructed, containing 50 loop-type hardstands.

=== United States Army Air Forces use ===
Great Dunmow airfield was opened on 1 July 1943 and was used by the United States Army Air Forces Eighth and Ninth Air Forces. It was known as USAAF Station AAF-164 for security reasons by the USAAF during the war, and by which it was referred to instead of location. Its USAAF Station Code was "GD".

USAAF Station Units assigned to RAF Great Dunmow were:

- 70th Service Group

380th Service Squadron; HHS 70th Service Group

- 20th Station Complement Squadron
- 21st Weather Squadron
- 39th Mobile Reclamation and Repair Squadron
- 40th Mobile Communications Squadron

Regular Army Station Units included:

- Quartermaster Depot Q_108
- 1577th Quartermaster Battalion
- 628th Quartermaster Battalion
- 1054th Quartermaster Company
- 1087th Signal Company
- 1176th Military Police Company
- 1769th Ordnance Supply & Maintenance Company
- 2057th Quartermaster Truck Company
- 2196th Quartermaster Truck Company
- 3215th Quartermaster Service Company
- 335th Quartermaster Depot Company
- 340th Quartermaster Depot Company
- 807th Chemical Company
- 2045th Engineer Fire Fighting Platoon
- 194th Medical Dispensary

==== 386th Bombardment Group (Medium) ====
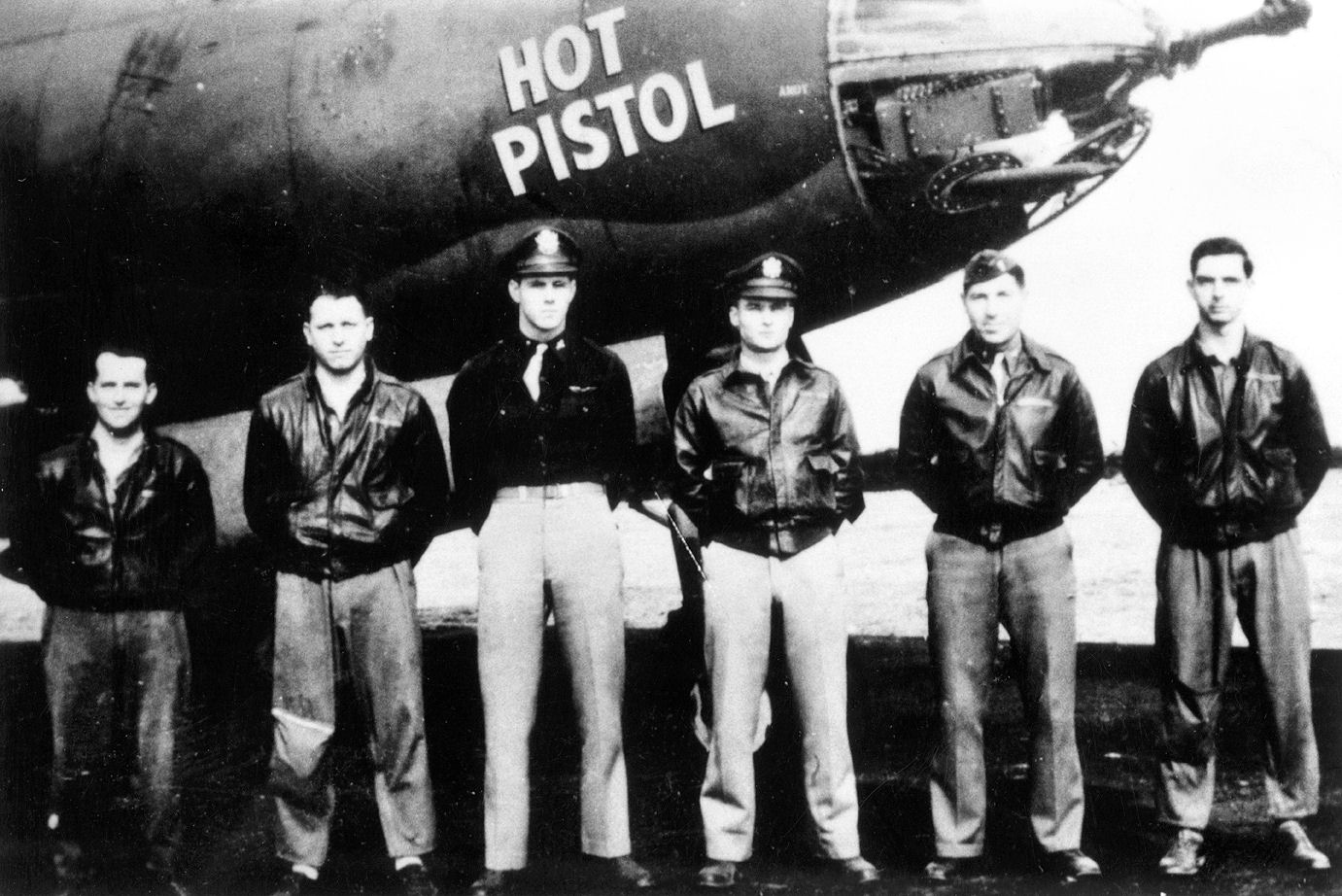
A bomber crew of the 552d Bombardment Squadron with their B-26 Marauder (RG-P, serial number 41-31633) nicknamed "Hot Pistol".

The first unit to use Great Dunmow was the American 386th Bombardment Group (Medium) which arrived from RAF Boxted on 24 September 1943. The group was assigned to the VIII Air Support Command 3d Bombardment Wing and flew Martin B-26B/C Marauders. Operational squadrons of the 322d were:

- 552d Bombardment Squadron (RG)
- 553d Bombardment Squadron (AN)
- 554th Bombardment Squadron (RU)
- 555th Bombardment Squadron (YA)

Missions of the 386th concentrated on airfields but also bombed marshalling yards and gun positions during the first months of combat.

In common with other Marauder units of the 3d Bomb Division, the 386th was transferred to Ninth Air Force 98th Bombardment Wing on 16 October 1943.

On 2 October 1944, the 386th Bomb Group moved to Beaumont-sur-Oise (A-60) Airfield, in Normandy France.

The following units were here at some point:

- No. 190 Squadron RAF with the Short Stirling IV and the Handley Page Halifax III & VII (1944-46)
- No. 620 Squadron RAF with the Stirling IV and Halifax A.7 (1944-46)

The airfield was abandoned in 1948.

== Current use ==
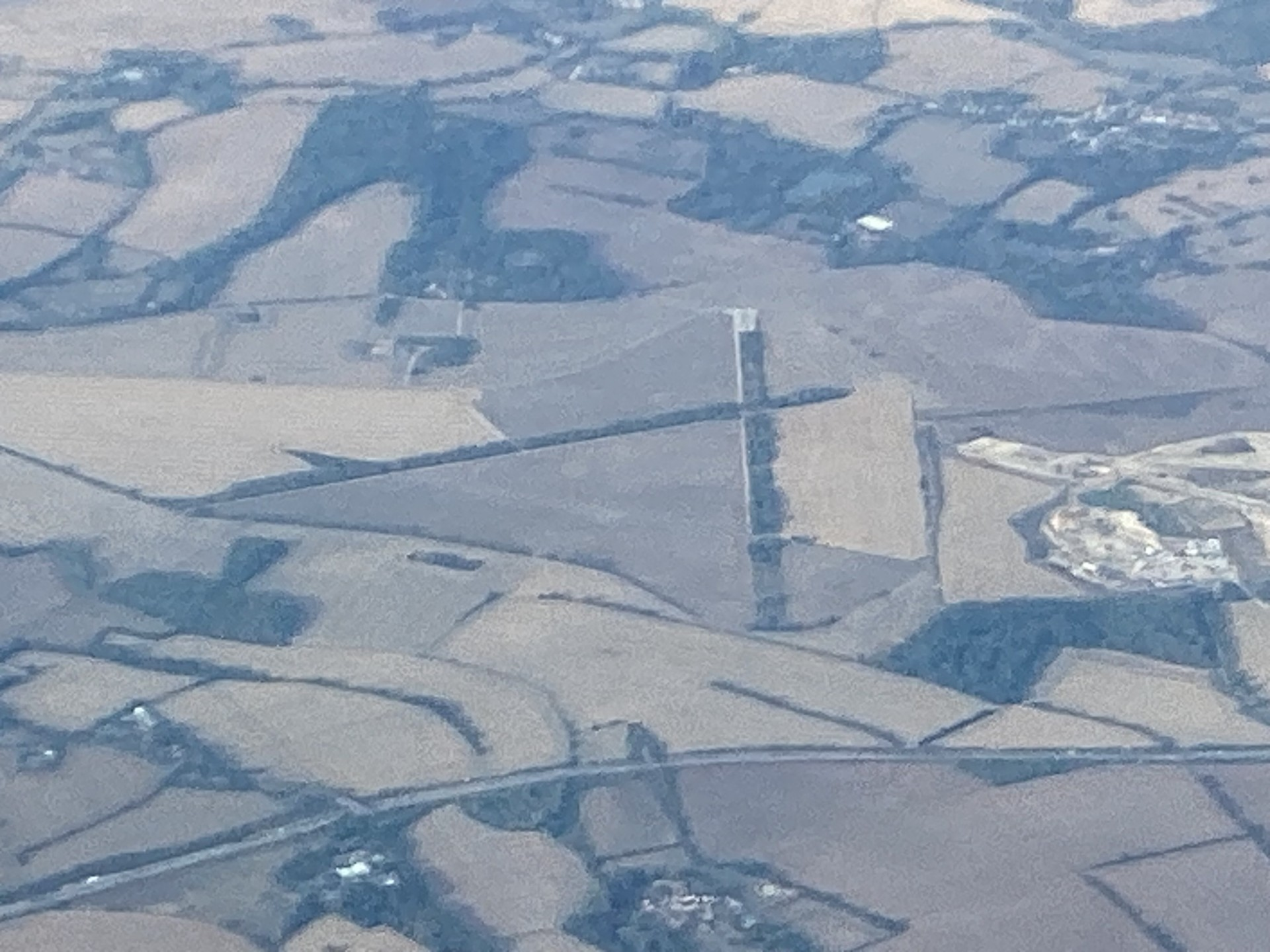
RAF Great Dunmow - September 2026

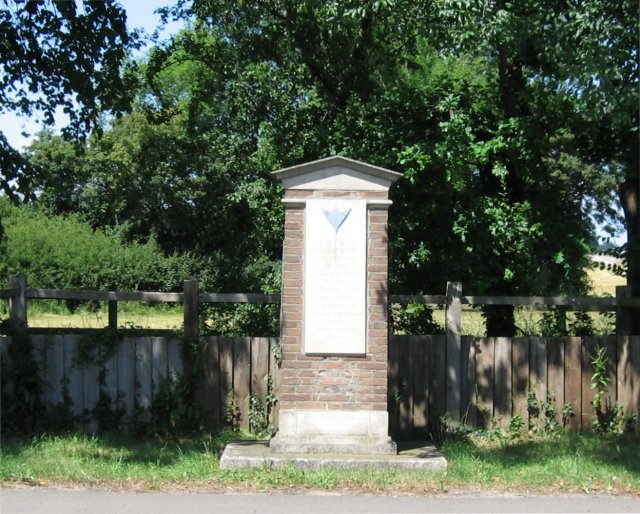
Memorial to the wartime used of Great Dunmow

With the end of military control in 1950 the grassed areas were cut for a grass meal company through the 1950s which supplied it to various farms in the region. Starting in 1960, farming operations commenced and the concrete areas were removed for aggregate in 1965/66 for use as part of the new A12 road.

Today, there is very little left except some single track agricultural roads remaining from the perimeter track and a blister hangar with a few nissen huts near Easton Lodge. The runway layout and the airfield perimeter track are easily identified in aerial photography, but no substantial amount of concrete remains. The 22 end of the secondary northeast runway does however, have a short full width of runway intact, being used for manure storage. The current owners, Landsec hope to redevelop the site and surrounding area, including the construction of around 9,000 homes.

There is a small museum in Great Dunmow which holds some exhibits of the airfield and the 386th Bomb Group, along with a stained glass window memorial in Little Easton church.

== See also ==
- List of former Royal Air Force stations
