= 413th Flight Test Squadron =

413th Flight Test Squadron

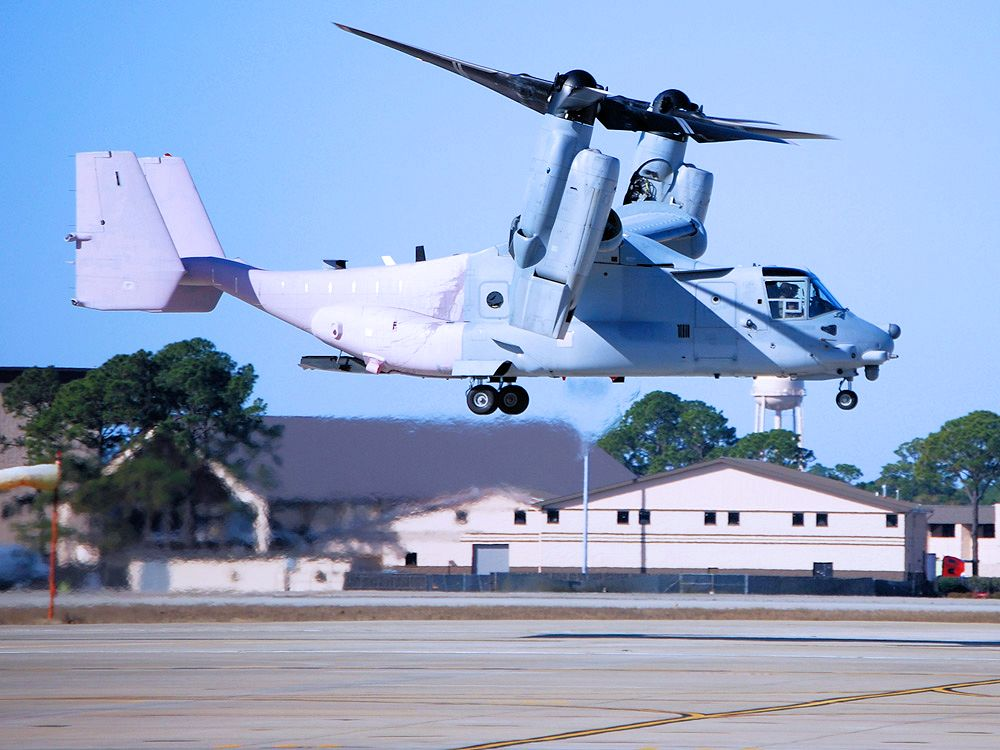
- A squadron CV-22 Osprey hovers over Hurlburt Field, Florida
- Active: 1942–1945; 1947–1949; 1958–1962; 1977–2004; 2005–present
- Country: United States
- Branch: United States Air Force
- Type: Squadron
- Role: Flight testing
- Part of: Air Force Materiel Command
- Garrison/HQ: Hurlburt Field, Florida
- Motto: More with Less (1977-1992)
- Engagements: European Theater of Operations
- Decorations: Distinguished Unit Citation; Air Force Outstanding Unit Award

Insignia
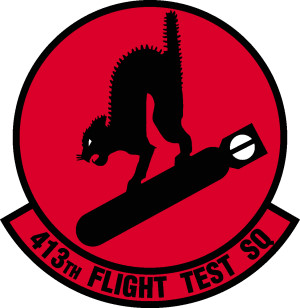
- 413th Flight Test Squadron emblem (Note: Modified 7 November 1995. Description: On disc Light Red-Orange, ringed Black, a stylized black cat, hunched up in fighting stance riding an aerial bomb pointed toward dexter base, all of the last [color mentioned]. Endicott, p. 787.)

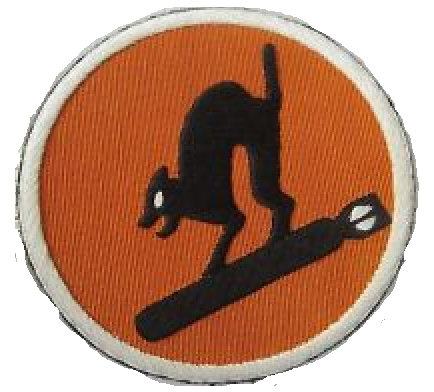
- 413th Bombardment Squadron emblem. (Note: Approved 1 September 1942. Description: On disc light red-orange, bordure white, ringed black, a stylized black cat, hunched up in fighting stance riding an aerial bomb pointed toward dexter base, all of the last [color mentioned]. Maurer, Combat Squadrons, p. 505.)

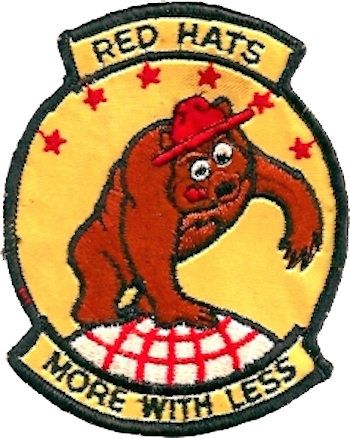
- Patch with 6513th Test Squadron emblem
- World War II fuselage code: MZ

Aircraft flown
- Multirole helicopter: CV-22 Osprey
- Utility helicopter: UH-1 Iroquois
- Transport: MC-130/HC-130 Hercules

The 413th Flight Test Squadron is part of the 96th Test Wing and is based at Hurlburt Field, Florida. It performs flight testing on aircraft used by special operations forces, the Lockheed C-130 Hercules (including AC-130, HC-130 and MC-130), Bell Boeing CV-22 Osprey, Bell UH-1 Huey, and HH-60W Jolly Green II aircraft.

The first predecessor of the squadron was first activated during World War II as the 413th Bombardment Squadron. It served in the European Theater of Operations, where it participated in the strategic bombing campaign against Germany and earned two Distinguished Unit Citations for its combat actions. Following V-E Day, the squadron returned to the United States and was inactivated.

This squadron was again active from 1947 to 1949 in the reserves, although it was apparently never fully manned or equipped. It was active as a Boeing B-47 Stratojet squadron in Strategic Air Command from 1958 to 1962.

The second predecessor of the squadron, the 6513th Test Squadron, was activated in 1977 at Edwards Air Force Base, California. In 1992, the two squadrons were consolidated as the 413th Test Squadron. The squadron was inactivated in 2004, but reactivated the following year at Hurlburt Field, Florida.

== Mission ==
It has planned, executed and managed development and qualification test and evaluation of fixed-wing aircraft assigned to Air Force Special Operations Command and of all United States Air Force helicopters since 2005.

== History ==
=== World War II ===
==== Initial organization and training ====
The first predecessor of the squadron was constituted in January 1942 as the 23d Reconnaissance Squadron, one of the original squadrons of the 96th Bombardment Group. Since a reorganization of General Headquarters Air Force in September 1936, each bombardment group of the Army Air Forces (AAF) had an assigned or attached reconnaissance squadron, which operated the same aircraft as that group's assigned bombardment squadrons. However, before the squadron was activated at Salt Lake City Army Air Base, Utah on 15 July 1942, it was redesignated the 413th Bombardment Squadron.

In early August the squadron moved to Gowen Field, Idaho, where it received its initial cadre, then, later that month to Walla Walla Army Air Base, Washington to begin training with the Boeing B-17 Flying Fortress. On 1 November, the squadron moved to Pocatello Army Air Field, Idaho, where it began to act as a Operational Training Unit. It moved to Pyote Army Air Base, Texas in January 1943 and resumed training for overseas movement.

The air echelon of the squadron began ferrying their B-17s via the North Atlantic ferry route, stopping at Presque Isle Army Air Field, Newfoundland, Iceland, then at Prestwick Airport, Scotland on 4 April 1943. The ground echelon left Pyote on 16 April for Camp Kilmer, New Jersey in the New York Port of Embarkation, sailing on the RMS Queen Elizabeth on 5 May and arriving in Scotland on 13 May.

==== Combat in Europe ====
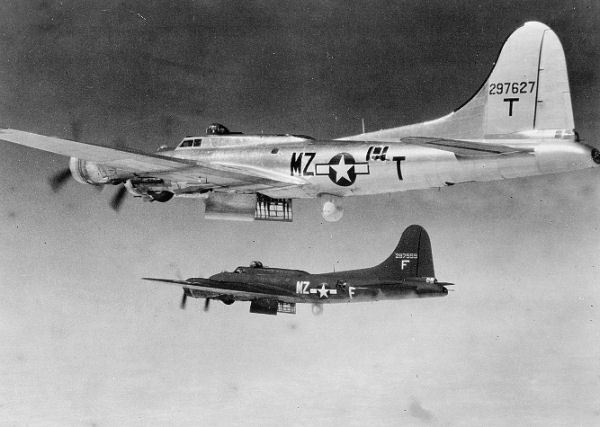
Squadron B-17G Flying Fortress (Note: Aircraft in foreground is Lockheed/Vega built Boeing B-17G-20-VE Flying Fortress, serial 42-97627, Amen. This aircraft went to storage at Kingman Field, Arizona on 22 December 1945 and was sold for scrap in July 1946. Baugher, Joe (19 January 2023). "1942 USAF Serial Numbers". Joe Baugher.)

The squadron was established at RAF Great Saling by 12 May, and flew its first combat mission the next day, an attack against the airfield at Saint-Omer, France. However, the squadron was late assembling and did not complete the mission. The following day, it made its first strike on a target, an airfield at Courtrai. (Note: After action reports described the bombing as "ineffective." However, later intelligence found that damage to the facilities was severe enough to force III/Jagdgeschwader 26 to move from the field. Freeman (1970), p. 47)Eighth Air Force decided to transfer its new Martin B-26 Marauder units from VIII Bomber Command to VIII Air Support Command and concentrate them on bases closer to the European continent. As a result, the 322d Bombardment Group moved to Great Saling on 12 June, forcing the 96th Group and its squadrons to relocate to RAF Snetterton Heath, which would be its combat station for the rest of the war.

The squadron engaged in the strategic bombing campaign against Germany. It attacked airdromes, aircraft factories, harbors, oil refineries, railway yards, shipyards, and other industrial targets in Germany, France, the Netherlands, Belgium, Norway, Poland, Hungary, and Czechoslovakia. Targets included airfields at Bordeaux and Augsburg; marshalling yards at Kiel, Hamm, Braunschweig, and Gdynia; aircraft factories at Chemnitz, Hanover, and Diósgyőr; oil refineries at Merseburg and Most, and chemical works in Wiesbaden, Ludwigshafen, and Neunkirchen

During an attack on the Messerschmitt factory at Regensberg on 17 August 1943, the squadron was without escort after its escorting Republic P-47 Thunderbolts reached the limit of their range. It withstood repeated attacks, first by enemy Messerschmitt Bf 109 and Focke-Wulf Fw 190 interceptors, then by Messerschmitt Bf 110 and Junkers Ju 88 night fighters, to strike its target, earning its first Distinguished Unit Citation (DUC). This was a "shuttle" mission, with the squadron recovering on bases in North Africa, rather than returning to England.

The squadron formed part of the leading 45th Combat Bombardment Wing formation on very long-range mission against the Focke-Wulf Fw 190 factory at Poznań Heavy clouds led an entire wing and some combat boxes of the 45th Wing to abandon the mission and return to England. The 96th Group and one other combat box proceeded to the target and were surprised to find they were able to bomb visually, although the target was defended by intense flak fire, earning the squadron its second DUC. The squadron was assigned a number of B-17s equipped with H2X radar and during the spring of 1944 provided pathfinder aircraft to 3d Bombardment Division before this mission was passed on to the 482d Bombardment Group.

In addition to strategic operations, the squadron participated in air support and interdiction missions. In the preparation for Operation Overlord, the invasion of Normandy, it bombed coastal defenses, railway bridges, gun emplacements, and field batteries in the battle area prior to and during D-Day in June 1944. It attacked enemy positions in support of Operation Cobra the breakout at Saint Lo in July 1944, aiding the campaign in France in August by striking roads and road junctions, and by dropping supplies to the Maquis. During the early months of 1945, it attacked the communications supplying German armies on the western front.

After V-E Day, the 413th flew food missions to the Netherlands and hauled redeployed personnel to French Morocco, Ireland, France, and Germany. The squadron was scheduled for occupation duty, but that plan was cancelled in September 1945. In November 1945 its aircraft were flown back to the United States or transferred to other units in Europe. The unit's remaining personnel returned to the United States aboard the SS Lake Champlain, and it was inactivated at the Port of Embarkation on 19 December 1945.

=== Reserves ===
The squadron was activated in the reserves under Air Defense Command (ADC) at Keesler Field on 17 July 1947, and again assigned to the 96th Group, which was located at Gunter Field, Alabama. In 1948, Continental Air Command (ConAC) assumed responsibility for managing reserve and Air National Guard units from ADC.

The squadron does not appear to have been fully manned or equipped with operational aircraft. In 1949, as ConAC was reorganizing its operational units under the Wing Base Organization system, President Truman's reduced 1949 defense budget required reductions in the number of flying units in the Air Force, and the 413th was inactivated. Reservists at Keesler were transferred to elements of the 8605th Technical Training Wing, which was organized the same day, as a corollary of the active duty 3380th Technical Training Wing. Corollary units were reserve units integrated with an active duty unit. They were viewed as the best method to train reservists by mixing them with an existing regular unit to perform duties alongside the regular unit.

=== Strategic Air Command ===
From 1958, the Boeing B-47 Stratojet wings of Strategic Air Command (SAC) began to assume an alert posture at their home bases, reducing the amount of time spent on alert at overseas bases. The SAC alert cycle divided itself into four parts: planning, flying, alert and rest to meet General Thomas S. Power's initial goal of maintaining one third of SAC's planes on fifteen minute ground alert, fully fueled and ready for combat to reduce vulnerability to a Soviet missile strike. To implement this new system B-47 wings reorganized from three to four squadrons. The 413th was activated at Dyess Air Force Base as the fourth squadron of the 96th Bombardment Wing. The alert commitment was increased to half the squadron's aircraft in 1962 and the four squadron pattern no longer met the alert cycle commitment, so the squadron became non-operational on 1 October 1961 and was inactivated on 1 January 1962.

=== Flight testing ===
The 6513th Flight Test Squadron was activated by Air Force Systems Command at Edwards Air Force Base, California on 1 December 1977 as part of the Air Force Flight Test Center. The squadron took over the personnel and equipment of Project Have Idea from the Special Projects Branch of the 6512th Flight Test Squadron, based at Area 51, also inheriting their nickname "Red Hats". The purpose of the squadron was to perform technical evaluations of foreign military aircraft, primarily Soviet types and their Chinese derivatives. This mission continued at Area 51 under Have Idea until 1986, when the project was renamed Have Phoenix. A related organization, the 4477th Test and Evaluation Squadron ("Red Eagles"), operated a limited range of Soviet-built aircraft types at Tonopah Test Range Airport for the purpose of demonstrating the capabilities of these aircraft to operational squadrons.

In October 1992 the squadron was consolidated with the 413th Squadron and redesignated the 413th Test Squadron. The Red Hats, however, possibly continued to conduct FME projects, apparently as an unnumbered squadron at an undisclosed location in Nevada. The 413th performed flight testing of electronic warfare assets at Edwards. It was inactivated on 6 May 2004. Its remaining personnel and assets were transferred to Electronic Warfare Directorate North Base.

The squadron was activated at Hurlburt Field, Florida in February 2005 to provide flight testing of special operations aircraft and helicopters under the 46th Test Wing. In July 2012, the 46th Wing was inactivated and its assets, including the squadron, transferred to the 96th Air Base Wing, which became the 96th Test Wing in July 2012.

== Lineage ==
413th Bombardment Squadron

- Constituted as the 23d Reconnaissance Squadron (Heavy) on 28 January 1942

Redesignated 413th Bombardment Squadron (Heavy) on 22 April 1942
Activated on 15 July 1942
Redesignated 413th Bombardment Squadron, Heavy on 20 August 1943
Inactivated on 19 December 1945
Redesignated 413th Bombardment Squadron, Very Heavy on 3 July 1947
Activated in the reserve on 17 July 1947
Inactivated on 27 June 1949
Redesignated 413th Bombardment Squadron, Medium on 20 August 1958
Activated on 1 November 1958
Discontinued and inactivated, on 1 January 1962
Consolidated with the 6513th Test Squadron as the 6513th Test Squadron on 1 October 1992

413th Flight Test Squadron
Designated as the 6513th Test Squadron and activated on 1 December 1977
Consolidated with the 413th Bombardment Squadron on 1 October 1992
Redesignated 413th Test Squadron on 2 October 1992
Redesignated 413th Flight Test Squadron on 1 March 1994
Inactivated on 6 May 2004
Activated on 25 February 2005

=== Assignments ===
- 96th Bombardment Group, 15 July 1942 – 19 December 1945
- 96th Bombardment Group, 17 July 1947 – 27 June 1949
- 96th Bombardment Wing, 1 November 1958 – 1 January 1962
- Air Force Flight Test Center, 1 December 1977
- 6510th Test Wing (later 412th Test Wing), 1 March 1978
- 412th Operations Group, 1 October 1993 – 6 May 2004
- 46th Operations Group, 25 February 2005 – 18 July 2012
- 96th Operations Group, 18 July 2012 – present

=== Stations ===
- Salt Lake City Army Air Base, Utah, 15 July 1942
- Gowen Field, Idaho, 6 August 1942
- Walla Walla Army Air Base, Washington, 16 August 1942
- Rapid City Army Air Base, South Dakota, 29 September 1942
- Pocatello Army Air Field, Idaho, 1 November 1942
- Pyote Army Air Base, Texas, 3 January – 16 April 1943
- RAF Great Saling (AAF-485), England, 12 May 1943

- RAF Snetterton Heath (AAF-138), England, 12 June 1943 – 11 December 1945
- Camp Kilmer, New Jersey, 17–19 December 1945
- Keesler Field (later Keesler Air Force Base), Mississippi, 17 July 1947 – 27 June 1949
- Dyess Air Force Base, Texas, 1 November 1958 – 1 January 1962
- Edwards Air Force Base, California, 1 December 1977 – 6 May 2004
- Hurlburt Field, Florida, 25 February 2005

=== Aircraft ===
- Boeing B-17 Flying Fortress, 1942–1945
- Boeing B-47 Stratojet, 1958–1961
- Lockheed C-130 Hercules, 2005–present
- MH-53 Pave Low, 2005–2008
- Bell UH-1 Iroquois, 2005–present
- HH-60 Pave Hawk, 2005–present
- CV-22 Osprey, 2007–present
- Lockheed HC-130J Combat King II, 2010–present
- MC-130J Commando II, 2011–present
- Lockheed AC-130J Ghostrider, 2014–present
- HH-60W Jolly Green II, 2019–present

=== Awards and campaigns ===
| Award streamer | Award | Dates | Notes |
|---|---|---|---|
| | Distinguished Unit Citation | 17 August 1943 | Germany 413th Bombardment Squadron |
| | Distinguished Unit Citation | 9 April 1944 | Poznan, Poland 413th Bombardment Squadron |
| | Air Force Outstanding Unit Award | 1 January 1959-31 December 1960 | 413th Bombardment Squadron |
| | Air Force Outstanding Unit Award | 1 January 1979-31 December 1980 | 6513th Test Squadron |
| | Air Force Outstanding Unit Award | 1 January 1983-31 December 1984 | 6513th Test Squadron |
| | Air Force Outstanding Unit Award | 1 January 1997-31 December 1998 | 413th Flight Test Squadron |
| | Air Force Outstanding Unit Award | 1 January-31 December 2005 | 413th Flight Test Squadron |
| | Air Force Outstanding Unit Award | 1 January-31 December 2006 | 413th Flight Test Squadron |
| | Air Force Outstanding Unit Award | 1 January-31 December 2008 | 413th Flight Test Squadron |
| | Air Force Outstanding Unit Award | 1 January-31 December 2009 | 413th Flight Test Squadron |
| | Air Force Outstanding Unit Award | 1 January-31 December 2010 | 413th Flight Test Squadron |
| | Air Force Outstanding Unit Award | 1 January-31 December 2011 | 413th Flight Test Squadron |
| | Air Force Outstanding Unit Award | 1 January 2014-31 December 2015 | 413th Flight Test Squadron |
| | Air Force Outstanding Unit Award | 1 January 2017-31 December 2018 | 413th Flight Test Squadron |

| Campaign Streamer | Campaign | Dates | Notes |
|---|---|---|---|
| | Air Offensive, Europe | 4 July 1942 – 5 June 1944 | 413th Bombardment Squadron |
| | Air Combat, EAME Theater | 7 December 1941 – 11 May 1945 | 413th Bombardment Squadron |
| | Normandy | 6 June 1944 – 24 July 1944 | 413th Bombardment Squadron |
| | Northern France | 25 July 1944 – 14 September 1944 | 413th Bombardment Squadron |
| | Rhineland | 15 September 1944 – 21 March 1945 | 413th Bombardment Squadron |
| | Ardennes-Alsace | 16 December 1944 – 25 January 1945 | 413th Bombardment Squadron |
| | Central Europe | 22 March 1944 – 21 May 1945 | 413th Bombardment Squadron |

== See also ==
- List of United States Air Force test squadrons
- B-17 Flying Fortress units of the United States Army Air Forces
- List of B-47 units of the United States Air Force
- List of C-130 Hercules operators
