= 1 FTS =

1 FTS may refer to:

- 1st Flying Training Squadron, US
- No. 1 Flying Training School RAF, UK
- No. 1 Flying Training School RAAF, Australia
