= 367th Bombardment Squadron =

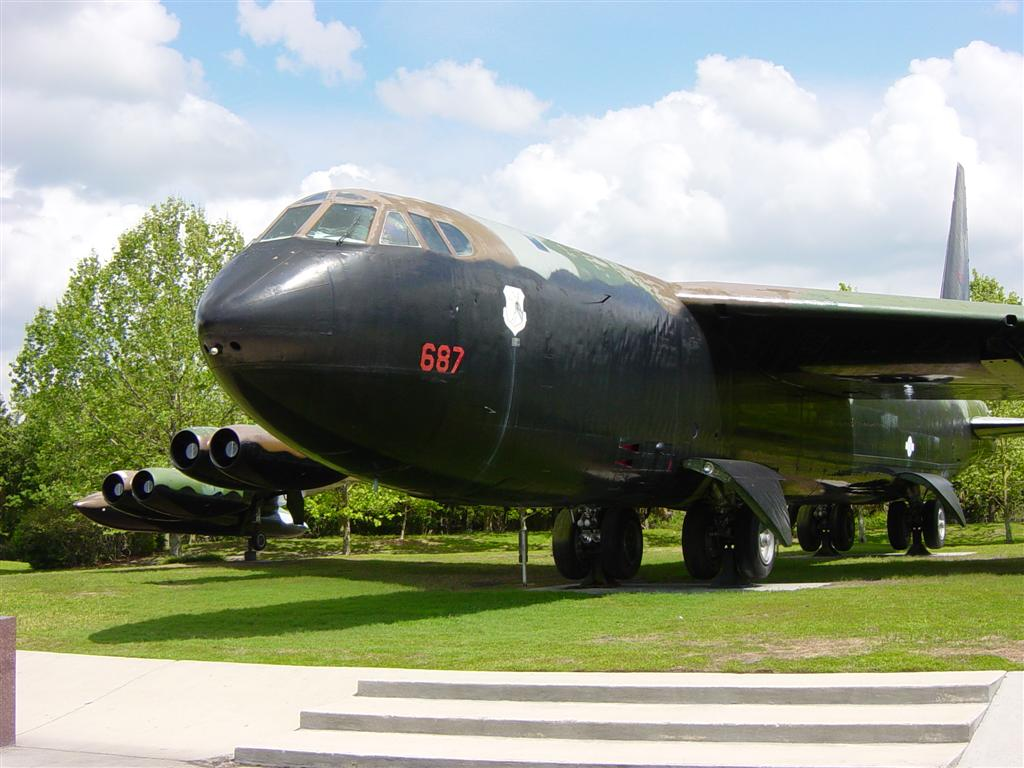
- Former squadron B-52D on display at the B-52 Memorial Park (Note: Aircraft is Boeing B-52D-40-BW Stratofortress, serial 56-687.)
- Active: 1942–1946; 1947–1974
- Country: United States
- Branch: United States Air Force
- Role: Strategic bomber
- Motto: Paratus Pro Retaliato (Latin for 'Prepared to Retaliate')
- Engagements: European Theater of Operations
- Decorations: Distinguished Unit Citation; Air Force Outstanding Unit Award

Insignia
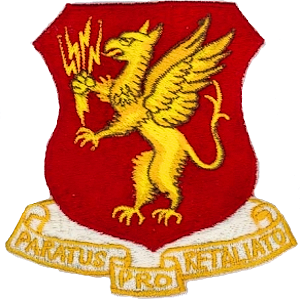
- Patch with 367th Bombardment Squadron emblem (Note: Approved 7 August 1953. Description: Gules, a griffin sejeant, holding in his dexter claw a lightning bolt of four flashes or.)

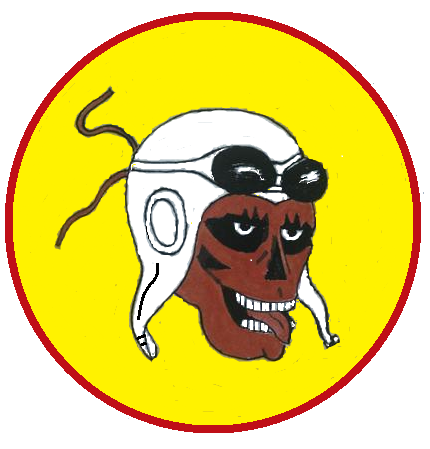
- 367th Bombardment Squadron emblem (World War II)
- World War II squadron fuselage code: GY

The 367th Bombardment Squadron is an inactive unit of the United States Air Force, last stationed at McCoy Air Force Base, Florida, where it was inactivated on 1 July 1974.

The squadron was first activated in the spring of 1942, one of the original four squadrons of the 306th Bombardment Group. After training with Boeing B-17 Flying Fortresses, the squadron moved overseas and participated in the strategic bombing campaign against Germany, earning two Distinguished Unit Citations for its efforts. After the war the 367th remained in Europe with the occupation forces until inactivating in 1946.

It was activated again in 1947 as a medium bomber unit at MacDill Air Force Base, where it became one of the first units to receive the jet Boeing B-47 Stratojet bomber. As the B-47 was being withdrawn from service, the squadron moved on paper to McCoy in April 1963, where it assumed the personnel and Boeing B-52 Stratofortresses of another squadron, which was inactivated.

== History ==
=== World War II ===
==== Initial organization and training ====
The squadron was first established in March 1942 at Gowen Field, Idaho, as the 367th Bombardment Squadron, one of the original four squadrons of the 306th Bombardment Group. In April, its personnel moved to Wendover Field, Utah, where it began training with Boeing B-17 Flying Fortress heavy bombers. On 1 August 1942, the squadron's ground echelon began its deployment, spending a week at Richmond Army Air Base, Virginia before moving to Fort Dix, New Jersey at the Port of Embarkation. It sailed on the RMS Queen Elizabeth on 30 August, arriving in Scotland on 5 September 1942. The air echelon departed for Westover Field, Massachusetts, and began ferrying their B-17s to England via the North Atlantic ferrying route.

==== Combat in Europe ====
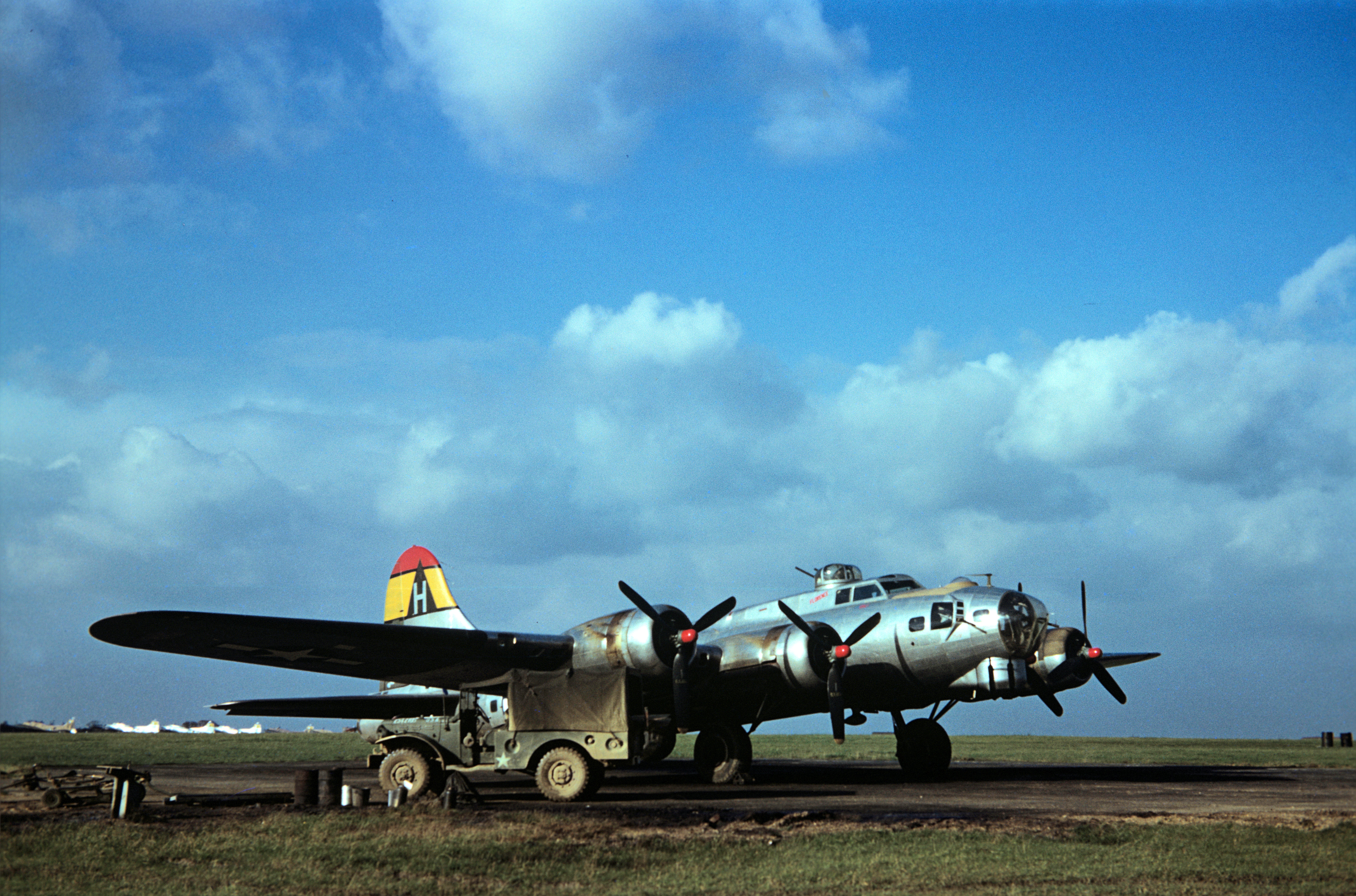
306th Bombardment Group B-17 Flying Fortress at RAF Thurleigh

The squadron settled into its combat station, RAF Thurleigh, England, in early September. Although several bomber units arrived in England before the 367th, when these units left England to participate in Operation Torch it became, along with its companion squadrons of the 306th Group, the oldest bombardment squadrons of VIII Bomber Command. It few its first combat mission on 9 October 1942 against a steel factory near Lille, France, but with poor results. This was the first mission on which VIII Bomber Command assembled a strike force of over 100 bombers. (Note: With the departure of units to North Africa in Operation Torch, it would be six months before VIII Bomber Command could duplicate this feat. Freeman, p. 18.) The squadron operated primarily against strategic targets, including the locomotive factory at Lille, marshalling yards at Rouen, France, and Stuttgart, Germany. The squadron took part in the first strike into Germany by bombers of Eighth Air Force on 27 January 1943 when it struck U-boat yards at Wilhelmshaven. It struck shipbuilding yards at Vegesack, ball bearing plants at Schweinfurt, the aircraft factory at Leipzig, Germany, and similar facilities.

On 11 January 1944, the squadron participated in an attack on an aircraft plant in central Germany, near Brunswick. Extensive cloud cover had resulted in the recall of two of the three bombardment divisions involved in the mission and made the rendezvous of the fighter groups scheduled to provide cover in the target area difficult. In contrast, clear weather to the east of the target permitted the Germans to assemble one of the largest fighter formations since October 1943, with 207 enemy fighters making contact with the strike force. For this mission, the squadron was awarded the Distinguished Unit Citation (DUC). The following month the squadron earned a second DUC for its performance during Big Week, an intensive bombing campaign against the German aircraft industry. Despite adverse weather on 22 February that led supporting elements to abandon the mission the squadron and group effectively bombed the aircraft assembly plant at Bernburg, Germany.

The squadron also performed in a tactical role, assisting ground forces Operation Cobra, the St Lo breakthrough, Operation Market Garden, the attempt to establish a bridgehead across the Rhine near Arnhem in the Netherlands, stopping German attacking forces in the Battle of the Bulge, and bombing enemy positions during Operation Varsity, the airborne assault across the Rhine in the spring of 1945.

After V-E Day, the squadron became part of the occupation forces and participated in Project Casey Jones, the photographic mapping of portions of Europe and North Africa. The 306th Group began to phase out of the project in July. In February 1946, the squadron moved to Istres-Le Tubé Air Base, France, where it absorbed elements of the inactivating 92d and 384th Bombardment Groups, returning to Germany in July. The squadron was inactivated in December 1946.

=== Strategic Air Command ===
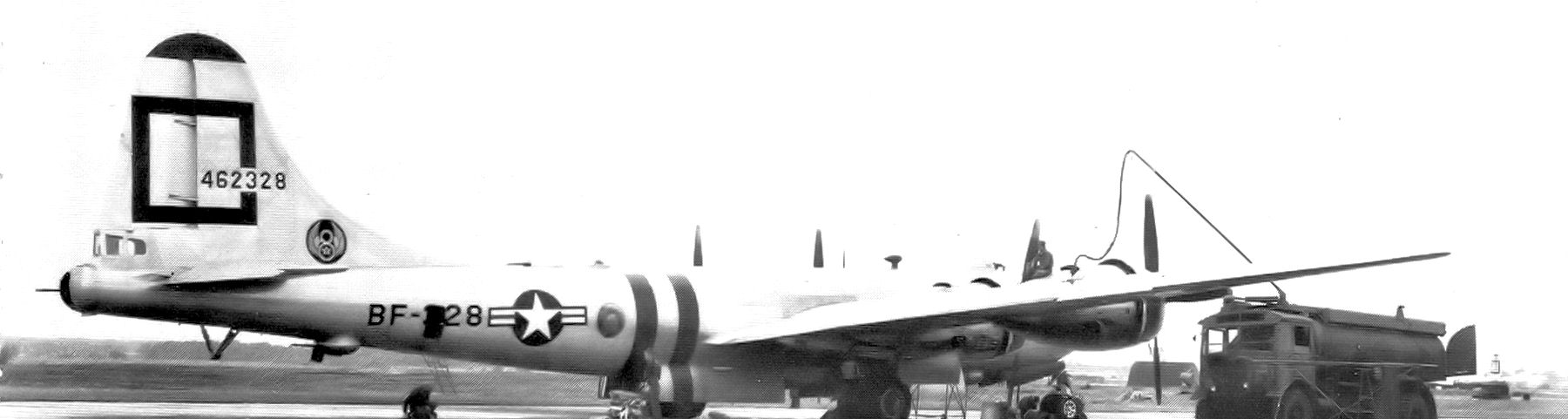
B-29A Superfortress from MacDill AFB

The squadron was reactivated as a Strategic Air Command (SAC) unit at Andrews Field in July 1947. In August 1948, it moved to MacDill Air Force Base, Florida, and began to equip with Boeing B-29 Superfortresses. As SAC bombers began to participate in the Korean War, in September 1950, the squadron began providing transition training for SAC aircrews on the B-29. This training mission continued until February 1951. The squadron also operated Boeing B-50 Superfortress, an advanced version of the B-29 during this period.

==== B-47 Stratojet operations ====
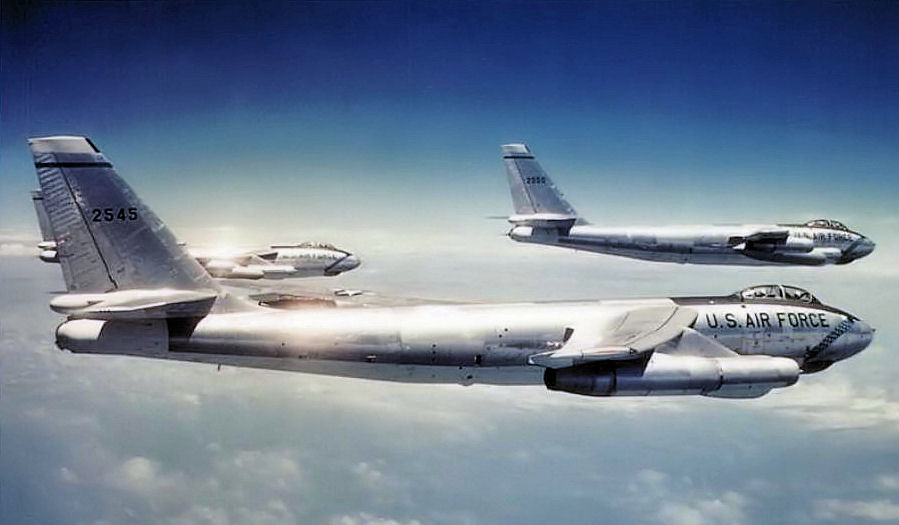
B-47Es of the 306th Bombardment Wing

The 306th Bombardment Wing was the first Boeing B-47 Stratojet wing in SAC. The squadron began receiving B-47A Stratojets in May 1951. The squadron would not only train itself on the new bomber, but until December, when Air Training Command assumed the mission, the 306th Wing trained all B-47 aircrew. The B-47As lacked armament and only some even had fully operational bombardment and navigation systems installed. They were not considered operational aircraft and were relegated to training. In October 1952, the squadron began to receive B-47Bs. With the improved version of the Stratojet, the squadron was involved for the next year in developing tactics and procedures for the new jet bomber.

The squadron deployed with the 305th Wing to RAF Fairford from September to December 1953 and to Ben Guerir Air Base, Morocco from January to February 1955 and from October 1956 to January 1957.

From 1958, SAC's B-47 squadrons began to assume an alert posture at their home bases, reducing the amount of time spent on alert at overseas bases. General Thomas S. Power set an initial goal of maintaining one third of SAC’s planes on fifteen minute ground alert, fully fueled and ready for combat to reduce vulnerability to a Soviet missile strike. During the 1958 Lebanon Crisis, the United States deployed tactical forces in Operation Blue Bat. Meanwhile, in a show of force, SAC brought additional bombers to an increased alert status for five days in July. The squadron's alert commitment was increased to half the squadron's aircraft in 1962.

In October 1962, soon after the detection of Soviet missiles in Cuba, SAC began to disperse its B-47 force. However, MacDill was soon to become saturated with tactical forces, and SAC withdrew all forces there. The squadron's B-47s moved to Hunter Air Force Base, Georgia on 21 October, except for bombers on alert, which left the next day in Operation Riders Up. Bombers carried nuclear weapons in ferrying configuration. On 24 October SAC went to DEFCON 2, placing all squadron aircraft on alert. On 27 November SAC returned to normal alert posture and began coordinating the return of squadron planes to MacDill. The squadron began to phase down in preparation for inactivation and was not operational after 3 January 1963. However, rather than inactivating, the unit moved on paper in April 1963.

==== B-52 Stratofortress operations ====
SAC had dispersed its Boeing B-52 Stratofortress force to smaller wings with 15 bombers. This not only complicated Soviet targeting planning, but with more runways, it would take less time to launch the bomber force. As part of this plan, it organized the 4047th Strategic Wing at McCoy Air Force Base, Florida on 1 July 1961. The 4047th was a Major Command controlled (MAJCON) wing, which could not carry a permanent history or lineage, and SAC decided to replace it with the 306th Bombardment Wing, a permanent unit. The squadron moved to McCoy with the wing, and assumed the mission, personnel and equipment of the 4047th Wing's 347th Bombardment Squadron.

The squadron maintained combat proficiency with its B-52s. Its ground alert commitment remained at half the squadron's planes, SAC also disclosed it was maintaining an airborne force of B-52s for "airborne alert training" in Operation Chrome Dome." Accidents at Palomares in January 1966 and Thule in January 1968 contributed to the end of Chrome Dome, as did rapidly rising costs of the programs and the use of strategic bombers for non-nuclear missions, but the primary reason for ending the operation was the availability of a survivable intercontinental ballistic missile force. (Note: This alert status was not uniform through the command. Wings committed to Operation Arc Light had no alert bombers, while undeployed wings maintained normal alert status. Which category a specific wing fell into varied over time.) In addition, the squadron did not maintain alert during periods in which it deployed most or all of its personnel and aircraft to Southeast Asia. Even when bombers were available for alert, crews had rotated to the combat zone and they could not be manned.

On 31 March 1972, a squadron B-52D suffered multiple engine failures shortly after taking off from McCoy on a training mission. While attempting to return for an emergency landing, the plane crashed in a residential area 3,220 feet (980 m) from the end of the runway, burning a two block area. All seven crewmembers and one civilian died and several others were injured in what was the worst aviation disaster in Central Florida history. (Note: The squadron had earlier lost a B-52 that suffered an emergency shortly after takeoff for a training mission on 28 August 1968. All crewmembers except for the aircraft commander immediately ejected. He remained with the plane to steer it away from residential areas, ejecting just before the plane crashed on a remote area of Patrick Air Force Base. Allen, George (1968). "Air Force Opens B52 Crash Probe" (PDF). Vol. LI, no. 115. The Evening Tribune..)

The Air Force was engaged in a phaseout program that called for the retirement of the B-52C and of several subsequent B-52 models. In this drawdown, the squadron was not operational after 1 November 1973, and was inactivated on 1 July 1974 as the Air Force closed McCoy.

== Lineage ==
- Constituted as the 367th Bombardment Squadron (Heavy) on 28 January 1942

Activated on 1 March 1942
Redesignated 367th Bombardment Squadron, Heavy on 20 August 1943
Inactivated on 25 December 1946
Redesignated 367th Bombardment Squadron, Very Heavy on 11 June 1947
Activated on 1 July 1947
Redesignated 367th Bombardment Squadron, Medium on 11 August 1948
Redesignated 367th Bombardment Squadron, Heavy on 1 April 1963.
Inactivated on 1 July 1974

=== Assignments ===
- 306th Bombardment Group, 1 March 1942 – 25 December 1946
- 306th Bombardment Group, 1 July 1947 (attached to 306th Bombardment Wing after 10 February 1951)
- 306th Bombardment Wing, 16 June 1952 – 1 July 1974

=== Stations ===
- Gowen Field, Idaho, 1 March 1942
- Wendover Field, Utah, c. 6 April–1 August 1942
- RAF Thurleigh (Station 111), England, c. 6 September 1942 (detachments operated from Lajes Field, Azores, 20 August–October 1945; Dakar Airport, French West Africa, September 1945; Marrakech Airport, French Morocco, October 1945)
- AAF Station Giebelstadt (Y-90), Germany, 25 December 1945
- Istres-Le Tubé Air Base (Station 196) (Y-17), France, 26 February 1946
- AAF Station Fürstenfeldbruck (R-72), Germany, 16 August 1946
- AAF Station Lechfeld (R-71), Germany, 13 September – 25 December 1946
- Andrews Field (later Andrews Air Force Base), Maryland, 1 July 1947
- MacDill Air Force Base, Florida, 1 August 1948
- McCoy Air Force Base, Florida, 1 April 1963 – 1 July 1974

=== Aircraft ===
- Boeing B-17 Flying Fortress, 1942–1946
- Boeing B-29 Superfortress, 1948–1951
- Boeing B-50 Superfortress, 1950–1951
- Boeing B-47 Stratojet, 1951–1963
- Boeing B-52 Stratofortress, 1963–1973

=== Awards and campaigns ===
Award streamer	Award	Dates	Notes
	Distinguished Unit Citation	11 January 1944	Germany
	Distinguished Unit Citation	22 February 1944	Germany
	Air Force Outstanding Unit Award	22 January 1953–8 December 1956	
	Air Force Outstanding Unit Award	1 September 1969–4 April 1970	
	Vietnamese Gallantry Cross with Palm	1 September 1969–4 April 1970	

Campaign Streamer	Campaign	Dates	Notes
	Air Offensive, Europe	c. 6 September 1942–5 June 1944	
	Air Combat, EAME Theater	c. 6 September 1942–11 May 1945	
	Normandy	6 June 1944–24 July 1944	
	Northern France	25 July 1944–14 September 1944	
	Rhineland	15 September 1944–21 March 1945	
	Ardennes-Alsace	16 December 1944–25 January 1945	
	Central Europe	22 March 1944–21 May 1945	

== See also ==
- List of B-29 Superfortress operators
- List of B-47 units of the United States Air Force
- List of B-50 units of the United States Air Force
- List of B-52 units of the United States Air Force
