= 306th Strategic Wing =

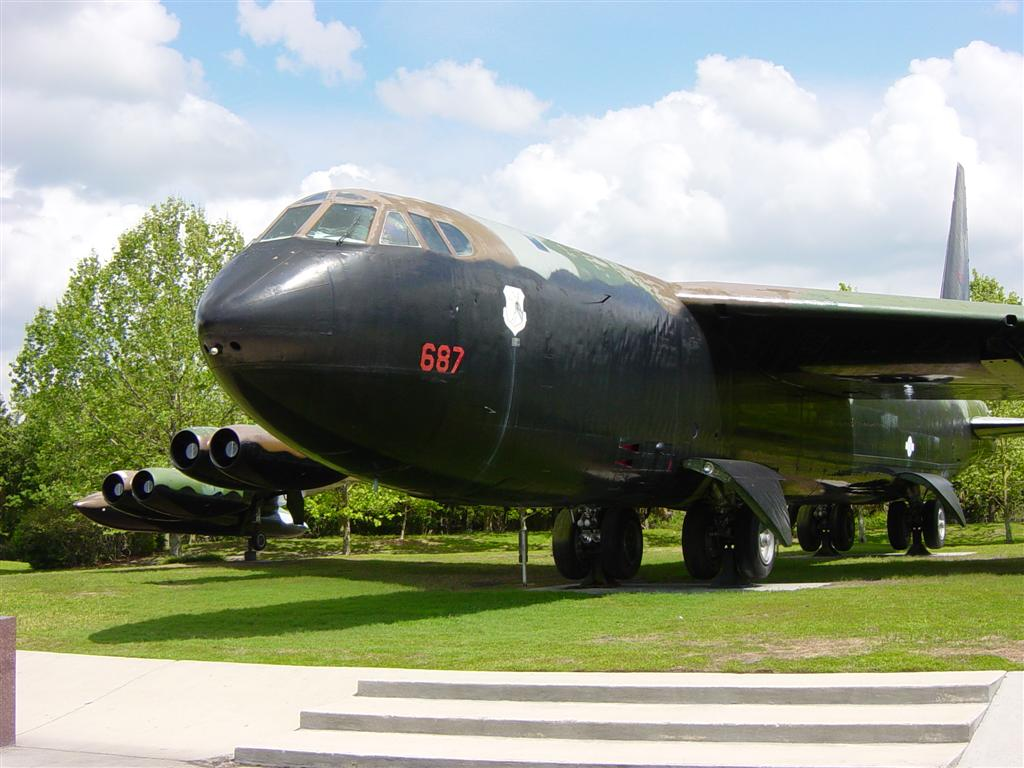
- B-52D Stratofortress on display at B-52 Memorial Park, Orlando International Airport, Florida, the former McCoy Air Force Base.
- Active: 1950–1974; 1976–1990
- Country: United States
- Branch: United States Air Force
- Role: Command and control of rotational SAC aircraft
- Motto: Abundance of Strength
- Decorations: Air Force Outstanding Unit Award

Insignia
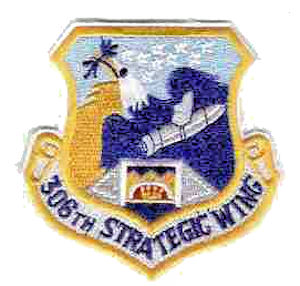
- Patch with 306th Strategic Wing emblem (Note: Approved 10 November 1977.)

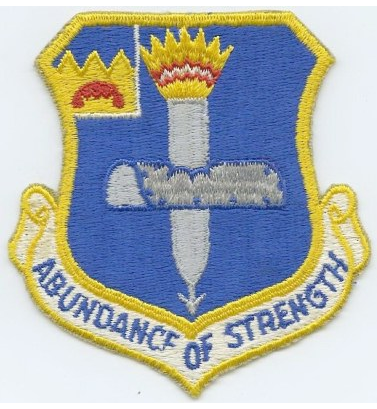
- Patch with 306th Bombardment Wing emblem (Note: Approved 2 October 1951.)
- World War II tail marking: Triangle H

The 306th Strategic Wing, previously the 306th Bombardment Wing, is an inactive United States Air Force unit. It was last assigned to the Strategic Air Command at RAF Mildenhall, Suffolk and was inactivated on 1 February 1992. The wing's mission was to coordinate all SAC air refueling and reconnaissance resources in the European Theater with the United States Air Forces in Europe (USAFE). It assumed the mission of the 98th Strategic Wing when that unit was inactivated in 1976.

During the Cold War, Strategic Air Command (SAC) initially established the 306th Bombardment Wing as a Boeing B-29 Superfortress medium bombardment wing at MacDill Air Force Base, Florida in 1950. It later flew Boeing B-50 Superfortress, Boeing KC-97 Stratofreighter and Boeing B-47 Stratojet aircraft at MacDill.

The wing moved to McCoy Air Force Base, Florida in 1963, where it was a redesignated as a heavy bombardment wing flying Boeing B-52 Stratofortress and Boeing KC-135A and KC-135Q Stratotanker aircraft. The 306th forward deployed to Southeast Asia during the Vietnam War in the 1960s and 1970s. As a result of post-Vietnam reductions in force, the wing was inactivated in late 1974 with the closure of McCoy.

the 306th was activated once again as the 306th Strategic Wing at Ramstein Air Base, West Germany, assuming operational control for SAC air refueling and reconnaissance resources in the European Theater. In 1978, the 306th moved to RAF Mildenhall, United Kingdom. For most of this period the 306th controlled KC-135, McDonnell Douglas KC-10 Extender, Boeing RC-135 Rivet Joint, Lockheed SR-71 and Lockheed U-2 aircraft deployed from the United States to the United Kingdom. In 1992 it was inactivated and its mission transferred to the 100th Air Refueling Wing under United States Air Forces in Europe.

== History ==
=== B-47 Stratojet era ===
The wing activated as the 306th Bombardment Wing, Medium on 1 September 1950 at MacDill Air Force Base, Florida. Upon activation, the 306th Bombardment Group, already stationed at MacDill, was assigned as its operational component, but four months later the group's flying squadrons were attached directly to the wing after and it became a paper organization. The wing was initially equipped with Boeing B-29 Superfortresses and acted as Strategic Air Command (SAC)'s B-29 crew training organization. In 1951, the 306th received some Boeing B-50A Superfortresses from the 43d Bombardment Wing at Davis–Monthan Air Force Base, Arizona to supplement the B-29s but used them for non-operational training flights.

The wing began upgrading to the jet age with the arrival of the new Boeing B-47A Stratojet swept-wing medium bomber. The B-47As, however, were essentially identical to the XB-47 prototype tested by Air Materiel Command and were intended to act as training aircraft to prepare future B-47B crews. The B-47As were not considered combat ready, since most of them were unarmed and were initially without almost any of their vital electronic components. Deliveries of the B-47A to the USAF began in December 1950, and the aircraft entered service in May 1951 with the wing at MacDill. On 19 November 1951, the 306th received its first operational Boeing B-47B and christened it "The Real McCoy" in honor of Colonel Michael N. W. McCoy, the 306th's wing commander, who flew it from the Boeing Wichita plant to MacDill.

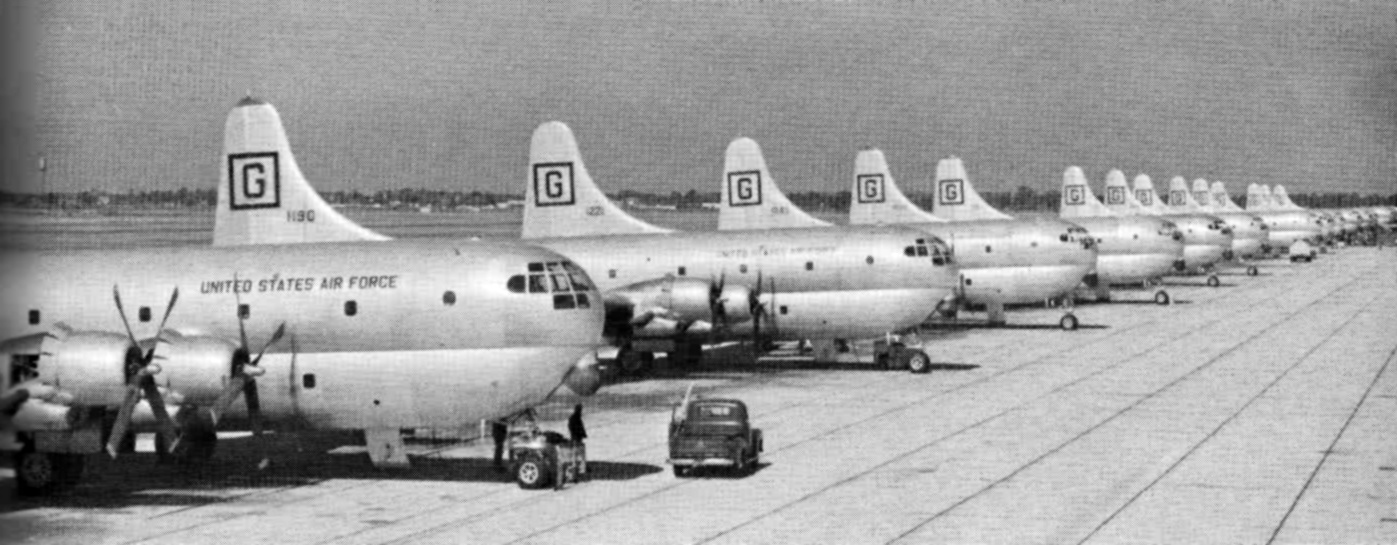
KC-97Es of the 306th Air Refueling Squadron at MacDill AFB

The first Boeing KC-97E Stratofreighter air refueling aircraft assigned to Strategic Air Command was delivered to the wing's 306th Air Refueling Squadron at MacDill on 14 July 1951 and inflight refueling operations started in May 1952, with KC-97s refueling B-47s on operational training missions leading toward combat ready status. B-47Bs from the 306th Bomb Wing began a 90-day rotational training mission to RAF Fairford, Gloucestershire, in June 1953, marking the first overseas deployment of the B-47. Further overseas deployments by the entire wing followed in January 1955, October 1956, and October 1957 to Ben Guerir Air Base, Morocco. For its role in advancing jet bombardment tactics, the wing was awarded its first Air Force Outstanding Unit Award (AFOUA).

During this period, the 306th also figured prominently in the filming of the 1955 Paramount Pictures movie, Strategic Air Command starring James Stewart and June Allyson. The film was made with the full cooperation of the Air Force, with significant filming occurring at MacDill utilizing B-47 aircraft of both the 306th Bombardment Wing and the collocated 305th Bombardment Wing. In the film's plot Stewart's character is assigned to fly B-47s as a vice wing commander at MacDill.

In 1959 the wing added a fourth bombardment squadron, the 423d Bombardment Squadron as SAC's B-47 force reached its peak of twenty-seven wings. However, the B-47 soon began to be phased out of SAC's strategic arsenal. The wing began phasing down, with the 423d becoming non-operational in 1961 and the 369th in early 1963. The wing began sending aircraft to Davis–Monthan inventory beginning in late 1962 in anticipation of the wing's planned inactivation. However, inactivation plans were cancelled and the wing moved to replace the 4047th Strategic Wing instead.

=== B-52 Stratofortress era ===
As the Boeing B-52 Stratofortress replaced the B-47, the 306th Bombardment was redesignated as the 306th Bombardment Wing, Heavy and moved on paper from MacDill to McCoy Air Force Base, Florida on 1 April 1963, where it replaced the 4047th Strategic Wing.

4047th Strategic Wing

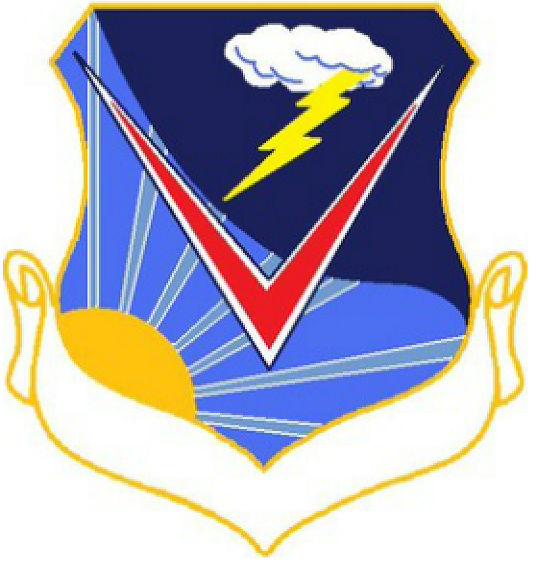
4047th Strategic Wing emblem

The 4047th was organized on 1 July 1961 as a tenant of the 321st Bombardment Wing (BW) and assigned to the 823d Air Division at McCoy as part of SAC's plan to disperse its Boeing B-52 Stratofortress heavy bombers over a larger number of bases, thus making it more difficult for the Soviet Union to knock out the entire fleet with a surprise first strike. In September 1961 the 347th Bombardment Squadron, consisting of 15 Boeing B-52 Stratofortresses moved to McCoy from Westover Air Force Base, Massachusetts where it had been one of the three squadrons of the 99th Bombardment Wing. One third of the wing's aircraft were maintained on fifteen-minute alert, fully fueled, armed and ready for combat to reduce vulnerability to a Soviet missile strike. This was increased to half the wing's aircraft in 1962. The 4047th (and later the 306th) continued to maintain an alert commitment until the 306th was inactivated.

Later that same month, the 4047th became the host for McCoy when the 321st Bombardment Wing inactivated and transferred the 813th Medical Group to the wing, along with 39th Munitions Maintenance Squadron to oversee the wing's special weapons. The 4047th became fully organized on 1 July 1962 when the 306th Air Refueling Squadron moved to McCoy from MacDill and began converting to Boeing KC-135 Stratotankers. In 1962, the wing's bombers began to be equipped with the GAM-77 Hound Dog and the GAM-72 Quail air-launched cruise missiles, The 4047th Airborne Missile Maintenance Squadron was activated in November to maintain these missiles.

However, SAC strategic wings could not carry a permanent history or lineage and SAC looked for a way to make its Strategic Wings permanent. In 1962, Headquarters SAC received authority from Headquarters USAF to discontinue its Major Command controlled (MAJCON) strategic wings that were equipped with combat aircraft and to replace them with Air Force controlled (AFCON) units, which could carry a lineage and history. (Note: MAJCON units could not carry a permanent history or lineage. Ravenstein. A Guide to Air Force Lineage and Honors, p.12.)

306th Bombardment Wing As a result, the 4047th was replaced by the 306th Bombardment Wing, which assumed its mission, personnel, and equipment on 1 April 1963. (Note: The 306th Wing continued, through temporary bestowal, the history and honors of the World War II 306th Bombardment Group. It was also entitled to retain the honors (but not the history or lineage) of the 4047th.) In the same way the 367th Bombardment Squadron, one of the unit's World War II historical bomb squadrons, replaced the 347th BS. The 813d Medical Group, 39th Munitions Maintenance Squadron and the 306th Air Refueling Squadron were reassigned to the 306th. Component support units were replaced by units with numerical designation of the 306th. Under the Dual Deputate organization, (Note: Under this plan flying squadrons reported to the wing Deputy Commander for Operations and maintenance squadrons reported to the wing Deputy Commander for Maintenance.)} all flying and maintenance squadrons were directly assigned to the wing, so no operational group was activated, although the 306th Combat Support Group became the wing's administrative support unit. Each of the new units assumed the personnel, equipment, and mission of its predecessor.

Immediately after the move to McCoy, the 306th began transitioning to the B-52D version of the Stratofortress during the spring and summer of 1963 and assumed strategic nuclear alert duties under SAC's Operation Chrome Dome airborne alert program. Under this program, each SAC bomb wing was periodically tasked, for a specified period of time, to maintain a portion of its bombers airborne and ready to strike. On 16 November 1963, two of eight ground alert lines maintained by the wing's 367th BS were converted to airborne alert lines. Two B-52Ds were flown in cell along the southern Chrome Dome route across Spain to the Mediterranean every day until 31 December 1963. Each B-52D required two air refuelings inbound to Spain and two more outbound over the Mediterranean, with mission duration averaging 25 to 27 hours in length. The 306th Air Refueling Squadron ground alert was also degraded to support Chrome Dome refueling along the southern route.

The 306th was tasked to maintain airborne alert several more times until the wing deployed to support conventional bombing operations in Southeast Asia in 1966. Ground alert was reinstated at the SAC directed 50 percent of aircraft assigned rate after each Chrome Dome period. In January 1964, KC-135 tanker crews changed to seven-day alert tours while B-52 bomber crews maintained a three-four-day cycle. One additional tanker alert line was added for a total of nine. During the 1960s and 1970s, the 306th served as the host wing for numerous iterations of the annual SAC Bombing and Navigation Competition held at McCoy.

Beginning in September 1966, the 306 BW also began routinely deploying bombers to Southeast Asia as part of Operation Arc Light, Operation Linebacker and Operation Linebacker II operations in Southeast Asia, deploying at various times to Andersen Air Force Base, Guam and Kadena Air Base, Okinawa. As part of Operation Young Tiger, it also deployed tankers to these bases and to U-Tapao Royal Thai Navy Airfield, Thailand. At times these deployments depleted all wing resources remaining at McCoy.

The 919th Air Refueling Squadron moved to McCoy in March 1967. When not forward deployed for operations over Vietnam, the 306th continued to operate out of McCoy for both training and nuclear alert role. In January 1968, the 306 BW received another AFOUA for this "double-duty" for combat operations in Southeast Asia while maintaining an alert status for SAC.

On 19 November 1968 a B-52, serial 55-0103 attached to the 4252d Strategic Wing and flown by a 306th Wing crew burned and exploded after its jet engines experienced a power failure upon takeoff at Kadena Air Base, Okinawa while preparing to conduct a bombing mission to Vietnam. The Pilot/Commander, Capt Charles D. Miller (USAF), one of two who later died of burns, was able to keep the plane on the ground. Had the plane become airborne, it would likely have crashed 1/4-mile north of the runway into a storage area for chemical weapons, where B28 nuclear bombs used in AGM-28 Hound Dog cruise missiles and where W31 nuclear tipped MGR-1 Honest John were stored, and MIM-14 Nike-Hercules nuclear and MIM-23 Hawk conventional anti-aircraft missile launch sites were located. The burning and exploding 30,000 pounds of 24, 500 lb bombs, (12 under each wing) and 24, 750 lb bombs in the belly bomb bays created a blast was so powerful that it blew a crater under the aircraft some thirty feet deep and sixty feet across and blew out the windows in the dispensary at Naha AB, twenty-three miles away.

While deployed to Andersen during Linebacker II operations on 21–22 December 1972, the 306th sustained a combat loss when B-52D, serail 56-0669, callsign "Straw 2", was hit by a surface-to-air missile after attacking the Gia Lam railway repair shops east of Hanoi. Despite heavy damage, Straw 2 attempted to divert to Thailand. The aircraft crossed into Laos, became uncontrollable, and all crewmembers except the radar navigator were rescued. This loss came on top of a stateside loss earlier in the year on 31 March 1972, when B-52D s/n 56-0625 sustained multiple engine failures and an engine pod fire shortly after takeoff from McCoy on a routine training mission. The aircraft immediately attempted to return to the base, but crashed just short of Runway 18R in a civilian residential area of Orlando, Florida immediately north of the airfield, destroying or damaging eight homes. The crew of 7 airmen and 1 civilian on the ground were killed.

The 306 BW returned to McCoy] from its final Southeast Asia deployment in early 1973 after the Paris Peace Accords ended American involvement in the conflict. From 1971 through 1973, other training activities at McCoy included KC-135Q instruction by the 306th Air Refueling Squadron and KC-135A instruction by the 32nd Air Refueling Squadron. Whereas KC-135A aircraft typically carried JP-4 jet fuel, KC-135Q aircraft were specifically modified and equipped to offload JP-7 fuel and supported worldwide in-flight refueling requirements for USAF Lockheed U-2 and SR-71 reconnaissance aircraft. By the fall of 1973 all wing tactical squadrons were reassigned or became non-operational in preparation for the shutdown of Air Force activity at McCoy.

The 306th was inactivated in July 1974 as part of a post-Vietnam reduction in force and the related base closure process for McCoy. Its B-52D and KC-135A aircraft assets were redistributed to other SAC wings. In 1984, a former 7th Bombardment Wing B-52D, on loan from the National Museum of the United States Air Force, was flown from Carswell Air Force Base, Texas to McCoy, now Orlando International Airport, for permanent static display at the airport's McCoy AFB/B-52 Memorial Park.

=== 306th Strategic Wing ===
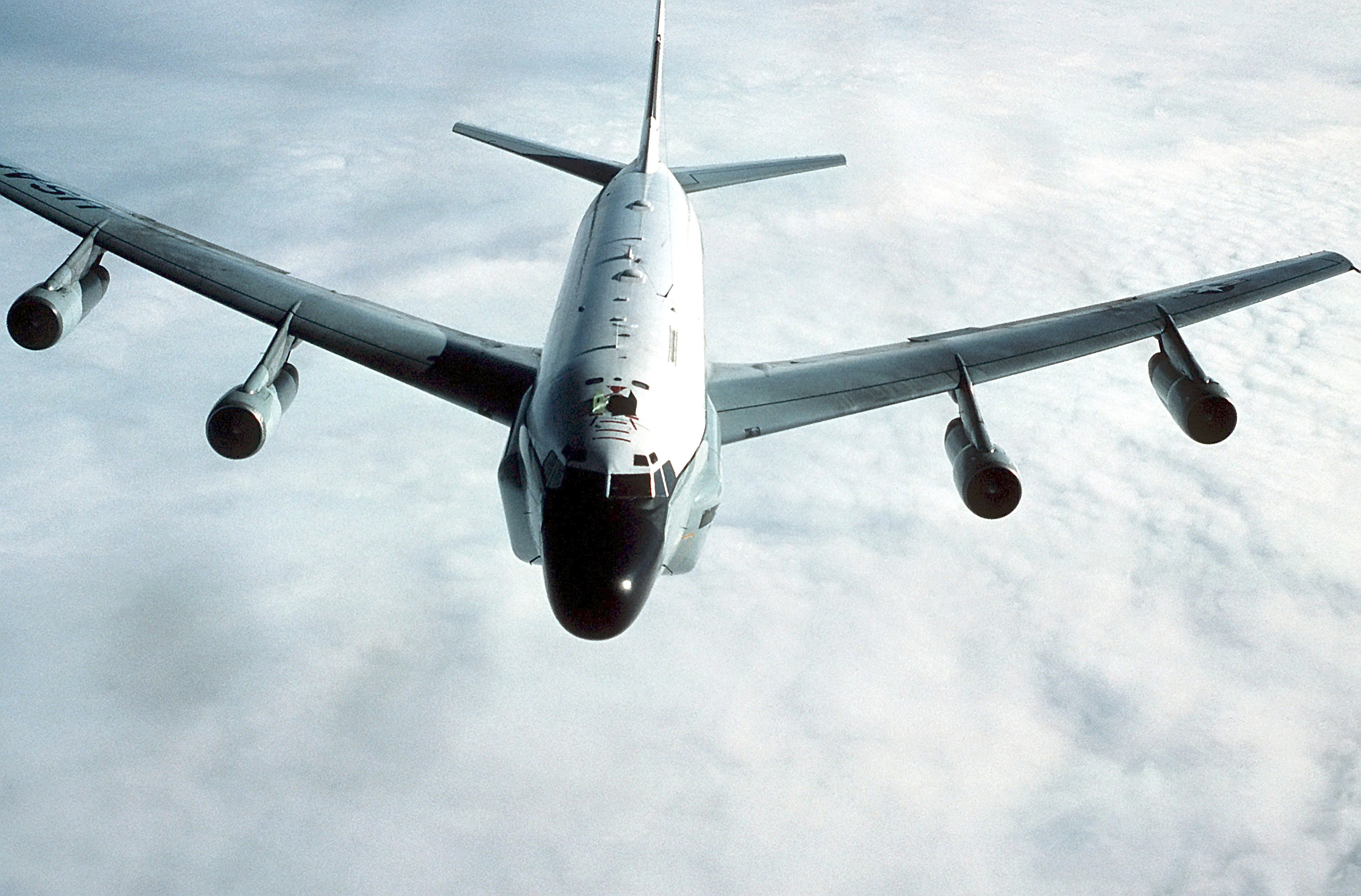
306th Strategic Wing RC-135 refueling over the North Sea

On 15 August 1976, the 306th was activated once again as the 306th Strategic Wing at Ramstein Air Base, West Germany. but did not become operational until October. When the 98th Strategic Wing at Torrejon Air Base, Spain inactivated at the end of the year the 306th assumed as the focal point for all operations in Europe and acted as the SAC liaison with United States Air Forces Europe (USAFE) and European Command.

On 1 July 1978, the 306th moved to RAF Mildenhall, United Kingdom and became subordinate to 7th Air Division, which was activated at Ramstein to assume the SAC liaison mission. The wing was assigned the 922d Strategic Squadron at Hellenikon Air Base, Greece and a month later, the 34th Strategic Squadron at Zaragoza Air Base, Spain. For most of this period the wing operated KC-135s and RC-135s from Mildenhall, Zaragoza, and Hellenikon. In 1985, McDonnell Douglas KC-10A Extender aircraft were assigned to Zaragoza.

The 306th supported air refueling requirements for a variety of aircraft in or transiting the European Theater including USAF EC-135s, RC-135s, USAF & NATO E-3As, USAF General Dynamics F-111 Aardvarks, McDonnell F-4 Phantom IIs, Lockheed C-141 Starlifters, Lockheed C-5 Galaxys, [McDonnell Douglas KC-10 Extenders, Lockheed MC-130s, B-52s, Rockwell B-1 Lancers, SR-71s, and Royal Air Force Lightning F.6 aircraft. The 306th operated at Mildenhall until 31 March 1992 when it was inactivated in anticipation of SAC's disestablishment and the transfer of SAC's European assets. The wing's tanker mission transferred to USAFE's 100th Air Refueling Wing, while its air reconnaissance mission and 922d squadron transferred to Air Combat Command's 55th Wing.

== Lineage ==
- Constituted as the 306th Bombardment Wing, Medium on 11 August 1948

Activated on 1 September 1950
Redesignated 306th Bombardment Wing, Heavy on 1 April 1963
Inactivated on 1 July 1974

- Redesignated 306th Strategic Wing on 14 August 1976

Activated on 15 August 1976
Inactivated on 31 March 1992

=== Assignments ===
- Second Air Force, 1 September 1950
- 6th Air Division, 10 February 1951

Attached to: 7th Air Division, 11 June – 7 September 1953
Attached to: 5th Air Division, 5 January – 21 February 1955 and 23 October 1956 – 9 January 1957
Attached to: Sidi Slimane Task Force, 9–15 October 1957

- 823d Air Division, 6 February 1961
- 42d Air Division, 30 June 1971 – 1 July 1974
- Strategic Air Command, 15 August 1976
- 7th Air Division, 1 July 1978
- Strategic Air Command, 1 February 1992 – 31 March 1992

=== Components ===
Group

- 306th Bombardment Group: 1 September 1950 – 16 June 1952 (not operational after 11 February 1951)

Squadrons

- 34th Strategic Squadron: 1 August 1978 – 1 October 1986; 1 August 1990 – 31 March 1992

Zaragoza AB, Spain

- 305th Air Refueling Squadron: attached 5 January 1954 – 21 February 1955 and c. 20 December 1956 – c. 9 January 1957; assigned 1 May 1959 – 15 January 1960
- 306th Air Refueling Squadron: attached 10 February 1951 – 15 June 1952, assigned 16 June 1952 – 1 July 1962 (detached 8 November – 22 December 1954, 5 January – 21 February 1955, 20 December 1956 – 9 January 1957, c. 9–15 October 1957, 1 July – 5 October 1958, 5 April – 12 July 1961; not operational, 13 June – 1 July 1962); assigned 1 April 1963 – 30 September 1973 (not operational, 1–30 September 1973)
- 367th Bombardment Squadron: attached 10 February 1951 – 15 June 1952, assigned 16 June 1952 – 1 July 1974 (not operational, 3 January – 1 April 1963 and c. 1 November 1973 – 1 July 1974)
- 368th Bombardment Squadron: attached 10 February 1951 – 15 June 1952, assigned 16 June 1952 – 1 April 1963
- 369th Bombardment Squadron: attached 10 February 1951 – 15 June 1952, assigned 16 June 1952 – 1 April 1963 (not operational, 3 January – 1 April 1963)
- 423d Bombardment Squadron: 1 January 1959 – 1 January 1962 (not operational, 15 October 1961 – 1 January 1962)
- 919th Air Refueling Squadron: 25 March 1967 – 30 June 1971 (not operational, 15–30 June 1971)
- 922d Strategic Squadron: 1 July 1978 – 31 March 1992

Hellenikon AB, Greece.

=== Stations ===
- MacDill Air Force Base, Florida, 1 September 1950
- McCoy Air Force Base, Florida, 1 April 1963 – 1 July 1974
- Ramstein Air Base, West Germany, 15 August 1976
- RAF Mildenhall, Suffolk, England, 1 July 1978 – 1 February 1992

=== Aircraft assigned ===
- Boeing B-29 Superfortress, 1950–1951
- Boeing B-50 Superfortress, 1951
- Boeing B-47 Stratojet, 1951–1963
- Boeing KC-97 Stratofreighter, 1951–1962
- Boeing B-52 Stratofortress, 1963–1973
- Boeing KC-135 Stratotanker, 1963–1973; 1975–1992 (attached)
- Boeing RC-135 (attached), 1976–1992

== See also ==
- List of B-29 Superfortress operators
- List of B-47 units of the United States Air Force
- List of B-50 units of the United States Air Force
- List of B-52 Units of the United States Air Force
- Strategic Air Command
