= List of B-47 units of the United States Air Force =

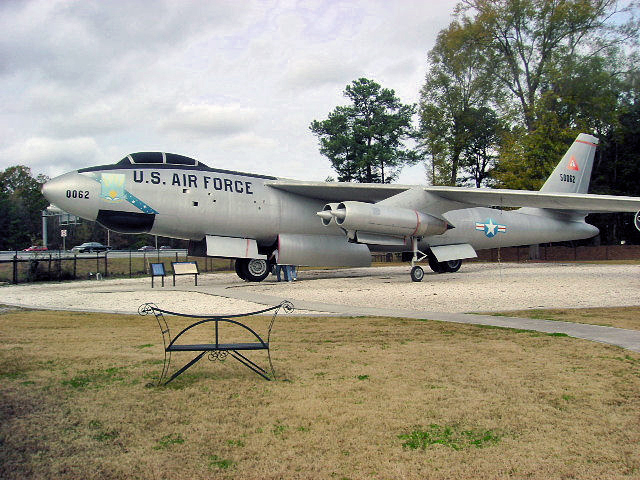
Boeing B-47B-20-BW Stratojet, AF Ser. No. 50-0062, Redesignated NTB-47B in August 1961. Currently on static display at the Mighty Eighth Air Force Museum, Pooler, Georgia

The Boeing B-47 Stratojet was operational with the United States Air Force Strategic Air Command beginning in May 1951 with the first operational B-47Bs to the 306th Bombardment Wing, Medium, based at MacDill AFB, Florida.

In March 1961, President John F. Kennedy directed the phaseout of the B-47. However this was delayed in July by the onset of the Berlin crisis of 1961–62. In the following years, B-47s were gradually delivered to the Military Aircraft Storage and Disposition Center (MASDC) at Davis-Monthan AFB.

Strategic Air Command B-47 Bombardment Wings were divided among the Second, Eighth and Fifteenth Air Forces. This list is of the units B-47s were assigned to, and the bases at which they were stationed .

== B-47 Medium Bombardment units ==
The first operational B-47B Medium bombers were delivered to SAC in July 1951 to the 306th Bombardment Wing, MacDill AFB, Florida. SAC's last two B-47E bombers went to storage on 11 February 1966 from the 98th Bombardment Wing, Lincoln AFB, Nebraska.

Operational medium bomber versions of the Stratojet were B-47B (1951–1953) and B-47E (1953–1957). B-47Bs were modified to B-47E specifications beginning in 1953 to 1957. By 1957, the B-47Bs had effectively ceased to exist, having been brought up to the B-47E standard. These modified B-47Bs are sometimes known as B-47B-II, although this was not an official Air Force designation. Outwardly, they could be distinguished from B-47Es only by their serial numbers.

- 2d Bombardment Wing, Hunter AFB, Georgia

Second Air Force, 25 Nov 1953 – 1 Apr 1963, B-47E

20th Bombardment Squadron
49th Bombardment Squadron
96th Bombardment Squadron
429th Bombardment Squadron (1958–1962)*

Wing transferred to Barksdale AFB, Louisiana in 1963; 20th BS converted to B-52F Stratofortress

- 9th Bombardment Wing, Mountain Home AFB, Idaho

Fifteenth Air Force, 1 Nov 1952 – 15 Mar 1963, B-47B/E; EB-47E**

1st Bombardment Squadron
5th Bombardment Squadron
99th Bombardment Squadron
658th Bombardment Squadron (1958–1962)*

Wing transferred to Beale AFB, California in 1966; 1st and 99th BS converted to Lockheed SR-71 Blackbird

- 19th Bombardment Wing

Pinecastle AFB, Florida, Jun 1954 – Jul 1956
Homestead AFB, Florida, Jul 1956 – Jan 1961
Second Air Force, 11 Jun 1954 – 1 Jan 1961, B-47E

28th Bombardment Squadron
30th Bombardment Squadron (to 4133d SW, B-52H in 1961)
93d Bombardment Squadron (to 4239th SW, B-52H in 1961)
659th Bombardment Squadron (1958–1961)*

Converted to B-52F Stratofortress in 1962

- 22d Bombardment Wing, March AFB, California

Fifteenth Air Force, 1 Nov 1952 – 15 Mar 1963, B-47B/E

2d Bombardment Squadron
19th Bombardment Squadron
33d Bombardment Squadron
408th Bombardment Squadron (1959–1962)*

Converted to B-52B Stratofortress in 1963

- 40th Bombardment Wing

Smoky Hill (later Schilling) AFB, Kansas, 28 May 1952 – 20 Jun 1960
Forbes AFB, Kansas, 20 Jun 1960 – 1 Sep 1965
Fifteenth Air Force (1952–1960), Second Air Force, 1960–1964, B-47E

25th Bombardment Squadron
44th Bombardment Squadron
45th Bombardment Squadron
660th Bombardment Squadron (1959–1960)

Inactivated 1 September 1964

- 43d Bombardment Wing, Davis-Monthan AFB, Arizona

Fifteenth Air Force, 25 Sep 1953 – 15 Mar 1960, B-47E

63d Bombardment Squadron
64th Bombardment Squadron
65th Bombardment Squadron
403d Bombardment Squadron (1958–1960)*

Converted to B-58 Hustler at Carswell AFB, Texas in 1960

- 44th Bombardment Wing

Lake Charles (later Chennault) AFB, Louisiana
Second Air Force, 25 Apr 1953 – 15 Jun 1960, B-47B/E

66th Bombardment Squadron
67th Bombardment Squadron
68th Bombardment Squadron
506th Bombardment Squadron (1958–1960)*

Inactivated 15 June 1960; became 44th Strategic Missile Wing at Ellsworth

- 68th Bombardment Wing

Lake Charles (later Chennault) AFB, Louisiana
Second Air Force, 25 Oct 1953 – 15 Apr 1963, B-47E

51st Bombardment Squadron
52d Bombardment Squadron
656th Bombardment Squadron
657th Bombardment Squadron (1958–1963)*

Wing transferred to Seymour Johnson AFB, North Carolina in 1963; 51st BS converted to B-52G Stratofortress

- 93d Bombardment Wing, Castle AFB, California

Fifteenth Air Force, 15 Apr 1954 – 1 Feb 1955, B-47E

328th Bombardment Squadron
329th Bombardment Squadron
330th Bombardment Squadron

Functioned as a SAC Training Wing – Not Operational; Wing converted to B-52B Stratofortress in 1956

- 96th Bombardment Wing

Second Air Force, Altus AFB, Oklahoma, 18 Nov 1953 – 3 Sep 1957, B-47E
Fifteenth Air Force, Dyess AFB, Texas, 4 Sep 1957 – 18 Mar 1963, B-47E

337th Bombardment Squadron
338th Bombardment Squadron
339th Bombardment Squadron
413th Bombardment Squadron (1958–1961)*

Converted to B-52E Stratofortress in 1962

- 97th Bombardment Wing, Biggs AFB, Texas

Fifteenth Air Force, 1 Apr 1955 – 1 Oct 1959, B-47E

340th Bombardment Squadron
341st Bombardment Squadron (to 4038th SW, B-52G in 1960)
342d Bombardment Squadron (to 4137th SW, B-52G in 1960)

Wing transferred to Blytheville AFB, Arkansas in 1959; 340th BS converted to B-52G Stratofortress

- 98th Bombardment (later Strategic Aerospace) Wing

Lincoln AFB, Nebraska, B-47E
Fifteenth Air Force, 15 Oct 1954 – 31 Dec 1958 (98th BMW)
Second Air Force, 1 Jan 1959 – 25 Jun 1966 (98th SAW after 1 Feb 1964)

343d Bombardment Squadron
344th Bombardment Squadron
345th Bombardment Squadron
415th Bombardment Squadron (1958–1962)*

Inactivated 25 June 1966

- 100th Bombardment Wing

Portsmouth (later, Pease) AFB, New Hampshire
Eighth Air Force, 1 Jan 1956 – 25 Jun 1966, B-47E

349th Bombardment Squadron
350th Bombardment Squadron
351st Bombardment Squadron
418th Bombardment Squadron (1959–1962)*

Wing transferred to Davis-Monthan AFB, Arizona in 1966; converted to Lockheed U-2

- 301st Bombardment Wing, Lockbourne AFB, Ohio

Second Air Force, 20 Jun 1953 – 15 Apr 1958
Eighth Air Force, 16 Apr 1958 – 15 Jun 1964
B-47B/E, 1953–1958, 1958–1961; RB-47, 1958; EB-47E**, 1961–1964

32d Bombardment Squadron
352d Bombardment Squadron
353d Bombardment Squadron
419th Bombardment Squadron (1958–1961)*

Became KC-135 Air Refueling Wing in 1964

- 303d Bombardment Wing, Davis-Monthan AFB, Arizona

Fifteenth Air Force, 20 Jan 1953 – 15 Jun 1964, B-47B/E

358th Bombardment Squadron
359th Bombardment Squadron
360th Bombardment Squadron
427th Bombardment Squadron (1958–1961)*

Inactivated 15 June 1964

- 305th Bombardment Wing

Fifteenth Air Force, MacDill AFB, Florida, 15 Apr 1952 – 15 Feb 1961, B-47B/E
Second Air Force, Bunker Hill AFB, Indiana, 16 Feb 1961 – 1 Apr 1963, B-47E

364th Bombardment Squadron
365th Bombardment Squadron
366th Bombardment Squadron
422d Bombardment Squadron (1960–1961)

Converted to B-58 Hustler in 1961

- 306th Bombardment (later Strategic Aerospace) Wing, MacDill AFB, Florida

Second Air Force, 306th BMW, 2 Apr 1951 – 1 Jan 1959, B-47A/B/E***
Second Air Force, 306th SAW, 1 Jan 1959 – 1 Apr 1963, B-47E

367th Bombardment Squadron
368th Bombardment Squadron
369th Bombardment Squadron
423d Bombardment Squadron (1959–1962)*

Wing transferred to McCoy AFB, Florida in 1963; 367th BS converted to B-52D Stratofortress

- 307th Bombardment Wing, Lincoln AFB, Nebraska

Fifteenth Air Force, 8 Nov 1954 – 30 Dec 1958, B-47E
Second Air Force, 31 Dec 1958 – 25 Jun 1965, B-47E; EB-47L (1962-1964)

370th Bombardment Squadron
371st Bombardment Squadron
372d Bombardment Squadron
424th Bombardment Squadron (1958–1961)*

Inactivated 25 March 1965

- 308th Bombardment Wing, Hunter AFB, Georgia

Second Air Force, 25 Sep 1952 – 25 Jun 1961, B-47B/E

373d Bombardment Squadron
374th Bombardment Squadron
375th Bombardment Squadron
425th Bombardment Squadron (1958–1961)*

Became non-operational 15 Jul 1959; Wing transferred to Little Rock AFB, Arkansas and converted to LGM-25C Titan II ICBMs (373d 374th SMS) in 1963.

- 310th Bombardment Wing, Smoky Hill (later Schilling) AFB, Kansas

Second Air Force, 10 May 1954 – 30 Dec 1958, B-47E
Fifteenth Air Force, 31 Dec 1958 – 25 Feb 1965, B-47E

379th Bombardment Squadron
380th Bombardment Squadron
381st Bombardment Squadron
428th Bombardment Squadron (1959–1962)*

Inactivated 25 June 1965

- 320th Bombardment Wing, March AFB, California

Fifteenth Air Force, 23 Jul 1953 – 15 Sep 1960
YRB-47B, 1953+; B-47E, 1953–1960

441st Bombardment Squadron
442d Bombardment Squadron
443d Bombardment Squadron
444th Bombardment Squadron (1959–1960)*

Converted to B-52F Stratofortress (441st BS) in 1963

- 321st Bombardment Wing, Pinecastle (later McCoy) AFB, Florida

Second Air Force, 15 Dec 1953 – 1 Jan 1959, B-47B/E
Eighth Air Force, 1 Jan 1959 – 25 Oct 1961, B-47E

445th Bombardment Squadron
446th Bombardment Squadron
447th Bombardment Squadron
448th Bombardment Squadron

Inactivated 25 October 1961

- 340th Bombardment Wing, Sedalia (later Whiteman) AFB, Missouri

Fifteenth Air Force, 8 Aug 1953 – 30 Dec 1958
Second Air Force, 31 Dec 1958 – 1 Sep 1963
YRB-47B, 1954-1955+; B-47E, 1955–1963

486th Bombardment Squadron
487th Bombardment Squadron
488th Bombardment Squadron
489th Bombardment Squadron (1958–1962)*

Inactivated 1 September 1963

- 341st Bombardment Wing, Abiline (Later Dyess AFB), Texas

Fifteenth Air Force, 1 Sep 1955 – 25 Jun 1961, B-47E

10th Bombardment Squadron
12th Bombardment Squadron
490th Bombardment Squadron
491st Bombardment Squadron (1958–1961)*

Inactivated 25 Jun 1961

- 376th Bombardment Wing,

Second Air Force, Barksdale AFB, Louisiana, 23 Feb 1954 – 14 Nov 1957, B-47E
Eighth Air Force, Lockbourne AFB, Ohio, 15 Nov 1957 – 15 Mar 1955, B-47E, 1957–1961; EB-47L++, 1961–1965

512th Bombardment Squadron
513th Bombardment Squadron
514th Bombardment Squadron
515th Bombardment Squadron (1958–1961)*

Inactivated 15 March 1965

- 379th Bombardment Wing, Homestead AFB, Florida

Second Air Force, 1 Nov 1955 – 1 Jan 1959, B-47E

524th Bombardment Squadron
525th Bombardment Squadron (to 4136th SW, B-52H in 1961)
526th Bombardment Squadron (to 4042d SW, B-52H in 1961)
527th Bombardment Squadron (1958–1959)*

Transferred to Wurtsmith AFB, Michigan; converted to B-52H Stratofortress (524 BS) in 1961

- 380th Bombardment Wing, Plattsburgh AFB, New York

Second Air Force, 1 Jul 1955 – 25 Jun 1965
B-47E, 1955–; EB-47E** 1962–1964

528th Bombardment Squadron
529th Bombardment Squadron
530th Bombardment Squadron
531st Bombardment Squadron (1959–1961)*

Converted to B-52G Stratofortress (528th BS) in 1966

- 384th Bombardment Wing, Little Rock AFB, Arkansas

Second Air Force, 1 Aug 1955 – 2 Apr 1966, B-47E

544th Bombardment Squadron
545th Bombardment Squadron
546th Bombardment Squadron
547th Bombardment Squadron (1958–1961)*

Inactivated 1 September 1964

- 509th Bombardment Wing

Fifteenth Air Force, Walker AFB, New Mexico, 1 Jul 1955 – 30 Jun 1958, B-47E
Eighth Air Force, Pease AFB, New Hampshire, 1 Jul 1958 – 2 Apr 1966, B-47E

393d Bombardment Squadron
715th Bombardment Squadron
830th Bombardment Squadron
661st Bombardment Squadron (1959–1962)*

Converted to B-52D Stratofortress (393d BS) in 1966

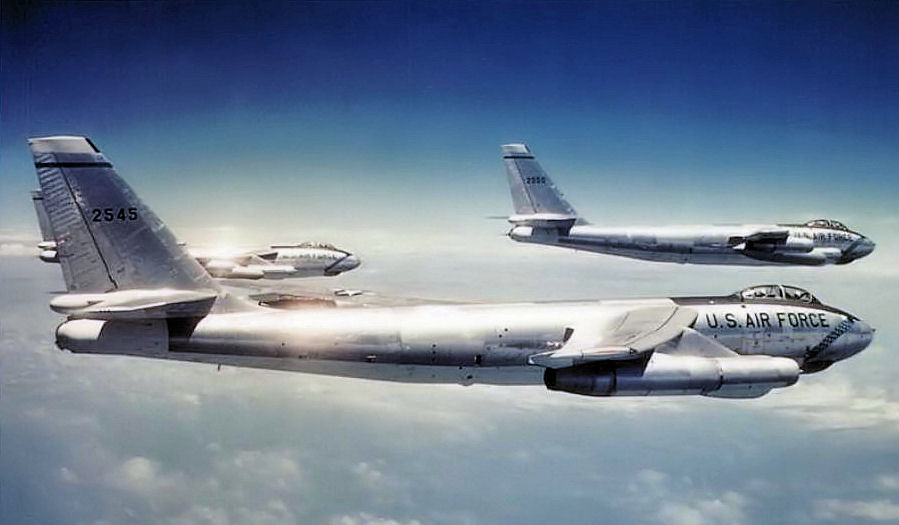
3 Aircraft formation of B-47Es of the 306th Bombardment Wing. Boeing B-47E-95-BW Stratojet 52-545 identifiable. That aircraft was retired to MASDC on 19 November 1965.

.* Activated as a result of the SAC phaseout and consolidated of B-47 units as the Stratojet began being replaced by B-52.

.** Three modified 55th SRW B-47Es (53-2315, 53-2316 and 53-2320) from Forbes AFB were modified and redesignated as EB-47E Tell Twos. Deployed to a SAC Detachment (TUSLOG Det-50) at Incirlik AB, Turkey to monitor the telemetry broadcast during Soviet space launches from the IRBM facility at Kapustin Yar and the space center at Tyuratam. In service from 1958 until about 1967. In addition, the 301st BW and 380th BW also operated EB-47Es which were electronics countermeasure conversions of the standard B-47E. Not much is known about the USAF EB-47E program.

.*** The B-47As of the 306th BW were primarily training aircraft and were not considered as being combat ready. None of the B-47As ever saw any operational duty, and were withdrawn from active service by 1953, being replaced by B-47Bs.

.+ Equipped with the YRB-47B conversion of the B-47B, specifically intended for the training of crews for RB-47Es. Later converted to B-47E Bomber Configuration by March 1955

.++ 376th BW EB-47Ls were modified B-47Es used as an electronics communications aircraft which served as relay stations between other aircraft (such as the USAF "Looking Glass" EC-135) or between aircraft and ground stations during and after a nuclear attack.

== RB-47 Strategic Reconnaissance units ==
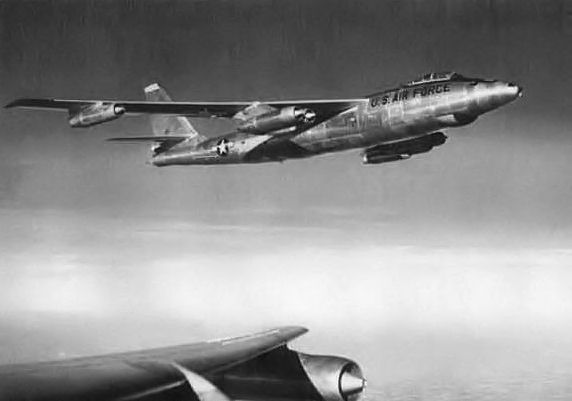
RB-47Ks of the SAC 338th Strategic Reconnaissance Squadron.

The RB-47 was designed to replace the RB-29 and RB-50 Superfortress aircraft which were serving in the long-range photo-reconnaissance role but which were rapidly approaching obsolescence. The RB-47 carried out many ferret missions around the periphery of Soviet territory, and sometimes inside on penetration flights to map planned routes for B-52s if combat missions over the Soviet Union ever became necessary. The reconnaissance production model was the RB-47E, with USAF deliveries beginning in 1953. The last of 255 RB-47Es were delivered in August 1955.

The YRB-47B was a prototype conversion of the B-47B specifically intended for the training of crews for RB-47Es. Delays in delivering the RB-47E, led to 90 B-47's being converted to an interim reconnaissance fit with an 8 camera bomb-bay pod. The 91st Strategic Reconnaissance Wing received its first YRB-47B in April 1953, the 26th Strategic Reconnaissance Wing three months later, using them until they were swapped for the new RB-47E in 1954.

The RB-47H was an electronic reconnaissance and countermeasures version, with 35 aircraft being manufactured and delivered to the 55th Strategic Reconnaissance Wing at Forbes AFB, Kansas in August 1955. A specialized version, the ERB-47H was a dedicated electronic ferret modification of three aircraft.

Fifteen RB-47Ks (53-426 to 53-4279) were also operated by the 55th SRW, 338th SRS. The RB-47K differed from the RB-47E by the addition of high-resolution, side-looking radars (SLAR) and air sampling equipment. It was used as an airborne weather information gathering system which would fly near the Soviet Border and sampling the radioactive fallout from nuclear tests. These were among the last Stratojets built.

Phaseout of the RB-47E began in October 1957, but the aircraft remained in service for another decade, with the last SAC B-47, a RB-47H (53-4296) of the 55th SRW was flown to Davis Monthan AFB for storage on 29 December 1967. These models were replaced with the Lockheed U-2 and SR-71 strategic reconnaissance aircraft.

- 26th Strategic Reconnaissance Wing

Lockbourne AFB, Ohio
2d Air Force, 9 May 1952 – 30 Jun 1955
8th Air Force, 1 Jul 1955 – 1 Jul 1958
YRB-47 (1953–1954); RB-47B* (1953–1954); RB-47E (1954–1958), B-47E (1958)

3d Strategic Reconnaissance Squadron
4th Strategic Reconnaissance Squadron
10th Strategic Reconnaissance Squadron

Wing inactivated 1 July 1958

- 55th Strategic Reconnaissance Wing

15th Air Force, Ramey AFB, Puerto Rico (1950–1954)
Wing converted to Boeing RB-47's in 1954 upon Txfer from Ramey
15th Air Force, Forbes AFB, Kansas, (1954–1967)
ERB-47H, RB-47H (1954–1967), RB-47K (1955–1962)

38th Strategic Reconnaissance Squadron
338th Strategic Reconnaissance Squadron
343d Strategic Reconnaissance Squadron

Wing converted to Boeing RC-135s in 1968

- 70th Strategic Reconnaissance Wing, Little Rock AFB, Arkansas

2d Air Force, 24 Jan 1955 – 25 Jun 1962
RB-47E (1955–1961), B-47E (1961–1962)

6th Strategic Reconnaissance Squadron
26th Strategic Reconnaissance (later 681st Bombardment) Squadron

Converted to B-47E medium bombers in late 1961; inactivated in 1962.

- 90th Strategic Reconnaissance Wing

15th Air Force, Forbes AFB, Kansas (1954–1960)
RB-47E, 1954–1960

319th Strategic Reconnaissance Squadron
320th Strategic Reconnaissance Squadron
321st Strategic Reconnaissance Squadron

Wing inactivated 20 June 1960

- 91st Strategic Reconnaissance Wing

2d Air Force, Lockbourne AFB, Ohio
YRB-47, RB-47E (1953–1957)

322d Strategic Reconnaissance Squadron
323d Strategic Reconnaissance Squadron
324th Strategic Reconnaissance Squadron

Wing inactivated 8 November 1957

.* RB-47Bs were operated during 1953–54 by the 26th SRW. Unlike the later RB-47E, the RB-47B could only provide daylight photographic coverage

== WB-47E Weather Reconnaissance units ==
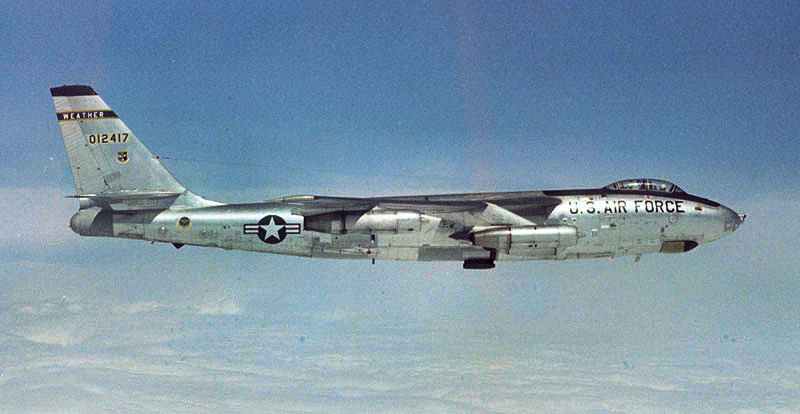
Boeing WB-47E-60-BW Stratojet tail number 51-2417 of the 55th Weather Reconnaissance Squadron flying an operational mission from McClellan AFB, California. Retired on 12 Sep 1969.

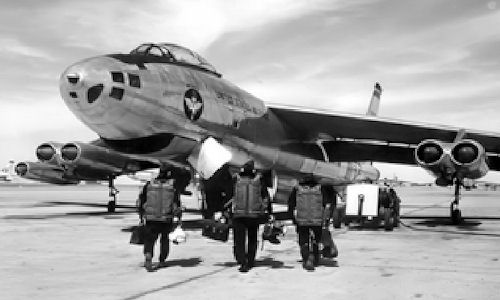
B-47 Pilot training at Wichita AFB, Kansas – Air Training Command, 1951

WB-47E was the designation assigned to converted SAC B-47E medium bombers used for weather reconnaissance by the Air Weather Service (AWS). They had nose-mounted cameras that recorded cloud formations, and they carried air-sampling and data recording equipment inside a sensor pod in the bomb bay.

- 53d Weather Reconnaissance Squadron, Hunter AFB, Georgia (1963–1966); Ramey AFB, Puerto Rico, (1966–1969)
- 55th Weather Reconnaissance Squadron, McClellan AFB, California, 1963–1969
- 57th Weather Reconnaissance Squadron Hickam AFB Hawaii xxxx–1969

The first of 34 WB-47Es was delivered to the AWS on 20 March 1963. The last operational USAF B-47 to fly was WB-47E-75-BW (51-7066) of the 57th Weather Reconnaissance Squadron on 30 October 1969. It was flown from Hickam AFB, Hawaii to Boeing Field, Washington, where subsequently it was restored to its SAC configuration and put on display at the Seattle Museum of Flight where it resides today. The aircraft was flown from Hickam AFB by Lt. Col Bill Payton and Major Ray Hamilton.

== 4-Digit Training Units ==
B-47 training was originally planned to have been performed at Wichita AFB, Kansas, with Boeing manufacturing the aircraft on one side of the base as a joint tenant beginning in 1951. However a variety of problems converting the Wichita Municipal Airport to an Air Force Base kept training from being performed there until 1954. To accommodate B-47 training, Air Training Command activated Pinecastle AFB, Florida, on 10 September 1951 for B-47 training, however the training did not begin until early 1952 with the activation of the 3540th Combat Crew Training Wing.

- 3540th Combat Crew Training Wing (ATC) (10 Jan 1952 – 1 Jan 1954)

TB-47B, B-47B, 1952–1954

3542d Combat Crew (later Flying Training) Training Squadron
3544th Combat Crew (later Flying Training) Training Squadron

Replaced by : 4240th Flying Training Wing (SAC) (1 Jan – 30 May 1954), Pinecastle AFB, Florida

B-47 crew training was moved from Pinecastle AFB to McConnell AFB in 1954; conducted under Air Training Command until 30 Dec 1958 when was reassigned to SAC. With the reassignment of the crew training wing, operational transition training on the B-47 began at Pinecastle with the 321st Bombardment Wing.

- 3520th Combat Crew Training Wing (ATC) (7 Jun 1951 – 1 Jan 1959)

3520th Combat Crew Training Squadron, 26 Oct 1954 – 1 Jul 1958
3521st Combat Crew Training Squadron, 26 Oct 1954 – 8 Sep 1955
3522d (later 4347th) Combat Crew Training Squadron, 26 Oct 1954 – 31 Dec 1958
3523d (later 4348th) Combat Crew Training Squadron, 26 Oct 1954 – 31 Dec 1958
3525th Combat Crew Training Squadron, 26 Oct 1954 – 8 Sep 1955
3526th Combat Crew Training Squadron, 26 Oct 1954 – 31 Dec 1958

Replaced by: 4347th Combat Crew Training Wing (SAC), (1 Jan 1959 – 15 Jun 1963) McConnell AFB, Kansas
TB-47B, B-47B, 1954–1963

4347th Combat Crew Training Squadron, 1 Jan 1959 – 15 Jun 1963
4348th Combat Crew Training Squadron, 1 Jan 1959 – 15 Jun 1963
4349th Combat Crew Training Squadron, 1 Jan 1959 – 15 Jun 1963
4350th Combat Crew Training Squadron, 1 Sep 1959 – 15 Jun 1962

Crew training on the B-47 ended in June 1963 as part of the planned aircraft phaseout and retirement.
