= 368th Training Squadron =

368th Training Squadron

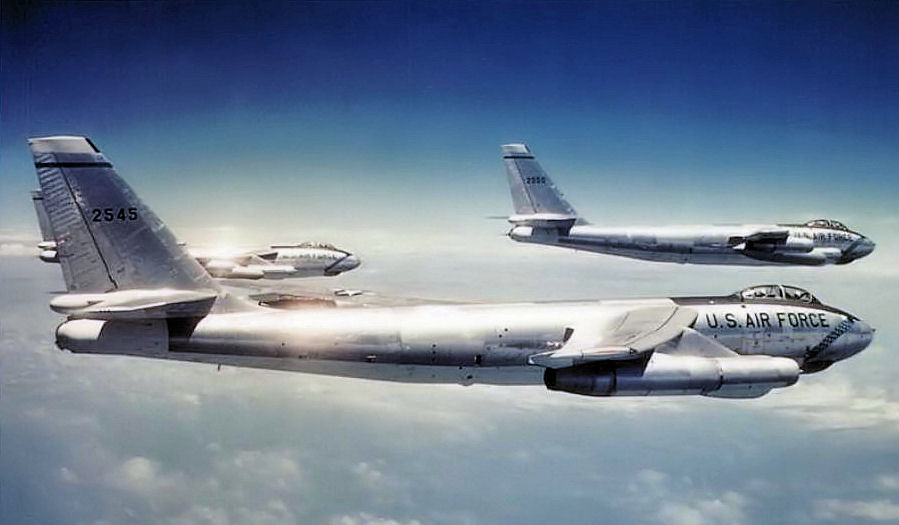
- B-47E Stratojets of the 306th Bombardment Wing (Note: Aircraft in foreground is Boeing B-47E-95-BW Stratojet, serial 52-545. That aircraft was retired to The Military Aircraft Storage and Disposition Center on 19 November 1965.)
- Active: 1942–1946; 1947–1974; 2018–present
- Country: United States
- Branch: United States Air Force
- Role: Training
- Part of: Air Education and Training Command
- Garrison/HQ: Fort Leonard Wood
- Motto: Ready to Fight Tonight (after 2018)
- Engagements: European Theater of Operations
- Decorations: Distinguished Unit Citation; Air Force Outstanding Unit Award

Insignia
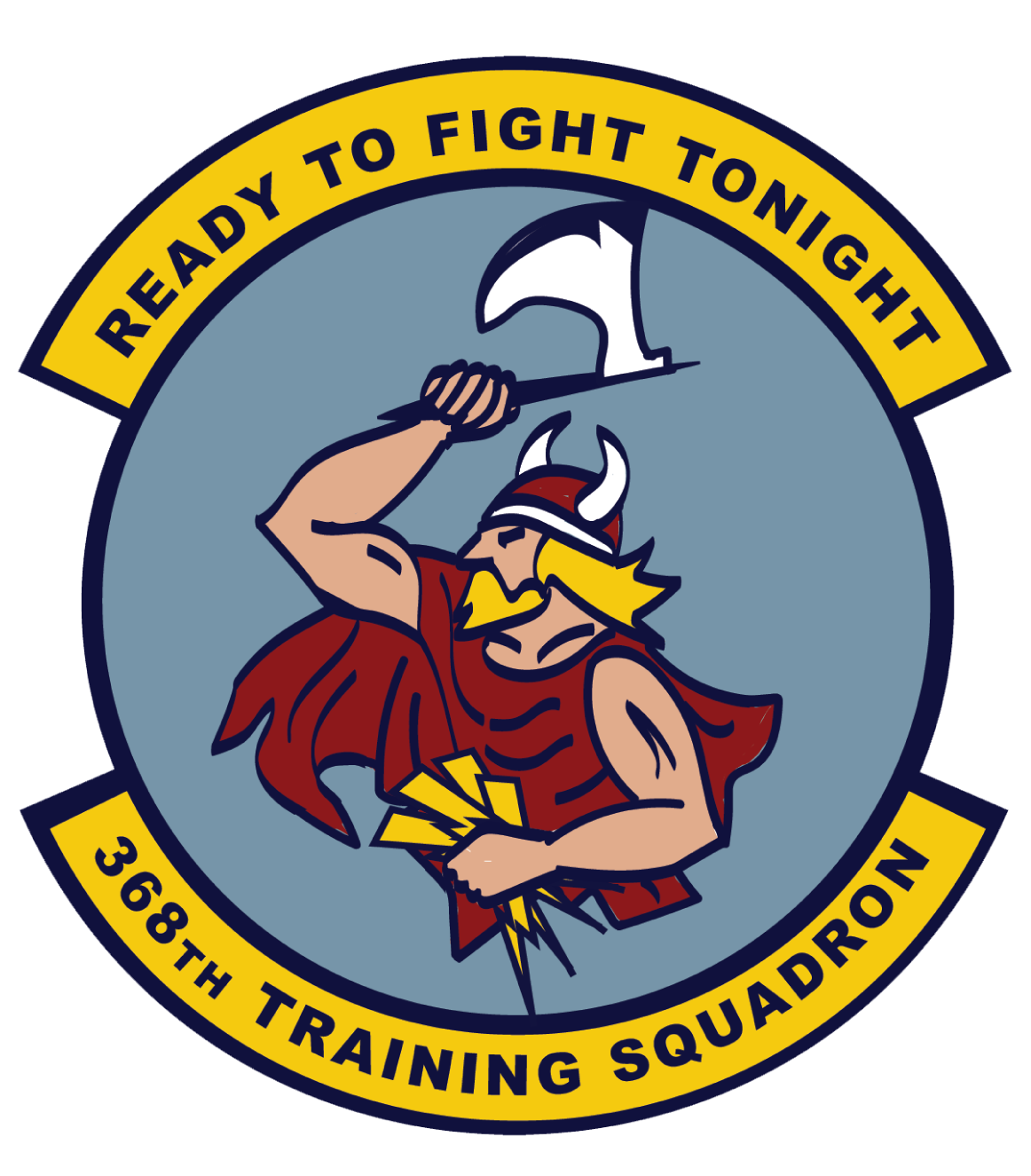
- 368th Training Squadron emblem

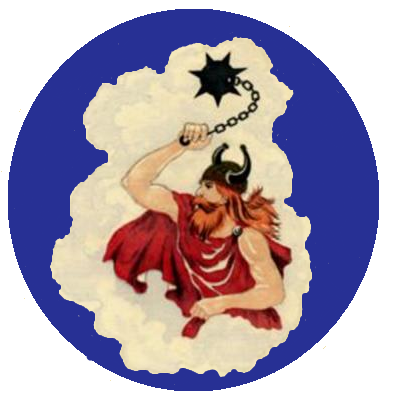
- 368th Bombardment Squadron emblem (Note: Approved 26 August 1942. Description: On a white cloud the representation of the Norse mythological god Thor issuant, habited in a red cloak, a gold cap with black horns, casting with his upraised right arm a black chain mace.)
- World War II squadron fuselage code (Note: The 368th emblem was designed by B-17 gunner Thomas Albert Donlon, Jr., of the bomber Lady Winifred.): BO

The 368th Training Squadron is a United States Air Force ground training unit, located at Fort Leonard Wood, Missouri. The squadron reports to the 782d Training Group, part of the 82d Training Wing, at Sheppard Air Force Base, Texas and conducts training for airmen in civil engineering, (including engineering assistant, pavement and equipment, and emergency management) as well as in logistics readiness in ground transportation.

The squadron was first activated in 1942 as the 368th Bombardment Squadron. After training in the United States, it became one of the first units to deploy to the European Theater of Operations to participate in the strategic bombing campaign against Germany. earning two Distinguished Unit Citations. After V-E Day, the squadron remained in Europe and participated in the photographic mapping of Europe and Africa until it was inactivated in 1946.

The squadron was reactivated in 1947, then moved to MacDill Air Force Base, Florida, where it became one of the first Boeing B-47 Stratojet units in Strategic Air Command. It was inactivated in 1963, as SAC drew down its medium bomber force.

== History ==
=== World War II ===
==== Initial organization and training ====
The squadron was first established in March 1942 at Gowen Field, Idaho as the 368th Bombardment Squadron, one of the original four squadrons of the 306th Bombardment Group. In April, its personnel moved to Wendover Field, Utah, where it began training with Boeing B-17 Flying Fortress heavy bombers. On 1 August 1942, the squadron's ground echelon began its deployment, spending a week at Richmond Army Air Base, Virginia before moving to Fort Dix, New Jersey at the Port of Embarkation. It sailed on the RMS Queen Elizabeth on 30 August, arriving in Scotland on 5 September 1942. The air echelon departed for Westover Field, Massachusetts, and began ferrying their B-17s to England via the North Atlantic ferrying route.

==== Combat in Europe ====
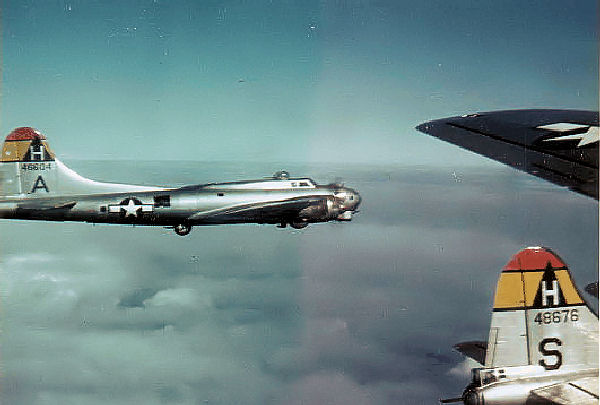
B-17Gs of the 306th Bombardment Group

The squadron settled into its combat station, RAF Thurleigh, England, in early September. Although several bomber units arrived in England before the 368th, when these units left England to participate in Operation Torch it became, along with its companion squadrons of the 306th Group, the oldest bombardment squadrons of VIII Bomber Command. It few its first combat mission on 9 October 1942 against a steel factory near Lille, France, but with poor results. This was the first mission on which VIII Bomber Command assembled a strike force of over 100 bombers. (Note: With the departure of units to North Africa in Operation Torch, it would be six months before VIII Bomber Command could duplicate this feat. Freeman, p. 18.) The squadron operated primarily against strategic targets, including the locomotive factory at Lille, marshalling yards at Rouen, France, and Stuttgart, Germany. The squadron took part in the first strike into Germany by bombers of Eighth Air Force on 27 January 1943 when it struck U-boat yards at Wilhelmshaven. It struck shipbuilding yards at Vegesack, ball bearing plants at Schweinfurt, the aircraft factory at Leipzig, Germany, and similar facilities.

On 11 January 1944, the squadron participated in an attack on an aircraft plant in central Germany, near Brunswick. Extensive cloud cover had resulted in the recall of two of the three bombardment divisions involved in the mission and made the rendezvous of the fighter groups scheduled to provide cover in the target area difficult. In contrast, clear weather to the east of the target permitted the Germans to assemble one of the largest fighter formations since October 1943, with 207 enemy fighters making contact with the strike force. For this mission, the squadron was awarded the Distinguished Unit Citation (DUC). The following month the squadron earned a second DUC for its performance during Big Week, an intensive bombing campaign against the German aircraft industry. Despite adverse weather on 22 February that led supporting elements to abandon the mission the squadron and group effectively bombed the aircraft assembly plant at Bernburg, Germany.

The squadron also performed in a tactical role, assisting ground forces Operation Cobra, the St Lo breakthrough, Operation Market Garden, the attempt to establish a bridgehead across the Rhine near Arnhem in the Netherlands, stopping German attacking forces in the Battle of the Bulge, and bombing enemy positions during Operation Varsity, the airborne assault across the Rhine in the spring of 1945.

After V-E Day, the squadron became part of the occupation forces and participated in Project Casey Jones, the photographic mapping of portions of Europe and North Africa. The 306th Group began to phase out of the project in July. In February 1946, the squadron moved to Istres-Le Tubé Air Base, France, where it absorbed elements of the inactivating 92d and 384th Bombardment Groups, returning to Germany in July. The squadron was inactivated in December 1946.

=== Strategic Air Command ===
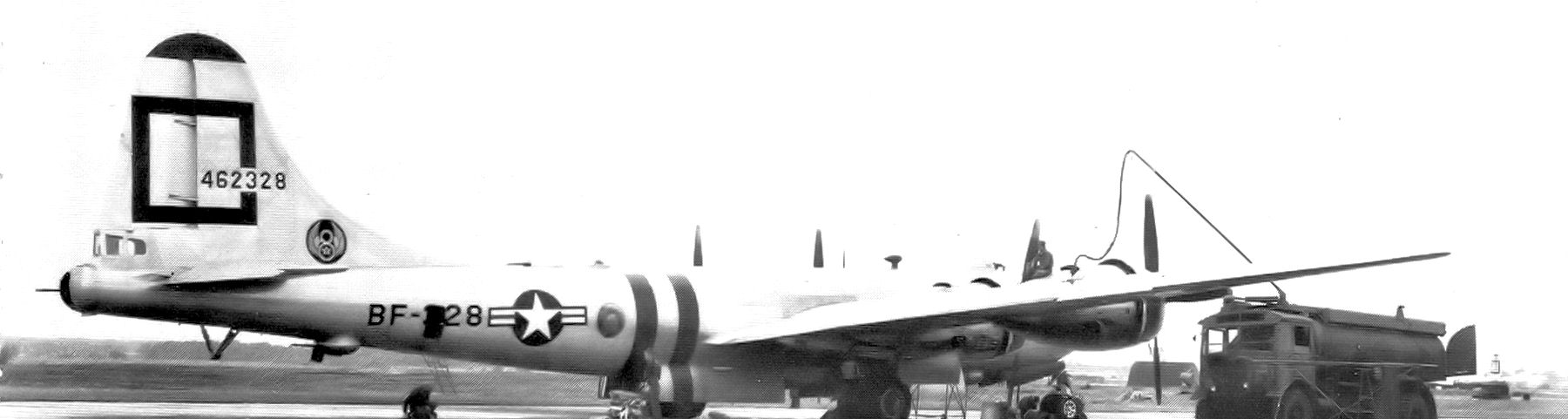
B-29A Superfortress from MacDill AFB

The squadron was reactivated as a Strategic Air Command (SAC) unit at Andrews Field in July 1947. In August 1948, it moved to MacDill Air Force Base, Florida, and began to equip with Boeing B-29 Superfortresses. As SAC bombers began to participate in the Korean War, in September 1950, the squadron began providing transition training for SAC aircrews on the B-29. This training mission continued until February 1951. The squadron also operated the Boeing B-50 Superfortress, an advanced version of the B-29, during this period.

The 306th Bombardment Wing was the first Boeing B-47 Stratojet wing in SAC. The squadron began receiving B-47A Stratojets in May 1951. The squadron would not only train itself on the new bomber, but until December, when Air Training Command assumed the mission, the 306th Wing trained all B-47 aircrew. The B-47As lacked armament and only some even had fully operational bombardment and navigation systems installed. They were not considered operational aircraft and were relegated to training. In October 1952, the squadron began to receive B-47Bs. With the improved version of the Stratojet, the squadron was involved for the next year in developing tactics and procedures for the new jet bomber.

The squadron deployed with the 306th Wing to RAF Fairford from September to December 1953 and to Ben Guerir Air Base, Morocco from January to February 1955 and from October 1956 to January 1957.

From 1958, SAC's B-47 squadrons began to assume an alert posture at their home bases, reducing the amount of time spent on alert at overseas bases. General Thomas S. Power set an initial goal of maintaining one third of SAC’s planes on fifteen minute ground alert, fully fueled and ready for combat to reduce vulnerability to a Soviet missile strike. During the 1958 Lebanon Crisis, the United States deployed tactical forces in Operation Blue Bat. Meanwhile, in a show of force, SAC brought additional bombers to an increased alert status for five days in July. The squadron's alert commitment was increased to half the squadron's aircraft in 1962.

In October 1962, soon after the detection of Soviet missiles in Cuba, SAC began to disperse its B-47 force. However, MacDill was soon to become saturated with tactical forces, and SAC withdrew all forces there. The squadron's B-47s moved to Hunter Air Force Base, Georgia on 21 October, except for bombers on alert, which left the next day in Operation Riders Up. Bombers carried nuclear weapons in ferrying configuration. On 24 October SAC went to DEFCON 2, placing all squadron aircraft on alert. On 27 November SAC returned to normal alert posture and began coordinating the return of squadron planes to MacDill. The squadron began to phase down in preparation for inactivation and was the only squadron in the wing to remain operational after 3 January 1963. The unit inactivated on 1 April 1963.

=== Training unit ===
The Air Force had begun training certain civil engineering skills at Fort Leonard Wood, Missouri in the 1970s. After 1992, additional Air Force training in emergency management and ground transportation was moved to Fort Leonard Wood as well, with Detachment 1, 364th Training Squadron acting as the manager for this training. Eventually, the detachment became the largest in the Air Force, and in early 2018 Air Education and Training Command decided to expand the detachment and replace it with a full squadron. The squadron was redesignated the 368th Training Squadron and absorbed the personnel and equipment of the detachment in a ceremony on 17 October 2018.

== Lineage ==
- Constituted as the 368th Bombardment Squadron (Heavy) on 28 January 1942

Activated on 1 March 1942
Redesignated 368th Bombardment Squadron, Heavy on 20 August 1943
Inactivated on 25 December 1946
Redesignated 368th Bombardment Squadron, Very Heavy on 11 June 1947
Activated on 1 July 1947
Redesignated 368th Bombardment Squadron, Medium on 11 August 1948
Inactivated on 1 April 1963
Redesignated 368th Training Squadron
Activated c. 17 October 2018

=== Assignments ===
- 306th Bombardment Group, 1 March 1942 – 25 December 1946
- 306th Bombardment Group, 1 July 1947 (attached to 306th Bombardment Wing after 10 February 1951)
- 306th Bombardment Wing, 16 June 1952 – 1 April 1963
- 782d Training Group, c. 17 October 2018 – present

=== Stations ===
- Gowen Field, Idaho, 1 March 1942
- Wendover Field, Utah, c. 6 April – 1 August 1942
- RAF Thurleigh (Sta 111), England, c. 6 September 1942 (detachments operated from Gibraltar, 18 August 1945 – January 1946; Port Lyautey Airfield, French Morocco, February – 15 July 1946)
- AAF Station Giebelstadt (Y-90), Germany, 25 December 1945
- Istres-Le Tubé Air Base (Y-17), France, 24 February 1946 (detachment operated from: Dakar Airport, French West Africa, January–March 1946)
- AAF Station Fürstenfeldbruck (R-72), Germany, 16 August 1946
- AAF Station Lechfeld, Germany (R-71), 13 September-25 December 1946
- Andrews Field, Maryland, 1 July 1947
- MacDill Air Force Base, Florida, 1 August 1948 – 1 April 1963
- Fort Leonard Wood, Missouri, c. 17 October 2018 – present

=== Aircraft ===
- Boeing B-17 Flying Fortress, 1942–1946
- Boeing B-29 Superfortress, 1948–1951
- Boeing B-50 Superfortress, 1950–1951
- Boeing B-47 Stratojet, 1951–1963

=== Awards and campaigns ===
Award streamer	Award	Dates	Notes
	Distinguished Unit Citation	11 January 1944	Germany, 368th Bombardment Squadron
	Distinguished Unit Citation	22 February 1944	Germany, 368th Bombardment Squadron
	Air Force Outstanding Unit Award	22 January 1953–8 December 1956	368th Bombardment Squadron
	Air Force Outstanding Unit Award	1 July 2020–30 June 2021	368th Training Squadron
	Air Force Outstanding Unit Award	1 July 2021–30 June 2022	368th Training Squadron

Campaign Streamer	Campaign	Dates	Notes
	Air Offensive, Europe	c. 6 September 1942–5 June 1944	368th Bombardment Squadron
	Air Combat, EAME Theater	c. 6 September 1942–11 May 1945	368th Bombardment Squadron
	Normandy	6 June 1944–24 July 1944	368th Bombardment Squadron
	Northern France	25 July 1944–14 September 1944	368th Bombardment Squadron
	Rhineland	15 September 1944–21 March 1945	368th Bombardment Squadron
	Ardennes-Alsace	16 December 1944–25 January 1945	368th Bombardment Squadron
	Central Europe	22 March 1944–21 May 1945	368th Bombardment Squadron

== See also ==
- List of B-29 Superfortress operators
- List of B-47 units of the United States Air Force
- List of B-50 units of the United States Air Force
- List of B-52 units of the United States Air Force
