= 306th Flying Training Group =

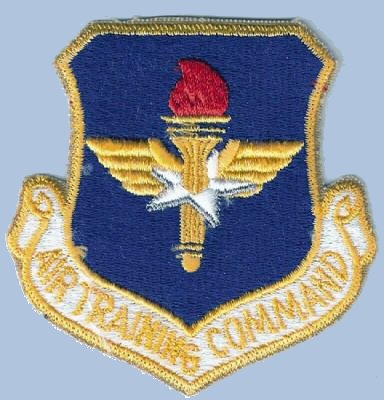
306th Flying Training Group

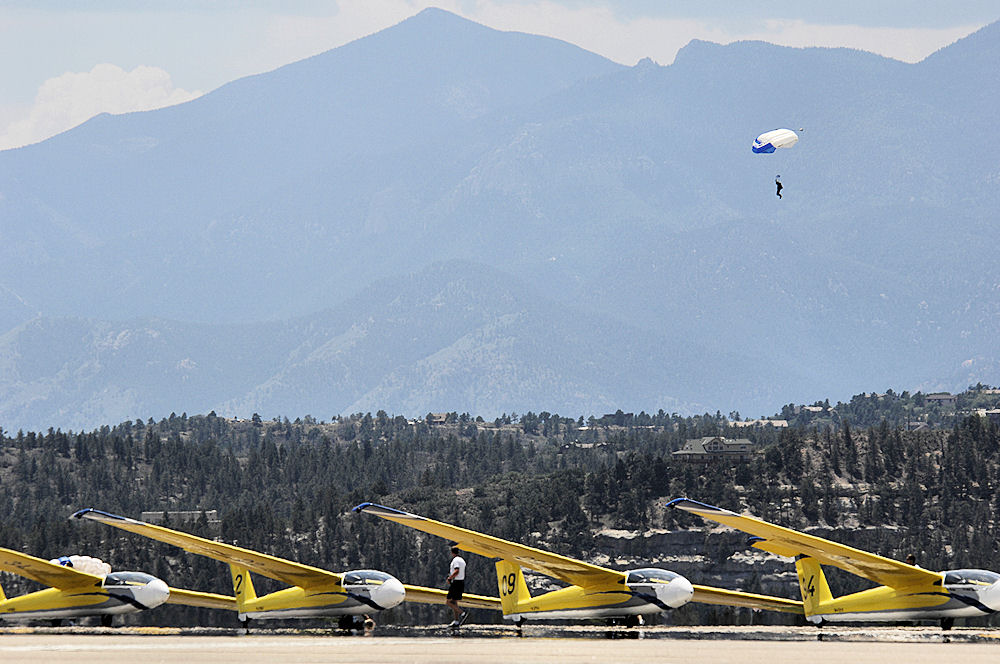
- Cadet parachuting out of airplanes over a lineup of gliders
- Active: 1942–1946; 1947–1952; 2004–present
- Country: United States
- Branch: United States Air Force
- Role: Airmanship training
- Part of: United States Air Force Academy
- Nickname: Reich Wreckers (World War II)
- Motto: Abundance of Strength
- Engagements: European Theater of World War II
- Decorations: Distinguished Unit Citation; Air Force Outstanding Unit Award

Commanders
- Current commander: Colonel Nancy E. Taylor
- Notable commanders: Frank A. Armstrong

Insignia
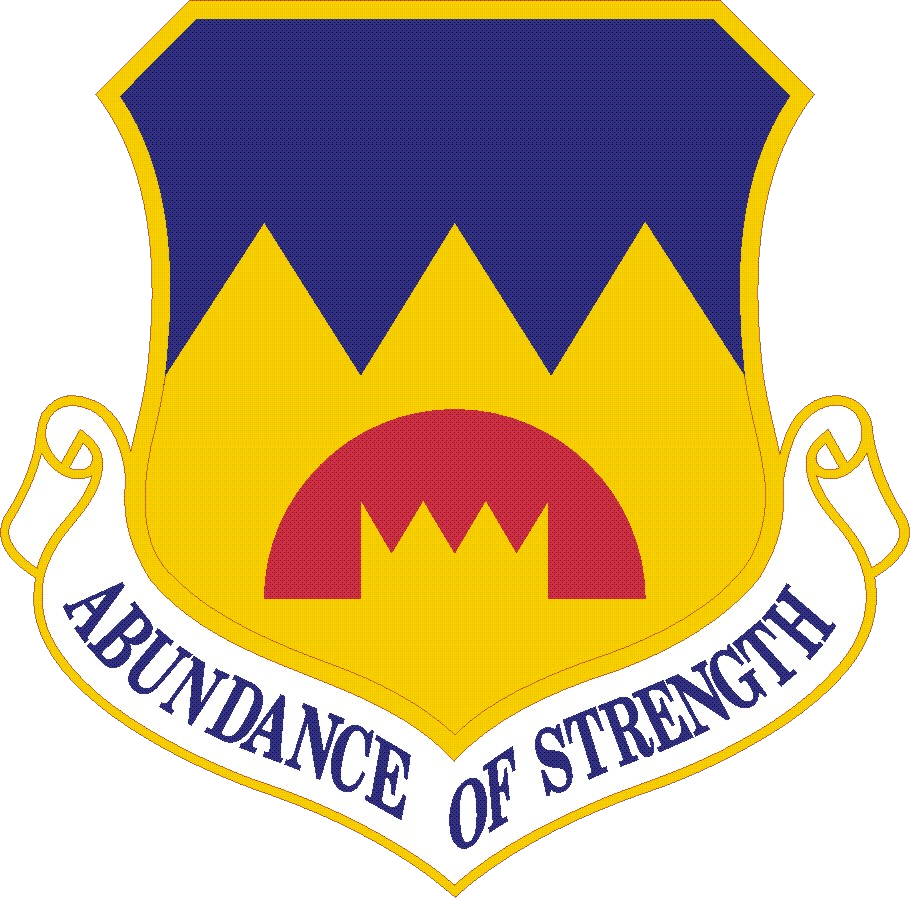
- 306th Flying Training Group Emblem (Note: Approved 21 October 2004.)
- World War II Group Tail Code: Triangle H

The 306th Flying Training Group is a unit of the United States Air Force, assigned to the United States Air Force Academy (USAFA) near Colorado Springs, Colorado.

The 306th Flying Training Group is the airmanship training unit of the USAFA. The group replaced the 34th Operations Group in 2004. The designation "306th" was deliberately selected by the historian of AETC to connect the training mission of the current group with its relationship to the book and movie Twelve O'Clock High.

During World War II, the group, as the 306th Bombardment Group, was the first operational bombardment group in the VIII Bomber Command. It was stationed at RAF Thurleigh, England from 6 September 1942 until 25 December 1945, the longest tenure at one station for any one Eighth Air Force group.

Staff Sergeant Maynard H. Smith of the 423d Bomb Squadron was awarded the Medal of Honor for his actions that helped save the lives of six of his wounded comrades on 1 May 1943.

The 306th was the first Eighth Air Force heavy bombardment group to complete 300 missions over Occupied Europe and Nazi Germany and also was the first United States Army Air Forces heavy bombardment group to attack a strategic target located in Nazi Germany when the group, led by Colonel Frank A. Armstrong, attacked Wilhelmshaven on 27 January 1943. Colonel Armstrong's experiences with the 97th and 306th groups became the basis of Sy Bartlett and Beirne Lay Jr.'s novel and film Twelve O'Clock High.

The group was reactivated as a Strategic Air Command (SAC) group during the Cold War at MacDill AFB, Florida in 1947. The group was initially equipped with Boeing B-29 Superfortresses, and was upgrading to Boeing B-47 Stratojets when it was inactivated in 1952 when SAC transferred its operational squadrons to its parent 306th Bombardment Wing. Although the group remained inactive until 2004, from 1954 to 1992 its history and honors were temporarily bestowed on the 306th Bombardment Wing (Medium) at MacDill AFB, Florida; the 306th Bombardment Wing (Heavy) at McCoy AFB, Florida; and the 306th Strategic Wing at RAF Mildenhall, United Kingdom.

== Units ==
The group consists of the following squadrons:

- 1st Flying Training Squadron

Conducts flight training for all USAF Pilot, Remotely Piloted Aircraft (RPA) Pilot, and Combat Systems Officer (CSO) trainees

- 94th Flying Training Squadron

Conducts glider training

- 98th Flying Training Squadron "Wings of Blue"

Conducts freefall parachute training

- 306th Operations Support Squadron

Airfield and Airspace Management of the USAF Academy Airfield and Bullseye Auxiliary Airfield

- 557th Flying Training Squadron

Conducts flying training (powered)

== History ==
For additional post-WW II history and lineage, see 306th Strategic Wing

=== World War II ===
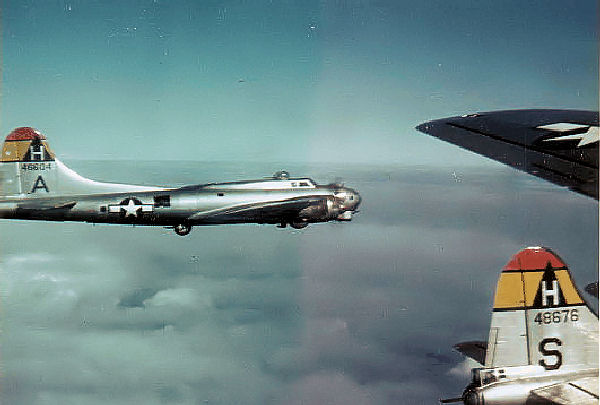
B-17G Flying Fortresses 44-6604 and 44-8676 of the 306th Bomb Group, showing the group's "Triangle H" tail marking

The group was activated 1 March 1942 at Salt Lake City Army Air Base, Utah. Personnel moved to Wendover Army Air Field, Utah on 6 April 1942 and began flying training, where it trained for bombardment operations using 40 B-17E aircraft. Group left Wendover 1 August 1942 to begin movement to the United Kingdom. The Ground unit first moved to Richmond AAB, Virginia and remained a week before leaving for Fort Dix, New Jersey. On 13 August 1942, the Group's personnel sailed on the RMS Queen Elizabeth on 30 August 1942 and arrived 5 September 1942 at Greenock, Scotland. The aircraft flew from Wendover to Westover Field, Massachusetts on 2 August 1942. The remainder of the Group departed for the United Kingdom on 1 September 1942 via Gander-Prestwick ferry route.

Based at RAF Thurleigh, Bedfordshire, in south-central England, as part of the Eighth Air Force, the 306th was the longest continuously-serving bomb group of the Eighth Air Force during World War II, and led the first mission against a target in Germany. The novel and film Twelve O'Clock High were based in large part on incidents occurring in the group in 1942 and 1943.

Between October 1942 and April 1945, the Group bombed a variety of enemy targets in Europe, including railroad facilities and submarine pens in France and ball-bearing works, oil plants, marshaling yards, chemical plants, aircraft factories, and foundries in Germany. Took part in the first penetration into Germany by heavy bombers of the Eighth Air Force on 27 January 1943 by attacking the U-boat yards at Wilhelmshaven.

Sergeant Maynard Harrison Smith received the Medal of Honor for his actions on 1 May 1943. When the aircraft on which he was a gunner was hit by the enemy and set on fire, the sergeant threw explosive ammunition overboard, manned a gun until the German fighters were driven off, administered first aid to the wounded tail gunner, and extinguished the fire.

The 306th was the center of media attention on 6 July 1944, when Thurleigh was visited by the British Royal Family. As cameras rolled, King George VI, his wife Queen Elizabeth, and their daughter Heiress Presumptive Princess Elizabeth (the future Queen Elizabeth II) were led to a new B-17G of the 367th Bomb Squadron. The new replacement aircraft had been named Rose of York in honor of the 18-year-old Princess, who ceremonially christened the bomber. On her 50th mission on 3 February 1945, Rose of York was hit by flak over Berlin; she disappeared over the English Channel or North Sea while returning home. (Note: "In a last radio report from Rose of York, pilot Capt. Vernon Daley Jr. stated he was leaving the French coast with two engines out but with the aircraft still under control. The B-17G Rose of York, her crew and Guy Byam were never seen again." Simonsen & O'Malley.)

Without fighter escort and in the face of powerful opposition, the group completed an assault against aircraft factories in central Germany on 11 January 1944, earning a Distinguished Unit Citation (DUC) for the mission. The group participated in the Big Week intensive campaign against the German aircraft industry, 20–25 February 1944. The group earned another DUC for effectively bombing an aircraft assembly plant at Bernberg, Gummersbach, Germany on 22 February, even though escort fighters had abandoned the mission because of weather. Often supported ground forces and attacked interdictory targets in addition to its strategic operations. Hit airfields and marshaling yards in France, Belgium, and Germany in preparation for Normandy. On D-Day, 6 June 1944, the unit raided railroad bridges and coastal guns in support of the assault. Assisted ground forces during the Saint-Lô breakthrough in July, then participated in the airborne portion of Operation Market Garden, the invasion of the Netherlands in September. During the Battle of the Bulge, December 1944 – January 1945, the 306th attacked airfields and marshaling yards to help stop the German advance. Bombed enemy positions in support of the airborne assault across the Rhine River in March 1945, the Operation Varsity portion of the Western Allied invasion of Germany.

Selected for duty with occupational air forces in Germany. The unit engaged in the "Casey Jones" mapping photography project. Group then moved to Giebelstadt, Germany on 1 December 1945, and on 28 February 1946 to Istres, France, where it absorbed the remnants of the 92nd and 384th Bomb Groups. In August 1946 the unit was re-established in Germany at Furstenfeldbruck, and in September 1946 located at Lechfeld. The unit was inactivated on 25 December 1946, although the group had virtually ceased to exist as a flying unit in the late summer of that year. Inactivated December 1946, the group received the Distinguished Unit Citation with one Oak Leaf Cluster and six campaign stars.

=== Cold War ===
The group was reactivated as a Strategic Air Command (SAC) Boeing B-29 Superfortress very heavy bombardment group but was redesignated in 1948 as a medium bombardment group when the B-29 was reclassified as a medium bomber. The group trained in the United States for strategic bombardment operations.

Deliveries of the new Boeing B-47 Stratojet to the USAF began in December 1950, and the aircraft entered service in May 1951 with the group at MacDill Air Force Base, Florida. The 306th was intended to act as a training organization in to prepare future B-47 crews and the 306th's B-47As were primarily training aircraft and not considered as being combat ready; none of the B-47As ever saw any operational duty.

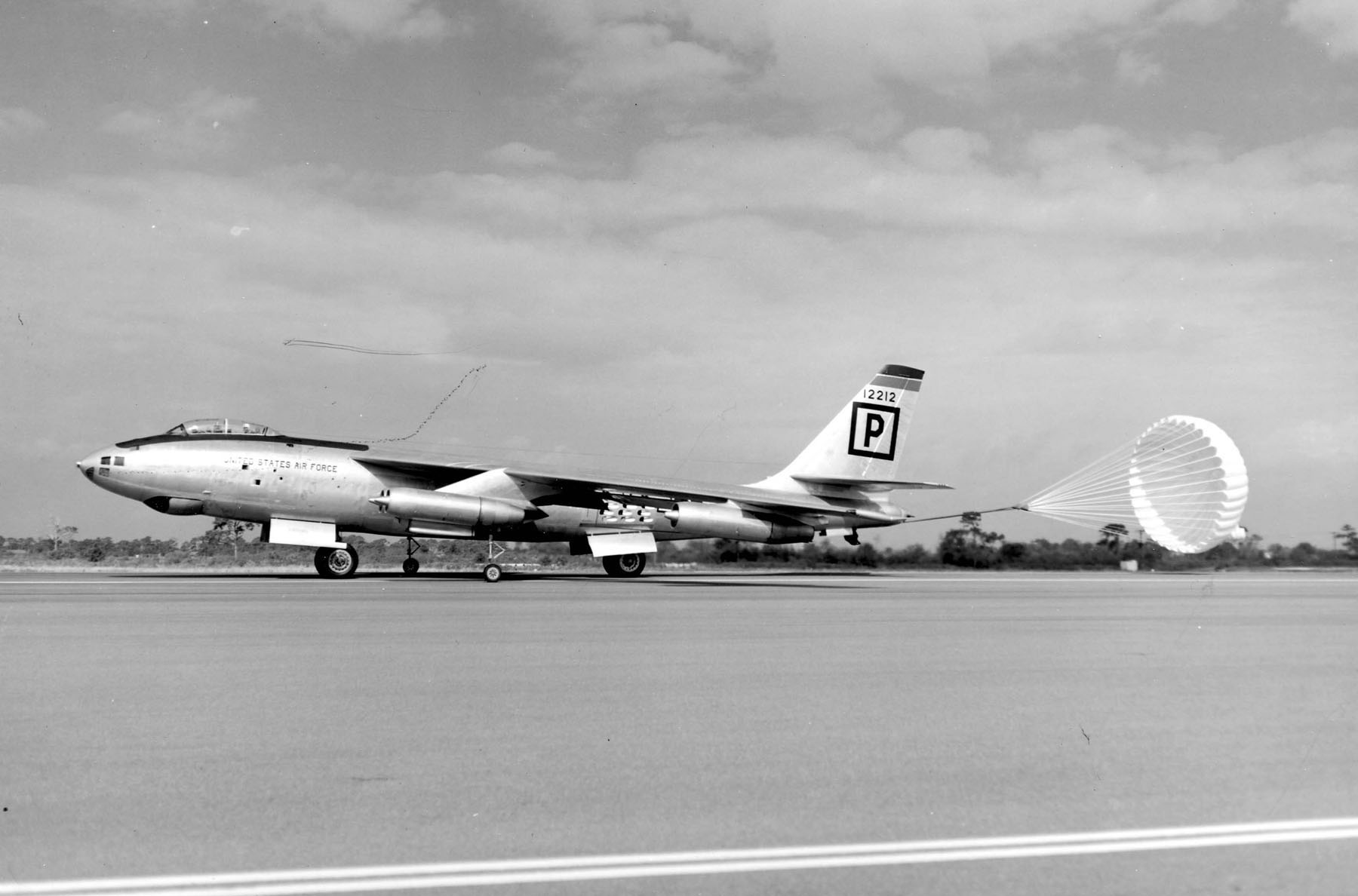
B-47B of the 306th Bombardment Wing landing at MacDill AFB

On 19 November 1951, the 306th received its first operational Boeing B-47B and christened it The Real McCoyin honor of Colonel Michael N. W. McCoy, the 306th's wing commander, who flew it from the Boeing Wichita plant to MacDill AFB.

In 1950 the group added the air refueling mission when the 306th Air Refueling Squadron was activated and assigned to the group. The first Boeing KC-97E Stratofreighter tanker aircraft assigned to Strategic Air Command was delivered to this squadron in 1951. In February 1951, the group became non-operational and its squadrons were attached to the 306th Bombardment Wing at MacDill AFB, Florida. The 306th was inactivated as a group on 16 June 1952 and its operational squadrons were reassigned to the 306th Bombardment Wing as SAC converted its bomb groups to the dual deputy organization. (Note: Under this plan flying squadrons reported to the wing Deputy Commander for Operations and maintenance squadrons reported to the wing Deputy Commander for Maintenance.)

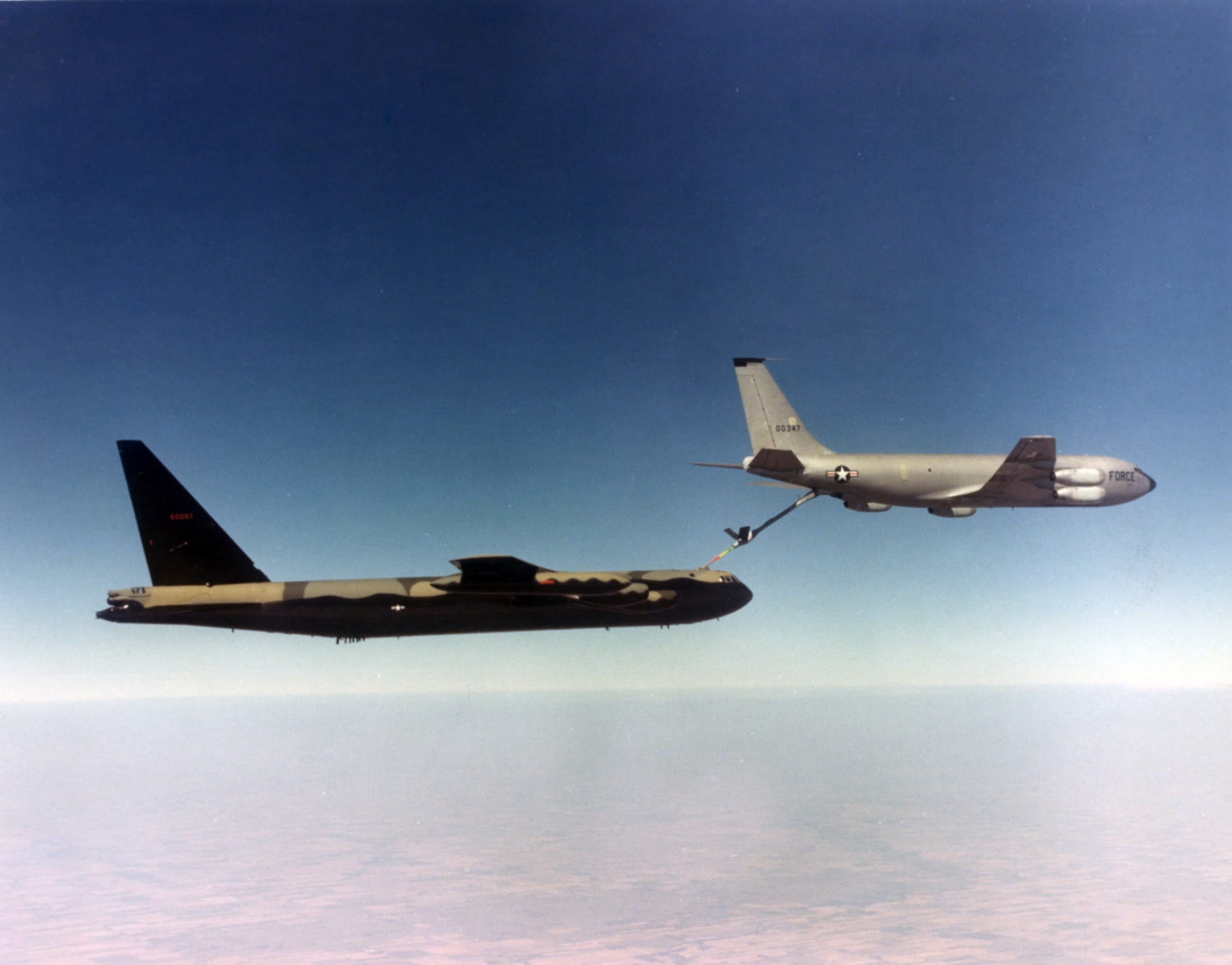
KC-135A AF Ser. No. 60-0347 refuels B-52D AF Ser. No. 55-0057 of the 306 Bombardment Wing (Heavy) deployed from McCoy Air Force Base to Southeast Asia for combat operations over Vietnam. This B-52D is now preserved on display at Maxwell AFB, Alabama

.

=== Modern era ===
The 306th was redesignated the 306th Flying Training Group and activated in October 2004 as part of Air Education and Training Command's (AETC) Nineteenth Air Force at the United States Air Force Academy. In addition to operating the USAF Academy Airfield and the associated aviation training activities for USAFA Cadets at that facility, the 306 FTG also has oversight of the Initial Flight Screening (IFS) program for USAF commissioned officer aviation candidates, including pilots and combat systems officers commissioned through Air Force ROTC and Officer Training School as well as the USAF Academy. IFS is performed under a civilian contract program at Pueblo Memorial Airport, Colorado and the 306 FTG provides a contingent of Air Force personnel to oversee the students and provide military training, supervision, and rigor to the course. With the inactivation of 19 AF in July 2012, the 306th reported to headquarters, AETC. With the reactivation of 19 AF, the group is now a geographically separated unit of the 12th Flying Training Wing at Randolph Air Force Base, Texas.

== Lineage ==
- Constituted as the 306th Bombardment Group (Heavy) on 28 January 1942

Activated on 1 March 1942
Redesignated 306th Bombardment Group, Heavy on 20 August 1943
Inactivated on 25 December 1946
Redesignated 306th Bombardment Group, Very Heavy on 11 June 1947
Activated on 1 July 1947
Redesignated 306th Bombardment Group, Medium on 11 August 1948
Inactivated on 16 June 1952
Redesignated 306th Flying Training Group on 30 September 2004
Activated on 4 October 2004

=== Assignments ===
- Second Air Force, 1 March 1942
- 1st Bombardment Wing, 6 September 1942
- 40th Combat Bombardment Wing, September 1943
- 9th Air Division, 16 May 1945
- 98th Bombardment Wing, September 1945
- 40th Bombardment Wing, 15 November 1945
- 128 Replacement Battalion (AAF/ET Replacement Depot), 22 August 1946
- 40th Bombardment Wing, 13 September 1946
- European Air Materiel Command, 20 – 25 December 1946
- Strategic Air Command, 1 July 1947
- Fifteenth Air Force, 16 December 1948
- Second Air Force, 1 April 1950
- 306th Bombardment Wing, 1 September 1950 – 16 June 1952
- Nineteenth Air Force, 4 October 2004 – 9 July 2012
- Air Education and Training Command, 9 July 2012 – 24 July 2013
- 12th Flying Training Wing, 25 July 2013 – 1 April 2026
- U. S. Air Force Academy, 1 April 2026 - present

=== Components ===
- 1st Flying Training Squadron: 14 December 2007 – present
- 34th Reconnaissance (later, 423d Bombardment) Squadron (RD): 1 March 1942 – 25 December 1946 (detached to 305th Bombardment Group after 25 June 1946); 1 January 1959 – 1 January 1962
- 94th Flying Training Squadron: 4 October 2004 – present
- 98th Flying Training Squadron: 4 October 2004 – present
- 306th Air Refueling Squadron: 1 September 1950 – 16 June 1952 (detached to 306th Bombardment Wing after 10 February 1951)
- 306th Operations Support Squadron: 4 October 2004 – present
- 367th Bombardment Squadron (GY): 1 March 1942 – 25 December 1946; 1 July 1947 – 16 June 1952 (detached to 306th Bombardment Wing after 10 February 1951)
- 368th Bombardment Squadron (BO): 1 March 1942 – 25 December 1946; 1 July 1947 – 16 June 1952 (detached to 306th Bombardment Wing after 10 February 1951)
- 369th Bombardment Squadron (WW): 1 March 1942 – 29 June 1946; 1 July 1947 – 16 June 1952 (detached to 306th Bombardment Wing after 10 February 1951)
- 557th Flying Training Squadron: 4 October 2004 – present

=== Stations ===
- Gowen Field, Idaho, 1 March 1942
- Wendover Field, Utah, c. 6 April – 1 August 1942
- RAF Thurleigh (AAF-111), England, c. 6 September 1942
- AAF Station Giebelstadt, Germany, 25 December 1945
- Istres/Le Tube Airfield, France, 26 February 1946
- AAF Station Fürstenfeldbruck, Germany, 16 August 1946
- AAF Station Lechfeld, Germany, 13 September – 25 December 1946
- Andrews Field (later Andrews Air Force Base), Maryland, 1 July 1947
- MacDill Air Force Base, Florida, 1 August 1948 – 16 June 1952; 1 January 1959 – 31 March 1963
- McCoy Air Force Base, Florida, 1 April 1963 – 1 March 1975
- RAF Mildenhall, United Kingdom, 1 June 1975 – 1 February 1992
- United States Air Force Academy, Colorado, 4 October 2004–present

=== Aircraft ===
- B-17 Flying Fortress, 1942–1946
- B-29 Superfortress, 1948–1951
- B-50 Superfortress, 1950–1951
- B-47 Stratojet, 1951–1952
- KC-97 Stratofreighter, 1951–1952
- B-52 Stratofortress, 1963–1974
- KC-135 Stratotanker, 1963–1992

=== Decorations ===
- Distinguished Unit Citations:
  - Germany: 11 January 1944
  - Germany: 22 February 1944

=== Campaigns ===
- Air Offensive, Europe
- Normandy
- Northern France
- Rhineland
- Ardennes-Alsace
- Central Europe

=== Commanding officers ===
Commanding officers
(1 April 1942 – June 1946)
Col Charles B Overacker Jr.	16 March 1942 – 3 January 1943
Col Frank A Armstrong Jr.	3 January 1943 – 17 February 1943
Col Claude E Putnam	17 February 1943 – 20 June 1943
Col George L Robinson	20 June 1943 – September 1944
Col James S Sutton	September 1944 – 16 April 1945
Col Hudson H Upham	16 April 1945 – May 1946
