= 1st Flying Training Squadron =

US Air Force unit

1st Flying Training Squadron

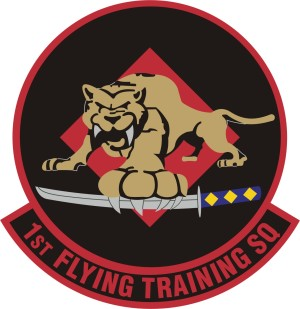
- 1st Flying Training Squadron emblem
- Active: 1969–1971; 1990–1994; 2007–present
- Country: United States
- Branch: United States Air Force
- Role: Basic Aircraft Training
- Part of: Air Education and Training Command
- Garrison/HQ: Pueblo Memorial Airport, Colorado
- Nickname: Tigers
- Decorations: Air Force Outstanding Unit Award

Insignia
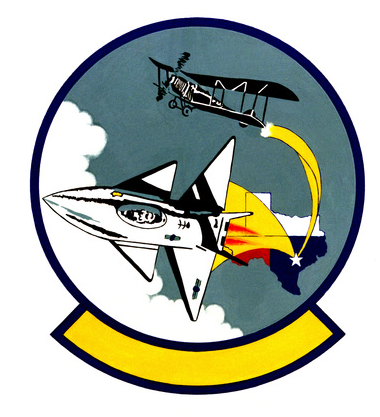
- 1st Flight Screening Squadron emblem

1st Flying Training Squadron is part of the 306th Flying Training Group based at Pueblo Memorial Airport, Colorado. It conducts flight training for all USAF Pilot and Combat Systems Officer trainees, regardless of their commissioning source. It oversees and conducts IFT for over 2,200 Air Force aviator candidates yearly. Constituted as 1st Flying Training Squadron on 9 May 1969 and re-designated as 1st Flying Training Squadron on 28 May 1993.

== Mission ==
The squadron's mission is to screen Air Force aviator candidates for entry into Undergraduate Flight Training as well as to develop outstanding officers through the application of positive life habit patterns and the Air Force's Core Values. The Squadron's mission is to provide primary-stage flight-training to student aviators of the Navy, Marine Corps, coast guard and of several allied nations. Undergraduate pilot training involves many aspects related to the digital era.

== History ==
The 1st Flying Training Squadron provided pilot and navigator proficiency training to all Air Force rated personnel assigned to headquarters in the Washington, D.C. area from 1969 to 1971. It conducted the USAF flight screening program for pilot training candidates between 1990 and 1994 and flew the initial T-3 Firefly operations in early 1994. Current operations include training for all USAF pilots, remotely piloted aircraft (RPA) pilots, and combat systems officers (CSO).

== Lineage ==
1st Flying Training Squadron (first unit)

- Constituted as the 1st Flying Training Squadron on 9 May 1969

Activated on 1 July 1969
Inactivated 30 June 1971
Consolidated with the 1st Flight Screening Squadron as the 1st Flight Screening Squadron on 1 May 1993

1st Flying Training Squadron (second unit)

- Constituted as the 1st Flight Screening Squadron which was constituted on 1 June 1990

Activated on 4 June 1990
Consolidated with the 1st Flying Training Squadron on 1 May 1993
Redesignated 1st Flying Training Squadron on 28 May 1993
Inactivated on 1 April 1994

- Activated on 14 December 2007

=== Assignments ===
- 1st Composite Wing, 1 July 1969 – 30 June 1971
- Officer Training School, 4 June 1990
- 12th Flying Training Wing, 1 July 1991
- 12th Operations Group, 15 December 1991 – 1 Apr 1994
- 306th Flying Training Group, 14 December 2007 – present

=== Stations ===
- Andrews Air Force Base, Maryland, 1 July 1969 – 30 June 1971
- Lackland Air Force Base, Texas, 4 June 1990 – 1 April 1994
- Pueblo Memorial Airport, Colorado, 14 December 2007 – present

=== Aircraft ===
- Convair T-29 Flying Classroom, 1969 –1970
- Lockheed T-33 T-Bird, 1969 –1971
- North American T-39 Sabreliner, 1969 – 1971
- Cessna T-41 Mescalero, 1990 – 1993
- Slingsby T-3 Firefly, 1994
- Diamond DA-20 Eclipse, 2007 – present
