= EGSL =

EGSL may refer to:

- Andrewsfield aerodrome (ICAO: EGSL) in Braintree, Essex, England
- Earl Gregg Swem Library at the College of William & Mary in Williamsburg, Virginia
