= 96th Test Wing =

96th Test Wing

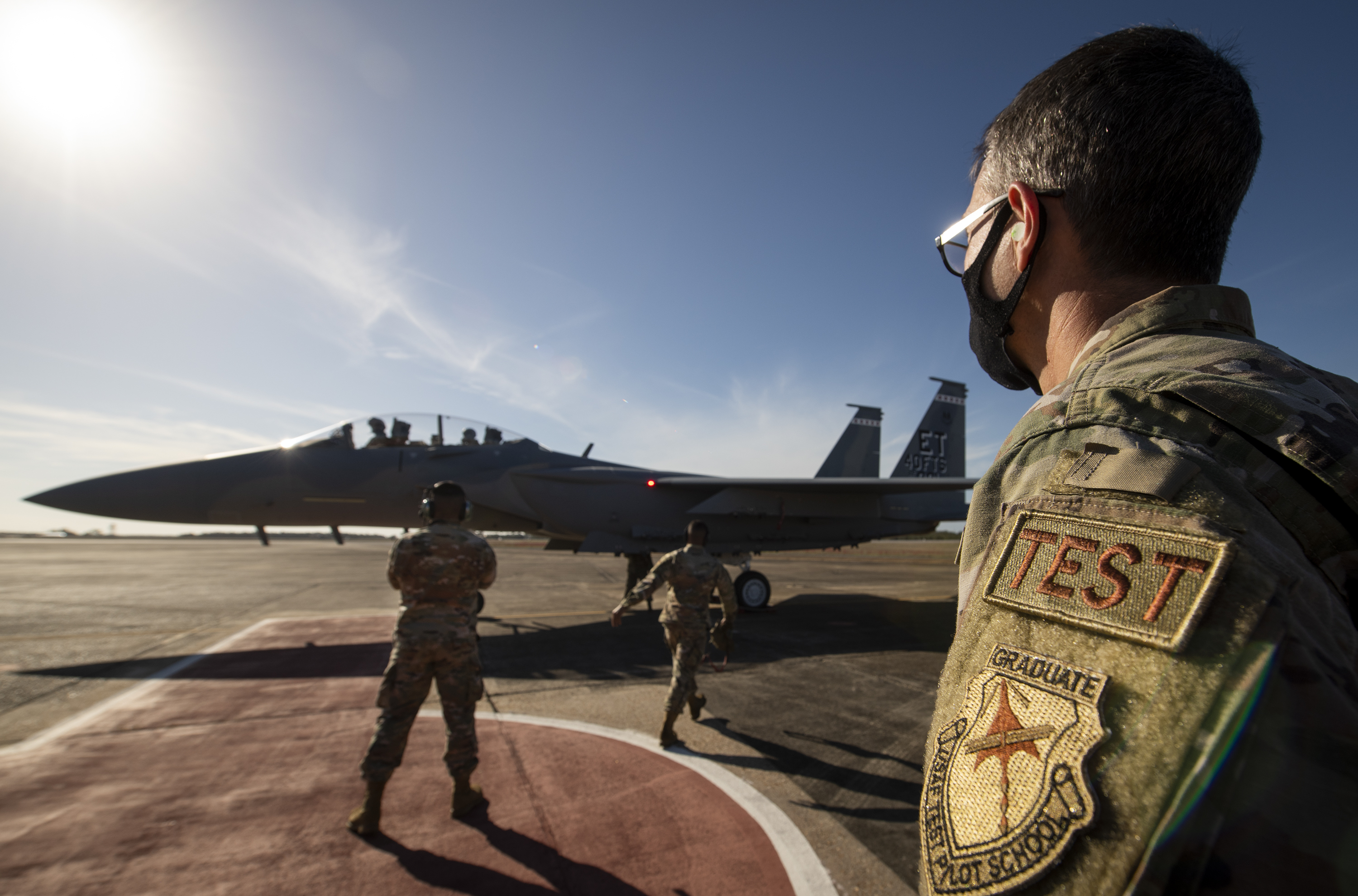
- Boeing F-15EX, the Air Force's newest fighter aircraft, upon arrival to Eglin Air Force Base
- Active: 1942–1945, 1947–1949, 1953–1993, 1994–present
- Country: United States
- Branch: United States Air Force
- Role: Weapons testing and base support
- Part of: Air Force Materiel Command
- Garrison/HQ: Eglin Air Force Base, Florida
- Motto: E Sempre L'ora (Italian for 'It Is Always The Hour')
- Engagements: European Theater of Operations
- Decorations: Distinguished Unit Citation; Air Force Outstanding Unit Award

Commanders
- Current commander: Col. Chris Keithley
- Notable commanders: Archie J. Old, Jr. George Lee Butler; Merlyn Hans Dethlefsen

Insignia
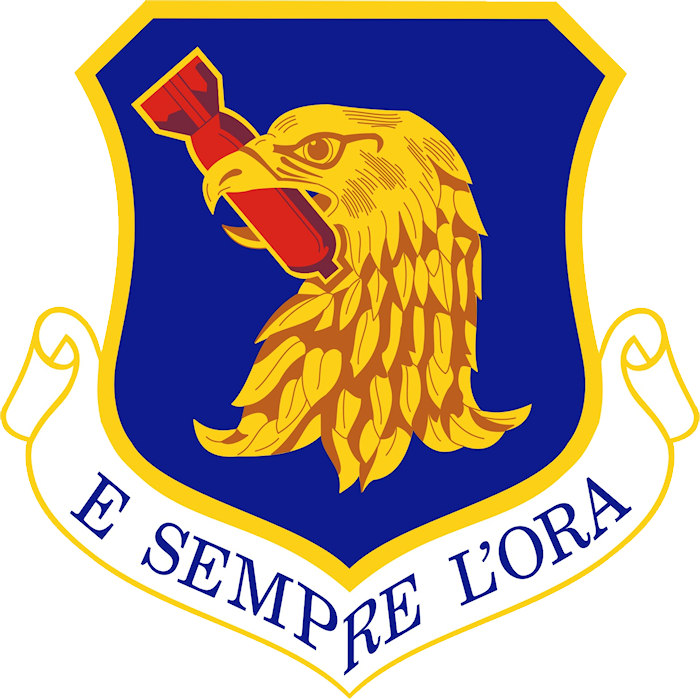
- 96th Test Wing emblem (Note: Approved 18 February 1943 on a different shaped shield.)

The 96th Test Wing is a United States Air Force unit assigned to the Air Force Test Center of Air Force Materiel Command at Eglin Air Force Base, Florida. The wing was activated at Eglin in 1994 as the 96th Air Base Wing, the headquarters for all support units on Eglin, the largest installation in the Air Force. In 2012, it absorbed the mission and resources of the 46th Test Wing and added the mission of testing and evaluating weapons, navigation and guidance systems and command and control systems.

The U.S. Air Force Historical Research Agency has determined that the wing's first predecessor was the 96th Bombardment Group, activated in 1942. After training in the United States, the group began bombing missions flying Boeing B-17 Flying Fortresses. It led the first shuttle mission from Great Britain to Regensburg on 17 August 1943. The group earned two Distinguished Unit Citations for its combat performance. After VE Day, the group returned to the United States and was inactivated. The group was briefly active in the Air Force Reserve from 1947 until 1949.

The 96th Bombardment Wing was activated in 1953 at Altus Air Force Base, Oklahoma and received Boeing B-47 Stratojet bombers the following year as a component of Strategic Air Command's deterrent force. In 1957 the wing moved to Dyess Air Force Base, Texas where it converted to the Boeing B-52 Stratofortress in 1963 and the Rockwell B-1 Lancer in 1985. The wing also operated air refueling aircraft, and during the early 1960s was assigned a squadron of intercontinental ballistic missiles. In 1984, the World War II group was consolidated with the wing. The wing was inactivated in 1993 and its mission, personnel and equipment were transferred to the 7th Bomb Wing, which moved on paper to Dyess when Carswell Air Force Base became a reserve installation.

== Mission ==
The 96th Test Wing performs developmental test and evaluation for Air Force weapons while also providing support for all other units on Eglin Air Force Base as the installation host wing. Eglin is the Department of Defense's largest Air Force installation. Supported units include nine wings and wing equivalents, 11 operating locations and detachments and 35+ associate units.

== Units ==
- 96th Operations Group

The group conducts developmental testing and evaluation of conventional munitions, command and control systems, McDonnell Douglas F-15 Eagle and Fairchild Republic A-10 Thunderbolt II avionics, and navigation systems and guidance systems.

- 96th Cyberspace Test Group

The group plans and executes Developmental Test and Evaluation (DT&E) of Command and Control, Communications, Computer, Intelligence, Surveillance, and Reconnaissance (C4ISR) and Cyber Systems.

- Air Force SEEK EAGLE Office
- 96th Mission Support Group

The group provides fuels, supply, transportation, ground combat training, security, communication, personnel, education, family services, lodging, food service, recreation and logistics planning and deployment support to approximately 20,000 military and civilian personnel and 43,000 retirees. It also deploys combat ready forces in support of worldwide contingency operations.

- 96th Maintenance Group

The group manages and maintains 41 modified test aircraft.

- 96th Medical Group

The group manages and provides health care for 83,000 eligible beneficiaries. It operates a community-based teaching hospital with graduate level programs in family practice, general dentistry and other medical disciplines.

- 96th Civil Engineer Group

The group provides engineering forces to operate and maintain the physical plant, infrastructure, facilities and systems, housing, and the environment, and maintains 11.6 million square feet of physical plant and 3,256 facilities.

- 96th Range Group

The group operates the Eglin Gulf Test Range, which consists of approximately 120,000 square miles of overwater airspace, covering the eastern third of the Gulf of Mexico from the Florida Panhandle to the Florida Keys. The land range covers 724 square miles and contains 70 specific test and training areas, including an approved depleted uranium test range and the only qualified air-to-ground supersonic range east of the Mississippi River.

== History ==
=== World War II ===
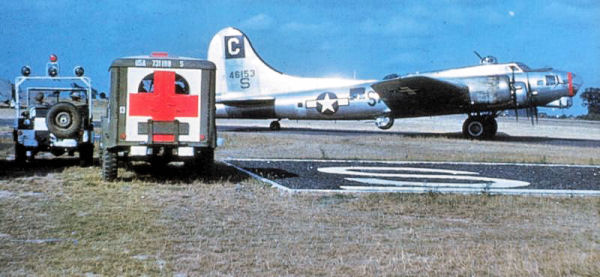
Group B-17F with crash crew (Note: Aircraft is Lockheed Vega built Boeing B-17F-50-VE Flying Fortress serial 42-6153. This aircraft survived the war and was sent to the Reconstruction Finance Corporation at Kingman Army Air Field on 30 October 1945.)

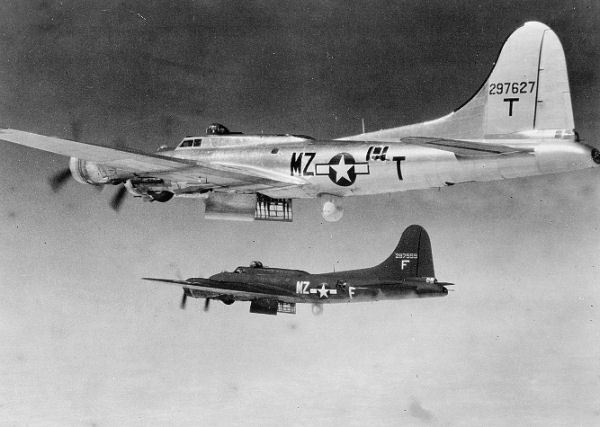
Camouflaged and unpainted 413th Squadron B-17Gs (Note: Aircraft in the foreground is Lockheed/Vega B-17G-20-VE Flying Fortress serial 42-97627.)

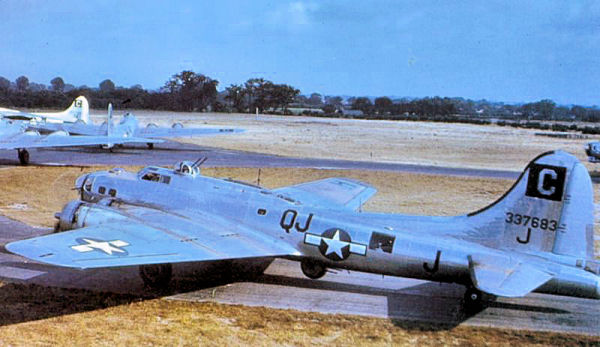
339th Squadron B-17G on hardstand (Note: Aircraft is Boeing B-17G-70-BO Flying Fortress serial 43-37683.)

The group was first activated in July 1942 at Salt Lake City Army Air Base, Utah as the 96th Bombardment Group, with the 337th, 338th, 339th and 413th Bombardment Squadrons (Note: The 413th Squadron was constituted as the 23d Reconnaissance Squadron, but was redesignated before it was made active. Maurer, Combat Squadrons, p. 505.) assigned as its original components. After moving to Gowen Field, Idaho the group received its initial cadre. The group trained at various bases in the northwestern United States.

In November 1942 the group moved to Pocatello Army Air Base, Idaho, where it acted as an Operational Training Unit (OTU). OTUs were oversized parent units that provided cadres to form "satellite groups." In early 1943, the 96th relocated to Pyote Army Air Base, Texas, where it resumed its combat training. In April 1943 the group began its overseas movement. The air echelon ferried its bombers via the North Atlantic Ferry Route, while the ground echelon proceeded to the New York Port of Embarkation and sailed on the RMS Queen Elizabeth for Greenock, Scotland.

The group arrived at RAF Grafton Underwood England in May 1943, for duty with Eighth Air Force. The group was assigned to the 45th Combat Bombardment Wing of the 3d Bombardment Division. The group commenced combat operations on 14 May with an attack on Kortrijk (Courtrai), after an aborted mission the previous day. The 96th moved east at the end of May to RAF Andrews Field. The 96th appears to have only carried out one mission while based at Andrews. On 29 May 1943 they took part in a raid on Rennes naval storage depot from which one B-17 failed to return. However, Eighth Air Force was not pleased with the initial performance of the Martin B-26 Marauder units assigned to it and decided to move them from their bases in north Suffolk to stations nearer the continent. As the first step in this move, the 386th Bombardment Group left its base at RAF Snetterton Heath for RAF Boxted. The 96th took the 386th's place at Snetterton Heath the following day, leaving its previous base available for the 322d Bombardment Group.

As the most conveniently reached station from 3d Air Division Headquarters at Elveden Hall, Snetterton Heath units often led to major operations carrying commanding generals. General Curtis LeMay led the Regensburg shuttle mission to North Africa flying out of this base, and the group received a Distinguished Unit Citation for withstanding severe assaults by enemy fighters. The 96th also led the 3d Division on the Schweinfurt mission of 14 October 1943. In addition, the 96th attacked shipyards, harbors, railway yards, aerodromes, oil refineries, aircraft factories, and other industrial targets in Germany, France, the Netherlands, Belgium, Norway, Poland, Hungary, and Czechoslovakia.

The 96th received another Distinguished Unit Citation for leading the 45th Wing a great distance through heavy clouds and intense flak to raid important aircraft component factories in Poland on 9 April 1944. Other significant targets attacked by the group included airfields at Bordeaux and Augsburg; marshalling yards at Kiel, Hamm, Brunswick, and Gdynia; aircraft factories at Chemnitz, Hanover, and Diósgyőr; oil refineries at Merseburg and Brüx, and chemical works in Wiesbaden, Ludwigshafen, and Neunkirchen.

In addition to its strategic operations, the 96th was occasionally diverted to support ground forces. These missions included bombing coastal defenses, railway bridges, gun emplacements, and field batteries in the battle area prior to and during D-Day in June 1944. It attacked enemy positions to support the breakthrough at Saint-Lô in July 1944 and aided the campaign in France in August by striking roads and road junctions and by dropping supplies to the Maquis. In the early months of 1945, the group struck lines of communications supplying German armies on the western front.

After V-E Day, the 96th flew food to the Netherlands and transported redeploying personnel to French Morocco, Northern Ireland, France, and Germany. the group was programmed to move to Germany for occupation duty. However, plans were revised in September 1945. In November 1945 its aircraft were flown back to the United States or transferred to other units. Two of its squadrons were inactivated in late November and the others in mid-December. The group headquarters' remaining personnel left Snetterton Heath, sailing on the USS Lake Champlain on 12 December and arriving at Camp Kilmer New Jersey on 20 December 1945, where it was inactivated the following day.

=== Air Force Reserve ===
The 96th Bombardment Group was activated as a reserve unit under Air Defense Command (ADC) on 29 May 1947 at Gunter Field, Alabama. It was initially assigned three of its World War II units, the 337th Bombardment Squadron, located at Gunter, and the 338th and 339th Bombardment Squadrons, stationed at Hawkins Field in Mississippi. In July, it added three additional squadrons, the 413th Bombardment Squadron at Keesler Air Force Base in Mississippi, the 546th Bombardment Squadron at Lovell Field in Tennessee, and the 547th Bombardment Squadron at Smith Reynolds Airport in North Carolina. In October, however, the two squadrons at Jackson were transferred to the 384th Bombardment Group.

At Gunter, the group conducted routine training activities under the supervision of the 476th AAF Base Unit (later the 2586th Air Force Reserve Training Center). President Truman's reduced 1949 defense budget required reductions in the number of units in the Air Force, and the 96th Group and 2586th Center were inactivated in July 1949 and not replaced as flying operations at Gunter ceased.

=== Strategic Air Command ===
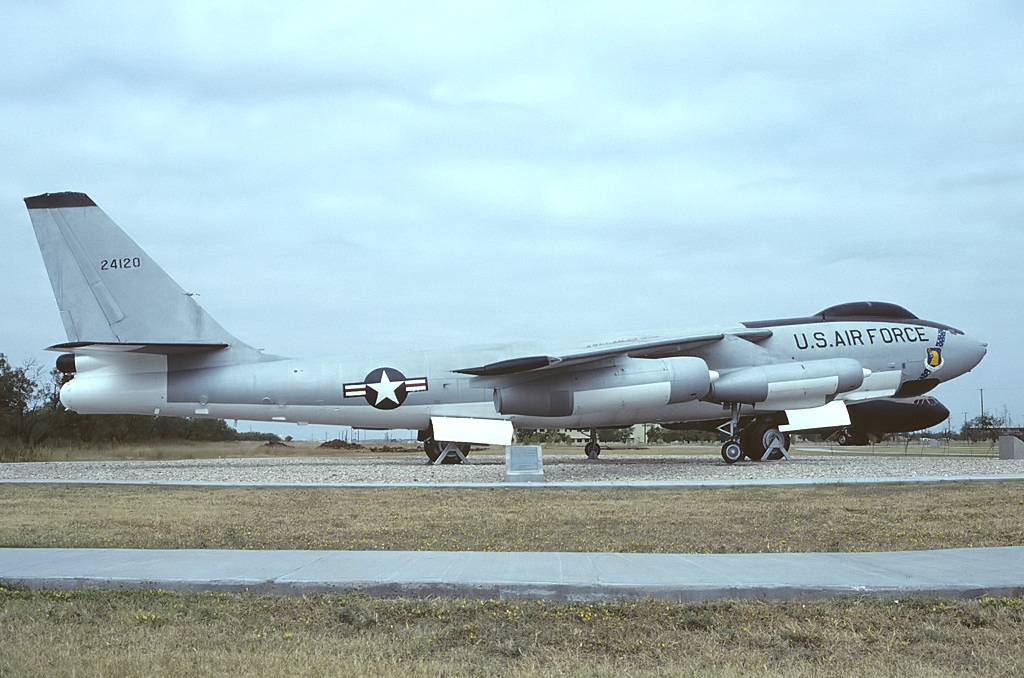
B-47E in markings of 96th Wing

The 96th Bombardment Wing was activated in November 1953 at Altus Air Force Base, Oklahoma. Wing headquarters and most of the wing components were not manned until March 1954; those components were controlled by the 96th Air Base Group, whose commander served additional duty as the 96th's wing commander. The wing soon received Boeing KC-97 Stratofreighters and began air refueling operations in March 1954.

The wing began training with Boeing B-47E Stratojet swept-wing medium bombers, capable of flying at high subsonic speeds, in April 1955 in support of SAC's global commitments. It deployed to Andersen Air Force Base Guam from January through April 1957. The wing joined the 341st Bombardment Wing at Dyess Air Force Base, Texas on 8 September 1957.

The 4th Strategic Support Squadron, a strategic airlift squadron flying Douglas C-124 Globemaster IIs, moved to Dyess from Ellsworth Air Force Base in 1957. It was assigned to the wing from September 1959 until it was inactivated in March 1961. The wing added intercontinental ballistic missiles to its nuclear strike force when the 578th Strategic Missile Squadron, with Convair SM-65 Atlas missiles joined the wing in July 1961. The first Atlas missile went on alert in April 1962. The wing's Atlases were phased out in March 1965.

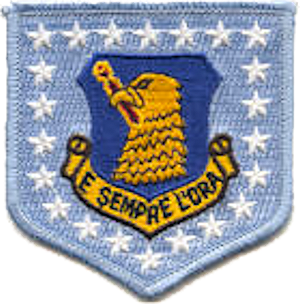
Wing emblem during SAC era, surrounded by a bordure in the colors of the SAC riband

Soon after detection of Soviet missiles in Cuba, on 22 October 1962, SAC's B-47s were dispersed. Dispersing bombers carried nuclear weapons in ferrying configuration. On 24 October SAC went to DEFCON 2, placing all its combat aircraft on alert. Most dispersal bases were civilian airfields with Air Force Reserve or Air National Guard units. The B-47s were configured for execution of the Emergency War Order as soon as possible after dispersal. On 15 November, 1/6 of the dispersed B-47s were recalled to their home bases. On 21 November SAC relaxed its alert posture to DEFCON 3. its dispersed B-47s and their supporting tankers were recalled on 24 November. On 27 November SAC returned to normal alert posture.

By the early 1960s, the B-47 was being phased out of SAC's strategic arsenal. In June 1961, the 341st Bombardment Wing had been inactivated and the 96th became the single Stratojet wing at Dyess. In March 1963, two of the wing's bomber squadrons were inactivated, and by December 1963, its remaining squadron had converted to the Boeing B-52 Stratofortress. The 96th received B-52Cs from the 99th Bomb Wing from Walker Air Force Base in Roswell, New Mexico. In 1970 and again 1972–1973, most wing personnel and all of its aircraft and crews deployed to the Pacific in support of the War in Vietnam. During most of this time, the 96BW also supported Operation Chrome Dome missions over the North Pole in the Cold War.

From 1980, the wing's 917th Air Refueling Squadron's Boeing KC-135A Stratotanker aircraft regularly deployed to Europe, Alaska, and the Pacific to support SAC tanker task force requirements.

The 337th Bombardment Squadron became the first squadron to operate the Rockwell B-1B Lancer, after the arrival of the first aircraft in June 1985. In October 1986, B-1Bs assumed SAC Cold War alert duties for the first time. In addition, the 338th Combat Crew Training Squadron received B-1Bs in June 1992.

917th Squadron tankers provided refueling support to units involved in Operation Just Cause, the December 1989 incursion that replaced Manuel Noriega as ruler of Panama. The following August, they ferried personnel and equipment to Andersen Air Force Base, Guam for further movement to Southwest Asia. In December 1990 all remaining tanker aircraft and crews, except those on alert duty, were sent to Incirlik Air Base, Turkey in support of Operation Desert Storm.

=== Post Cold War ===
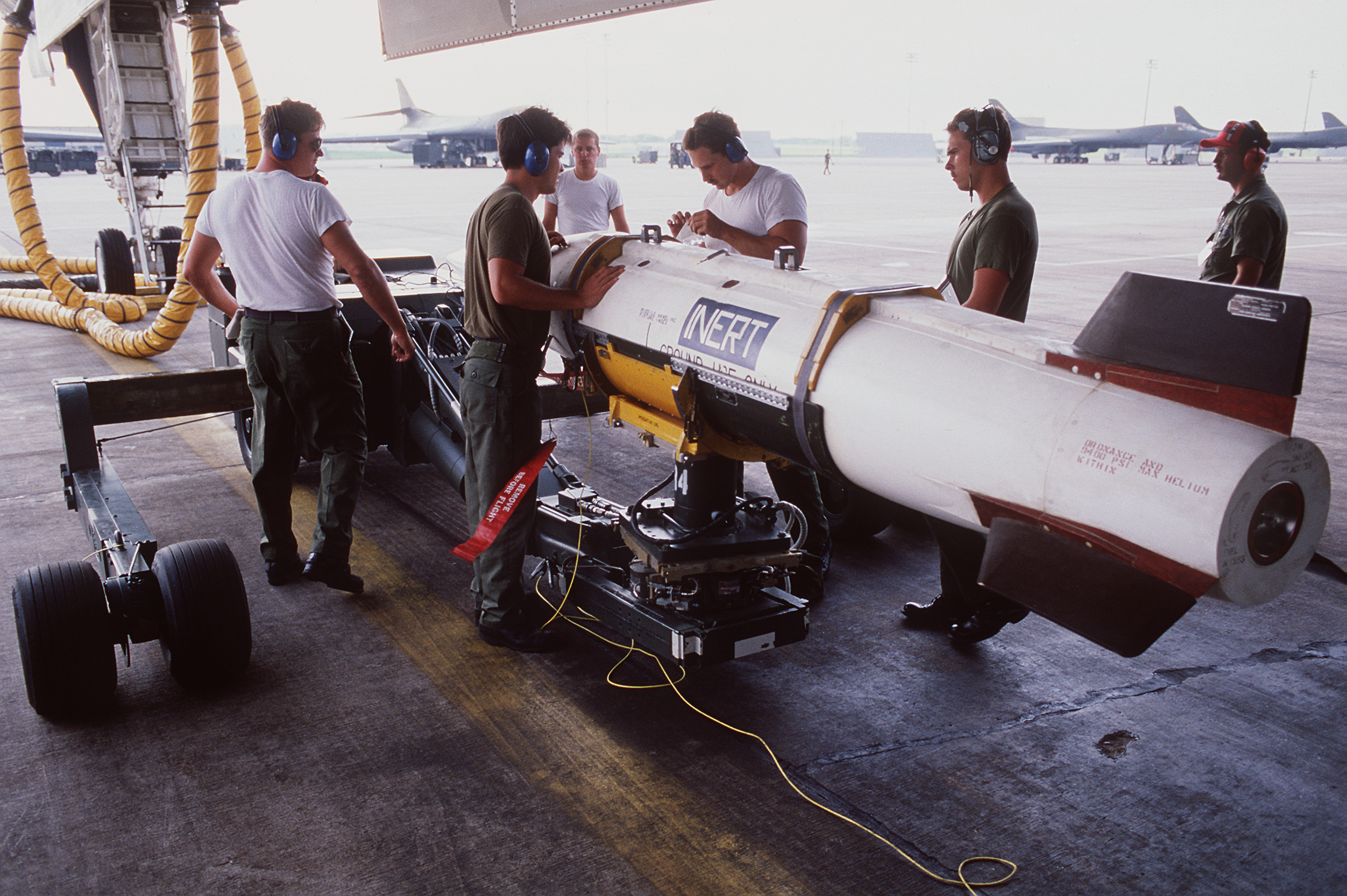
96th Munitions Maintenance Squadron airmen inspect an inert AGM-69 SRAM after removing it from the bomb bay of a Rockwell B-1 Lancer (Note: Christened the Star of Abilene, serial 83-0065. Pictured on the flightline at Dyess AFB after flying its last mission in 2003.)

On 1 September 1991, the wing was redesignated as the 96th Wing and implemented the objective wing concept. It was relieved from assignment to SAC and assigned to Air Combat Command on 1 June 1992. Also on 1 June 1992, the 917th Squadron acquired KC-135Qs in conjunction with the drawdown of tanker operations at Beale Air Force Base, California.

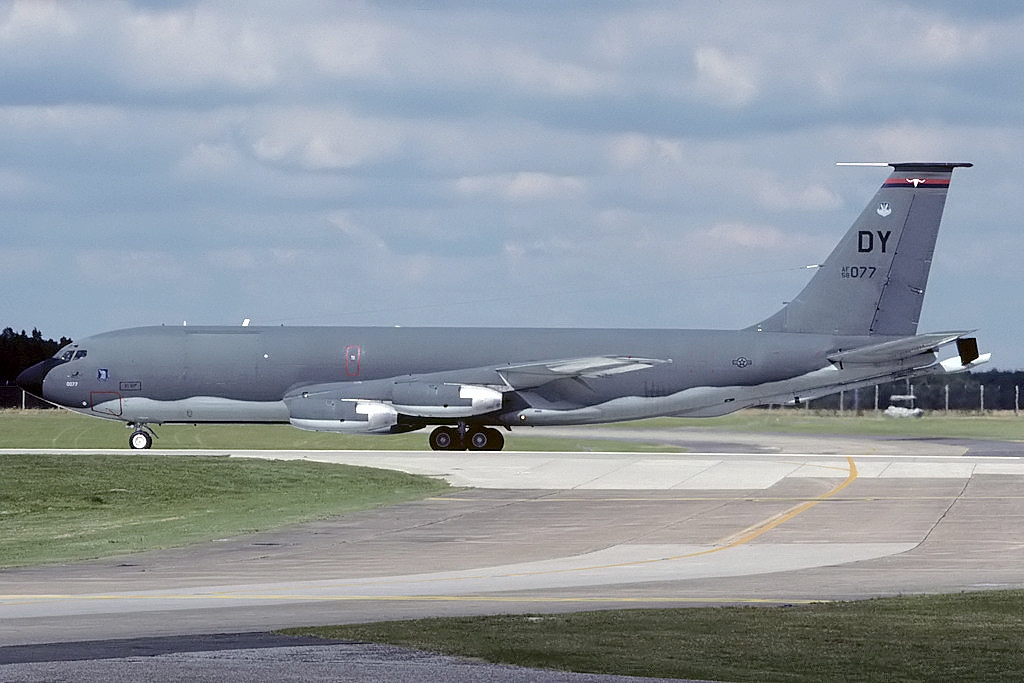
Wing KC-135Q Stratotanker

When tanker squadrons were reassigned to Air Mobility Command, the 917th was reassigned to the 43d Operations Group, headquartered at Malmstrom Air Force Base, Montana on 30 September 1993.

On 1 October 1993 the 96th Wing inactivated, replaced by the 7th Wing, which moved without personnel or equipment due to the 1993 Base Realignment and Closure Commission transfer of Carswell Air Force Base, Texas to the U.S. Navy . The B-1Bs of the 337th Squadron were reassigned to the 7th Wing, and the 337th absorbed the B-1s of the inactivating 338th Crew Training Squadron as part of the new wing.

The 96th Air Base Wing stood up as a non-flying organization on 15 March 1994. It assumed the mission of supporting the Air Armament Center and associate units at Eglin Air Force Base, Florida.

=== Air Force Materiel Command Restructuring ===
The wing became the 96th Test Wing, assuming the 46th Test Wing mission, as part of the 2012 Air Force Materiel Command Restructuring. It is the test and evaluation unit for Air Force air-delivered weapons, navigation and guidance systems, command and control systems and Air Force Special Operations Command systems.

The wing performs developmental test and evaluation for a wide variety of customers including: Air Force Systems Program Offices, the Air Force Research Laboratory, Materiel Command's logistics and product centers; major commands; other Department of Defense services and U.S. government agencies (Department of Transportation, NASA, etc.); foreign military sales; and private industry.

As of 18 July 2012, the 46th Test Group at Holloman Air Force Base was 'reflagged' as the 96th Test Group. It operated test facilities for high speed sled track testing, navigation and guidance system testing, radar signature measurements, weapon systems flight testing, and Air Force liaison for all AF programs tested at White Sands Missile Range. The group's Operating Location AA at Kirtland Air Force Base, New Mexico was responsible for directed energy and high energy laser testing and Operating Location AC at Wright-Patterson Air Force Base, Ohio, and performed landing gear and aircraft survivability tests. The Air Force Test Center began a reorganization in 2015 to move some units within the AFTC from the 96th Test Wing over to the Arnold Engineering Development Complex (AEDC). The largest change was the transfer of the 96th Test Group to the AEDC and its redesignation as the 704th Test Group, effective 1 December 2016.

== Lineage ==
Group

- Constituted as the 96th Bombardment Group (Heavy), on 28 January 1942

Activated on 15 July 1942

- Redesignated 96th Bombardment Group, Heavy on 20 August 1943

Inactivated on 21 December 1945

- Redesignated 96th Bombardment Group, Very Heavy, on 13 May 1947

Activated in the reserve on 29 May 1947
Inactivated on 27 June 1949

- Consolidated with the 96th Bombardment Wing, Heavy on 31 January 1984 as the 96th Bombardment Wing, Heavy

Wing

- Constituted as the 96th Bombardment Wing, Medium on 6 November 1953

Activated on 18 November 1953
Redesignated 96th Strategic Aerospace Wing on 1 April 1962
Redesignated 96th Bombardment Wing, Heavy on 31 March 1972

- Consolidated with the 96th Bombardment Group, Heavy on 31 January 1984

Redesignated 96th Wing on 1 September 1991
Inactivated 1 October 1993

- Redesignated 96th Air Base Wing and activated on 15 March 1994

Redesignated 96th Test Wing on 18 July 2012

=== Assignments ===
- Second Air Force, 15 July 1942 – c. 4 April 1943
- 4th Bombardment Wing (later 4th Combat Bombardment Wing), c. 14 April 1943 (attached to 401st Provisional Combat Wing 6 – 19 June 1943, then 403d Provisional Combat Wing)
- 45 Combat Bombardment Wing, 14 September 1943
- 3d Air Division, 18 June 1945
- 1st Air Division, 12 August 1945
- 3d Air Division, 28 September – 12 December 1945
- New York Port of Embarkation, 20 – 21 December 1945
- 19th Bombardment Wing (later 19th Air Division), 29 May 1947 – 27 June 1949
- Eighth Air Force, 18 November 1953
- Fifteenth Air Force, 1 April 1955 (attached to 3d Air Division, 10 January – 7 April 1957)
- 819th Air Division (later 819th Strategic Aerospace Division) 3 September 1957
- 19th Air Division, 2 July 1966
- 12th Air Division, 1 July 1973
- Fifteenth Air Force, 15 July 1988
- Eighth Air Force, 1 September 1991 – 1 October 1993
- Air Force Development Test Center (later Air Armament Center), 15 March 1994
- Air Force Test Center, 1 October 2012 – present

=== Components ===
Groups

- 46th Operations Group: Attached 18 July 2012 – 1 October 2012
- 46th Test Group: Attached 18 July 2012 – 1 October 2012
- 46th Range Group: Attached 18 July 2012 – 1 October 2012
- 96th Operations Group: 1 September 1991 – 1 October 1993, 1 October 2012 – present
- 96th Logistics Group (later 96th Maintenance Group): 1 September 1991 – 1 October 1993. c. 15 March 1994 – present
- 96th Test Group: 1 October 2012 – present
- 96th Air Base Group (later 96th Combat Support Group, 96th Support Group, 96th Mission Support Group): 18 November 1953 – 12 December 1957, 25 June 1961 – 1 October 1993, 15 March 1994 – present
- 96th Civil Engineer Group: 15 March 1994 – present
- 96th Range Group: 1 October 2012 – present

Squadrons

- 4th Strategic Support Squadron: 1 September 1959 – 15 March 1961
- 11th Air Refueling Squadron: attached 16 December 1957 – March 1958
- 96th Air Refueling Squadron: 18 November 1953 – 3 December 1957 (detached 5 October – 20 November 1954, 1 August – 14 September 1955, 18–31 January 1956, 25 June – 9 October 1956, and 10 January – 7 April 1957)
- 321st Air Refueling: attached 3 July – 8 November 1954
- 337th Bombardment Squadron: 15 July 1942 – 29 November 1945; 29 May 1947 – 27 June 1949; 18 November 1953 – 15 March 1963; 15 September 1963 – 1 September 1991
- 338th Bombardment Squadron (later 338th Strategic Bombardment Training Squadron, 338th Combat Crew Training Squadron): 15 July 1942 – 15 December 1945; 29 May – 8 October 1947; 18 November 1953 – 15 March 1963; 1 July 1986 – 1 September 1991
- 339th Bombardment Squadron: 15 July 1942 – 29 November 1945; 29 May – 8 October 1947; 18 November 1953 – 15 March 1963
- 380th Air Refueling Squadron: attached 8 November 1954 – 1 April 1955
- 413th Bombardment Squadron: 15 July 1942 – 19 December 1945; 17 July 1947 – 27 June 1949; 1 November 1958 – 1 January 1962
- 546th Bombardment Squadron: 16 July 1947 – 27 June 1949
- 547th Bombardment Squadron: 16 July 1947 – 27 June 1949
- 578th Strategic Missile Squadron: 1 July 1961 – 25 March 1965
- 917th Air Refueling Squadron: attached 1 – 14 January 1965, assigned 15 January 1965 – 1 September 1991
- 4018th Combat Crew Training Squadron: 15 March 1985 – 1 July 1986

=== Stations ===
- Salt Lake City Army Air Base, Utah, 15 July 1942
- Gowen Field, Idaho, 6 August 1942
- Walla Walla Army Air Base, Washington, 14 August 1942 (ground echelon), 1 September 1942 (air echelon)
- Rapid City Army Air Base, South Dakota, 30 September 1942
- Pocatello Army Air Base, Idaho, 1 November 1942
- Pyote Army Air Base, Texas, 3 January – March 1943
- RAF Grafton Underwood (Station 106), England, April 1943
- Andrews Field (Station 485), England, May 1943
- RAF Snetterton Heath (Station 138), England, 12 June 1943 – 12 December 1945
- Camp Kilmer, New Jersey, 20 – 21 December 1945
- Gunter Field (later Gunter Air Force Base), Alabama, 29 May 1947 – 27 June 1949
- Altus Air Force Base, Oklahoma, 18 November 1953
- Dyess Air Force Base, Texas, 8 September 1957 – 1 October 1993
- Eglin Air Force Base, Florida, 15 March 1994 – present

=== Major weapons systems ===
- Boeing B-17 Flying Fortress (1943–1945)
- Boeing KC-97 Stratofreighter (1954–1958)
- Boeing B-47 Stratojet (1955–1963)
- Douglas C-124 Globemaster II (1959–1961)
- Convair SM-65 Atlas (1962–1965)
- Boeing B-52 Stratofortress (1963–1985)
- Boeing KC-135 Stratotanker (1965–1993)
- Rockwell B-1 Lancer (1985–1993)
- Fairchild Republic A-10 Thunderbolt II (2012–2025)
- Northrop AT-38 Talon (2012–present)
- Lockheed Martin C-130 Hercules (2012–present)
- Boeing F-15 Eagle (2012–present)
- Lockheed Martin F-16 Fighting Falcon (2012–present)
- Bell UH-1 Huey (2012–present)
- Boeing F-15EX Eagle II (2022–present)
- MH-139A Grey Wolf (2022–present)

== See also ==
- List of B-47 units of the United States Air Force
- List of B-52 Units of the United States Air Force
