= 339th Bombardment Squadron =

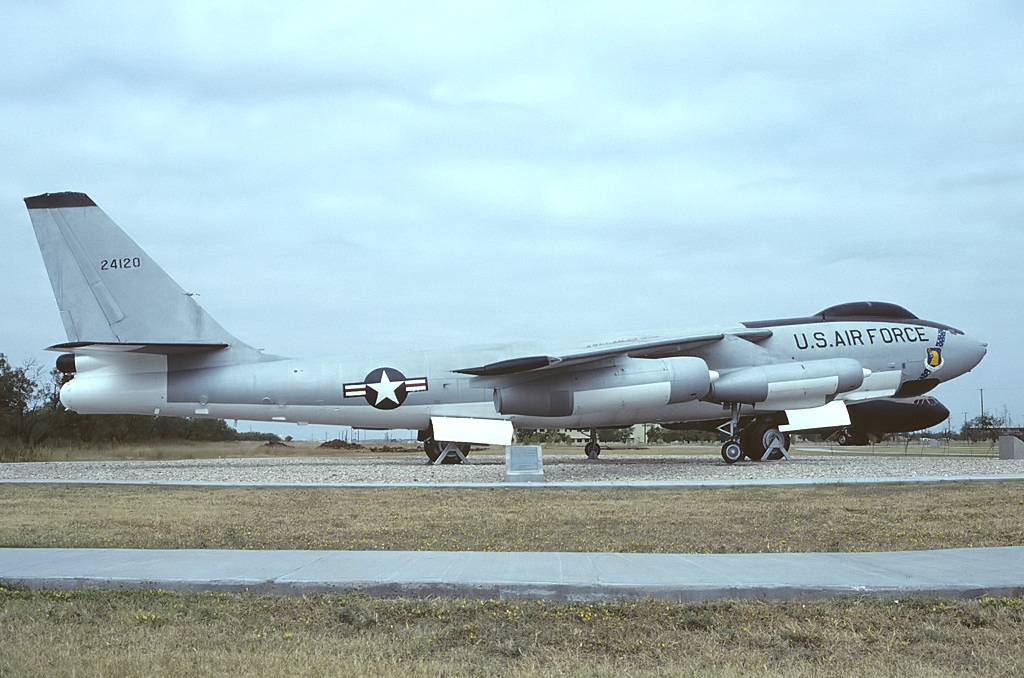
- B-47 Stratojet in 96th Bombardment Wing markings
- Active: 1942–1945; 1947–1949; 1953–1963
- Country: United States
- Branch: United States Air Force
- Role: Medium bomber
- Engagements: European Theater of Operations
- Decorations: Distinguished Unit Citation; Air Force Outstanding Unit Award

Insignia
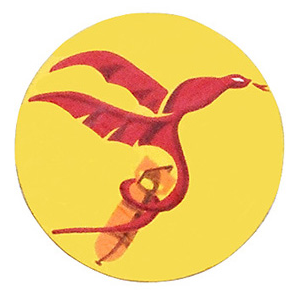
- 339th Bombardment Squadron emblem (Note: Approved 27 October 1942. Description: On a disc yellow, a red cobra in flight, tail entwined about an orange aerial bomb, nose to base)
- World War II fuselage code: QJ

The 339th Bombardment Squadron is an inactive United States Air Force unit. It was last assigned to the 96th Bombardment Wing at Dyess Air Force Base, Texas, where it was inactivated on 15 March 1963.

The squadron was first activated during World War II. It served in the European Theater of Operations, where it participated in the strategic bombing campaign against Germany and earned two Distinguished Unit Citations for its combat actions. Following V-E Day, the squadron returned to the United States and was inactivated.

This squadron was again active from 1947 to 1949 in the reserves, although it was apparently never fully manned or equipped. It was active as a Boeing B-47 Stratojet squadron in Strategic Air Command from 1953 to 1963.

== History ==
=== World War II ===
==== Initial organization and training ====
The squadron was activated at Salt Lake City Army Air Base in July 1942 as the 339th Bombardment Squadron, one of the original squadrons of the 96th Bombardment Group. In early August the squadron moved to Gowen Field, Idaho, where it received its initial cadre, then, later that month to Walla Walla Army Air Base, Washington to begin training with the Boeing B-17 Flying Fortress. On 1 November, the squadron moved to Pocatello Army Air Field, Idaho, where it began to act as a Operational Training Unit. It moved to Pyote Army Air Base, Texas in January 1943 and resumed training for overseas movement.

The air echelon of the squadron began ferrying their B-17s via the North Atlantic ferry route, stopping at Presque Isle Army Air Field, Newfoundland, Iceland, then at Prestwick Airport, Scotland on 4 April 1943. The ground echelon left Pyote on 16 April for Camp Kilmer, New Jersey in the New York Port of Embarkation, sailing on the RMS Queen Elizabeth on 5 May and arriving in Scotland on 13 May.

==== Combat in the European Theater ====
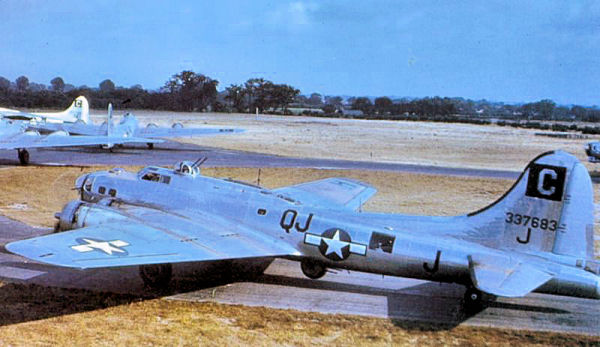
Squadron B-17G Flying Fortress (Note: Aircraft is Boeing B-17G-70-BO Flying Fortress, serial 43-37683, Round Trip Ticket. This plane survived the war and returned to the United States, where it was sold for scrap in November 1946. Baugher, Joe (19 January 2023). "1943 USAF Serial Numbers". Joe Baugher..)

The squadron was established at RAF Great Saling by 12 May, and flew its first combat mission the next day, an attack against the airfield at Saint-Omer, France. However, the squadron was late assembling and did not complete the mission. The following day, it made its first strike on a target, an airfield at Courtrai. (Note: After action reports described the bombing as "ineffective." However, later intelligence found that damage to the facilities was severe enough to force III/Jagdgeschwader 26 to move from the field. Freeman (1970), p. 47.) Eighth Air Force decided to transfer its new Martin B-26 Marauder units from VIII Bomber Command to VIII Air Support Command and concentrate them on bases closer to the European continent. As a result, the 322d Bombardment Group moved to Great Saling on 12 June, forcing the 96th Group and its squadrons to relocate to RAF Snetterton Heath, which would be its combat station for the rest of the war.

The squadron engaged in the strategic bombing campaign against Germany. It attacked airdromes, aircraft factories, harbors, oil refineries, railway yards, shipyards, and other industrial targets in Germany, France, the Netherlands, Belgium, Norway, Poland, Hungary, and Czechoslovakia. Targets included airfields at Bordeaux and Augsburg; marshalling yards at Kiel, Hamm, Braunschweig, and Gdynia; aircraft factories at Chemnitz, Hanover, and Diósgyőr; oil refineries at Merseburg and Most, and chemical works in Wiesbaden, Ludwigshafen, and Neunkirchen.

During an attack on the Messerschmitt factory at Regensberg on 17 August 1943, the squadron was without escort after its escorting Republic P-47 Thunderbolts reached the limit of their range. It withstood repeated attacks, first by enemy Messerschmitt Bf 109 and Focke-Wulf Fw 190 interceptors, then by Messerschmitt Bf 110 and Junkers Ju 88 night fighters, to strike its target, earning its first Distinguished Unit Citation (DUC). This was a "shuttle" mission, with the squadron recovering on bases in North Africa, rather than returning to England.

The squadron formed part of the leading 45th Combat Bombardment Wing formation on very long-range mission against the Focke-Wulf Fw 190 factory at Poznań. Heavy clouds led an entire wing and some combat boxes of the 45th Wing to abandon the mission and return to England. The 96th Group and one other combat box proceeded to the target and were surprised to find they were able to bomb visually, although the target was defended by intense flak fire, earning the squadron its second DUC.

In addition to strategic operations, the squadron participated in air support and interdiction missions. In the preparation for Operation Overlord, the invasion of Normandy, it bombed coastal defenses, railway bridges, gun emplacements, and field batteries in the battle area prior to and during D-Day in June 1944. It attacked enemy positions in support of Operation Cobra, the breakout at Saint Lo in July 1944, aiding the campaign in France in August by striking roads and road junctions, and by dropping supplies to the Maquis. During the early months of 1945, it attacked the communications supplying German armies on the western front.

After V-E Day, the 339th flew food missions to the Netherlands and hauled redeployed personnel to French Morocco, Ireland, France, and Germany. The squadron was scheduled for occupation duty, but that plan was cancelled in September 1945. In November 1945 its aircraft were flown back to the United States or transferred to other units in Europe. The unit's remaining personnel returned to the United States and it was inactivated at the Port of Embarkation on 29 November 1945.

=== Reserve operations ===
The squadron was activated in the reserves under Air Defense Command (ADC) at Jackson Army Air Base, Mississippi on 29 May 1947, nominally as a heavy bomber unit, and was again assigned to the 96th Group, stationed at Gunter Field, Alabama. In October, the squadron was reassigned to the 384th Bombardment Group at Nashville Municipal Airport, Tennessee. At Jackson, the squadron's training was supervised by the 4103rd AAF Base Unit (Reserve Training), later the 2588th AF Reserve Flying Training Center.

As the post war Air Force took shape, the National Guard was considered the first line of reserve. Reserve units like the 339th got what was left over after National Guard units received facilities, equipment and aircraft. Aircraft were allotted to reserve units as a means of maintaining flying proficiency, not for combat readiness and were overwhelmingly trainers, and no heavy bombers were ever assigned The allotment of units to the reserves was made only for planning purposes and mobilization plans called for personnel assigned to the squadron to be called to active duty during mobilization as individuals, not as a unit.

In 1948, Continental Air Command (ConAC) assumed responsibility for managing reserve and Air National Guard units from ADC. President Truman's reduced 1949 defense budget required reductions in the number of flying units in the Air Force, In May 1949, ConAC reorganized its operational reserve forces into 25 wings located at 23 reserve training centers, a reduction of 18 training centers. The new wings would be 20 troop carrier wings and 5 light bomber wings, since the National Guard was primarily a fighter force, and the Air Force did not have the resources to support medium or heavy bomber reserve units. With this reduction, the squadron was inactivated in June 1949.

=== Strategic Air Command ===
The squadron was activated at Altus Air Force Base, Oklahoma in November 1953, where it was assigned to the 96th Bombardment Wing. However, it was not manned until February 1955 and did not become operational until the middle of the following month, as it started equipping with Boeing B-47 Stratojets and began training in strategic bombardment in April. In January 1957, the squadron deployed to Andersen Air Force Base, Guam, remaining there until April. Not long after its return, the squadron, along with the other operational and maintenance elements of the 96th Wing moved to Dyess Air Force Base, Texas.

In October 1957 Strategic Air Command (SAC) began Operation Reflex. Reflex placed Stratojets and Boeing KC-97 Stratofreighters at bases closer to the Soviet Union for 90 day periods, although individuals rotated back to home bases during unit Reflex deployments. Although it did not deploy as a unit, the squadron provided crews and aircraft for Reflex operations. From 1958, SAC's Stratojet units began to assume an alert posture at their home bases, reducing the amount of time spent on alert at overseas bases. General Thomas S. Power set an initial goal of maintaining one third of SAC's planes on fifteen minute ground alert, fully fueled and ready for combat to reduce vulnerability to a Soviet missile strike. The SAC alert commitment was increased to half the squadron's aircraft in 1962.

During the 1962 Cuban Missile Crisis, the squadron moved its bombers to dispersal bases to reduce their vulnerability to a Soviet strike. Most dispersal bases were civilian airfields with reserve or Air National Guard units. On 24 October SAC went to DEFCON 2, placing all squadron aircraft on alert. Squadron aircraft were configured for execution of the Emergency War Order as soon as possible after dispersal. On 15 November 1/6 of the squadron's dispersed B-47s were recalled to their home base. On 21 November SAC went to DEFCON 3. The squadron's dispersed B-47s were recalled on 24 November. On 27 November SAC returned to normal alert posture. SAC was beginning to phase the B-47 out of its inventory, and the 339th was inactivated on 15 March 1963.

== Lineage ==
- Constituted as the 339th Bombardment Squadron (Heavy) on 28 January 1942

Activated on 15 July 1942
Redesignated 339th Bombardment Squadron, Heavy on c. 21 June 1943
Inactivated on 19 December 1945
Redesignated 339th Bombardment Squadron, Very Heavy on 13 May 1947
Activated in the reserve on 29 May 1947
Inactivated on 27 June 1949
Redesignated 339th Bombardment Squadron, Medium on 6 November 1953
Activated on 18 November 1953
Inactivated on 15 March 1963

=== Assignments ===
- 96th Bombardment Group, 15 July 1942 – 15 December 1945
- 96th Bombardment Group, 29 May 1947
- 384th Bombardment Group, 8 October 1947 – 27 June 1949
- 96th Bombardment Wing (later 96th Strategic Aerospace Wing), 18 November 1953 – 15 March 1963

=== Stations ===
- Salt Lake City Army Air Base, Utah, 15 July 1942
- Gowen Field, Idaho, 6 August 1942
- Walla Walla Army Air Base, Washington, 16 August 1942
- Rapid City Army Air Base, South Dakota, 29 September 1942
- Pocatello Army Airfield, Idaho, 1 November 1942
- Pyote Army Air Base, Texas, 4 January – 16 April 1943
- RAF Great Saling (AAF-485), England, 12 May 1943
- RAF Snetterton Heath (AAF-138), England, 12 June 1943 – 11 December 1945
- Camp Kilmer, New Jersey, 17–19 December 1945
- Jackson Army Air Base, Mississippi, 29 May 1947 – 27 June 1949
- Altus Air Force Base, Oklahoma, 18 November 1953 – 15 March 1963

=== Aircraft ===
- Boeing B-17 Flying Fortress, 1943–1945
- Boeing B-47 Stratojet, 1955–1963
