= RAF Andrews Field =

Air Force field in Essex, England 1942–1945

RAF Andrews Field RAF Great Saling USAAF Station 485
- Near Great Dunmow, Essex in England
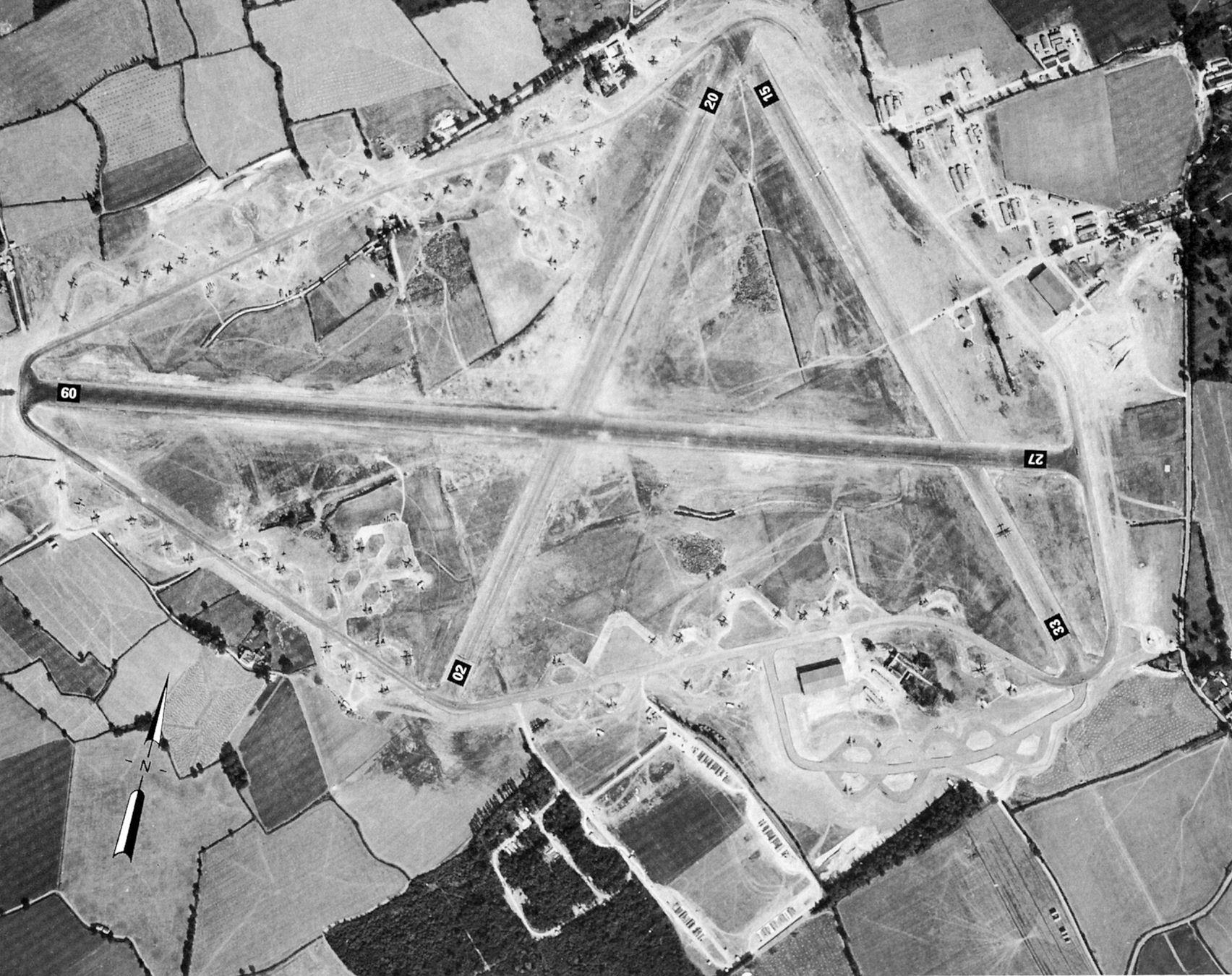
- Wartime photo of Andrews Field, taken on 4 September 1943. Numerous B-26 Marauders of the 322d Bomb Group are on the hardstands surrounding the airfield.

Site information
- Type: Royal Air Force station
- Code: GZ
- Owner: Air Ministry
- Operator: Royal Air Force 1944- United States Army Air Forces 1943-44
- Controlled by: Eighth Air Force (1943–1944); Ninth Air Force (1944); RAF Fighter Command (1944–1945) * No. 11 Group RAF

Location
- Shown within Essex RAF Andrews Field (the United Kingdom)
- Coordinates: 51°53′51″N 000°27′37″E

Site history
- Built: 1942-43
- Built by: US Pioneer Corps
- In use: July 1942 - November 1945
- Battles/wars: European theatre of World War II: Air Offensive, Europe; Normandy Campaign; Northern France Campaign

Airfield information
- Elevation: 290 feet (88 m) AMSL
Runways
Direction	Length and surface
02/20	1,280 metres (4,199 ft) Concrete/Tarmac
08/26	1,830 metres (6,004 ft) Concrete/Tarmac
14/32	1,280 metres (4,199 ft) Concrete/Tarmac

Royal Air Force Andrews Field or more simply RAF Andrews Field (also known as RAF Andrewsfield and RAF Great Saling) is a former Royal Air Force station located 4 miles (6.4 km) east-northeast of Great Dunmow Essex, England.

Originally designated as Great Saling when designed and under construction, the base was renamed "Andrews Field" in honour of United States Army Air Forces (USAAF) General Frank M. Andrews, who was killed in an aircraft crash in Iceland in May 1943. Andrews Field was primarily the home of the USAAF Ninth Air Force 322d Bombardment Group during the Second World War, which flew the Martin B-26 Marauder medium bomber. After being transferred to the Air Ministry in late 1944, it was used briefly by RAF Fighter Command for Gloster Meteor jet fighter testing before being finally closed in late 1945.

Today the remains of the airfield are located on private property, which is used for agricultural, with a small portion used by the Andrewsfield Flying Club.

== History ==
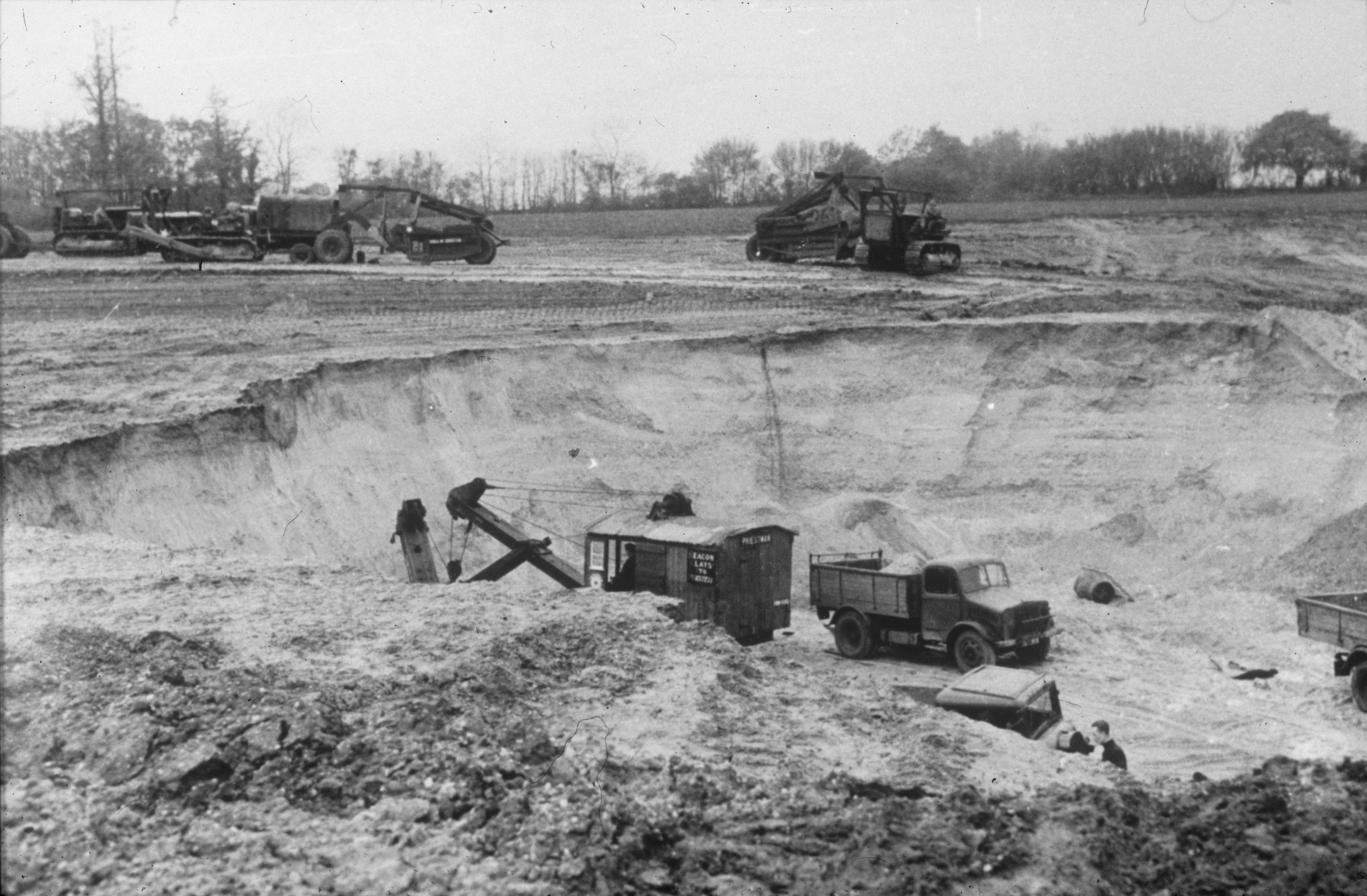
Photograph of construction of RAF Andrews Field by the 819th Engineer Battalion (Aviation) of the United States Army during 1942.

Andrews Field was the first of fourteen "Type A" airfields built by the United States Army Air Forces in the United Kingdom during the Second World War. Originally designated as "Great Saling", the facility was built by the United States Army 819th Engineer Battalion (Aviation), which began work on the field during July 1942.

Andrews Field had three runways, a main of 1,830m aligned 09/27 and two crosswind secondary runways of 1,280m aligned 02/20 and 15/33. It had an enclosing perimeter track that had three separate dispersal areas totaling 50 loop type hardstands and one "frying pan" type. Barracks facilities for about 3,000 personnel were constructed along with a technical site that had two T-2 type hangars for aircraft maintenance. Main construction was supposed to be completed in early January 1943, and it continued until March.

=== United States Army Air Forces use ===
On 21 May 1943 the official name was changed to Andrews Field in honour of Lieutenant General Frank M Andrews. Andrews Field was known as USAAF Station AAF-485 for security reasons by the USAAF during the war, by which name it was referred to instead of location. Its USAAF Station Code was "GZ". Although the name Andrews Field (or Andrewsfield) appears on RAF air maps and was widely used by that service, some USAAF agencies still referred to the airfield by the name Great Saling.

USAAF Station Units assigned to RAF Andrews Field were:

- 42d Service Group (VIII Air Force Composite Command)

356th, 361st Service Squadron, HHS, 42d Service Group

- 18th Station Complement Squadron
- 21st Weather Squadron
- 28th Mobile Reclamation and Repair Squadron

Regular Army Station Units included:

- 1020th Signal Company
- 1136th Quartermaster Company
- 1175th Military Police Company
- 1642nd Ordnance Supply & Maintenance Company
- 2253rd Quartermaster Truck Company
- 819th Chemical Company (Air Operations)
- 878th Signal Depot Company
- 2044th Engineer Fire Fighting Platoon
- 111th Army Postal Unit
- 201st Medical Dispensary
- Weather Detachment BB, 21st Weather Squadron

==== 96th Bombardment Group (Heavy) ====
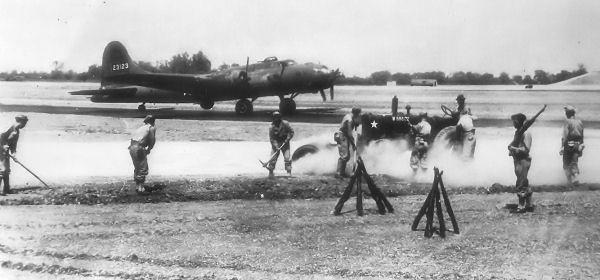
Douglas-Long Beach B-17F-25-DL Fortress Serial 42-3123 of the 96th Bomb Group at unfinished Andrews Field, 1943, Later transferred to the 381st Bomb Group at RAF Ridgewell, this aircraft crashed near Fladderlohhausen, 10-mile SE of Quakenbruck near Bremen Germany 8 October 1943. Ten crew KIA.

When opened in January 1943, Andrews Field was assigned to the VIII Bomber Command of Eighth Air Force, however it didn't receive its first combat group until May, when the 4th Bombardment Wing 96th Bombardment Group (Heavy) flying Boeing B-17 Flying Fortresses arrived from RAF Grafton Underwood (AAF-106) in Northamptonshire.

The group consisted of the following squadrons:

- 337th Bombardment Squadron (AX)
- 338th Bombardment Squadron (BX)
- 339th Bombardment Squadron (QJ)
- 413th Bombardment Squadron (MZ)

The 96th appears to have only carried out one mission while posted to Andrews Field. On 29 May 1943 they took part in a raid on Rennes naval storage depot from which one B-17 failed to return. The group was moved to RAF Snetterton Heath on 12 June 1943 in a general exchange of airfields with Martin B-26 Marauder 3d Bombardment Wing groups.

==== 322d Bombardment Group (Medium) ====
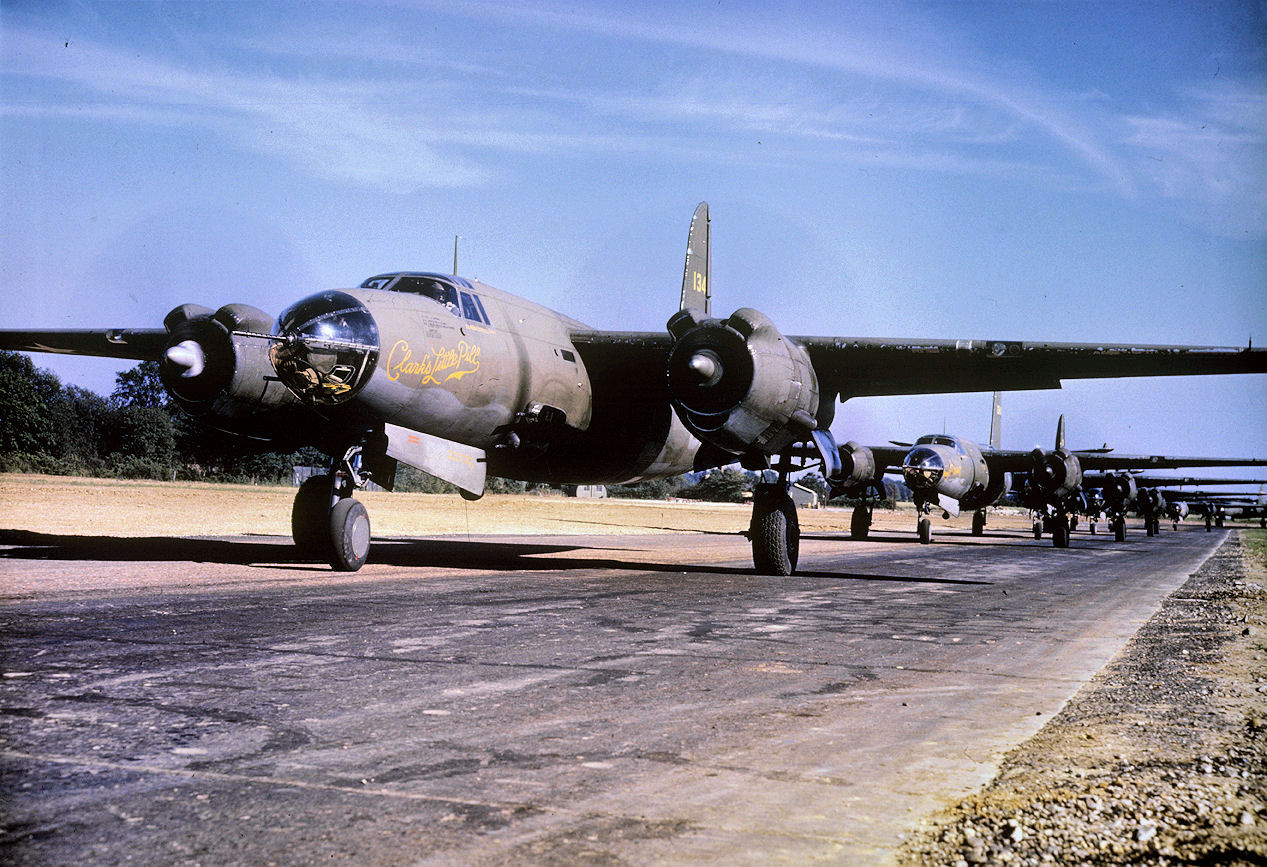
B-26 of the 322d Medium Bomb Group on the perimeter track prior to takeoff

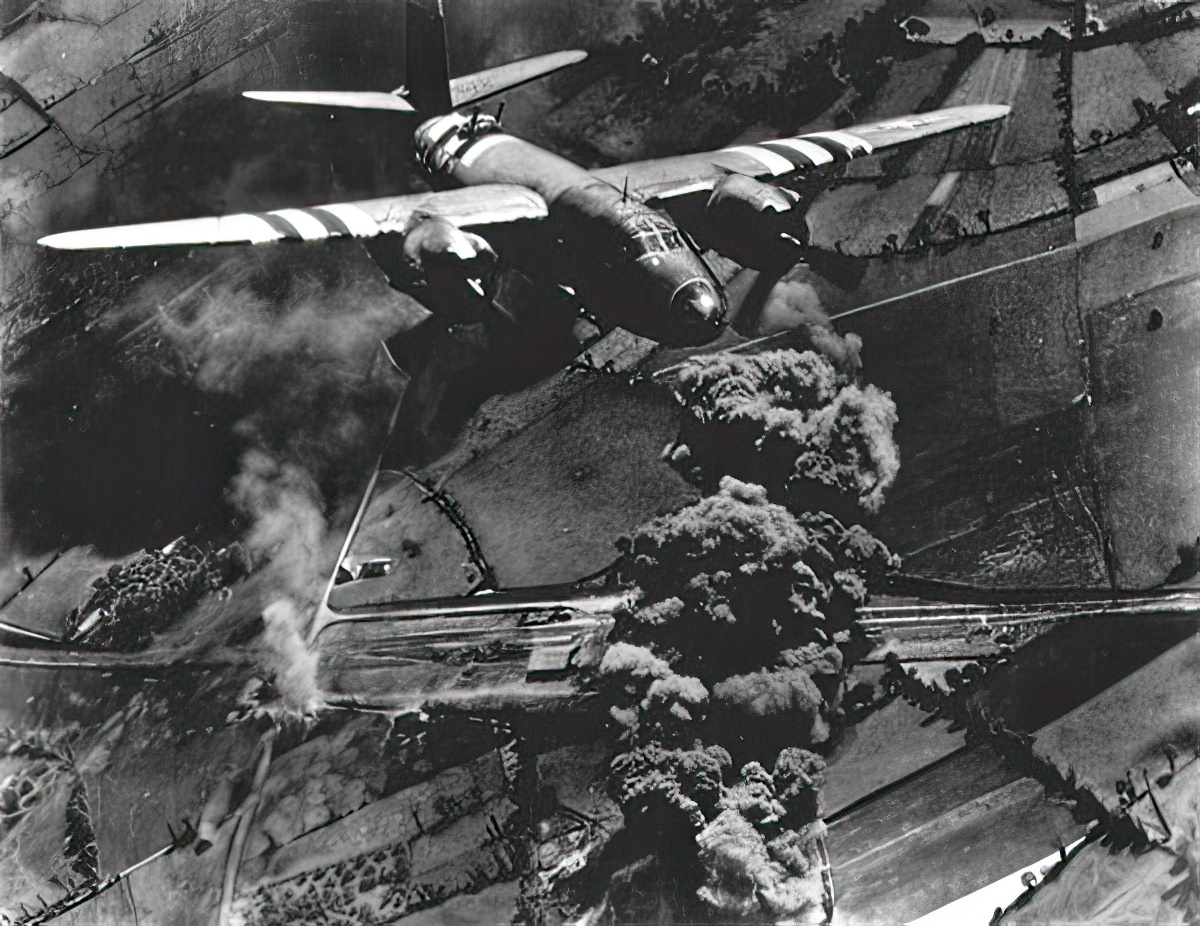
B-26 Marauder of the 322d Bomb Group on a mission over enemy-occupied territory, 1944.

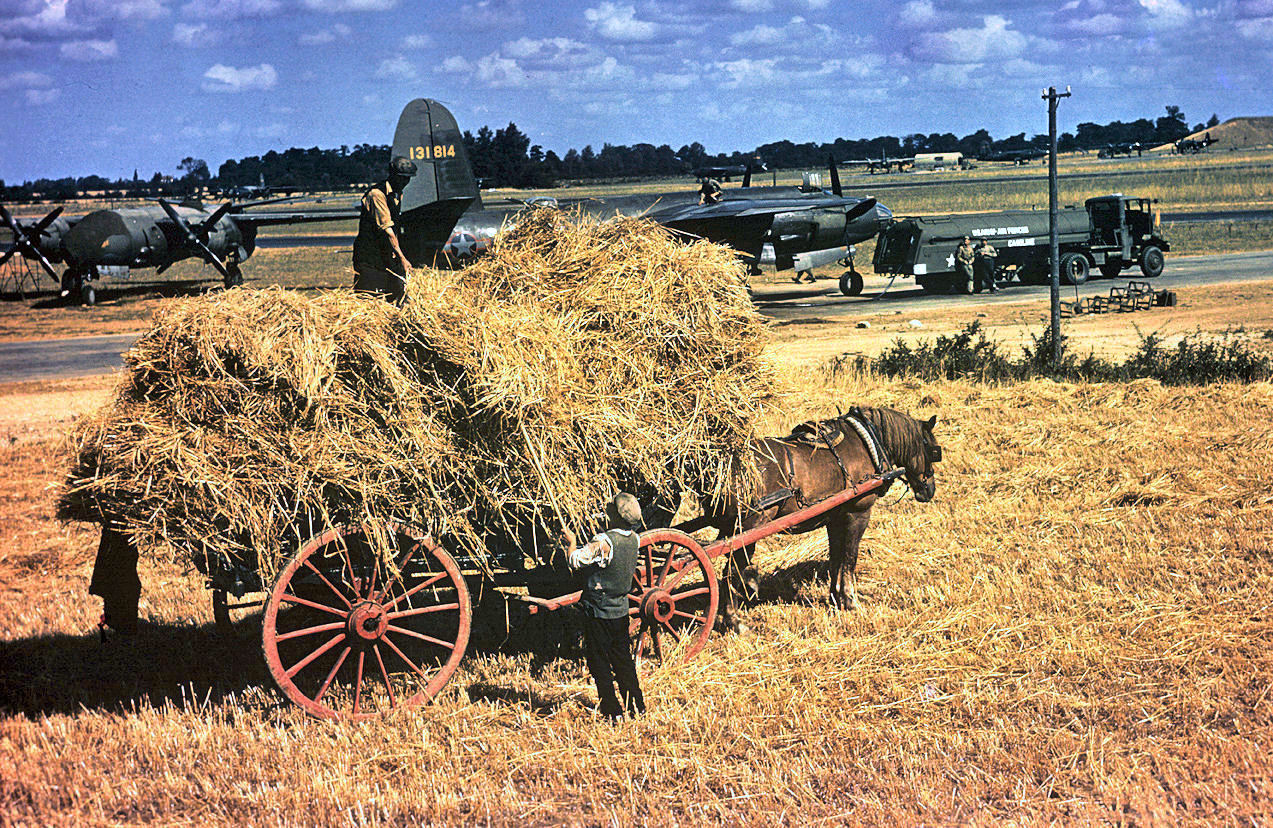
Farmers collect hay at Andrews Field whilst personnel of the 322nd Bomb Group work on a B-26 Marauder (serial number 41-31814) nicknamed "Bag Of Bolts".

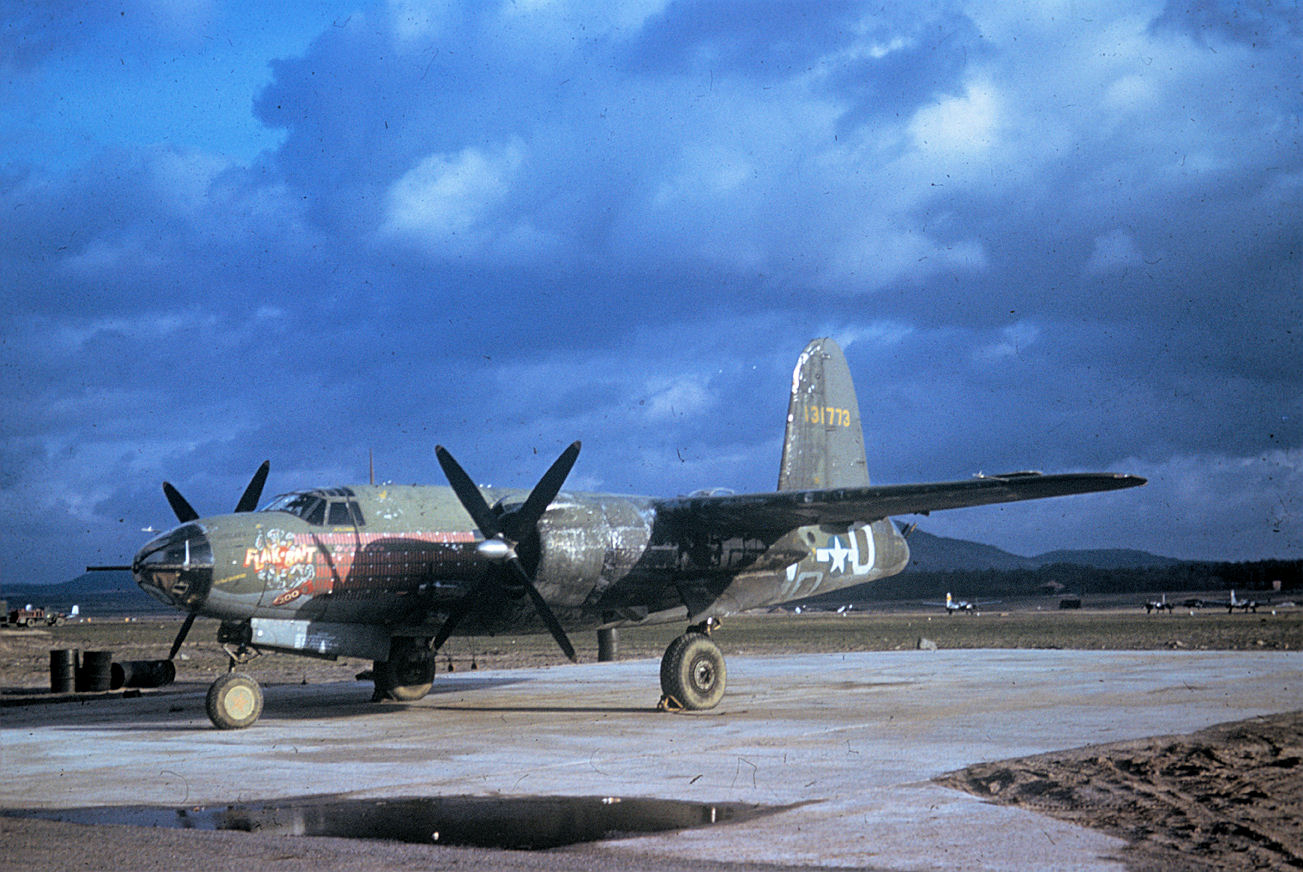
B-26 Marauder Flak-Bait at Andrews Field, 1944. This Marauder holds the record for the largest number of bombing missions survived during World War II.

Replacing the 96th was the 322d Bombardment Group (Medium) which arrived from RAF Bury St Edmunds on 12 June. The group was assigned to the 3d Bomb Wing and flew Martin B-26B/C Marauders. Operational squadrons of the 322d were:

- 449th Bombardment Squadron (PN)
- 450th Bombardment Squadron (ER)
- 451st Bombardment Squadron (SS)
- 452d Bombardment Squadron (DR)
- 1st Pathfinder Squadron (Provisional) (Attached) (1H)

The 322nd was the first B-26 group to enter combat (in May 1943) from the UK, during which its combat performance helped to prove the effectiveness of the medium bombers flying tactical combat missions.

In common with other Marauder units of the 3rd Bomb Wing, the 322d was transferred to Ninth Air Force on 16 October 1943. The group attacked enemy airfields in France, Belgium, and the Netherlands attacking the principal targets but the group also attacked secondary targets such as power stations, shipyards, construction works, and marshalling yards.

Beginning in March 1944 the 322nd bombed railway and highway bridges, oil tanks, and missile sites in preparation for the invasion of Normandy.

On 8 May 1944, one of the 322nd aircraft, nicknamed "Mild and Bitter" (serial 41-31819) became the first B-26 flying from England to complete 100 combat missions. Another B-26, "Flak Bait" (41-31773) survived to the end of hostilities with 202 missions to its credit, the only US bomber involved in combat over Europe to pass the 200 mark.

On D-Day, 6 June 1944 the 322d Bomb Group attacked coastal defences and gun batteries. Afterwards, during the Normandy campaign, the 322nd pounded fuel and ammunition dumps, bridges, and road junctions, supporting the Allied offensive at Caen and the breakthrough at Saint-Lô in July.

From Andrews Field the 322d received a Distinguished Unit Citation for the period 14 May 1943 – 24 July 1944. The group moved during September 1944, transferring to Beauvais (A-61) Airfield in northern France, and aiding the drive of Third Army across France. On the continent, the 322nd BG used the following Advanced Landing Grounds:

- Beauvais/Tille Airfield (A-61), France September 1944
- Le Culot Airfield (A-89), Belgium March 1945
- Fritzlar Airfield (Y-86), Germany June - November 1945

The 322d flew its last mission on 24 April 1945. After V-E Day, the group was assigned to occupation duty in Germany beginning in June 1945, engaging in inventorying and disassembling German Air Force equipment and facilities. Returned to the Camp Kilmer, New Jersey in December 1945, and was inactivated on 15 December.

1st Pathfinder Squadron (Provisional)

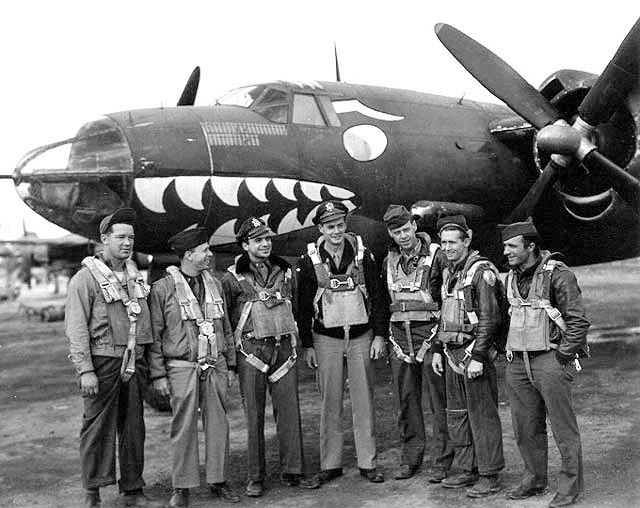
B-26 crew photo from the 1st Pathfinder Squadron (Provisional)

The 1st Pathfinder Squadron (Provisional) was formed at Andrews Field in February 1944 and equipped with B-26s, carrying the Oboe radio transponder blind-bombing device. When the unit was formed the squadron consisted of 14 aircraft. The squadron was attached to the 322nd Bombardment Group, but provided bad weather leads for all IX Ninth Bombing Command groups.

The first B-26 night mission was flown by the 1st Pathfinder Squadron on the night of 1 June 1944 when three B-26's bombed gun positions at St Marie au Bois, France. This was purely a Pathfinder mission and no other unit participated. On the night of 8 July 1944, using Oboe, the 322d undertook a night mission but nine of its aircraft fell victim to Luftwaffe fighters. At the end of hostilities the squadron strength was 36 B-26's.

=== RAF Fighter Command use ===
Unlike most of the airfields vacated by the Ninth Air Force in the area, Andrews Field was immediately returned to RAF Fighter Command control on 7 October - to provide an airfield for North American Mustang squadrons escorting Bomber Command daylight operations being used by 11 Group, Air Defence of Great Britain (ADGB). At this time the airfield was also under consideration for extension of runways to house Very Heavy Boeing B-29 Superfortress bombers.

Within a week the HQ of No. 150 (Polish) Wing RAF and an advance party of No. 19 Squadron moved in. By the middle of October 1944, Nos. 19, 65 and 122 Squadrons (No. 122 Wing) had joined the Polish Wing consisting of Nos. 129, 306 and 315 Squadrons.

At the end of February 1945 the Gloster Meteor III jet fighters of 616 Squadron arrived, they stayed for a month before being replaced by a detachment of Meteor IIIs from 504 Squadron.

In addition to the combat squadrons, the Air Sea Rescue Supermarine Walruses of 276 Squadron, RAF Coastal Command were resident from early June 1945. They left for Kjevik, Norway on 23 August.

With the end of the war, No 303 Squadron departed in December 1945 and the airfield was placed under care and maintenance and became a satellite of RAF Great Sampford in 1946.

== Current use ==
With the end of military control, Andrews Field was virtually abandoned by 1948 and soon took on an air of neglect. In common with other disused airfields, some of the buildings were taken over as temporary housing, even as late as 1953. From there on, virtually all the buildings with the exception of the two T-2 hangars and most of the ground works (runways, etc.) were removed and the land reverted to agriculture.

In 1972, aircraft again returned to Andrews Field (renamed Andrewsfield Aerodrome) when a 915m grass strip along part of the line of the original main runway was constructed. As flying increased, a clubhouse and flying control were erected in 1975 for the Andrewsfield Flying Club. The airfield was licensed by the CAA in 1976.

The Rebel Air Museum was housed in a blister hangar near the clubhouse for some time, until it moved to new premises on Earls Colne airfield.

Other than the two T2 hangars, the firing-in butts and a few Nissen huts in the dispersed sites, little remains of the once-busy wartime airfield. Only a small amount of single track perimeter remains along the south side of the airfield, although the wartime runways are visible as disturbed earth in aerial photography. There are two memorials, one in the village is positioned in front of the former Sick Quarters Site and commemorates the 819th Aviation Engineer Battalion who built the airfield. The other memorial is along the lane from the A120 to Great Saling and is to the memory of the 322nd Bomb Group (M). A mural depicting a B-26 adorns an interior wall of the Andrewsfield Flying Club clubhouse. Also on display are a number of photographs showing the airfield under construction.

Andrewsfield is also a source for BBC Weather readings for the local area quoted on their website.

== Units assigned ==
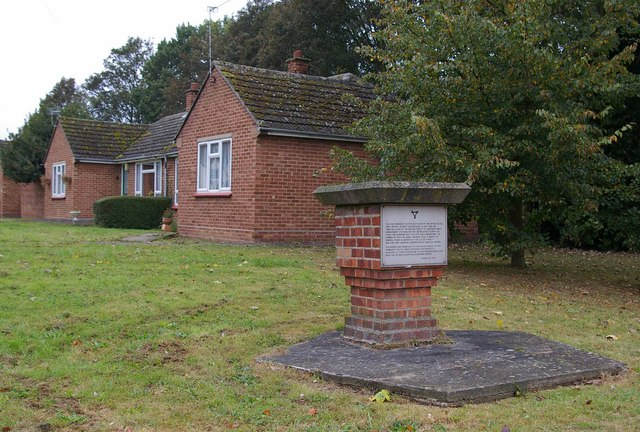
US memorial to those who served at Andrews Field airfield in WW2. It is on the green in Vicarage Close, Great Saling.

Royal Air Force

- HQ, No. 133 Wing RAF (10–24 October 1944)
- No. 129 (Mysore) Squadron RAF (10 October - 12 December 1944)
- 306 Squadron (10 October 1944 – 10 August 1945)
- No. 315 Polish Fighter Squadron (10–24 October 1944, 15 January - 8 August 1945)
- No. 19 Squadron RAF (14 October 1944 – 13 February 1945)
- No. 65 (East India) Squadron RAF (14 October 1944 – 16 January 1945, 6–15 May 1945)
- 122 Squadron (14 October 1944 – 1 May 1945)
- HQ, No. 150 Wing RAF (15 October - 23 December 1944)
- 316 Squadron (24 October 1944 – 16 May 1945, 10 August - 17 September 1945, 5 October - 28 November 1945)
- 309 Squadron (12 December 1944 – 10 August 1945)
- 616 Squadron (28 February – 31 March 1945)
- No. 303 Squadron RAF (Polish) (4 April – 16 May 1945, 9 August - 28 November 1945)
- 276 Squadron (8 June - 23 August 1945)
- No. 2766 Squadron RAF Regiment
- No. 2769 Squadron RAF Regiment
- No. 1 Aircraft Delivery Flight RAF

United States Army Air Forces

- 96th Bombardment Group, (13 May - 11 June 1943)
- 332nd Bombardment Group, (12 June 1943 – 25 September 1944)

== See also ==
- List of former Royal Air Force stations
- Frank Maxwell Andrews
