= Andrewsfield Aerodrome =

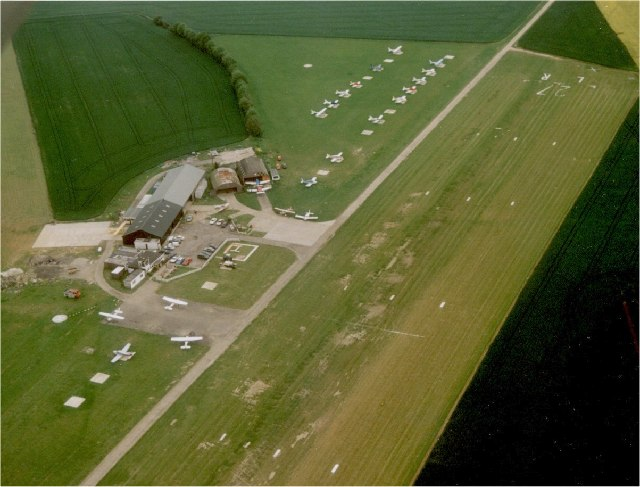
- Aerial image, 1991

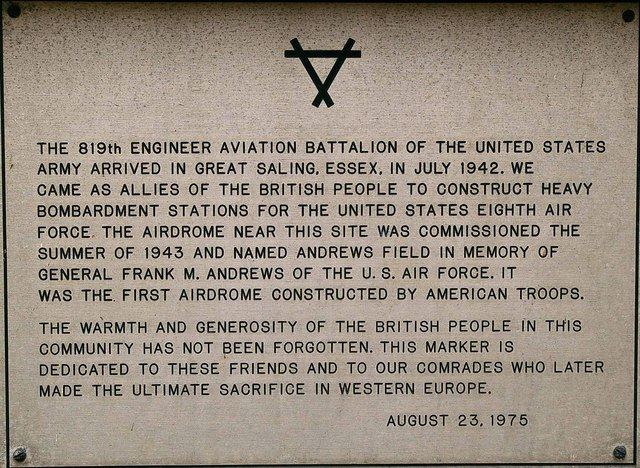
- USAAF memorial plaque
- IATA: none; ICAO: EGSL

Summary
- Airport type: Private-owned, Public-use
- Operator: Andrewsfield Aviation Ltd.
- Serves: Braintree, Essex
- Elevation AMSL: 286 ft / 87 m
- Coordinates: 51°53′42″N 000°26′57″E

Map
- Location in Essex

Runways
Direction	Length		Surface
Direction	m	ft	Surface
09L/27R	799	2,621	Grass
09R/27L	799	2,621	Grass
- Sources: UK AIP at NATS

Andrewsfield Aerodrome (ICAO: EGSL) is an operational general aviation aerodrome located 4.5 miles (7.2 km) west-northwest of Braintree, Essex, England, formerly RAF Andrews Field. Andrewsfield also functions as an important reliever airport for Stansted airport.

Andrewsfield has a CAA Ordinary Licence (Number P789) that allows flights for the public transport of passengers or for flying instruction as authorised by the licensee (Andrewsfield Air Operations Limited).

Both the grass runways are 18 m (59 ft) wide and at night serve as a single 36 m (118 ft) runway. It has one orange windsock.

== See also ==
- RAF Andrews Field the original World War II base

== See also ==
- Airports of London - Wikipedia
