= United States Air Force Seek Eagle Office =

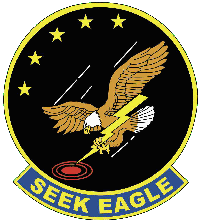
AFSEO Insignia

The United States Air Force SEEK EAGLE Office (USAF SEEK EAGLE Office, AFSEO) was started to improve the combat capability of the warfighter. The SEEK EAGLE Program, which is the standard for the aircraft-stores certification process of the United States Air Force (USAF), was created for this purpose. This program certifies all weapons (conventional and nuclear), suspension equipment, tanks, and pods carried externally or internally. The process includes safe upload and download procedures; flight limits for safe carriage, employment, jettison, safe escape, and ballistic accuracy verification. The SEEK EAGLE process includes the integrated use of digital modeling, simulation, and analysis; ground tests; and flight tests to obtain/generate the data needed to verify aircraft-store compatibility and maintain the accuracy of/support updates to the operational flight programs (OFPs) and technical orders (TOs).

== Mission ==
Ensure new warfighter capabilities through the application and transfer of aircraft-store compatibility expertise.

== History ==
The Air Force SEEK EAGLE Office (AFSEO) is a named Air Force unit and, by special order, the single point of expertise for aircraft-store compatibility.

In the early stages of air warfare, aircraft-store compatibility was not a significant consideration except to ensure that weapons would fit onto and function with a carrier aircraft. During the Vietnam War, aircraft entered the inventory that were large and powerful enough to carry significant tonnage of weapons. Also, many new weapons were being developed. The management of the resulting marriage of the aircraft and weapons provided a bewildering matrix of combinations that had to be identified, prioritized, analyzed and certified in a timely manner.

At the end of the war, the McDonnell Douglas F-4 Phantom was the USAF mainstay tactical combat aircraft. Virtually every store in existence was certified for use on the F-4. In the late 1970s, the USAF decided to replace the F-4 with the General Dynamics F-16 Fighting Falcon. The F-16 exhibited many more incompatibilities with weapons than the F-4 did. As the F-4 was phased out, the F-16 combat users found they were not getting the quantity and quality of combat capability they were expecting. Their mounting frustration culminated in 1986 when the Commander of the Tactical Air Command challenged HQ USAF to fix the problem. HQ USAF directed the SEEK EAGLE revitalization study. That study resulted in the establishment of the AFSEO in December 1987, when the office was chartered by the Secretary of the Air Force.
