= 337th Test and Evaluation Squadron =

337th Test and Evaluation Squadron

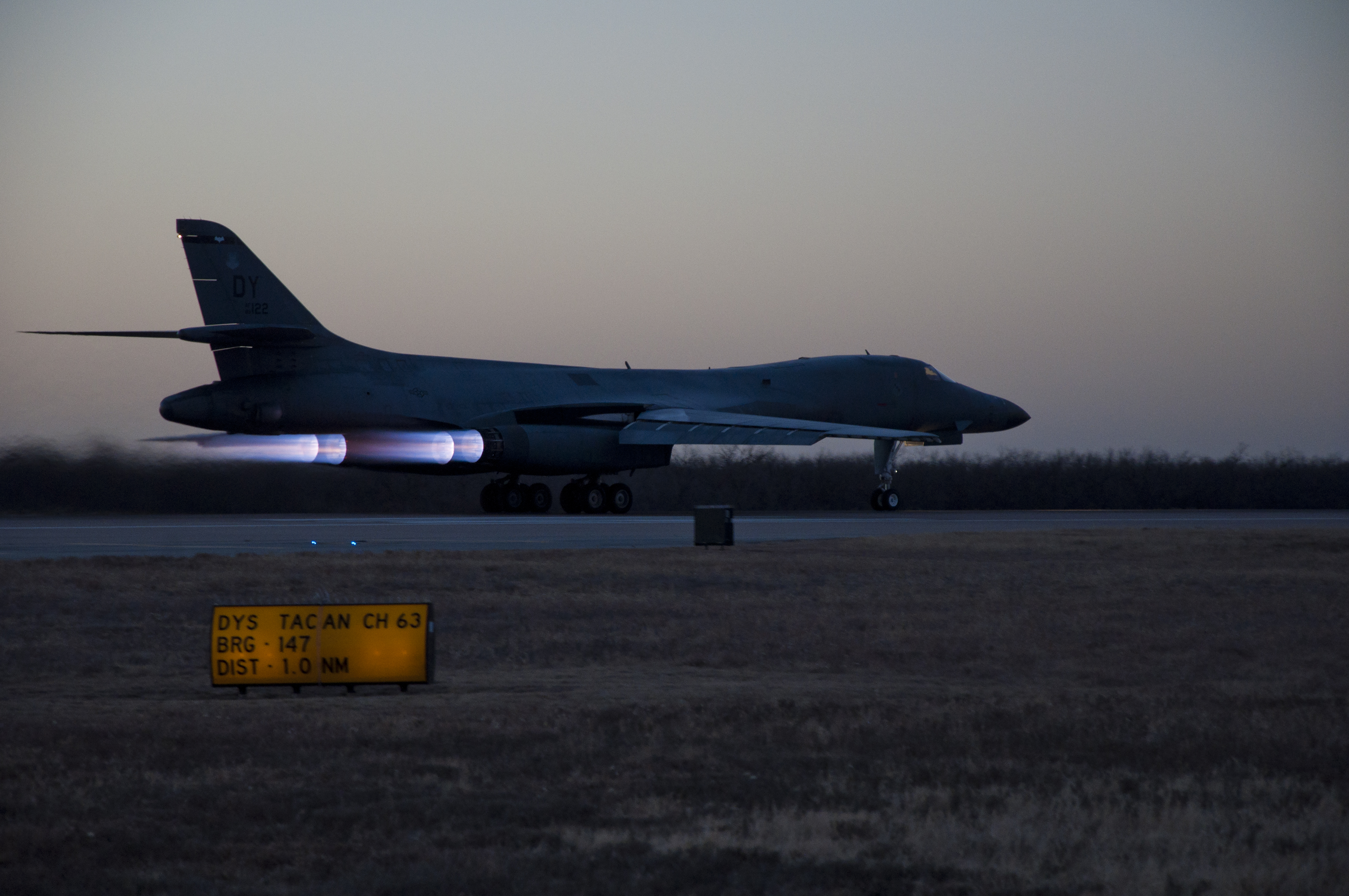
- Upgraded B-1 Lancer undergoing operational testing by the squadron
- Active: 1942–1945; 1947–1949; 1953–1963; 1963–1994; 2004–present
- Country: United States
- Branch: United States Air Force
- Role: Operational Testing
- Part of: Air Combat Command
- Garrison/HQ: Dyess Air Force Base, Texas
- Engagements: European Theater of Operations
- Decorations: Distinguished Unit Citation; Air Force Outstanding Unit Award

Insignia
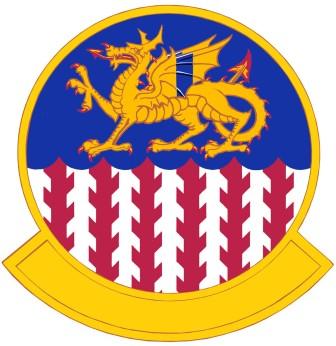
- 337th Test and Evaluation Squadron emblem (Note: Approved 29 August 1967.)

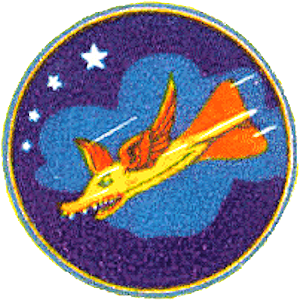
- 337th Bombardment Squadron emblem (Note: Approved 5 May 1943. Description: On a disc dark blue, within a border light blue, piped orange, a golden aerial bomb, trimmed orange, winged red, having a nose in shape of a shark's head, falling to dexter base and emitting speed lines white, in front of a light blue cloud formation; in dexter chief four white stars of diminishing sizes.)

Aircraft flown
- Bomber: Rockwell B-1 Lancer

The 337th Test and Evaluation Squadron is a squadron of the United States Air Force. It is a part of the 753d Test and Evaluation Group of the 53d Wing. The 337th is stationed at Dyess Air Force Base, Texas.

The squadron was first activated during World War II as the 337th Bombardment Squadron. It served in the European Theater of Operations, where it participated in the strategic bombing campaign against Germany and earned two Distinguished Unit Citations for its combat actions. Following V-E Day, the squadron returned to the United States and was inactivated.

This squadron was again active from 1947 to 1949 in the reserves, although it was apparently never fully manned or equipped. It was active as a Boeing B-47 Stratojet squadron in Strategic Air Command from 1953 to 1963. It later flew the Boeing B-52 Stratofortress and the Lancer before transferring its assets to another squadron in 1994.

== Mission ==
The squadron's primary task is to test and evaluate modifications on the Rockwell B-1 Lancer, as well as to train aircrews to fly upgraded B-1s.

== History ==
=== World War II ===
==== Initial organization and training ====
The first predecessor of the squadron was activated at Salt Lake City Army Air Base in July 1942 as the 337th Bombardment Squadron, one of the original squadrons of the 96th Bombardment Group. In early August the squadron moved to Gowen Field, Idaho, where it received its initial cadre, then, later that month to Walla Walla Army Air Base, Washington to begin training with the Boeing B-17 Flying Fortress. On 1 November, the squadron moved to Pocatello Army Air Field, Idaho, where it began to act as a Operational Training Unit. It moved to Pyote Army Air Base, Texas in January 1943 and resumed training for overseas movement.

The air echelon of the squadron began ferrying their B-17s via the North Atlantic ferry route, stopping at Presque Isle Army Air Field, Newfoundland, Iceland, then at Prestwick Airport, Scotland on 4 April 1943. The ground echelon left Pyote on 16 April for Camp Kilmer, New Jersey in the New York Port of Embarkation, sailing on the RMS Queen Elizabeth on 5 May and arriving in Scotland on 13 May.

==== Combat in the European Theater ====
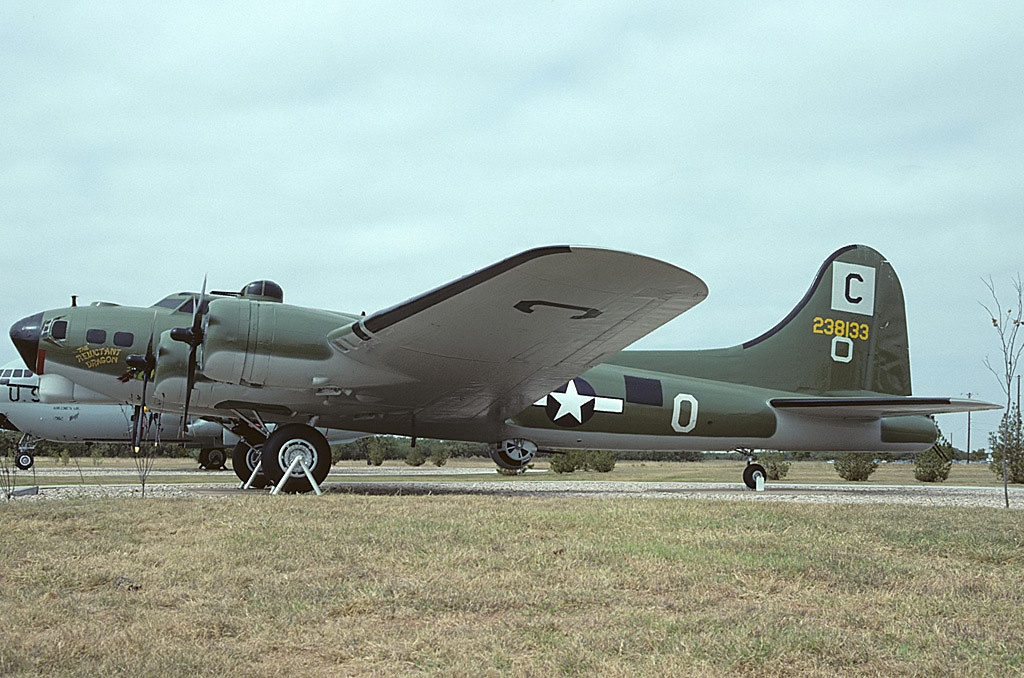
Display aircraft marked as squadron B-17G Reluctant Dragon (Note: Aircraft is Lockheed Vega built Boeing B-17G-95-VE Flying Fortress, serial 44-85599. This aircraft served with a training unit in the United States. Baugher, Joe (4 March 2023). "1944 USAF Serial Numbers". Joe Baugher. Seen here on display at the Linear Air Park at Dyess Air Force Base in the markings of Douglas Aircraft built Boeing B-17G-30-DL Flying Fortress, serial 42-38133, Reluctant Dragon, which was shot down on 30 November 1944 on a mission to Berlin. Baugher, Joe (25 December 2022). "1942 USAF Serial Numbers". Joe Baugher..)

The squadron was established at RAF Great Saling by 12 May, and flew its first combat mission the next day, an attack against the airfield at Saint-Omer, France. However, the squadron was late assembling and did not complete the mission. The following day, it made its first strike on a target, an airfield at Courtrai. (Note: After action reports described the bombing as "ineffective." However, later intelligence found that damage to the facilities was severe enough to force III/Jagdgeschwader 26 to move from the field. Freeman (1970), p. 47.) Eighth Air Force decided to transfer its new Martin B-26 Marauder units from VIII Bomber Command to VIII Air Support Command and concentrate them on bases closer to the European continent. As a result, the 322d Bombardment Group moved to Great Saling on 12 June, forcing the 96th Group and its squadrons to relocate to RAF Snetterton Heath, which would be its combat station for the rest of the war.

The squadron bombed Germany as part of the strategic air campaign. It attacked airdromes, aircraft factories, harbors, oil refineries, railway yards, shipyards, and other industrial targets in Germany, France, the Netherlands, Belgium, Norway, Poland, Hungary, and Czechoslovakia. Targets included airfields at Bordeaux and Augsburg; marshalling yards at Kiel, Hamm, Braunschweig, and Gdynia; aircraft factories at Chemnitz, Hanover, and Diósgyőr; oil refineries at Merseburg and Most, and chemical works in Wiesbaden, Ludwigshafen, and Neunkirchen

During an attack on the Messerschmitt factory at Regensberg on 17 August 1943, the squadron was without escort after its escorting Republic P-47 Thunderbolts reached the limit of their range. It withstood repeated attacks, first by enemy Messerschmitt Bf 109 and Focke-Wulf Fw 190 interceptors, then by Messerschmitt Bf 110 and Junkers Ju 88 night fighters, to strike its target, earning its first Distinguished Unit Citation (DUC). This was a "shuttle" mission, with the squadron recovering on bases in North Africa, rather than returning to England.

The squadron formed part of the leading 45th Combat Bombardment Wing formation on very long-range mission against the Focke-Wulf Fw 190 factory at Poznań. Heavy clouds led an entire wing and some combat boxes of the 45th Wing to abandon the mission and return to England. The 96th Group and one other combat box proceeded to the target and were surprised to find they were able to bomb visually, although the target was defended by intense flak fire, earning the squadron its second DUC.

In addition to strategic operations, the squadron participated in air support and interdiction missions. In the preparation for Operation Overlord, the invasion of Normandy, it bombed coastal defenses, railway bridges, gun emplacements, and field batteries in the battle area prior to and during D-Day in June 1944. It attacked enemy positions in support of Operation Cobra the breakout at Saint Lo in July 1944, aiding the campaign in France in August by striking roads and road junctions, and by dropping supplies to the Maquis. During the early months of 1945, it attacked the communications supplying German armies on the western front.

After V-E Day, the 337th flew food missions to the Netherlands and hauled redeployed personnel to French Morocco, Ireland, France, and Germany. The squadron was scheduled for occupation duty, but that plan was cancelled in September 1945. In November 1945 its aircraft were flown back to the United States or transferred to other units in Europe. The unit's remaining personnel returned to the United States and it was inactivated at the Port of Embarkation on 29 November 1945.

=== Reserve operations ===
The squadron was activated in the reserves under Air Defense Command (ADC) at Gunter Field, Alabama on 29 May 1947, and was again assigned to the 96th Group, nominally as a heavy bomber unit. As the post war Air Force took shape, the National Guard was considered the first line of reserve. Reserve units like the 337th got what was left over after National Guard units received facilities, equipment and aircraft. Aircraft were allotted to reserve units as a means of maintaining flying proficiency, not combat readiness and were overwhelmingly trainers, and no heavy bombers were ever assigned The allotment of units to the reserves was made only for planning purposes and mobilization plans called for personnel assigned to the squadron to be called to active duty during mobilization as individuals, not as a unit.

In 1948, Continental Air Command (ConAC) assumed responsibility for managing reserve and National Guard units from ADC. In May 1949, ConAC reorganized its operational reserve forces into 25 wings located at 23 reserve training centers, a reduction of 18 training centers. The new wings would be 20 troop carrier wings and 5 light bomber wings, since the National Guard was primarily a fighter force, and the Air Force did not have the resources to support medium or heavy bomber reserve units. With this reduction, the squadron was inactivated in June 1949.

=== Strategic Air Command ===
==== B-47 Operations ====
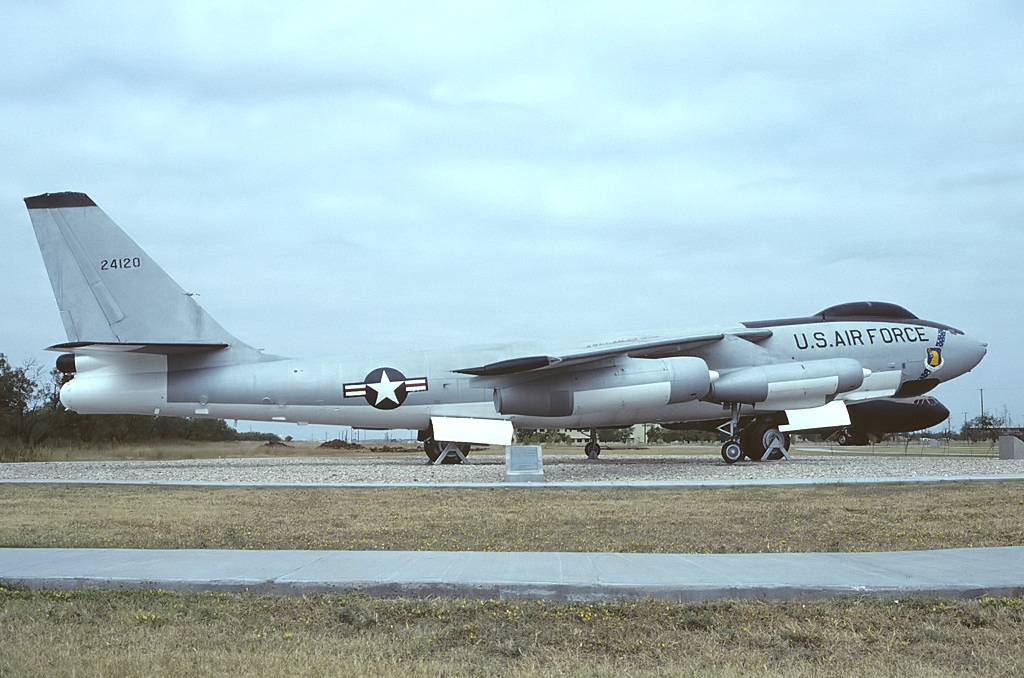
A B-47on display at Dyess AFB in 96th Wing markings

The squadron was activated at Altus Air Force Base, Oklahoma in November 1953, where it was assigned to the 96th Bombardment Wing. However, it was not manned until February 1955 and did not become operational until the middle of the following month, as it started equipping with Boeing B-47 Stratojets and began training in strategic bombardment in April. In January 1957, the squadron deployed to Andersen Air Force Base, Guam, remaining there until April. Not long after its return, the squadron, along with the other operational and maintenance elements of the 96th Wing moved to Dyess Air Force Base, Texas.

In October 1957 Strategic Air Command (SAC) began Operation Reflex. Reflex placed Stratojets and Boeing KC-97 Stratofreighters at bases closer to the Soviet Union for 90 day periods, although individuals rotated back to home bases during unit Reflex deployments. Although it did not deploy as a unit, the squadron provided crews and aircraft for Reflex operations. From 1958, SAC's Stratojet units began to assume an alert posture at their home bases, reducing the amount of time spent on alert at overseas bases. General Thomas S. Power set an initial goal of maintaining one third of SAC's planes on fifteen minute ground alert, fully fueled and ready for combat to reduce vulnerability to a Soviet missile strike. The SAC alert commitment was increased to half the squadron's aircraft in 1962.

During the 1962 Cuban Missile Crisis, the squadron moved its bombers to dispersal bases to reduce their vulnerability to a Soviet strike. Most dispersal bases were civilian airfields with reserve or Air National Guard units. On 24 October SAC went to DEFCON 2, placing all aircraft on alert. Squadron aircraft were configured for execution of the Emergency War Order as soon as possible after dispersal. On 15 November 1/6 of the squadron's dispersed B-47s were recalled to their home base. On 21 November SAC went to DEFCON 3. The squadron's dispersed B-47s were recalled on 24 November. On 27 November SAC returned to normal alert posture. SAC was beginning to phase the B-47 out of its inventory, and the 337th was inactivated on 15 March 1963.

==== B-52 operations ====
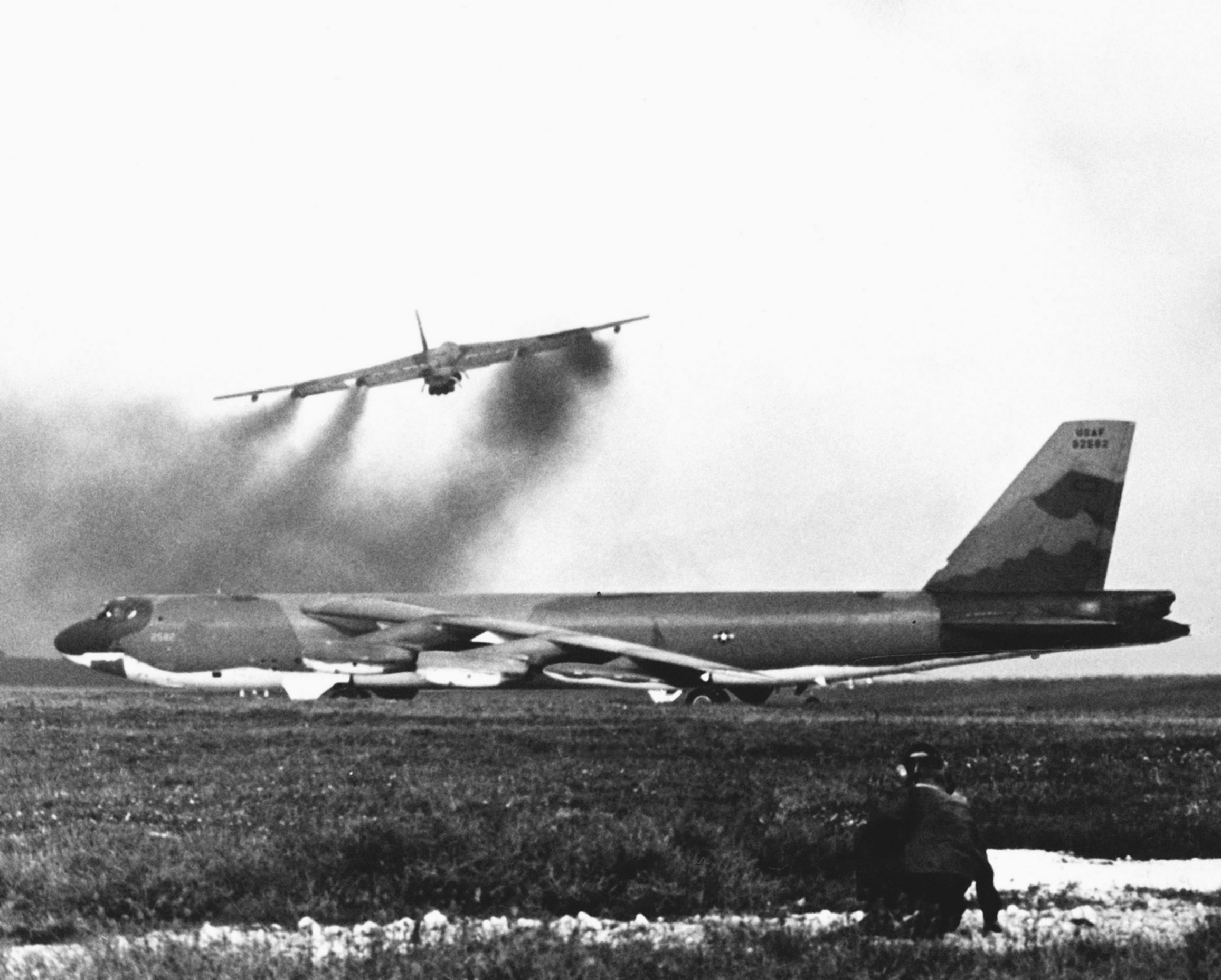
B-52s deployed to Andersen AFB

The squadron did not remain on the inactive list very long, for it activated again at Dyess, organizing as a Boeing B-52 Stratofortress unit on 15 September 1963, although it was nonoperational until late December. In addition to the ground alert program that it resumed, the squadron periodically participated in Operation Chrome Dome, "airborne alert training."

Beginning in 1968, squadron aircraft and crews deployed to Southeast Asia for bombardment operations. Although it did not deploy as a unit, the squadron furnished aircraft and crews to Strategic Air Command organizations based in the Pacific participating in Operation Arc Light and Operation Linebacker. From 27 June to 19 September 1970 and from 8 April 1972 to 28 October 1973 all personnel and aircraft of the squadron were deployed and the squadron was not operational as a unit.

During the Cuban Missile Crisis, SAC had successfully dispersed its B-47 force and even earlier, and earlier had dispersed its B-52 force. Both these programs dispersed bombers in squadron strength or larger. In 1969, SAC began a "satellite" program in which smaller numbers of bombers and tankers were placed on alert away from their home stations. The squadron continued to fly the B-52 until 1984

==== B-1 operations ====
When the Air Force switched to the Rockwell B-1 Lancer in 1985, the 337th was the first unit to fly the new bomber, with its first plane christened the Star of Abeline. The new bombers began standing nuclear alert in 1986, but from late 1990 to February 1991 were grounded due to engine problems. On 28 September 1991, along with all SAC missiles and bombers, the squadron's B-1s were taken off alert. That same month SAC reorganized under the Objective Wing Concept and the squadron was assigned to the 96th Operations Group. When SAC was doisestablished in June 1992, the squadron became part of Air Combat Command.

On 1 October 1994, the squadron was inactivated and transferred its personnel, mission and equipment to the 28th Bomb Squadron, which was simultaneously activated.

=== Test and evaluation ===
The squadron was designated the 337th Test and Evaluation Squadron and activated at Dyess in May 2004. It was initially assigned to the 53d Test and Evaluation Group, located at Nellis Air Force Base, Nevada. In May 2021, it was reassigned to the 753rd Test and Evaluation Group at Eglin Air Force Base, Florida.

The 337th conducts testing of various upgrades to the B-1, as well as trains aircrews to operate and maintain the upgraded aircraft. The squadron has been currently working on the increasing the B-1's weapons payload, attempting to increase the bomber's ability to deliver weapons into heavily defended areas.

== Lineage ==
- Constituted as the 337th Bombardment Squadron (Heavy) on 28 January 1942

Activated on 15 July 1942
Redesignated 337th Bombardment Squadron, Heavy on 22 June 1943
Inactivated on 29 November 1945
Redesignated 337th Bombardment Squadron, Very Heavy on 13 May 1947
Activated in the reserve on 29 May 1947
Inactivated 27 June 1949
Redesignated 337th Bombardment Squadron, Medium on 6 November 1953
Activated 18 November 1953
Discontinued and inactivated on 15 March 1963
Redesignated 337th Bombardment Squadron, Heavy
Activated on 20 March 1963 (not organized)
Organized on 15 September 1963
Redesignated 337th Bomb Squadron on 1 September 1991
Inactivated on 1 October 1994
Redesignated 337th Test and Evaluation Squadron on 8 April 2004
Activated on 14 May 2004

=== Assignments ===
- 96th Bombardment Group, 15 July 1942 – 29 November 1945
- 96th Bombardment Group, 29 May 1947 – 27 June 1949
- 96th Bombardment Wing (later 96th Strategic Aerospace Wing), 18 November 1953 – 15 Mar 1963
- Strategic Air Command, 20 Mar 1963 (not organized)
- 96th Strategic Aerospace Wing (later 96th Bombardment Wing), 15 September 1963
- 96th Operations Group, 1 September 1991
- 7th Operations Group, 1 October 1993 – 1 October 1994
- 53rd Test and Evaluation Group, 14 May 2004
- 753rd Test and Evaluation Group, 1 May 2021 – present

=== Stations ===
- Salt Lake City Army Air Base, Utah, 15 July 1942
- Gowen Field, Idaho, 6 August 1942
- Walla Walla Army Air Base, Washington, 31 August 1942
- Rapid City Army Air Base, South Dakota, 29 September 1942
- Pocatello Army Air Field, Idaho, 3 November 1942
- Pyote Army Air Base, Texas, 7 January - 15 April 1943
- RAF Great Saling (AAF-485), England, 13 May 1943
- RAF Snetterton Heath (AAF-138), England, 29 May 1943 - 22 November 1945
- Camp Kilmer, New Jersey, 27–29 November 1945
- Gunter Field (later Gunter Air Force Base), Alabama, 29 May 1947 - 27 June 1949
- Altus Air Force Base, Oklahoma, 18 November 1953
- Dyess Air Force Base, Texas, 8 September 1957 - 15 March 1963
- Dyess Air Force Base, Texas, 15 September 1963 - 1 October 1994
- Dyess Air Force Base, Texas, 14 May 2004 – present

=== Aircraft ===
- Boeing B-17 Flying Fortress (1942–1945)
- North American AT-6 Texan (1947–1949)
- Beechcraft AT-11 Kansan (1947–1949)
- Boeing B-47 Stratojet (1955–1963)
- Boeing B-52 Stratofortress (1963–1970, 1970–1972, 1973–1985)
- Rockwell B-1 Lancer (1986–1994, 2004–present)

=== Awards and campaigns ===
Award streamer	Award	Dates	Notes
	Distinguished Unit Citation	17 August 1943	337th Bombardment Squadron, Germany
	Distinguished Unit Citation	9 April 1944	337th Bombardment Squadron, Poznań, Poland
	Air Force Outstanding Unit Award	1 January 1959 - 31 December 1960	337th Bombardment Squadron
	Air Force Outstanding Unit Award	1 July 1974 - 30 June 1975	337th Bombardment Squadron
	Air Force Outstanding Unit Award	1 July 1978 - 30 June 1979	337th Bombardment Squadron
	Air Force Outstanding Unit Award	1 July 1978 - 30 June 1979	337th Bombardment Squadron
	Air Force Outstanding Unit Award	1 July 1978 - 30 June 1979	337th Bombardment Squadron
	Air Force Outstanding Unit Award	[1 July 1990] - 29 May 1992	337th Bombardment Squadron (later 337th Bomb Squadron)
	Air Force Outstanding Unit Award	1 June 1992 - 30 May 1994	337th Bomb Squadron
	Air Force Outstanding Unit Award	1 June 2002 - 31 May 2004	337th Test & Evaluation Squadron
	Air Force Outstanding Unit Award	1 June 2004 - 31 May 2006	337th Test & Evaluation Squadron
	Air Force Outstanding Unit Award	1 June 2006 - 31 May 2008	337th Test & Evaluation Squadron
	Air Force Outstanding Unit Award	1 June 2018 - 31 May 2010	337th Test & Evaluation Squadron
	Air Force Outstanding Unit Award	1 June 2020 - 31 May 2022	337th Test & Evaluation Squadron

Campaign Streamer	Campaign	Dates	Notes
	Air Offensive, Europe	13 May 1943–5 June 1944	337th Bombardment Squadron
	Air Combat, EAME Theater	13 May 1943–11 May 1945	337th Bombardment Squadron
	Normandy	6 June 1944–24 July 1944	337th Bombardment Squadron
	Northern France	25 July 1944–14 September 1944	337th Bombardment Squadron
	Rhineland	15 September 1944–21 March 1945	337th Bombardment Squadron
	Ardennes-Alsace	16 December 1944–25 January 1945	337th Bombardment Squadron
	Central Europe	22 March 1944–21 May 1945	337th Bombardment Squadron

== See also ==
- B-17 Flying Fortress units of the United States Army Air Forces
- List of B-47 units of the United States Air Force
- List of B-52 Units of the United States Air Force
- List of B-1 units of the United States Air Force
