= 384th Air Expeditionary Wing =

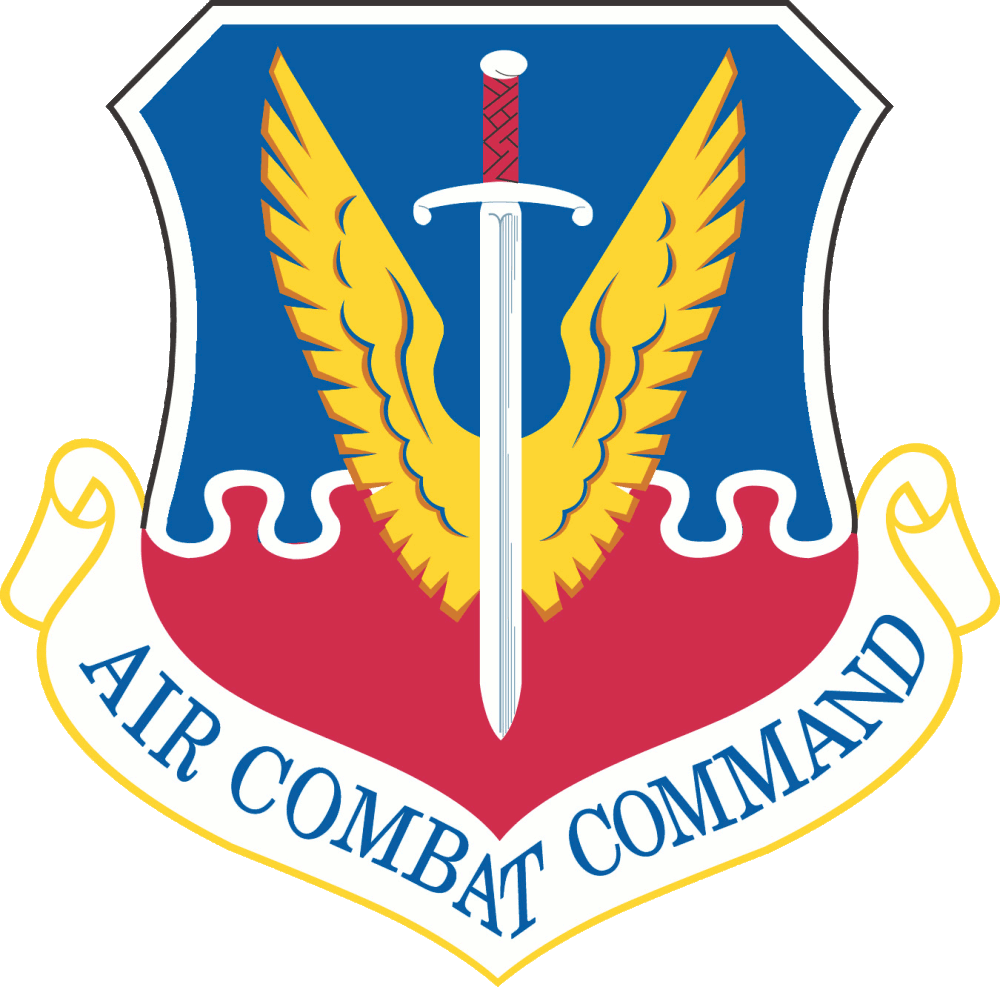
384th Air Expeditionary Wing

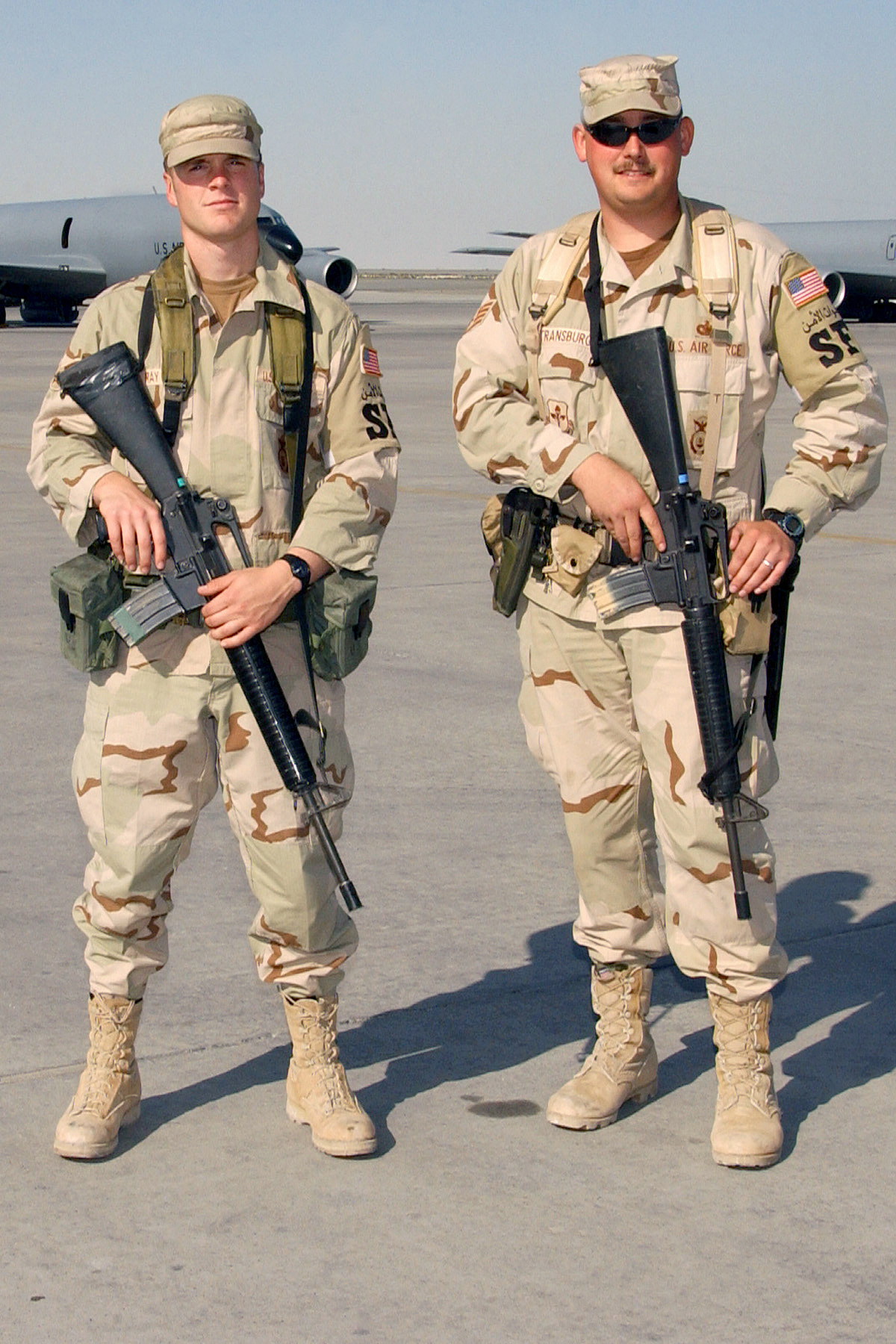
- Security forces stand guard on the 384th Wing flight line
- Active: 1942–1946; 1947–1949; 1955–1994; 2003–2004
- Country: United States
- Branch: United States Air Force
- Role: Aerial refueling
- Part of: Air Combat Command
- Motto: Keep the Show on the Road
- Engagements: European Theater of Operations
- Decorations: Distinguished Unit Citation

Commanders
- Notable commanders: Charles T. Robertson Jr.

Insignia
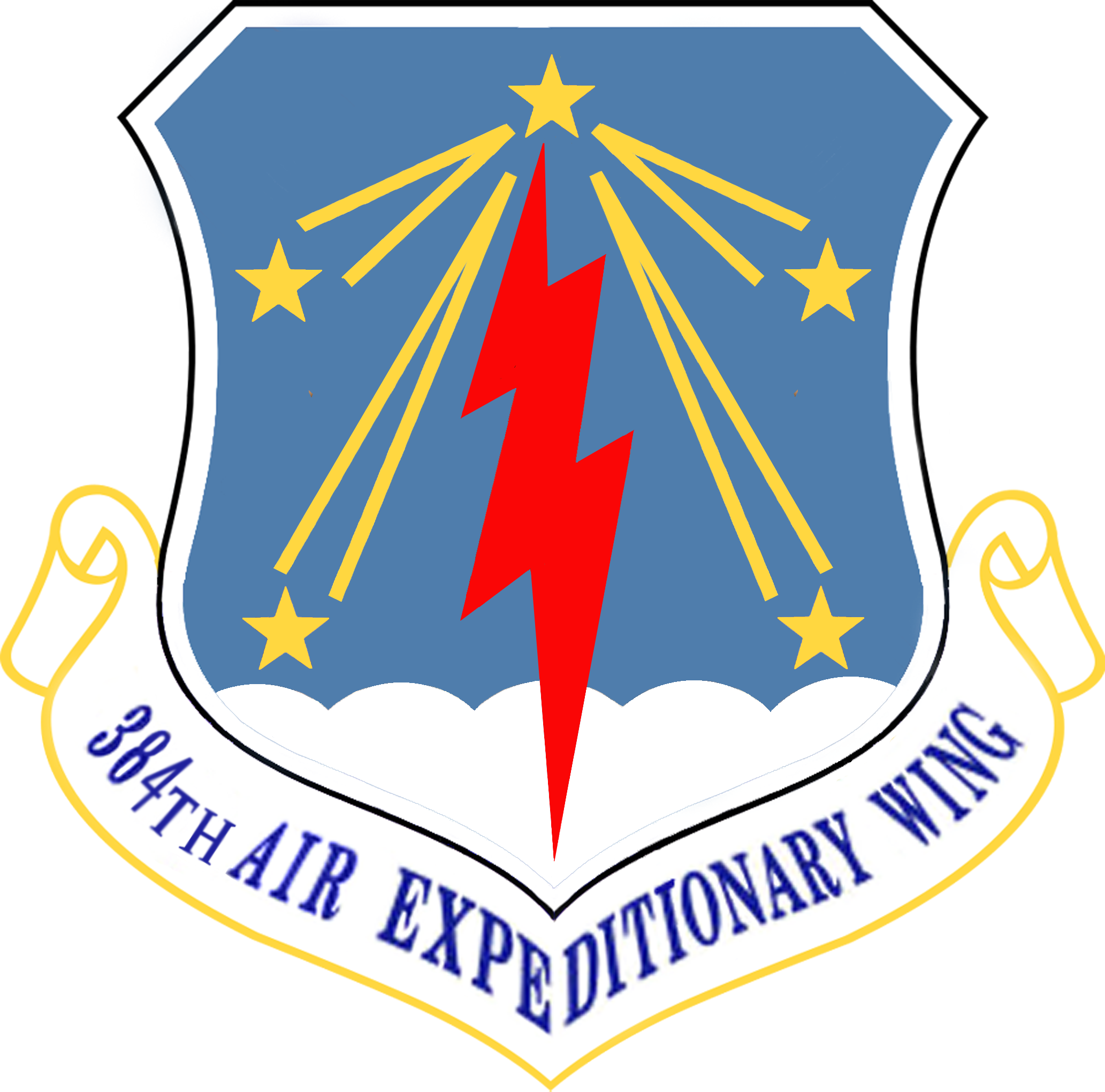
- 384th Air Expeditionary Wing emblem

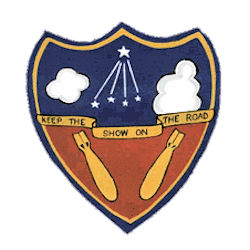
- 384th Bombardment Group emblem: (Note: Approved 9 April 1958. Description: On a shield of the sky, between two cloud formations in chief and one in base throughout proper, five stars, one, two, and two or, the one in chief emitting a ray to each star of the like voided azure, and a lightning flash palewise to base gules fimbriated argent, alll within a diminutive border of the last [color mentioned].)
- 384th Bombardment Group tail code: Triangle P
- 384th Bomb Wing tail code: OZ

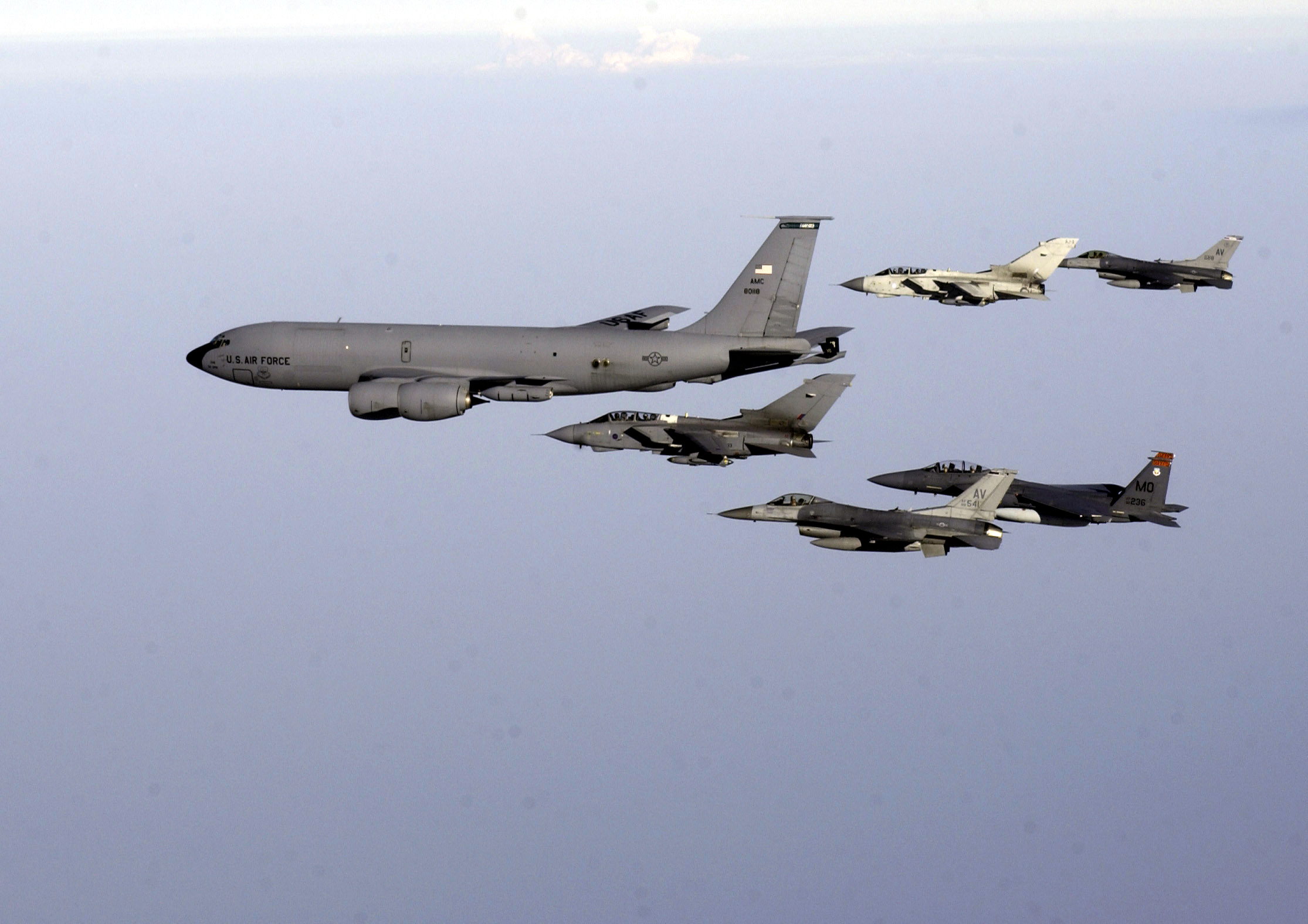
A KC-135 Stratotanker leads a formation of an F-15 Strike Eagle, two F-16 Fighting Falcons and two British GR4 Tornados

The 384th Air Expeditionary Wing is an inactive unit of the United States Air Force. Its last assignment was with the United States Central Command Air Forces, being stationed at Shaikh Isa Air Base, Bahrain. It was inactivated in 2004. The wing's mission is largely undisclosed. However, it is known that one of its missions was aerial refueling of combat aircraft.

== History ==
=== World War II ===
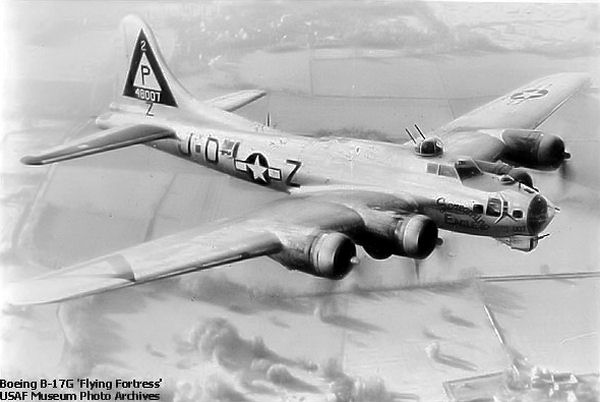
Lockheed/Vega B-17G-45-VE Fortress Serial 44-8007 "Screaming Eagle" of the 545th Bomb Squadron.

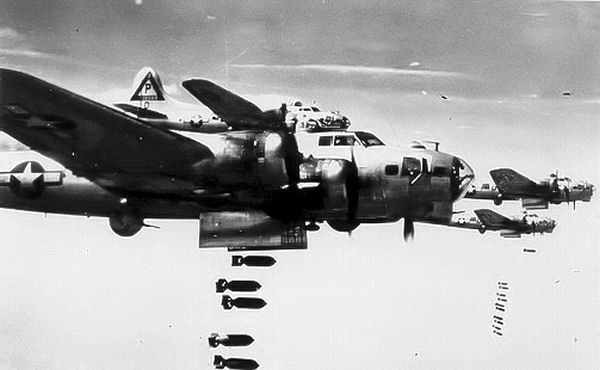
B-17s of the 384th Bomb Group on a bomb run.

The 384th Bombardment Group was activated 1 December 1942 at Gowen Field, Idaho. It began training at Wendover Field, Utah on 2 January 1943 to 1 April 1943. It moved to Sioux City Army Air Base, Iowa for final training. The ground unit left for Camp Kilmer on 9 May 1943, sailing on the RMS Queen Elizabeth on 27 May 1943 and arrived in Greenock, Scotland on 2 June 1943. The aircraft left Sioux City for Kearney Army Air Field, Nebraska on 3 May 1943, and then to the United Kingdom via Bangor, Goose Bay, and then Gander. One B-17 ditched in the Atlantic but the crew was rescued. The first aircraft arrived into England on 25 May 1943, being stationed at RAF Grafton Underwood. The 384th was assigned to the 41st Combat Bombardment Wing of the 1st Bombardment Division.

The group's targets included aerodromes at Orléans, Bricy, and Nancy; motor works at Cologne; a coking plant at Gelsenkirchen; an aircraft component parts factory at Halberstadt; weapons manufacturers at Solingen; steel works at Magdeburg; and ball-bearing plants at Schweinfurt. The Group made a damaging raid on aircraft factories in central Germany on 11 January 1944 and received a Distinguished Unit Citation (DUC) for the action.

The 384th took part in the campaign of heavy bombers against the German aircraft industry during Big Week, 20–25 February 1944. Received another DUC for the mission of 24 April 1944 when the group, although crippled by heavy losses of men and planes, led the 41st Wing through almost overwhelming opposition to attack an aircraft factory and airfield at Oberpfaffenhofen. The group also bombed ports, communications centers, oil facilities, and cities, attacking such targets as oil storage plants in Leipzig and Berlin, ports at Hamburg and Emden, and marshalling yards at Duren and Mannheim.

At times the group flew interdictory and support missions. Attacked installations along the coast of Normandy prior to and during the invasion in June 1944 and then bombed airfields and communications beyond the beachhead. Supported ground troops during Operation Cobra, the breakthrough at Saint-Lô, 24–25 July, by bombing enemy strong points just beyond Allied lines. Hit tank and gun concentrations north of Eindhoven to assist Operation Market-Garden, the airborne assault on the Netherlands, in September. Struck enemy communications and fortifications during the Battle of the Bulge, December 1944 – January 1945. Aided the Allied assault across the Rhine in March 1945 by attacking marshalling yards, railway junctions, and bridges to cut off enemy supplies.

For the 1945 film The Way to the Stars, footage of B-17 Flying Fortresses of the 384th landing and taking off was filmed at Grafton Underwood in April and May 1945. One of the aircrew involved recorded in his diary seeing B-17s of the 384th and ground scenes being filmed at RAF Grafton Underwood.

Scheduled for occupational air forces and moved to Istres Air Base, France in June 1945 to participate in Project Green, which was to move troops to staging areas. It also moved displaced persons and Greek military. In 1946 the remaining aircraft and personnel were absorbed into the 306th Bombardment Group and the unit was inactivated at Istres on 28 February 1946.

=== Air reserves ===
The group was reactivated in the reserves unit under Air Defense Command (ADC) at Nashville Municipal Airport, Tennessee in July 1947 as a very heavy group. It is not clear whether or not the group was fully staffed or equipped with operational aircraft. Aircraft were allotted to reserve units as a means of maintaining flying proficiency, not combat readiness. Aircraft assigned to the reserves were overwhelmingly trainers, and no heavy bombers were ever assigned In 1947, ADC was directed to eliminate 29 reserve training bases. The allotment of units to the reserves was made only for planning purposes and mobilization plans called for personnel assigned to the units to be called to active duty during mobilization as individuals, not as units.

In 1948 Continental Air Command assumed responsibility for managing reserve and Air National Guard units from ADC. /> President Truman’s reduced 1949 defense budget required reductions in the number of units in the Air Force, The Air Force reorganized its operational reserve forces into 25 wings located at 23 reserve training centers, a reduction of 18 training centers. As a result, the 384th was inactivated .

=== Cold War ===
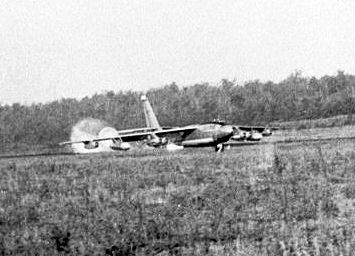
384th Bomb Wing B-47 landing at Little Rock AFB, Arkansas

The 384th Bombardment Wing of the United States Air Force Strategic Air Command was established at Little Rock Air Force Base, Arkansas 1 August 1955. With its establishment, the 384th Bomb Group was activated as the operational group of the wing, bestowing its World War II honors, heritage and colors to the new Wing. Operational squadrons of the wing were the 544th, 545th, and 546th Bomb Squadrons. It was equipped with the Boeing B-47E Stratojet.

The 384th was certified combat ready just nine months after receiving its first aircraft. Stringent SAC requirements called for a specified percentage of the crews to be certified in order for the wing to be considered combat ready. Since aircrew members were fresh out of student status, beginning to arrive about the same times the aircraft did, preparing the group to become fully combat ready was a tremendous task. The culture of the organization would accept nothing less than full effort, and when the newly formed wing was mission capable by September 1956, it became the first such SAC wing to do so in such a short time.

The 384th handled bomber alert duties, spending countless days and nights on alert status with their aircraft armed, fueled, and ready to go at a moment's notice. The 384th aircrews also commonly participated in Operation Reflex, spending short but continually recurring periods of time at forward locations around the world.

The era of the Stratojet ended on 1 September 1964 when the 384 BW inactivated with the phaseout of the B-47 from the USAF inventory.

=== Air refueling ===
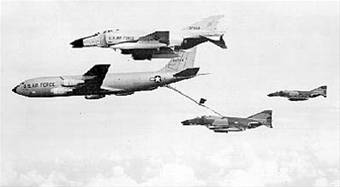
In flight refueling of F-4C-20-MC (S/N 63-7650) (closest aircraft) with KC-135 (Tail No. 00368).

The 384th was reactivated on 1 December 1972 as the 384th Air Refueling Wing, Heavy at McConnell Air Force Base, Kansas with Boeing KC-135A Stratotankers and took command of the 91st Air Refueling Squadron. It was assigned to the 12th Strategic Missile Division, Fifteenth Air Force, Strategic Air Command.

From McConnell, the wing deployed aircraft and crews on a worldwide basis, engaging in actual and simulated tactical and strategic operations, including air refueling support for the evacuation of South Vietnamese and Americans from South Vietnam in 1975. The wing maintained proficiency in air refueling in support of SAC units and other units as directed.

The wing was reassigned to Second Air Force, 19th Air Division on 1 July 1973. On 30 September 1973, a second KC-135A refueling squadron, the 384th ARS was activated on the base, making McConnell an air refueling hub for SAC. The wing was again reassigned to Eighth Air Force, 19th Air Division on 1 January 1975.

In early 1983, the 384 ARW's leadership learned that it would be the first wing to receive the new Boeing KC-135R model tanker. The 91st and 384th ARW were both upgraded to the new model in 1984. The "R" model had upgraded engines which produce much greater fuel efficiency than the older models, as well as having a higher on-board fuel storage capacity. The initial aircraft marking for both squadrons was a light blue/navy blue diamond checkerboard fin flash.

=== B-1B Era ===
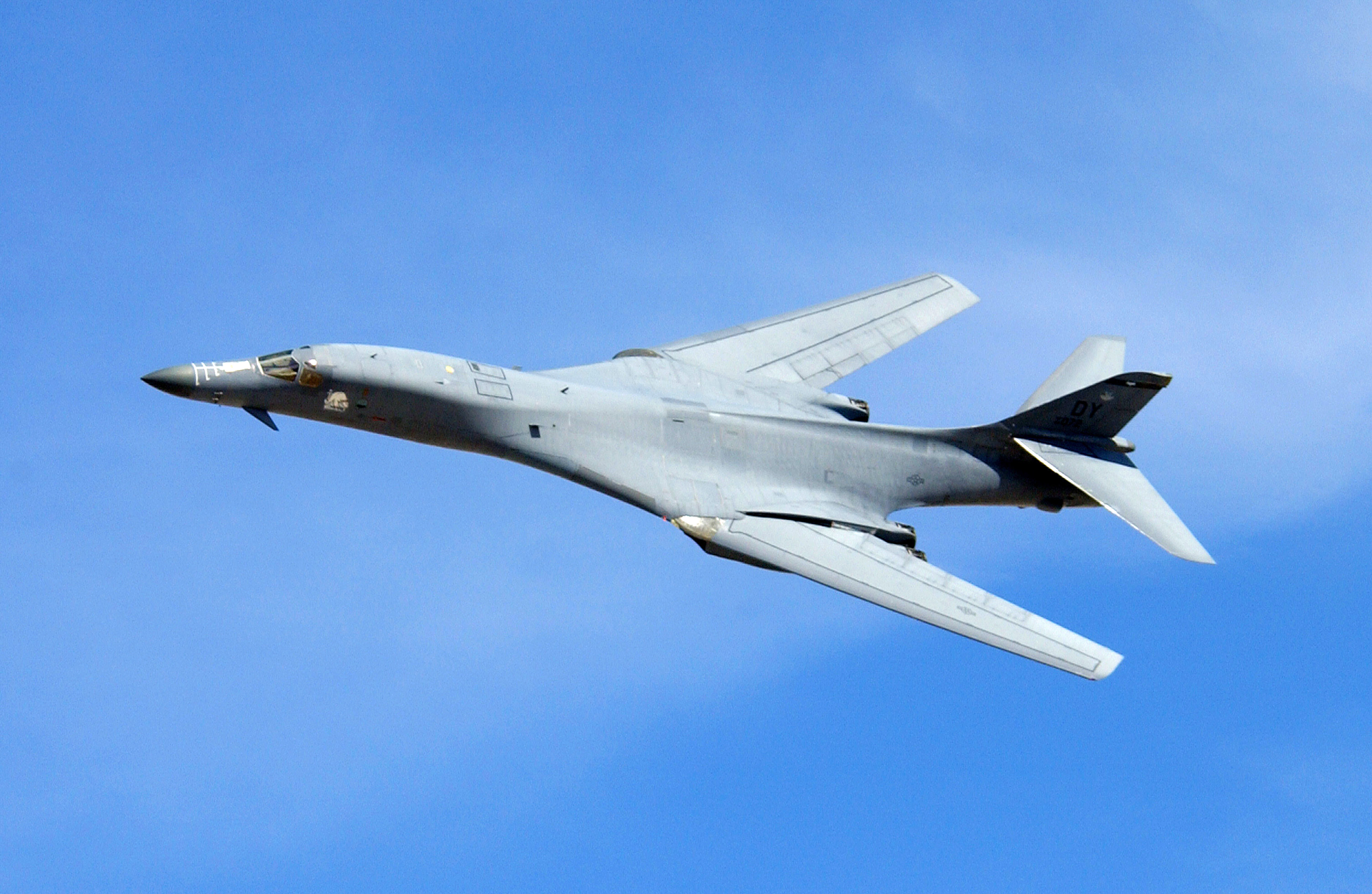
B-1B of the 28th Bomb Squadron

On 2 October 1981, President Ronald Reagan announced a Strategic Modernization Program (SMP), a key feature of which would be the procurement of 100 North American–Rockwell B-1B bombers. The first production models entered the USAF inventory in March 1985. It was announced by the Air Force that McConnell would be equipped with the B-1B in 1987. The 384th was redesignated as the 384th Bombardment Wing, Heavy on 1 July 1987, and the 28th Bombardment Squadron was activated that date to fly the 25 bombers assigned to the wing. Aircrews for the initial cadre that formed the 28th BMS arrived for training at Dyess AFB, TX in October 1987, with the first crews arriving for duty at McConnell AFB, KS in March – June 1988. With the arrival of the B-1s, the 91st ARS was inactivated, leaving the wing with one KC-135 tanker squadron. The 91st was later reactivated in July 1988 with the new 301st ARW at Malmstrom Air Force Base, Montana with KC-135R aircraft.

Throughout 1988–1989, the Wing continued to train to the full capabilities of the B-1B Bomber. The big push through 1989 was certifying all bomber crews in night terrain-following flying and for the Wing to become Mission Ready to perform its SIOP mission. These efforts paid-off with the 384 Bomb Wing winning the "Best ORI in SAC" award for 1989. In addition, that year, the Wing achieved the "Best B-1 Crew" while performing in the Fifteenth Air Force Bombing Competition. In 1990, the Bomb Wing again won top honors in SAC. That year it recorded the highest score during an ORI by any Bomb Wing in the history of SAC and its B-1B crews were rated outstandingir in war fighting capability.

In August 1990, Iraq invaded neighboring Kuwait. McConnell tanker personnel and aircraft were deployed throughout the Middle East, performing refueling missions of Coalition aircraft in support of Operation Desert Shield/Desert Storm to help eject the invaders from the small kingdom of Kuwait. The wing's B-1B aircraft, however, were not used in Desert Storm, the official reason being that the B-1Bs were all needed to stand nuclear alert – which they did. However, at that time the B-1B had been encountering a rash of turbofan blade failures that caused the aircraft to be grounded through most of Desert Storm. At the same time, required weapons testing for the safe release of conventional bomb delivery had encountered test problems, and the aircraft was not certified to drop conventional weapons until after the war ended.

=== From 1991 ===
With the end of the Cold War, the Air Force went through many changes. One of these changes was the Objective Wing concept, with created "Operations Groups" (OG) to place all operational aircraft squadrons under one organization. The 384th engaged this change on 1 September 1991 and was re-designated as the 384th Wing (384 WG), with the 28th Bomb Squadron (B-1B) and the 384th Air Refueling Squadron (KC-135R) as its operational units.

On 1 June 1992, Strategic Air Command (SAC) was inactivated as part of a massive realignment of the Air Force command structure. The 384th was assigned to the newly established Air Combat Command (ACC), a new command which replaced SAC, TAC and elements of Military Airlift Command (MAC). The wing was again redesignated as the 384th Bomb Wing, and the 28 BS aircraft were assigned the tail code "OZ". The 384 ARS was relieved from assignment to McConnell, and was reassigned to the 19th Operations Group of the 19th Air Refueling Wing at Robins AFB, Georgia.

As a result of a Base Realignment and Closure (BRAC) Commission related realignment, March AFB, California was taken off active duty status and reassigned to the Air Force Reserve Command as an air reserve base. As part of a program to keep historically significant wings active, its 22d Air Refueling Wing was reassigned to McConnell without personnel or equipment on 1 January 1994. As a result, on 1 January, the 384th was re-designated as the 384th Bomb Group as a unit under the 22 ARW.

The USAF planned to return McConnell AFB to being an air refueling hub, and as a result the B-1 equipped 28th Bomb Squadron was reassigned without equipment or personnel to the 7 OG at Dyess AFB, Texas on 1 October 1994 and the 384 BG was inactivated on 30 September 1994.

=== Global War on Terror ===
The 384th AEW was in existence at an unidentified Middle Eastern location in June 2002.

On 4 June, the 319th Air Expeditionary Group operating from Shaik Isa Airbase, Bahrain, was redesignated as the 384th Air Expeditionary Group, which was redesignated as the 384th Air Expeditionary Wing on 3 September.

The Wing was inactivated in 2004.

Other reports have suggested that the 319th AEG was operating from 'Base X' in Oman, which other sources labelled Masirah Air Base.

== Lineage ==
384th Bombardment Group

- Constituted as 384th Bombardment Group (Heavy) on 25 November 1942

Activated on 1 December 1942
Redesignated 384th Bombardment Group, Heavy on 11 August 1944
Inactivated on 28 February 1946
Redesignated 384th Bombardment Group, Very Heavy
Activated on 16 July 1947
Inactivated on 27 June 1949

- Established as the 384th Bombardment Wing, Medium on 23 March 1953

Consolidated with the 384th Bombardment Wing on 31 January 1984

384th Air Expeditionary Wing
Activated on 1 August 1955
Discontinued, and inactivated, on 1 September 1964
Redesignated 384th Air Refueling Wing, Heavy on 15 November 1972
Activated on 1 December 1972
Consolidated with the 384th Bombardment Group on 31 January 1984
Redesignated 384th Bombardment Wing, Heavy on 1 July 1987
Redesignated 384th Wing on 1 September 1991
Redesignated 384th Bomb Wing on 1 June 1992
Redesignated 384th Bomb Group on 1 January 1994
Inactivated on 1 October 1994
Redesignated 384th Air Expeditionary Group and converted to provisional status on 4 December 2001
Activated on 4 June 2003
Redesignated 384th Air Expeditionary Wing on 3 September 2003 (Note: DAF/XMP Letter 273s redesignated the unit as the 384th Air Expeditionary Group. DAF/XPM Letter 273s-9, 7 August 2002 revoked this action retroactively and designated it as a wing.)
Inactivated in 2004

=== Assignments ===
- II Bomber Command, 1 December 1942 – 9 May 1943
- 1st Bombardment Wing, June 1943 (attached to 103d Provisional Combat Bombardment Wing)
- 41st Combat Bombardment Wing, 13 September 1943
- European Air Materiel Command, 16 June 1945 – 28 February 1946
- Tenth Air Force, 16 July 1947 – 27 June 1949
- 825th Air Division (later 825th Strategic Aerospace Division), 1 August 1955 – 1 September 1964

Attached to 7th Air Division, 3 January-5 April 1957

- 12th Strategic Missile (later, 12th Air) Division, 1 December 1972
- 19th Air Division, 1 July 1973
- Eighth Air Force, 13 June 1988
- Fifteenth Air Force, 1 July 1989
- 22d Air Refueling Wing, 1 January – 1 October 1994
- Air Combat Command to activate or inactivate at any time after 1 June 2003

United States Central Command Air Forces, 3 September 2003 – 2004

=== Components ===
Operational units

- 384th Operations Group: 1 September 1991 – 1 January 1994
- 28th Bombardment Squadron (later 28th Bomb Squadron): 1 July 1987 – 1 September 1991, 1 January 1994 – 1 October 1994
- 70th Air Refueling Squadron: 1 August 1961 – 1 September 1964 (detached 31 July – 28 September 1962, attached to 43d Bombardment Wing) after c. 19 August 1964)
- 91st Air Refueling Squadron: 1 December 1972 – 1 October 1987
- 384th Air Refueling Squadron: 30 September 1973 – 1 September 1991
- 338th Bombardment Squadron: (Jackson Army Air Base, Mississippi) 8 October 1947 – 27 June 1949
- 339th Bombardment Squadron: (Jackson Army Air Base, Mississippi) 8 October 1947 – 27 June 1949
- 544th Bombardment Squadron: 1 December 1942 – 25 February 1946, 16 July 1947 – 27 June 1949, 1 August 1955 – 1 September 1964
- 545th Bombardment Squadron: 1 December 1942 – 25 February 1946, 16 July 1947 – 27 June 1949, 1 August 1955 – 1 September 1964
- 546th Bombardment Squadron: 1 December 1942 – 25 February 1946, 1 August 1955 – 1 September 1964
- 547th Bombardment Squadron: 1 December 1942 – 25 February 1946, 1 September 1958 – 1 January 1962

Support units

- 384th Logistics Group: 1 September 1991 – 1 January 1994
- 384th Combat Support Group (later 384th Support Group): 8 August 1986 – 1 January 1994
- USAF Hospital, McConnell (later 384th Strategic Hospital, 384th Medical Group): 8 August 1986 – 1 January 1994
- 27th Munitions Maintenance Squadron: 1 July 1960 – 1 September 1964
- 384th Armament and Electronics Maintenance Squadron (later 384th Avionics Maintenance Squadron): 1 August 1955 – 1 September 1964, 30 September 1973 – 1 September 1991
- 384th Field Maintenance Squadron (later 384th Consolidated Aircraft Maintenance Squadron, 384th Field Maintenance Squadron): 1 August 1955 – 1 September 1964, 1 December 1972 – 1 September 1991
- 384th Periodic Maintenance Squadron: (later 384th Organiational Maintenance Squadron): 1 August 1955 – 1 September 1964, 30 September 1973 – 1 September 1991
- 384th Support Squadron: 1 January 1994 – 1 October 1994

=== Stations ===
- Gowen Field, Idaho, 1 December 1942
- Wendover Field, Utah, 2 January 1943
- Sioux City Army Air Base, Iowa, c. 3 April – 9 May 1943
- RAF Grafton Underwood (Station 106), England, June 1943
- Istres Air Base, France, c. June 1945-28 February 1946
- Nashville Municipal Airport, Tennessee, 16 July 1947 – 27 June 1949
- Little Rock Air Force Base, Arkansas, 1 August 1955 – 1 September 1964
- McConnell Air Force Base, Kansas, 1 December 1972 – 1 October 1994
- Shaikh Isa Air Base, Bahrain, 3 September 2003 – 2004

=== Aircraft ===
- KC-135 (2003–2004)
- B-1B (1988–1994)
- KC-135 (1964; 1972–1994)
- KC-97 (1961–1963)
- B-47 (1956–1964)

== See also ==
- List of B-47 units of the United States Air Force
