= BPCP =

BPCP can refer to:

- BP Cherry Point Refinery
- Balboa Park Cultural Partnership, serving Balboa Park (San Diego)
- G-BPCP, a small aircraft that crashed in the Channel Islands in 1980 - see List of aviation accidents and incidents in the Channel Islands
