= List of aviation accidents and incidents in the Channel Islands =

This article lists some of the aviation accidents and incidents in the Channel Islands from the 1910s to the 2010s.

== 1910s ==
(Guernsey) (France) In May 1917, a French seaplane, operating out of the Saint Peter Port French seaplane base, crashed, killing the pilot officer.

== 1930s ==
On 29 June 1936, a de Havilland DH.84 Dragon Rozel Bay overshot Alderney Airport. It was landing with six passengers on board and the pilot, new to the airline, ran out of runway breaking the starboard propeller and damaging the undercarriage as he hit a bank. There were no fatalities and the aircraft flew soon after.

On 31 July 1936, a Saro A.19 Cloud amphibian (registration: G-ABXW) "Cloud of Iona" went missing on a flight from Guernsey to Jersey on a stormy evening. All ten occupants died. The investigation concluded that the aircraft was forced to land in the sea due to loss of engine power, and was then swamped by the waves.

On 4 November 1938, a DH.86 G-ACZN "St. Catherine's Bay" crashed at St. Peter's shortly after take-off from Jersey airport, en route to Southampton. All 13 occupants were killed in addition to one person on the ground.

== 1940s ==
Civil flying was entirely disallowed during the German occupation of the Channel Islands from June 1940 - May 1945. However, many British and Luftwaffe aircraft crashlanded in and around the islands, with 139 fatal Allied casualties. A memorial to the Allied casualties has been erected at Guernsey Airport

=== World War 2 ===
(Luftwaffe) On 29 July 1940 a Heinkel He 111 from I/KG 27 crashed into the sea near Guernsey, the crew survived.

(Luftwaffe) On 9 August 1940 a Messerschmitt Bf 109F from I/JG 53 crashed into a Flak position at Guernsey Airport, 80% damage, 3 gunners died.

(Luftwaffe) On 13 August 1940 a Junkers Ju 87R of II/SG 2 which had been damaged by a Supermarine Spitfire from No. 609 Squadron RAF, crashed into the sea near Guernsey both crew died.

(Luftwaffe) On 13 August 1940 a Messerschmitt Bf 109E-4 of II/JG 53 crashed on takeoff from Guernsey Airport, 30% damage, the pilot was unhurt. The plane was left unguarded overnight and souvenir hunters stripped it. A request in the local newspaper resulted in a few hundredweight being delivered to the police station.

(Luftwaffe) On 23 August 1940 a Junkers Ju 52 (serial: 6324) from IV KGr.z.b.V. 10 suffered mechanical failure and crashed at Jersey Airport, 70% loss.

(Luftwaffe) On 25 September 1940, a Dornier Do 18 (serial: 0881) was shot down by a Bristol Blenheim from No. 236 Squadron RAF near Guernsey 5 crew seen in dinghy.

On 16 October 1940, an Avro Anson (registration: N9889 MW-S) from No. 217 Squadron RAF on a photographic mission ditched during a storm west of Guernsey. The crew of 4 came ashore in Guernsey and taken as POW's.

(Luftwaffe) On 1 November 1940, a Dornier Do 17P (serial: 4086) from 3./(F) 123 of (Aufklärungsgruppe 123 a long-range reconnaissance unit) on a training flight crashed on La Rocco Tower while attempting to land at Jersey Airport. All 4 on board died and plane destroyed.

(Luftwaffe) On 3 November 1940, a Junkers Ju 88A-1 (serial: 0255) from 1./(F) 123 crashed at Jersey Airport following a technical failure. 20% damage, crew OK.

(Luftwaffe) On 5 November 1940, a Bücker Bü 131 (serial: 4494) from 1./(F) 123 crashed at Rozel Jersey the parachute failed and the pilot died.

(Luftwaffe) On 5 November 1940, a Junkers Ju 88A-1 (serial: 0366) from 3./(F) 123 crashed at Jersey Airport. 40% destroyed.

(Luftwaffe) On 7 November 1940, a Junkers Ju 52 crashed and overturned at Jersey Airport. Casualties over 20, mainly pilots who had finished a training course.

(Luftwaffe) On 19 November 1940, a Heinkel He 111 (serial: 2768) from 3. KGr. 100 (pathfinder squadron) crashed following an engine fire on Crevichon near Jethou off Guernsey, the full bomb load exploding, damaging some buildings on Jethou, the crew of four was killed.

(Luftwaffe) On 27 December 1940, a German aircraft, maybe a Junkers Ju 52 crashes and burns at Jersey Airport

(Luftwaffe) On 30 December 1940, an Arado Ar 196 (serial: 0124) from 5. /K%FCFlGr. 196 crashed on landing at Alderney due to bad weather.

(Luftwaffe) On 16 January 1941, a Junkers Ju 52 crashed off St Catherines breakwater, Jersey

(Luftwaffe) On 22 January 1941, a Junkers Ju 88A from 2 (F)/123 (serial: 0401) crashed at Jersey Airport due to pilot error on landing, 15% damage, crew OK.

(Luftwaffe) On 19 February 1941, a Dornier Do 17P (serial: 4175) from 3./(F) 123 crashed at Jersey Airport. 30% destroyed.

(Luftwaffe) On 20 February 1941, a Junkers Ju 52A-5 (serial: 466) from 5./(F) 122 crashed at Jersey Airport following damage from enemy Supermarine Spitfire fire. 25% damage. One wounded.

(Luftwaffe) In February 1941, a Junkers Ju 52 crashed at Jersey Airport.

(Luftwaffe) On 10 March 1941, a Junkers Ju 88F from 5 (F)/122 (serial: 0390) collided at Jersey Airport suffering 50% damage with another Junkers Ju 88F-5 (F)/122, suffering 80% damage.

(Luftwaffe) On 14 March 1941, a Junkers Ju 88A from 3 (F)/123 (serial: 0559) crashed at La Corbière Jersey, crew KIA. 100% loss.

On 11/12 April 1941, a Hawker Hurricane on a night intruder operation ran out of fuel, the pilot bailed out and landed on Lihou Guernsey and became a prisoner of war.

(Luftwaffe) On 3 October 1941, a Junkers Ju 88A-5 collided with another Ju 88 at Jersey Airport, crew OK.

On 2 November 1941, Supermarine Spitfire (serial: W3830) from No. 234 Squadron RAF, piloted by Pilot Officer B.W. Meyer (USA), crash landed on Alderney, the pilot was sent to Stalag Luft III.

On 8 November 1941, Supermarine Spitfire (serial: AD188) from No. 501 Squadron RAF, piloted by Pilot Officer W.J.H. Greenway, crashed on a beach in Alderney, the pilot was sent to Stalag Luft III.

(Luftwaffe) On 29 December 1941, a Messerschmitt Bf 109F-2 crashed at Saint Ouen, Jersey following engine failure, pilot OK.

(Luftwaffe) On 2 January 1942, an aircraft crashed in Bouley Bay Jersey after being shot down by an RAF plane.

(Luftwaffe) On 24 June 1942, a Focke-Wulf Fw 190A-2 (serial: 5291) from III. /JG 2 was rammed by a landing aircraft at Guernsey Airport. 30% damage.

On 24 October 1942, an Avro Lancaster (serial: W4121) from No. 207 Squadron RAF, returning from a raid on Milan, came down north of Guernsey, no survivors from crew of nine.

On 18 November 1942, a Supermarine Spitfire Vb (serial: EN830), of 131 Squadron, was hit by Flak over France and crash landed on Jersey in a turnip field. The Free French pilot, P/O Bernard Scheidhauer, waited with locals for the Germans to arrive and was captured. The aircraft was recovered and freighted to Germany where the aircraft was tested using a German engine designed for a Messerschmitt Bf 109. The Pilot was executed after escaping from Stalag Luft III in 1944.

On 23 November 1942, an Avro Lancaster (serial: W4107) from No. 49 Squadron RAF, crash-landed in the field opposite Seigneurie farm on Sark, having run out of fuel. They thought they were landing in the Isle of Wight. All the crew were survivors, other crew having bailed out over France.

On 7 December 1942, a Westland Whirlwind (serial: P6987) from No. 263 Squadron RAF crashed, after flying through heavy flak, south of Jersey after attacking shipping in St. Helier harbour.

On 7 December 1942, a Westland Whirlwind (serial: P7105) from No. 263 Squadron RAF piloted by the Sqdn Leader was hit by flak and ditched south of Jersey after attacking shipping. The pilot was killed.

On 25 January 1943, a Supermarine Spitfire IV (serial: BR660) from No. 541 Squadron RAF suffered a mechanical issue and came down close to Guernsey.

On 10 April 1943, a Vickers Wellington from 431 Sqdn, came down in Saint Ouen, Jersey bay.

On 13 June 1943, a Lockheed Ventura (serial: AE937 SB-E) from No. 464 Squadron RAAF was shot down by a Focke-Wulf Fw 190 close to Guernsey

On 13 June 1943, a Supermarine Spitfire II from No. 276 Squadron RAF was shot down by a Focke-Wulf Fw 190 and crashed, the pilot paddled ashore in Jersey.

(Luftwaffe) On 13 June 1943, a seaplane crashed north of Jersey on takeoff, after rescuing downed British pilot, crew hurt.

On 15 June 1943, a Supermarine Spitfire (serial: BR319 YQ-C) from No. 616 Squadron RAF, on an anti shipping patrol, crashed north of Sark

On 15 June 1943, a Westland Whirlwind (serial: P7000) from No. 263 Squadron RAF exploded in flames and crashed, after sinking a German Minesweeper M483, north of Sark

(Luftwaffe) On 15 June 1943, a Dornier Do 18 seaplane crashes on takeoff at Saint Helier Jersey, the Pilot broke both legs.

(Guernsey) (Luftwaffe) On 25 July 1943, a Focke-Wulf Fw 190 A-4 (serial: 703) from 1. /NAGr. 13 was damaged following engine trouble. 20% damage.

(Luftwaffe) On 14 August 1943, a Heinkel He 111 was shot down by a Westland Whirlwind (fighter) from No. 263 Squadron RAF north of Guernsey

(Guernsey) (Luftwaffe) On 23 August 1943, a Focke-Wulf Fw 190 A-3 (serial: 304) from 2. NAGr./13 was shot down by friendly flak over Herm.

(Guernsey) (Luftwaffe) On 7 September 1943, a Focke-Wulf Fw 190 A-3 (serial: 351) from 2. /NAGr. 12 Overturned on landing due to pilot error. 75% damage.

On 31 December 1943, a Boeing B-17 Flying Fortress IIRC "Speed Ball" (serial: 42-37731) from 511th BS of the 351st Bomb Group was attacked by fighters, damaged and ditched at 14.30, 12 miles north of Guernsey 1 KIA, 9 took to boats but only two were picked up next morning and made POW's.

On 31 December 1943, a Boeing B-17 Flying Fortress IIRC "Piccadilly Commando" (serial: 42-29630) from 508th BS of the 351st Bomb Group was damaged over an airfield near Cognac, losing two engines and height the plane ditched west of Guernsey 11 were rescued from a reef and became POW's.

On 27/28 January 1944, an Avro Lancaster (serial: W4315) from No. 61 Squadron RAF crashed north of Guernsey

On 7 February 1944, a Mustang P-51B of 355th Fighter Squadron of the 354th Pioneer Mustang Group, 9th US Army Air Force, escorting bombers back from a raid on Germany was badly damaged and off course when he was shot down by flak over Saint Ouen, Jersey. The pilot bailed out and was injured on landing then captured, becoming a prisoner of war.

On 28 February 1944, a Hawker Typhoon (serial: JP730) from No. 247 Squadron RAF came down north of Sark

(Luftwaffe) On 7 March 1944, a Focke-Wulf Fw 190A-4 (serial: 7099) from 9./JG 2 crashed at La Ponchez, Castel, Guernsey Pilot KIA.

(Luftwaffe) On 19 March 1944, a Heinkel He 177 was shot down by a Bristol Beaufighter SW of Guernsey.

(Luftwaffe) On 23 March 1944, a Focke-Wulf Fw 190 was shot up as it came in to land at Guernsey Airport, slight damage.

(Luftwaffe) In April 1944, a Junkers Ju 88 was shot down by a night fighter off Alderney.

(Luftwaffe) On 6 April 1944, a Junkers Ju 88A-4 crashed at Eden Chapel, St Martin Jersey Shot down in error by flak Crew x 4 KIA.

On 23 April 1944, an unknown aircraft washed ashore La Rocque Jersey

(Luftwaffe) On 14/15 May 1944, a Junkers Ju 188 A-2 of I/KG 2 was shot down by a Bristol Beaufighter from No. 604 Squadron RAF, crashing into the sea off Guernsey, the crew bailed out and was rescued.

(Guernsey) In June 1944 a carrier borne Grumman F6F Hellcat crashed after being hit by flak on the beach north of Herm The pilot became a prisoner of war.

On 2 June 1944, a Supermarine Spitfire (serial: MB843) from No. 41 Squadron RAF on an early morning shipping reconnaissance to Peter Point, Guernsey, then on to St Malo. Shot down by Flak from Brehon Tower near Guernsey. Hit in the radiator. The American RAFVR pilot bailed out 4 to 6 miles northeast of Guernsey and became a POW.

(Guernsey) On 5 June 1944, a Hawker Typhoon from 439 Sqdn crashed close to the Saint Peter Port harbour mouth.

On 7 June 1944, a Supermarine Spitfire (serial: MB881) from No. 41 Squadron RAF escorting Typhoons on a shipping strike against Saint Peter Port, it was hit by flak. The pilot bailed out of the aircraft which crashed into the sea SE Sark, attempted recovery failed and he did not survive.

On 8 June 1944 a Boeing B-17 Flying Fortress "Our Captain" (serial: 42-97238) from 534th Bombardment Squadron, part of 381 BG, on mission 131 was hit by flak over Lorient damaging 2 engines and losing height ditched 30 miles west of Jersey. Two Supermarine Spitfires located the crew in their rafts, followed by a Vickers Warwick which dropped a motor boat by parachute, enabling the crew to make their safe escape.

On 11 June 1944, a Boeing B-17 Flying Fortress (serial: 42-97693) crashed five miles north west of Grand Havre, Guernsey

On 14 June 1944, a Hawker Typhoon (serial: MN661) from 263 squadron crashed on Jersey, the Belgian pilot was killed.

On 19 June 1944, a Boeing B-17 Flying Fortress F "Idiot's Delight" (serial: 42-30301) was hit by Flak from Alderney and ditched in the sea.

(Luftwaffe) On 20 June 1944, a Heinkel He 111 crashed in flames at Samarès Jersey.

(Guernsey) (Luftwaffe) On 21 June 1944 a German bomber was hit by flak from a St Peter Port flak ship and crashed, the crew of 5 all died.

On 17 July 1944 a Boeing B-17 Flying Fortress G (serial: 43-37971) from 545th Bombardment Squadron part of 384 BG, crash landed, en route to France, in Guernsey. The aircraft was salvaged on 12 June 1945.

(Alderney) On 27 July 1944, an Avro Lancaster crashed into the sea east of Essex Castle. No boat was sent out from Braye harbour and no assistance was provided to try rescuing the crew.

On 9/10 August 1944, a Short Stirling (serial: EF256) from No. 620 Squadron RAF on Operation Ditcher, ditched into the sea after being hit by anti-aircraft fire between Jersey and the French coast. The crew of 7 survived but 2 paratroopers from 3SAS drowned.

On 30 October 1944, a Douglas C-47 Skytrain (serial: 43-48592) already in trouble due to tech problems as it passed low over Jersey with its landing lights on as a sign of distress and believing the anti-aircraft fire was from US guns. Distress flares were dropped and German flak held off for a while. However, as it flew over the north coast a 20mm flak battery opened up and the plane crashed into the sea near to the small harbour of Bouley Bay. There was only one survivor.

7 January 1945, a Lockheed P-38 Lightning being ferried from the north of England got lost and thinking he was over the Isle of Wight signalled he intended to land, anti-aircraft guns fired and he crashed into the cliffs at Beauport, SW of Jersey, the wounded pilot, Lt Moutray, had parachuted out and was rescued from St Brelades Bay by lifeboat after a Jersey civilian, John De La Haye had paddled out to help him. De La Haye was awarded the US Medal of Freedom for his actions.

=== Post War ===
On 13 June 1945, a Boeing B-17 Flying Fortress (reference: P-47D) from 544th Bombardment Squadron, part of 384th BG, being used as a transport for demobilized personnel, suffered a landing accident at Guernsey Airport with damage rated as level 3 on a scale of 0–5.

14 June 1947, an Airspeed Consul, (registration: G-AHMC), operated by Westminster Airways crashed on landing at Jersey Airport. The aircraft was repaired and remained airworthy.

== 1950s ==
On 5 February 1951 an Avro Anson 652A (registration: G-AIXZ) undershot the Jersey Airport on approaching in fog. The aircraft was carrying national newspapers. The pilot and co-pilot survived but the aircraft was written off.

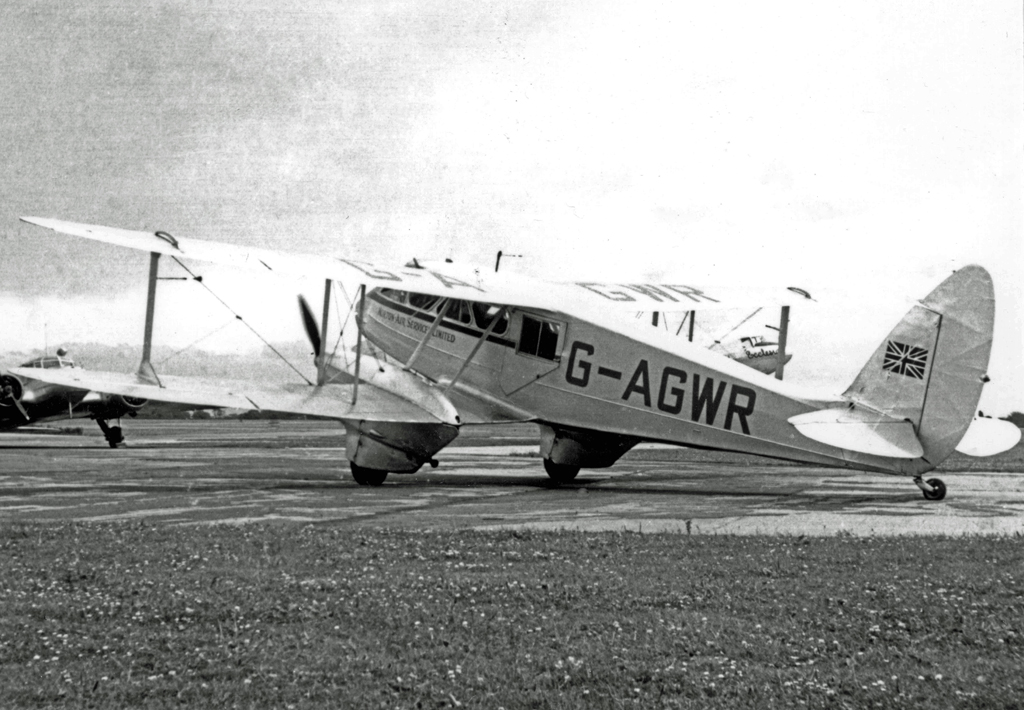
Rapide G-AGWR

(Jersey) In 1951 a de Havilland Dragon Rapide DH89A (registration: G-AGWR) operated by Morton Air Services, overshot the runway and ended up near the Airport boundary. The aircraft survived and was subsequently re-registered in Norway, and after that, in Sweden.

On 22 September 1953, a British European Airways Douglas C-47 Skytrain (registration: G-AGIZ) crashed into a hedge on landing at Guernsey Airport, no injuries.

(Guernsey) On 15 September 1954, a Royal Air Force Short Sunderland MR.5 (serial: PP122) hit a submerged rock on landing causing a rupture in the hull. It sank at Saint Peter Port.

On 2 November 1957, a Royal Air Force Vickers Valetta T.3 (serial: WJ470) hit an embankment and a building, causing the undercarriage to collapse on landing at Guernsey Airport.

On 15 August 1958, a Jersey Airlines de Havilland Heron (registration: G-AMYU) crash-landed on the grass next to the runway at Guernsey Airport and stopped on the road. Sole pilot was uninjured. Aircraft damaged beyond repair.

== 1960s ==
On 1 November 1961, a Silver City Airways Bristol Freighter coming from Cherbourg – Maupertus Airport crashed on aborting approach to Guernsey due to malfunctioning of the automatic pitch coarsening unit of the starboard propeller, killing the two pilots with the other 8 occupants surviving.

On 26 September 1963, a British United Air Ferries Bristol Superfreighter (registration:G-AMWA) overran runway 28 at Guernsey Airport after engine problems. None of the 3 crew and 1 passenger was injured but the aircraft was written off.

On 14 April 1965, British United Airways Flight 1030X Douglas Dakota (registration:G-ANTB) crashed near Jersey Airport after a flight from Paris, killing 27 passengers and crew of the 28 people on board.

On 26 August 1966, a private Piper PA-22-160, (registration:G-ARXK) stalled while turning on its final approach to the aerodrome, crashing into the sea, 200 yards from Alderney, where the pilot and two passengers drowned.

On 29 May 1969, a United States Air Force, Lockheed Hercules (serial: 63-7789) on an illegal flight that took off from RAF Mildenhall was allegedly shot down by two F-100 Super Sabre aircraft 30 miles north of Alderney, killing the only pilot.

== 1970s ==
On 6 August 1970, a Beagle B.206, (registration: G-AVAM) crashed at Corbière after taking off from Jersey Airport, killing the pilot.

On 24 December 1974, British Island Airways Flight 185, a Handley Page Dart Herald, (registration: G-BBXJ) was in a landing accident at Jersey Airport after a flight from Southampton. None of the 53 passengers and crew were harmed in the accident.

On 14 September 1975, a Vickers Viscount on a charter flight from East Midlands (registration: G-AZNH) made a heavy landing at Guernsey Airport that caused the nose wheel to collapse. None of the 78 passengers or crew were harmed.

== 1980s ==
On 1 October 1980, a private Cessna Citation (registration: G-BPCP) crashed on approach to Jersey Airport, killing the only pilot who was on a flight from Cardiff.

On 18 September 1981, a Jersey European Airways Flight 245 Britten-Norman Islander (registration: G-BDNP) on a flight from Jersey Airport to Guernsey Airport crashed on approach when one of the engines stopped. The pilot tried to land at Guernsey Airport but failed and then attempted to land in a field but crashed into a stone wall. None of the 9 passengers or crew were killed in the accident, however the pilot was badly injured. The pilot had intended to fly a version of the Islander with fuel tanks on the tips of the wings, but due to technical problems took another plane. Thus the engine ran out of fuel, stopped and caused the accident.

On 3 October 1981, a private fight Partenavia P.68 (registration: EC-DHE) on a flight from Cardiff Airport to Alicante–Elche Airport Aircraft was on a night IFR flight when one of the engines failed. Pilot could not maintain height and eventually crashed into the sea 5m SE off Guernsey. (The aircraft was never found) None of the 5 occupants survived.

On 16 September 1982, a private fight Wassmer WA-41 (reference: G-BAGM) crashed into the sea 20 miles north of Alderney

== 1990s ==
On 23 May 1995, a Brymon Airways De Havilland Canada Dash 8 (registration: G-BRYJ) tail struck the runway 27 at Jersey Airport. The incident caused some damage to the tail of the aircraft. None of the 4 crew and 44 passengers were injured in the incident.

On 7 December 1997, an AirUK F-27-500F (registration: G-BNCY) a flight from Southampton Airport to Guernsey Airport was involved in a landing accident at Guernsey Airport. The aircraft overran runway 27 while landing in high (34 kt) crosswinds and came to rest in an adjacent field with its left landing gear collapsed. There were no injuries among the 50 passengers and 4 crew. (The aircraft was damaged beyond repair and subsequently written off.)

On 12 June 1998, a private Piper PA-31 Navajo (registration: CN-TFP) on a flight from Tangier to Iceland. The pilot was going to refuel in France but kept on flying to Guernsey. As the aircraft was over the Channel islands the aircraft ran out of fuel and the pilot ditched the aircraft into the sea just north-west of Jersey. The accident killed the only pilot on the aircraft.

On 12 January 1999, a Channel Express F-27-600F (registration: G-CHNL) cargo flight from Luton Airport to Guernsey Airport was incorrectly loaded affecting centre of gravity, stalled on approach to the airport, crashed, and caught fire. The fire spread to two nearby homes, killing the pilots and injuring one person on the ground.

== 2000s ==
On 5 June 2001, a Channel Express cargo flight from Jersey Airport to Bournemouth Airport but just minutes after takeoff engine one caught fire. The Fokker F-27 Friendship landed back at Jersey and none of the 3 crew were injured.

On 13 October 2001, a Europa XS 912 light aircraft, (registration: G-BWGH) flying from Jersey Airport suffered engine failure and crash landed on Little Sark. The two occupants were uninjured. The aircraft was written off.

On 8 March 2006, a HS748 Series 2a (registration: G-BVOV) overran the runway at Guernsey Airport. There were no injuries. The cause of the accident was that the flight crew did not operate the propeller controls correctly, meaning that less drag was created than would have been had the controls been operated correctly. The aircraft body now rests in a quarry in Capernwray, Lancashire where it is used by divers.

On 23 August 2009, a private Piper Saratoga (registration: G-BTCA) crashed due to turbulence caused by nearby cliffs on approach to Alderney Airport. The pilot and 3 passengers sustained minor injuries.

== 2010s ==
On 12 November 2011, a Piper PA-28-181 Archer II (registration: G-BXRG) owned by Alderney Flying Training Ltd. ditched in the sea near the Casquettes, 25 miles northwest of Alderney. The reason for the accident is not known. Of the two occupants in the aircraft, the passenger was rescued by a merchant ship. The pilot has not been found.

On 27 March 2012, a Britten-Norman Trislander BN2A MK.III-2 (registration: G-BDTO) owned by Aurigny Air Services on a flight from Alderney Airport to Southampton suffered an engine failure, the aircraft returned safely to Alderney .

On 16 June 2012, an ATR 42 (registration: G-DRFC) owned by Blue Islands suffered an undercarriage failure on landing at Jersey Airport. No one was hurt but the aircraft was written off.

On 3 November 2013, a Britten-Norman Islander BN2B-21 (registration: G-CIAS) owned by Channel Islands Air Search on a search and rescue mission flight from Guernsey Airport suffered fuel problems resulting in a crash landing on the north coast of Jersey. There were no injuries.

On 17 June 2014, a Socata TB10 (registration: G-POPI) taking off from Guernsey Airport suffered a mechanical failure and struck a greenhouse shortly after becoming airborne. The aircraft was written off. There were no injuries.

On 21 January 2019, a Piper PA-46 (registration: N264DB) disappeared from radar screens and crashed near Les Casquets, 8 miles north-west of Alderney. Argentinian footballer Emiliano Sala was aboard the aircraft, which was flying from Nantes to Cardiff. The wreckage of the aircraft was found thirteen days later on the seabed at a depth of 220 feet (67 m). On 7 February, Sala's body was recovered from the wreckage. No trace of the pilot was found. Carbon monoxide may have been the cause. (Mar ‘22) Emiliano Sala died instantly from 'head and trunk injuries' and was 'deeply unconscious' when the plane crashed after breaking up mid-air, a jury has concluded.

== 2020s ==
On 23 April 2024 a De Havilland Canada Dash 8 (registration: 9H-LWB) on wet-lease to Aurigny from Luxwing arriving from London Gatwick overshot runway 27 when landing at Guernsey Airport. None of the 63 passengers and 4 crew were injured, disembarking the aircraft on the grass and being transported back to the terminal via bus; the aircraft itself was seemingly undamaged. The aerodrome was closed for two hours while crews attended to the aircraft, before being reopened for the later services, which had been delayed, to arrive. An investigation into the cause of the incident is being conducted.

On 23 May 2024 a Dornier 228 NG (registration: G-ETAC) operated by Aurigny from Alderney arriving into Guernsey suffered a hydraulic failure shortly after landing. This resulted in the aerodrome closing for roughly 40 minutes. None of the 17 passengers or crew were injured.
