= 544th Bombardment Squadron =

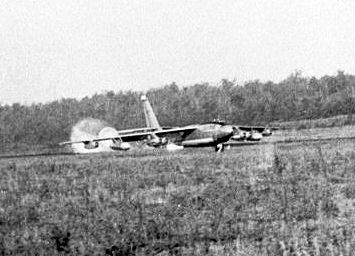
- 384th Bombardment Wing B-47 Stratojet landing at Little Rock AFB
- Active: 1942–1946; 1947–1949; 1955–1964
- Country: United States
- Branch: United States Air Force
- Role: Medium bomber
- Engagements: European Theater of Operations
- Decorations: Distinguished Unit Citation; Air Force Outstanding Unit Award

Insignia
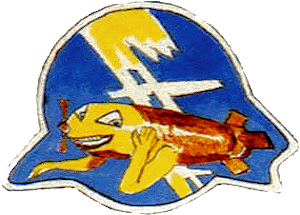
- 544th Bombardment Squadron emblem
- World War II fuselage code: SU

The 544th Bombardment Squadron is an inactive United States Air Force unit. It was last assigned to the 384th Bombardment Wing at Little Rock Air Force Base, Arkansas, where it was inactivated on 1 September 1964.

The squadron was first activated during World War II as a heavy bomber unit. After training in the United States, it moved to England, where it participated in the strategic bombing campaign against Germany. It earned two Distinguished Unit Citations during combat over Europe. It remained in Europe after V-E Day, and was inactivated in France in 1946. The squadron was again active in the reserve from 1947 to 1949, but does not appear to have been fully manned or equipped.

The squadron was activated by Strategic Air Command at Little Rock in 1955, and served as part of SAC's strategic deterrent force until inactivating as SAC phased out the Boeing B-47 Stratojet.

== History ==
=== World War II ===
==== Activation and training ====
The squadron was first organized at Gowen Field, Idaho on 1 December 1942 as one of the original four squadrons of the 384th Bombardment Group. It moved the next month to Wendover Field, Utah, where it began training with the Boeing B-17 Flying Fortress. It completed training in May 1943, and began its move to the European Theater of Operations. The ground echelon departed Sioux City Army Air Base, Iowa, for the port of embarkation at Camp Kilmer, New Jersey, on 10 May and sailed on the RMS Queen Elizabeth on 23 May 1943. The air echelon staged through Kearney Army Air Field, Nebraska, starting on 3 May and ferried their B-17s via the northern ferry route. The first planes arrived at RAF Grafton Underwood on 25 May 1943.

==== Combat in Europe ====
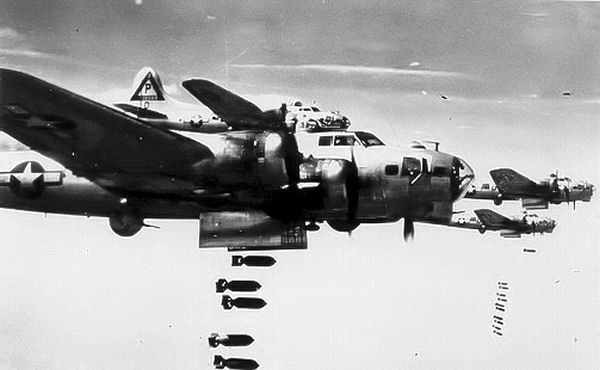
384th Group B-17s attacking a target

The squadron arrived at its combat station, RAF Grafton Underwood on 6 June 1943. It flew its first mission on 23 June, a diversionary strike against the Ford and General Motors plants at Antwerp. The squadron primarily flew missions in the strategic bombing campaign against Germany, striking air bases and industrial targets in France and Germany. Targets included Orleans/Bricy and Nancy/Azelot Airfields, an engine manufacturing factory at Cologne, a coke distillation facility at Gelsenkirchen, an aircraft component plant at Halberstadt, a steel manufacturing plant at Magdeburg and the ball bearing factory at Schweinfurt.

The squadron participated in a raid on aircraft factories in Germany on 11 January 1944 for which it was awarded a Distinguished Unit Citation (DUC). This was a prelude to Big Week, a concentrated series of raids by Eighth Air Force, aimed at destroying Germany's aircraft manufacturing industry in late February. On 24 April 1944, the 384th Group, although crippled by heavy losses, led the 41st Bombardment Wing, in an attack on the Dornier Flugzeugwerke aircraft manufacturing plant at Oberpfaffenhofen, pressing the attack through almost overwhelming opposition. One group commander described the opposition on this mission as the heaviest he had seen during the war. This mission resulted in the award of a second DUC to the squadron. Other strategic targets included communications centers, oil refineries and storage facilities at Leipzig and Berlin, marshalling yards at Duren and Mannheim, and port facilities.

The squadron was occasionally diverted from the strategic bombing campaign to fly air support and interdiction missions. It attacked targets along the coast of Normandy to support Operation Overlord, continuing these attacks through D-Day, when it attacked airfields and communications facilities beyond the beachhead. On 24 and 25 July 1944, it supported Operation Cobra, the breakout at Saint Lo with attacks on enemy strong points just beyond enemy lines. It hit armor and artillery concentrations near Eindhoven to support Operation Market Garden, the attempt to seize a bridgehead across the Rhine in the Netherlands during September 1944. It attacked enemy fortifications and communications during the Battle of the Bulge from December 1944 through January 1945. When the Allies attacked across the Rhine in Germany in March 1945, it attacked rail facilities, including marshalling yards and bridges to cut enemy supply lines.

The squadron flew its last combat mission on 25 April 1945. After V-E Day the squadron remained in Europe as part of United States Air Forces in Europe. It assisted Air Transport Command in the Green Project by flying soldiers to Casablanca, French Morocco for transport back to the United States. From its continental base at Istres Air Base, France, it flew Greek military back to their homeland, and transported displaced persons. The squadron transported American troops to Germany to serve in the military occupation forces there, but was gradually drawn down. It was inactivated in France in February 1946 and its remaining personnel and equipment were absorbed by the 306th Bombardment Group.

=== Air Force reserve ===
The squadron was activated in the reserve at Nashville Municipal Airport, Tennessee in July 1947. The unit's training was initially supervised by Air Defense Command. In 1948 Continental Air Command assumed responsibility for managing reserve and Air National Guard units from ADC. Although it does not appear that the unit was fully manned or equipped at this time, President Truman's reduced 1949 defense budget also required reductions in the number of units in the Air Force, and the 544th was inactivated, as reserve flying operations at Nashville ceased

=== Strategic bomber operations ===
The squadron was activated at Little Rock Air Force Base, Arkansas in August 1955. However, it was minimally manned and did not begin to receive its Boeing B-47 Stratojets until the following year. The squadron began to train in its intercontinental bombing mission in February 1956. As part of Operation Reflex, the squadron deployed to RAF Brize Norton from 3 January to 5 April 1957. Reflex placed Stratojets and Boeing KC-97s at bases closer to the Soviet Union for 90 day periods, although individuals rotated back to home bases during unit Reflex deployments

From 1958, the Stratojet wings of Strategic Air Command (SAC) began to assume an alert posture at their home bases, reducing the amount of time spent on alert at overseas bases. General Thomas S. Power’s initial goal was to maintain one third of SAC's planes on fifteen minute ground alert, fully fueled and ready for combat to reduce vulnerability to a Soviet missile strike. The alert commitment was increased to half the squadron's aircraft in 1962.

During the 1962 Cuban Missile Crisis, The squadron's B-47s dispersed on 22 October. Most dispersal bases were civilian airfields with reserve or Air National Guard units. The B-47s were configured for execution of the Emergency War Order as soon as possible after dispersal. On 24 October SAC went to DEFCON 2, placing all the squadron's aircraft on alert. As tensions began to ease, on 15 November 1/6 of the dispersed B-47s were recalled to their home bases. On 21 November SAC relaxed its readiness status to DEFCON 3. The squadron's remaining dispersed B-47s were recalled to home base on 24 November. On 27 November SAC returned to normal alert posture.

However, SAC was phasing the B-47 out of its nuclear delivery forces and the squadron was inactivated along with its parent wing on 1 September 1964.

== Lineage ==
- Constituted as the 544th Bombardment Squadron (Heavy) on 25 November 1942

Activated on 1 December 1942
Redesignated 544th Bombardment Squadron, Heavy on 20 August 1943
Inactivated on 28 February 1946
Redesignated 544th Bombardment Squadron, Very Heavy on 9 July 1947
Activated in the reserve on 16 July 1947
Inactivated on 27 June 1949
Redesignated 544th Bombardment Squadron, Medium on 3 June 1955
Activated on 1 August 1955
Discontinued and inactivated on 1 September 1964

=== Assignments ===
- 384th Bombardment Group, 1 December 1942 – 28 February 1946
- 384th Bombardment Group, 16 July 1947 – 27 June 1949
- 384th Bombardment Wing, 1 August 1955 – 1 September 1964

=== Stations ===
- Gowen Field, Idaho, 1 December 1942
- Wendover Field, Utah, 2 January 1943
- Sioux City Army Air Base, Iowa, 3 April–10 May 1943
- RAF Grafton Underwood (Station 106), England, 4 June 1943
- Istres Air Base (Station 196) (Y-17), France, 22 June 1945 – 28 February 1946
- Nashville Municipal Airport, Tennessee, 16 July 1947 – 27 June 1949
- Little Rock Air Force Base, Arkansas, 1 August 1955 – 1 September 1964

=== Aircraft ===
- Boeing B-17 Flying Fortress, 1942–1946
- Boeing B-47 Stratojet, 1956–1964

=== Awards and campaigns ===
Award streamer	Award	Dates	Notes
	Distinguished Unit Citation	Germany, 11 January 1944	
	Distinguished Unit Citation	Germany, 24 April 1944	
	Air Force Outstanding Unit Award	14 February 1957-31 December 1957	

Campaign Streamer	Campaign	Dates	Notes
	Air Offensive, Europe	4 June 1943 – 5 June 1944	
	Air Combat, EAME Theater	4 June 1943 – 11 May 1945	
	Normandy	6 June 1944 – 24 July 1944	
	Northern France	25 July 1944 – 14 September 1944	
	Rhineland	15 September 1944 – 21 March 1945	
	Ardennes-Alsace	16 December 1944 – 25 January 1945	
	Central Europe	22 March 1944 – 21 May 1945	

== See also ==
- B-17 Flying Fortress units of the United States Army Air Forces
- List of B-47 units of the United States Air Force
