= RAF Grafton Underwood =

Former RAF station in Northamptonshire, England

RAF Grafton Underwood USAAF Station 106
- Located Near Kettering, Northamptonshire, England
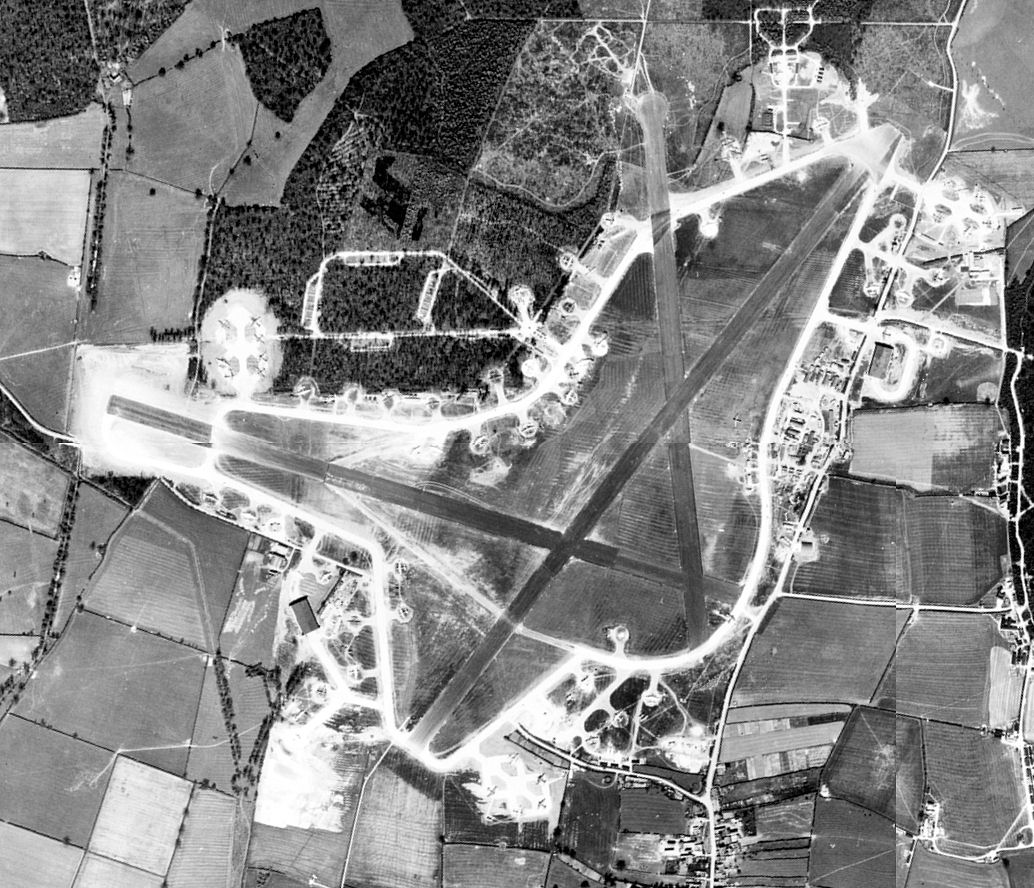
- Aerial photograph of Grafton Underwood airfield. The bomb dump is to the north of the perimeter track on the west side of the airfield. 22 April 1944. Note the large number of 384th Bomb Group B-17s on hardstands.

Site information
- Type: Royal Air Force station
- Code: GU
- Controlled by: Royal Air Force; United States Army Air Forces

Location
- RAF Grafton Underwood shown within Northamptonshire (grid reference SP920810)
- Coordinates: 52°25′15″N 000°38′59″W

Site history
- Built: 1941
- In use: 1941–1959
- Battles/wars: European Theatre of World War II; Air Offensive, Europe July 1942 – May 1945

Garrison information
- Garrison: RAF Bomber Command; Eighth Air Force

Royal Air Force Grafton Underwood or more simply RAF Grafton Underwood is a former Royal Air Force station located 4 miles (6.4 km) northeast of Kettering, Northamptonshire, England.

== Royal Air Force use ==
The airfield at Grafton Underwood was opened in 1941 and was first used by the RAF Bomber Command No. 1653 Heavy Conversion Unit RAF with Consolidated Liberators. The original runways were approximately 1,600 yards and 1,100 yards in length. However, these were unsuitable for the operation of heavy, four-engined bombers and the field was upgraded to Class A airfield standards, including the lengthening of the runways to the required 2,000 yards for the main and 1,400 yards for each of the others, started in late 1942.

== United States Army Air Forces use ==
Grafton Underwood was assigned United States Army Air Forces Eighth Air Force in 1942. Its designation was USAAF Station 106.

USAAF Station Units assigned to RAF Grafton Underwood were:

- 443d Sub-Depot
- 18th Weather Squadron
- 33rd Station Complement Squadron

Regular Army Station Units included:

- 1119th Quartermaster Company
- 1140th Military Police Company
- 1774th Ordnance Supply & Maintenance Company
- 854th Chemical Company
- 2023rd Engineer Fire Fighting Platoon
- 203rd Finance Section

=== 15th Bombardment Squadron (Light) ===
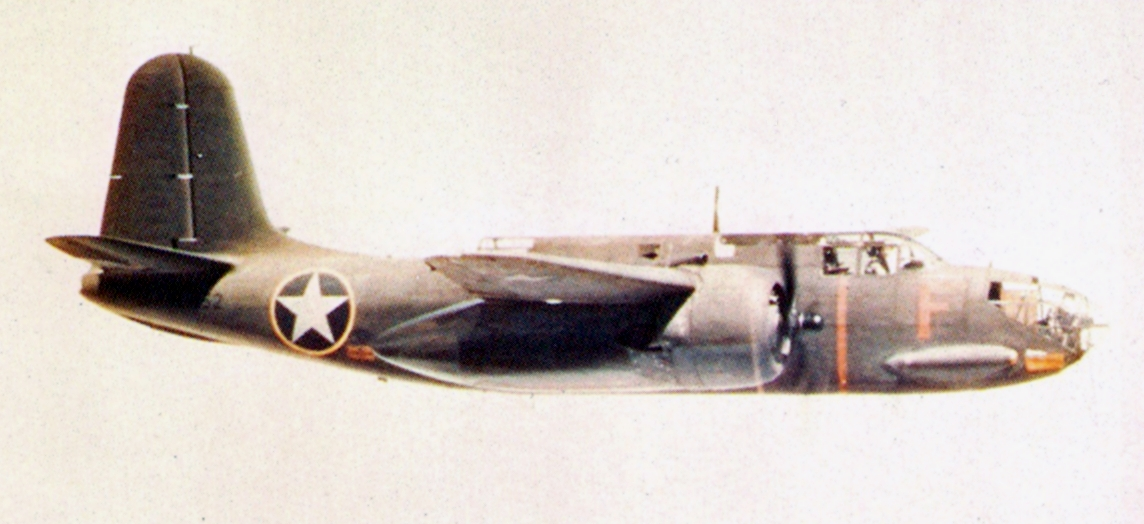
A U.S. Army Air Forces Douglas Boston III from the 15th Bombardment Squadron (Light) in flight in late 1942. The 15th BS was the first USAAF unit in action in Europe.

The first United States Army Air Forces Eighth Air Force tenant on Grafton Underwood was the 15th Bombardment Squadron, arriving on 12 May 1942 from Batchelor, Australia. The squadron flew the British Boston III light bomber. The 15th was originally part of the 27th Bombardment Group (Light), based in the Philippine Islands, however the group's planes (A-24s), did not arrive by 7 December 1941. Due to the deteriorating situation in the Philippines after the Japanese attack, they were diverted to Australia where they reformed into a combat unit and fought in the Dutch East Indies and New Guinea campaigns.

When the 27th Bombardment Group was inactivated and transferred back to the United States for re-equipping, the surviving members of the group were first transferred back to the United States, then to the UK.

At the time Grafton Underwood was lacking many facilities, and the squadron moved to RAF Molesworth in mid June.

=== 97th Bombardment Group (Heavy) ===
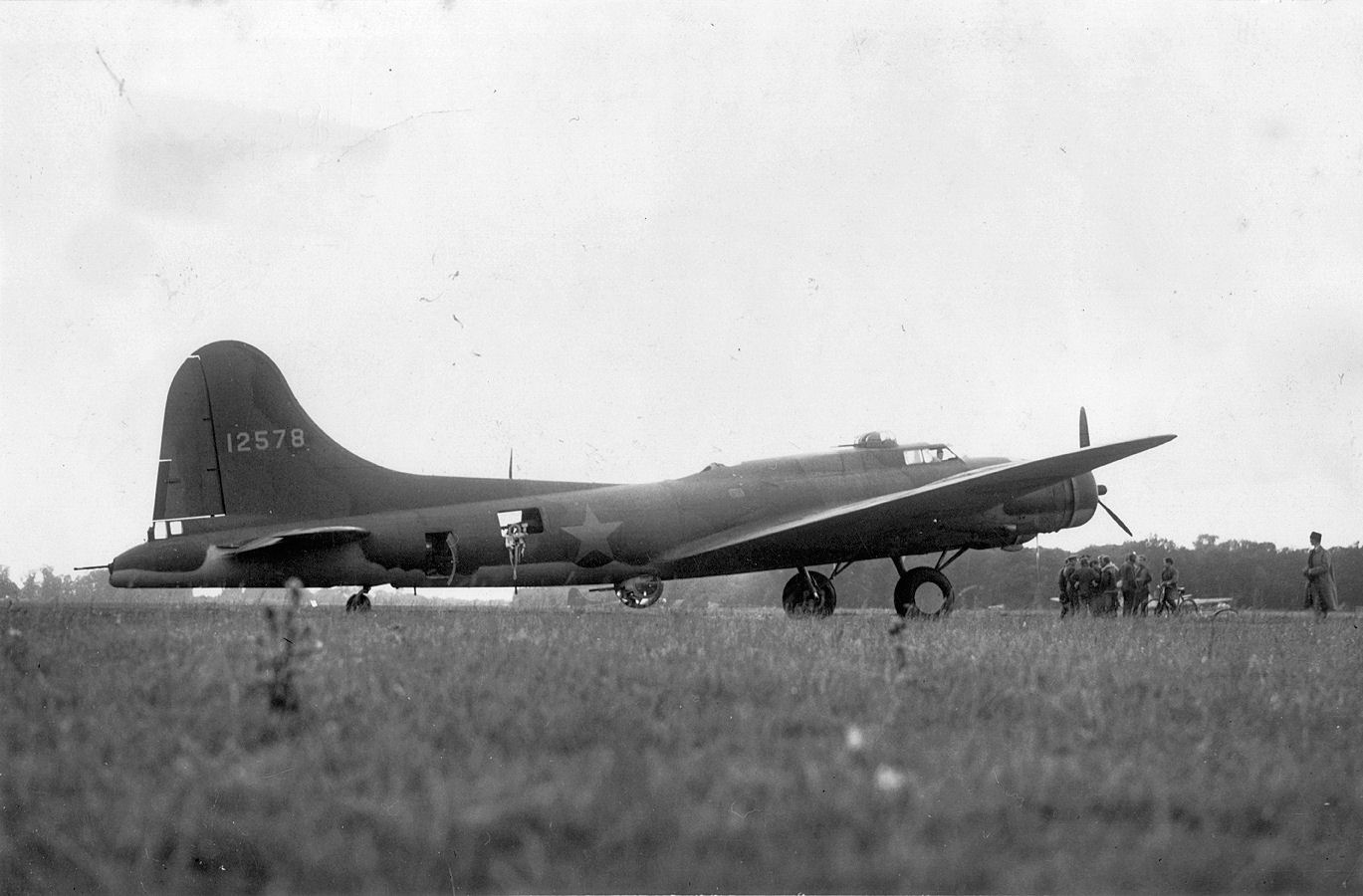
A B-17E Flying Fortress (serial number 41-2578) nicknamed "Butcher Shop" of the 97th Bomb Group, 17 August 1942

The ground echelons of the 97th Bombardment Group, having sailed from the New York port of embarkation aboard HMS Queen Elizabeth on 4 June 1942, arrived at Gourock, Scotland on 10 June 1942. After disembarking the following day, they travelled by train and then by truck to Northamptonshire, and soon they arrived at their respective RAF airfields on 12 June 1942. The 97th Bomb Group Headquarters personnel and the 340th and 341st Bomb Squadron ground personnel went to RAF Polebrook. The 342d and 414th Bomb Squadron ground personnel went to RAF Grafton Underwood. On 6 July 1942 a 97th Bombardment Group flight echelon from two Boeing B-17E Flying Fortress Bomb Squadrons (four B-17Es each from the 342d and the 414th), which had been held up at Goose Bay by bad weather, arrived at their assigned RAF base in England (Grafton Underwood) and rejoined their ground echelon. The newcomers found their old comrades, after almost a month abroad, adept at calculations in shillings and pence, and authorities on other peculiarities on life in England.

The first 97th Bombardment Group Flying Fortresses reached Prestwick on 6 July when 41–9017, 41–9019, 41–9023, 41–9024, 41–9026, 41–9042, 41-9103 and 41-9115 arrived. These eight Flying Fortresses from the 342d and 414th Bomb Squadrons were the first 97th Bomb Group B-17s to arrive at their assigned RAF base, and arrived the same day (6 July 1942) at Grafton Underwood detailed as follows:

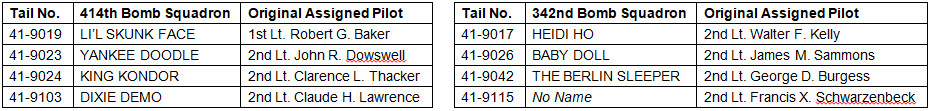

Both RAF Polebrook Peterborough and Grafton Underwood airfields were originally built as two-squadron bases. Consequently, the 97th Bombardment Group had to operate out of two separate RAF bases until the Polebrook facility was upgraded to support a full four-squadron bomb group. On 8 September 1942 the 342d and 414th Bomb Squadrons relocated from Grafton Underwood to Polebrook.

The 97th Bomb Group is famous for flying the first all-American Flying Fortress bombing mission against German-occupied territory in Europe on 17 August 1942, attacking the railway marshalling yards at Sotteville-lès-Rouen in France. The lead aircraft in the first flight group of six B-17s was Butcher Shop, which was piloted by the Group Commander Colonel Frank A. Armstrong, and copiloted by the squadron commander of the 340th Captain Paul W. Tibbets (who later flew the Enola Gay to Hiroshima Japan on the first atomic bomb mission). The lead aircraft in the second flight group of six B-17s was B-17E Yankee Doodle 41-9023, which was copiloted by 2nd Lt. John R. Dowswell and piloted by Captain Rudolph Emil "Rudy" Flack, the squadron commander of the 414th, Grafton Underwood base commander and mission commander, and who carried Brig. General Ira C. Eaker, the commander of the VIII Bomber Command, as an observer on board his Flying Fortress.

From 17 August 1942 to 21 October 1942 the 97th Bombardment Group flew 16 officially numbered bombing missions (and two off-book missions) and attacked airfields, marshalling yards, industries, naval installations and other targets in France, Belgium and Holland. Next, the 97th Bombardment Group was transferred to the Twelfth Air Force in the Mediterranean theatre. For the most detailed account of the activities of the 97th Bombardment Group from the 414th Bomb Squadron first commanding officer's perspective from February 1942 to 5 March 1943, refer to the following book's Chapter 7 (Fast Track Training for Overseas Assignment 1942), Chapter 8 (Combat Missions in Europe with the Eighth Air Force 1942) and Chapter 9 (Combat Missions in North Africa with the 12th Air Force 1942–43), which is freely available to download and view the latest version of the book via this Facebook link: https://www.facebook.com/Untold-Stories-of-Colonel-Rudy-Flack-302118180261150/. Via this Facebook link simply look for the latest posting of the book's Appendix, which includes many appendices. One appendix in particular titled "Appendix T – The Hour Has Come – The 97th Bomb Group in World War II book" is a high-resolution scanned copy, which has been saved as a searchable PDF document and freely available to download and view via the following OneDrive link: https://1drv.ms/b/s!Ap83jlCuE2S-g4QbDuUQw291nq7tEQ?e=yNgDc3.

Last, the 97th Bombardment Group was transferred to the 15th Air Force and went on to lead a number of secret and daring missions all over Europe.

=== 305th Bombardment Group (Heavy) ===
The 305th Bombardment Group (Heavy), arrived from Muroc AAF, California during September 1942, replacing the 97th. The Group was assigned to the 40th Combat Wing at RAF Thurleigh. The group tail code was a 'Triangle G'. Its operational squadrons were:

- 364th Bombardment Squadron (B-17F) (WF)
- 365th Bombardment Squadron (B-17F) (XK)
- 366th Bombardment Squadron (B-17F) (KY)
- 422d Bombardment Squadron (B-17F) (JJ)

At Grafton Underwood, the group began combat on 17 November 1942 and attacked such targets as submarine pens, docks, harbours, shipyards, motor works, and marshaling yards in France, Germany, and the Low Countries.

During December 1942, the group was transferred to RAF Chelveston.

=== 96th Bombardment Group (Heavy) ===
The next Eighth Air Force heavy bomb group to arrive was the 96th Bombardment Group (Heavy) which flew in from Pyote AAF Texas in the latter part of April 1943.

The 96th Bombardment Group was assigned to the 45th Combat Bombardment Wing of the 3rd Bombardment Division. Its tail code was 'Square-C'. The group consisted of the following squadrons:

- 337th Bombardment Squadron (AX)
- 338th Bombardment Squadron (BX)
- 339th Bombardment Squadron (QJ)
- 413th Bombardment Squadron (MJ)

This group commenced combat operations on 14 May but, as it was assigned to the 45th Wing with a general base area in north Essex, the 96th moved east at the end of May to RAF Andrews Field.

=== 384th Bombardment Group (Heavy) ===
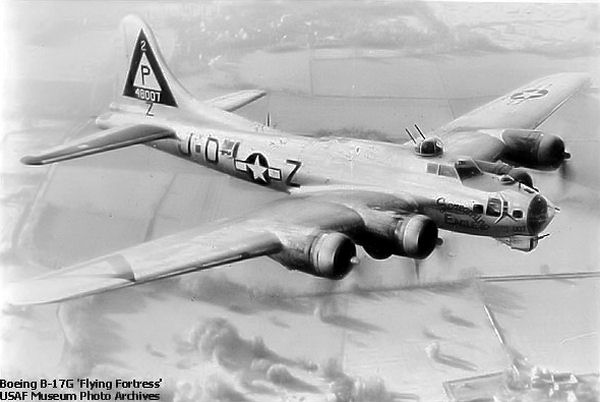
B-17G-45-VE Fortress Serial 44-8007 "Screaming Eagle" of the 545th Bomb Squadron

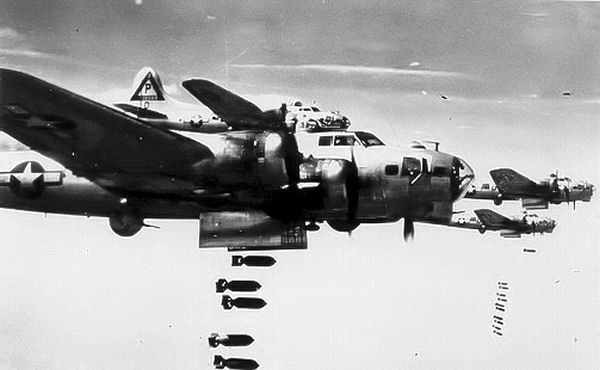
B-17s of the 384th Bomb Group on a bomb run

From May 1943 until June 1945 384th Bombardment Group (Heavy) used Grafton Underwood, arriving from Sioux City AAF, Iowa.

The 384th was assigned to the 41st Combat Bombardment Wing of the 1st Bombardment Division. Its tail code was 'Triangle-P'. its operational B-17 Flying Fortress squadrons were:

- 544th Bombardment Squadron (SU)
- 545th Bombardment Squadron (JD)
- 546th Bombardment Squadron (BK)
- 547th Bombardment Squadron (SO)

The 384th Bomb Group primarily as a strategic bombardment organisation, concentrating its attacks on airfields and industries in France and Germany.

The Group's targets included aerodromes at Orléans, Bricy, and Nancy; motor works at Cologne; arms manufacturers at Solingen; a coking plant at Gelsenkirchen; an aircraft component parts factory at Halberstadt; steel works at Magdeburg; and ball-bearing plants at Schweinfurt. The Group made a damaging raid on aircraft factories in central Germany on 11 January 1944 and received a Distinguished Unit Citation for the action.

The 384th took part in the campaign of heavy bombers against the German aircraft industry during Big Week, 20–25 February 1944. Received another DUC for the mission of 24 April 1944 when the group, although crippled by heavy losses of men and planes, led the 41st Bomb Wing through almost overwhelming opposition to attack an aircraft factory and airfield at Oberpfaffenhofen. The group also bombed ports, communications centres, oil facilities, and cities, attacking such targets as oil storage plants in Leipzig and Berlin, ports at Hamburg and Emden, and marshalling yards at Duren and Mannheim.

At times the Group flew interdictory and support missions. Attacked installations along the coast of Normandy prior to and during the invasion in June 1944 and then bombed airfields and communications beyond the beachhead. Supported ground troops during the breakthrough at Saint-Lô, 24–25 July, by bombing enemy strong points just beyond Allied lines. Hit tank and gun concentrations north of Eindhoven to assist the airborne assault on the Netherlands in September. Struck enemy communications and fortifications during the Battle of the Bulge, December 1944 – January 1945. Aided the Allied assault across the Rhine in March 1945 by attacking marshalling yards, railway junctions, and bridges to cut off enemy supplies.

After V-E Day, the 384th remained in France after the war as part of United States Air Forces in Europe. Carried American soldiers to Casablanca for return to the US, returned Greek soldiers to their homeland, and moved Allied troops to Germany. The 384th Bomb Group was inactivated at Istres France on 28 February 1946.

==== In popular culture ====
In the 1945 film The Way to the Stars, footage of B-17 Flying Fortresses from the 384th landing and taking off in April and May 1945 was filmed at RAF Grafton Underwood. One of the 384th's aircrew recorded in his diary seeing B-17s of the 384th and ground scenes being filmed at Grafton Underwood.

==== Legacy ====
The 384th was a United States Air Force front-line Strategic Air Command unit (1955–1994) under various designations during the Cold War. Upon activation in 1955, the 384th Bombardment Wing was bestowed the lineage, legacy and honours of the USAAF World War II 384th Bomb Group.

The wing was equipped with B-47 Bombers at Little Rock AFB Arkansas until 1964, then reassigned and reequipped with and KC-135 aerial tankers at McConnell AFB, Kansas as the 384th Air Refueling Wing. Beginning in 1987, the wing was redesignated as the 384th Bombardment Wing, Heavy and was reequipped with the North American Rockwell B-1B "Lancer" at McConnell.

The wing was inactivated by Air Combat Command on 1 October 1994 after almost 40 years of active duty.

== Postwar Air Ministry use ==
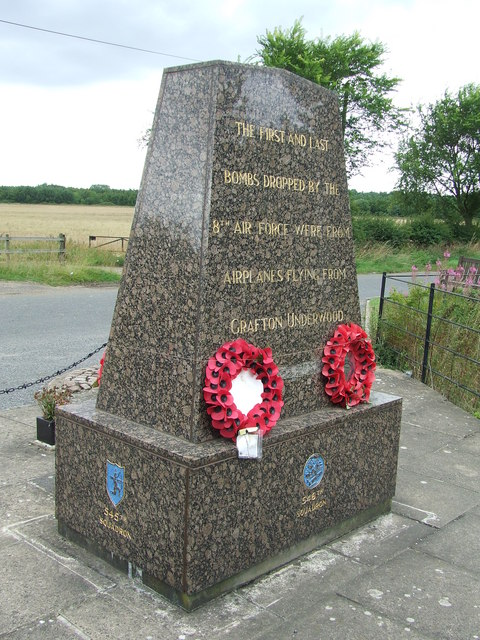
Memorial to USAAF Grafton Underwood

After the war, Grafton Underwood was used for vehicle storage with No. 236 Maintenance Unit employing up to two hundred civilian drivers and mechanics. The unit at the airfield repaired and stored thousands of Air Ministry vehicles which were sold at monthly public auctions. The airfield was finally declared surplus to requirements and closed on 1 February 1959.

== Current use ==
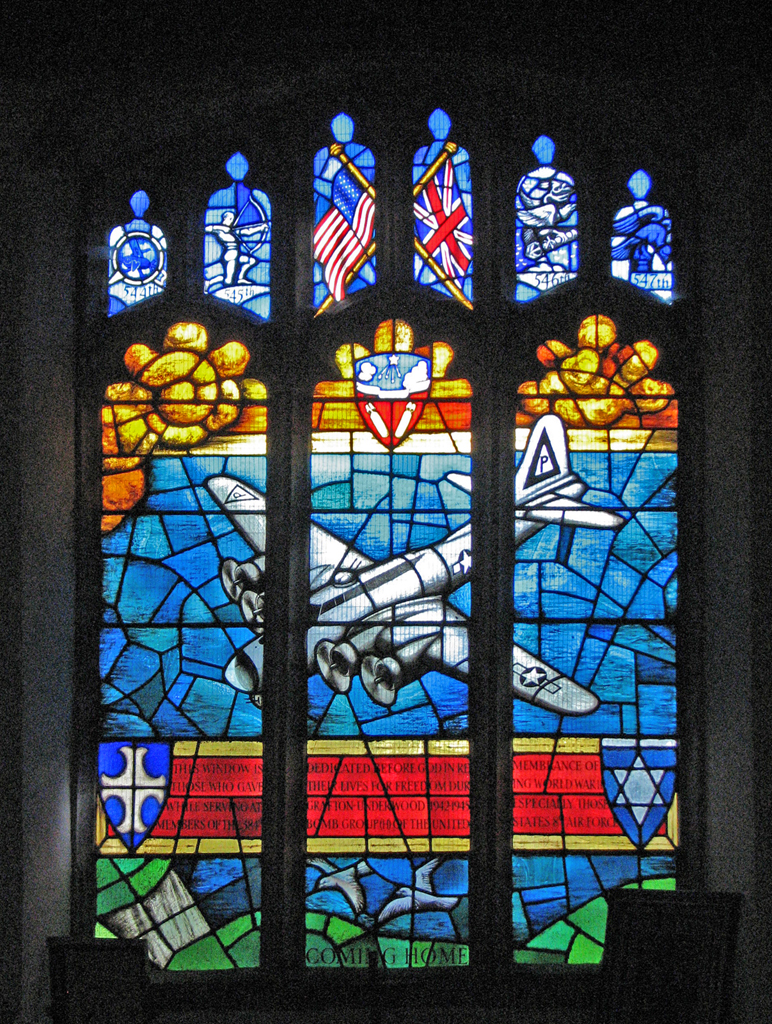
USAAF memorial window (1977) by Brian Thomas in the parish church of Grafton Underwood

With the end of military control, Grafton Underwood airfield was returned to agricultural use, however some old buildings remain, in varying condition. Most of the concreted area of the airfield has been removed, except for some single-track agricultural roads which were part of the perimeter track and runways. Several frying pan and at least one double-loop hardstand remains on the north side of the airfield on private farmland. Woods now cover much of the site and these are open to the public. A memorial was installed at the airfield site in the 1990s.

A memorial was created in the mid-1980s; this was then updated a few years later.

A stained-glass USAAF memorial window was erected in St James's Church, Grafton Underwood.

The site is also now used for single venue (rally) motor-sport events at least once a year. The event is named "The Flying Fortress stages" as a tribute to its use in World War II.

== See also ==
- List of former Royal Air Force stations
