= 41st Bombardment Wing =

41st Combat Bombardment Wing
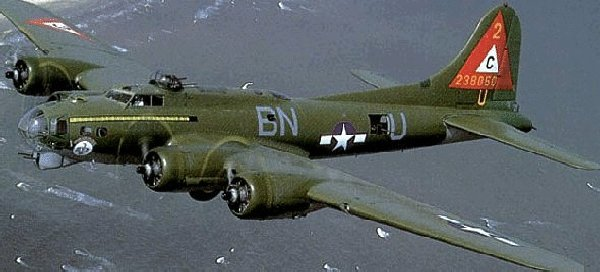
- Wing B-17 Flying Fortress (Note: Airplane is Boeing B-17G-75-BO Flying Fortress, serial 43-38050 of the 359th Bombardment Squadron.)
- Active: 1943 - 1945
- Country: United States
- Branch: United States Air Force
- Role: Command of heavy bomber forces
- Engagements: European Theater of Operations
- Decorations: Distinguished Unit Citation

Commanders
- Notable commanders: Robert F. Travis

The 41st Combat Bombardment Wing is a disbanded United States Air Force unit. It was organized in February 1943 as the 41st Bombardment Wing. After organizing and training in the United States, it moved to England as an element of VIII Bomber Command. It took over the resources of a provisional wing in September 1943 and engaged in the strategic bombing campaign against Germany until V-E Day, earning a Distinguished Unit Citation. In June 1945, its component groups were reassigned and it was disbanded.

== History ==
the wing was activated at Salt Lake City Army Air Base, Utah in February 1943 as the 41st Bombardment Wing. The following month it moved to Rapid City Army Air Base, South Dakota, where it organized and trained until July, when it moved to the European Theater of Operations.

Shortly after its arrival at Brampton Grange, in August 1943 it was redesignated the 41st Combat Bombardment Wing. In September, it moved to RAF Molesworth and received its combat components and began operations. In addition to the 303rd Bombardment Group at Molesworth, this included the 379th Bombardment Group at RAF Kimbolton and the 384th Bombardment Group at RAF Grafton Underwood. These groups had been previously attached to the 103rd Combat Bombardment Wing (Provisional). The 103rd had been organized in May 1943 to provide tactical control over the number of groups (two or three) that made up the "wing" combat formations. (Note: The regular wings of VIII Bomber Command had grown to control as many as a dozen groups.)

On 11 January 1944, the wing conducted a raid on aircraft factories in central Germany, including an aircraft assembly plant at Oschersleben for which it was awarded a Distinguished Unit Citation. Adverse weather prevented American fighter escorts from protecting the wing's groups, exposing them to continuous attack by enemy interceptors.

To attack targets from outside the range of flak defenses, the Army Air Forces had experimented with glide bombs, including a 2,000 pounds (910 kg) high explosive bomb with wooden wings and empennage. The wing's groups were given the task of using the weapon in a trial 0n 28 May 1944, with the glide bombs mounted on racks beneath the wings of their B-17s. They attacked a marshalling yard at Eifeltor, near Köln, which was selected as a large target. The wing released 109 bombs, but only a few glided into the intended target, while others exploded miles away. As a result of this failure, VIII Bomber Command recommended that no more of the bombs be procured.

The wing continued combat operations until shortly before V-E Day. In June 1945, its components were reassigned, with the 303rd and 379th Bombardment Groups moving to Cazes Field, Morocco, where they were assigned to the North African Division, Air Transport Command for participation in the Green Project. The 384th Bombardment Group moved to Istres Airfield, France, where it also participated in the Green Project, but was programmed to become part of the occupation forces. The wing was then disbanded on 18 June 1945.

== Lineage ==
- Constituted as the 41st Bombardment Wing (Heavy) on 29 January 1943

Activated on 16 February 1943
Redesignated 41st Combat Bombardment Wing (Heavy) c. 30 August 1943
Disbanded on 18 June 1945

=== Assignments ===
- Second Air Force, 16 February 1943
- VIII Bomber Command (later Eighth Air Force), 26 July 1943
- 1st Bombardment Division (later 1st Air Division), 13 September 1943 – 18 June 1945

=== Components ===
- 303d Bombardment Group: 13 September 1943 – 15 June 1945
- 379th Bombardment Group: 16 September 1943 – 16 June 1945
- 384th Bombardment Group: 13 September 1943 – 16 June 1945

=== Stations ===
- Salt Lake City Army Air Base, Utah, 16 February 1943
- Rapid City Army Air Base, South Dakota, March – c. 4 July 1943
- Brampton Grange (AAF-103), England, c. 26 July 1943
- RAF Molesworth (AAF-107), England, c. 16 September 1943 – 18 June 1945

=== Awards and Campaigns ===
Award streamer	Award	Dates	Notes
	Distinguished Unit Citation	11 January 1944	41st Combat Bombardment Wing

Campaign Streamer	Campaign	Dates	Notes
	Air Offensive, Europe	c. 26 July 1943–5 June 1944	41st Combat Bombardment Wing
	Normandy	6 June 1944–24 July 1944	41st Combat Bombardment Wing
	Northern France	25 July 1944–14 September 1944	41st Combat Bombardment Wing
	Rhineland	15 September 1944–21 March 1945	41st Combat Bombardment Wing
	Ardennes-Alsace	16 December 1944–25 January 1945	41st Combat Bombardment Wing
	Central Europe	22 March 1944–21 May 1945	41st Combat Bombardment Wing

== See also ==
- B-17 Flying Fortress units of the United States Army Air Forces
