= 384th Air Expeditionary Group =

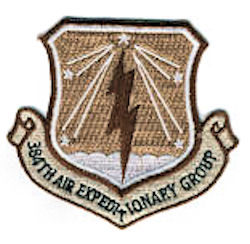
- Emblem of the 384th Bombardment Group
- Active: 1991–1994; 2003
- Country: United States
- Branch: United States Air Force
- Part of: Air Combat Command

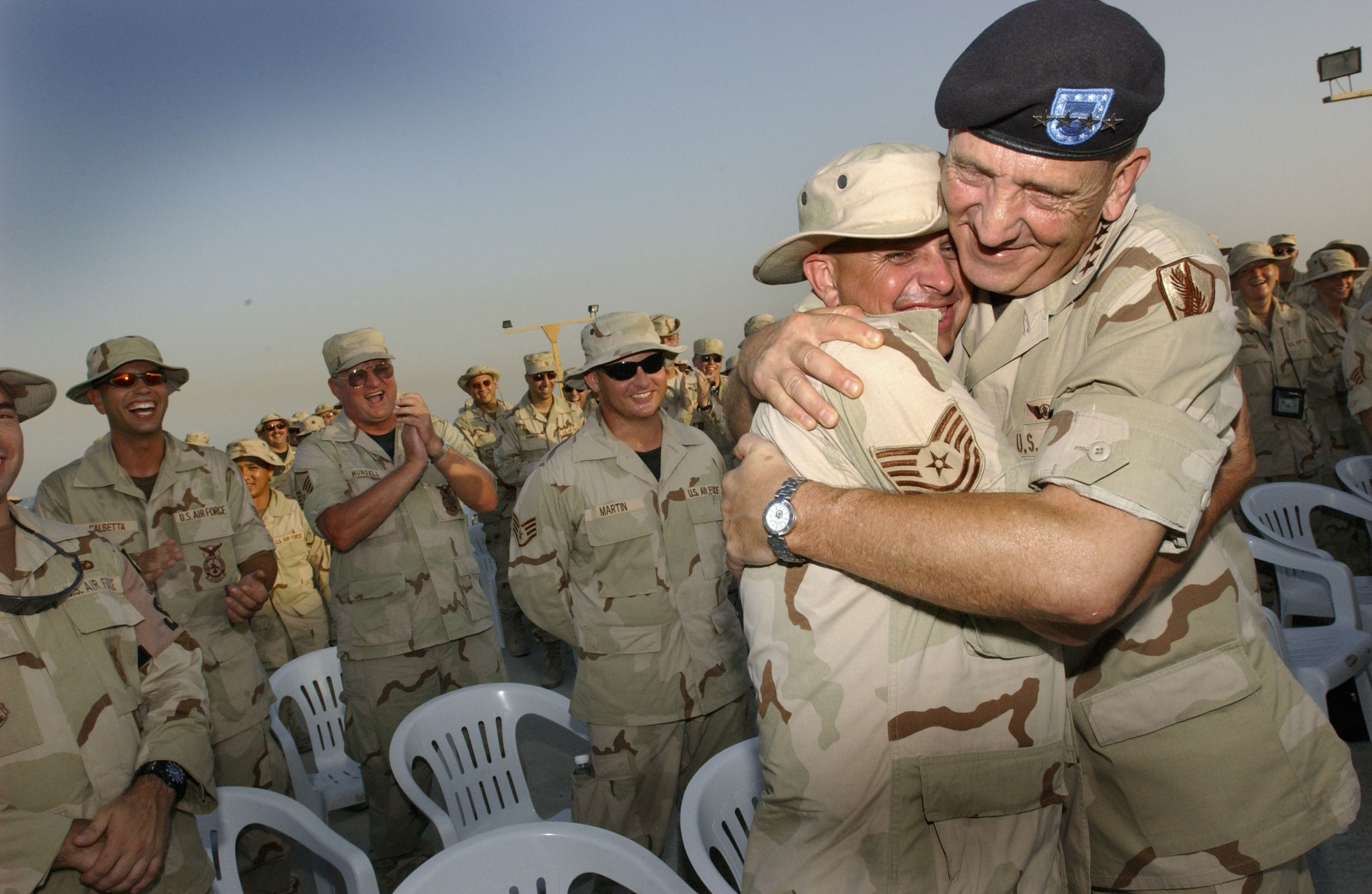
Gen. Tommy R. Franks, commander in chief, U.S. Central Command, embraces Tech. Sgt. Dan Fowler after addressing the troops of the 384th Air Expeditionary Group

The 384th Air Expeditionary Group is a provisional United States Air Force unit assigned to the Air Combat Command. The group may be activated or inactivated at any time.

It was first organized at McConnell Air Force Base, Kansas as the operational element of the 384th Wing, inactivating in 1994 as the bomber force at McConnell was drawing down. Its last active assignment was with to the United States Central Command Air Forces at Shaikh Isa Air Base, Bahrain. It was inactivated on 3 September 2003.

== History ==
On 1 September 1991, the 384th Operations Group was activated at McConnell Air Force Base, Kansas as a result of the 384th Wing implementing the USAF objective wing organization. The 384th was assigned control of the 28th Bomb Squadron, flying Rockwell B-1B Lancers, and the 384th Air Refueling Squadron, flying Boeing KC-135 Stratotankers, as its operational units, and the 384th Operations Support Squadron. When the Air Force reorganized its commands in June 1992, the 384th Air Refueling Squadron was transferred to the 19th Operations Group of Air Mobility Command (AMC), while the remainder of the group became part of Air Combat Command. The group was inactivated on 1 January 1994, as the bomber force at McConnell was being reduced prior to the transfer of the base to AMC. It transferred its remaining units to the 384 Wing, which was redesignated as 384th Bomb Group.

The group was redesignated the 384th Air Expeditionary Group in December 2001. (Note: DAF/XPM Letter 273s-8 revoked the designation of the 384th Bomb Group as the 384th Air Expeditionary Group and instead redesignated the 384th Operations Group as the 384th Air Expeditionary Group, retroactive to December 2001.) It was reactivated at Shaikh Isa Air Base, Bahrain in June 2003, three months after the 2003 invasion of Iraq. It was replaced by the 384th Air Expeditionary Wing in September.

== Lineage ==
- Constituted as the 384th Operations Group on 29 August 1991

Activated on 1 September 1991
Inactivated on 1 January 1994
Redesignated 384th Air Expeditionary Group and converted to provisional status on 4 December 2001
Activated on 4 June 2003
Inactivated on 3 September 2003

=== Assignments ===
- 384th Wing (later 384th Bomb Wing), 1 September 1991 – 1 January 1994
- Air Combat Command to activate or inactivate as needed after 4 December 2001

Attached to United States Central Command Air Forces), 4 June 2003 – 3 September 2003

=== Components ===
- 28th Bomb Squadron, 1 September 1991 – 1 January 1994
- 384th Air Refueling Squadron, 1 September 1991 – 1 June 1992
- 384th Operations Support Squadron, 1 September 1991 – 1 January 1994

=== Stations ===
- McConnell Air Force Base, Kansas, 1 September 1991 – 1 January 1994
- Shaikh Isa Air Base, Bahrain, 4 June – 3 September 2003

=== Aircraft ===
- Rockwell B-1B Lancer, 1991–1994
- Boeing KC-135 Stratotanker, 1991–1992
