= B-25 Mitchell units of the United States Army Air Forces =

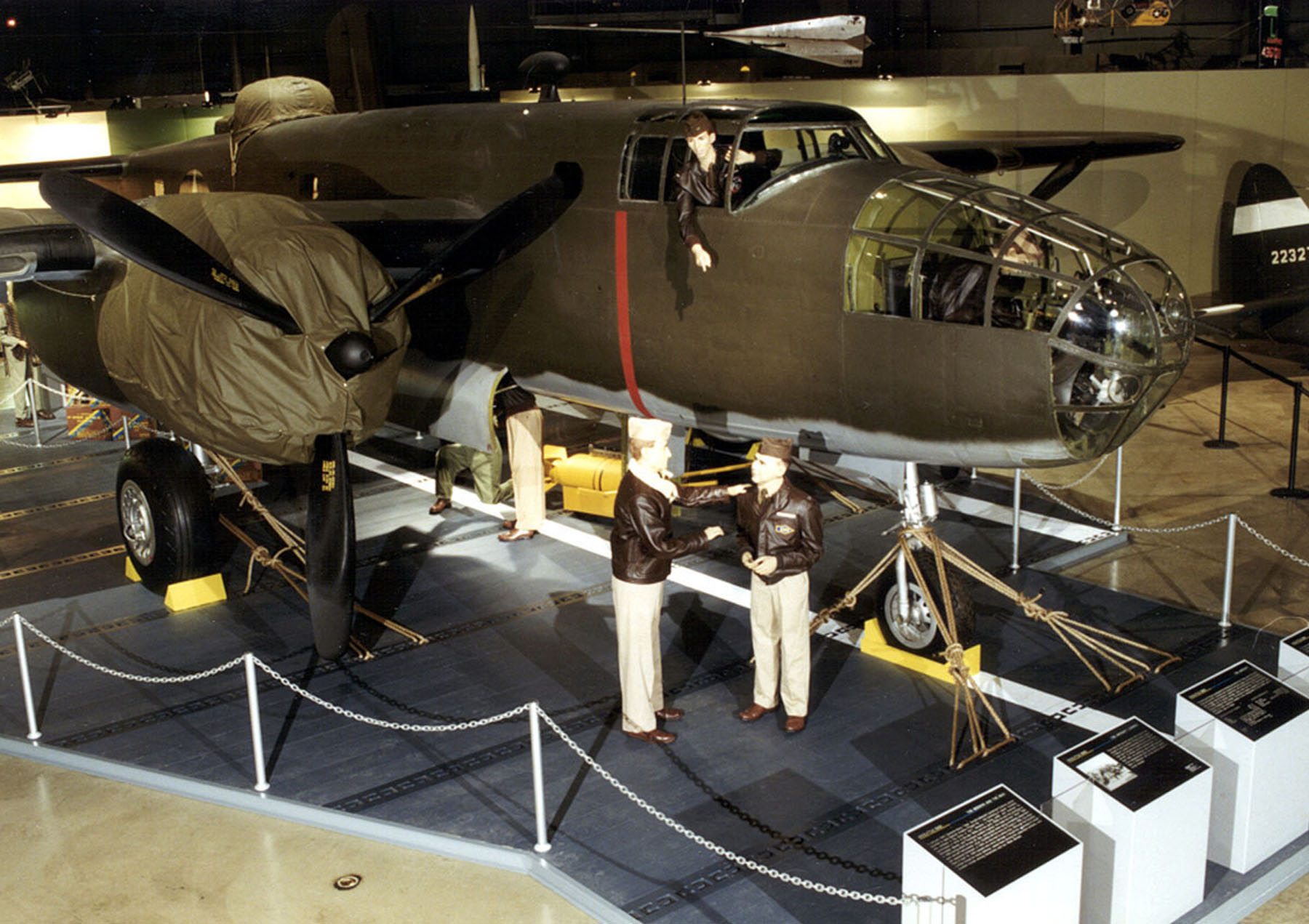
North American RB-25D-30 (F-10) Mitchell 43–3374 at the National Museum of the United States Air Force. This aircraft was removed from storage at Tucson, Arizona, and rebuilt by North American Aviation at Inglewood, California, to the configuration the lead B-25B flown by Lt. Col. Doolittle on the Tokyo Raid, B-25B 40–2344. It was flown to the museum in April 1958.

See also List of United States Army Air Forces reconnaissance units for F-10 Mitchell reconnaissance groups

This is a list of United States Army Air Forces B-25 Mitchell medium bomber units. It does not include non-combat units assigned within the United States for operational training or replacement training.

The B-25 medium bomber was one the most famous airplanes of World War II. It was the type used by Gen. Jimmy Doolittle for the famous Doolittle Raid over Japan on 18 April 1942.

The first B-25 test aircraft flew on 19 August 1940, and the first production Mitchell was delivered to the 17th Bombardment Group in February 1941. A total of 9,816 Mitchells were built, greater than any other American twin-engined bomber. The majority of B-25s in American service were used in the Pacific Theater of Operations (PTO) and the Aleutian Campaign. In the China-Burma-India Theater (CBI), the B-25 attacked Japanese communication links, especially bridges in central Burma. It also helped to supply the besieged troops at Imphal in 1944.

In 1942, the first B-25Bs arrived in Egypt just in time to take part in the Battle of El Alamein. From there the aircraft took part in the rest of the Western Desert Campaign, the invasion of Sicily and the advance up Italy. The five bombardment groups that used the B-25 in the North African desert and the Mediterranean Theater of Operations (MTO) were the only US units to use the B-25 in Europe. In addition to the bombardment groups, the F-10 photographic reconnaissance variant of the Mitchell was widely used.

After the war, the B-25 was taken out of front-line service and redesignated the TB-25, reflecting that it was no longer considered a combat aircraft. It flew training roles with the United States Air Force for many years, the last example, TB-25J 44-30210 not being retired until 31 January 1959.

== Units ==
- 3rd Bombardment Group

Fifth Air Force (SW Pacific), 1942-1944
Australia, New Guinea, Netherlands East Indies, Philippines
8th Bombardment Squadron
13th Bombardment Squadron
90th Bombardment Squadron
Transitioned to A-20 Havoc, late 1944

- 12th Bombardment Group

Ninth Air Force (Middle East), 1942-1943
Twelfth Air Force (MTO), 1943-1944
Tenth Air Force (CBI), 1944-1945
Egypt, Libya, Tunisia, Sicily, Italy, India
81st Bombardment Squadron
82nd Bombardment Squadron
83rd Bombardment Squadron
434th Bombardment Squadron
Inactivated in India, 1945

- 17th Bombardment Group

Doolittle Raid
Second Air Force (ZI/CONUS), 1941-1942
Oregon, South Carolina
34th Bombardment Squadron
37th Bombardment Squadron
89th Reconnaissance Squadron
95th Bombardment Squadron
Doolittle Raider volunteers chosen from all 4 squadrons.
Transitioned to Martin B-26 Marauder, June 1942

- 22nd Bombardment Group

Fifth Air Force (SW Pacific), 1942-1944
Australia, New Guinea, Philippines
2nd Bombardment Squadron
18th Bombardment Squadron
19th Bombardment Squadron
33rd Bombardment Squadron
Transitioned to Consolidated B-24 Liberator, Jan 1944

- 28th Bombardment Group

Eleventh Air Force (Aleutian Campaign), 1941-1945
Alaska Territory
37th Bombardment Squadron
37th Bombardment Squadron
406th Bombardment Squadron
Inactivated Oct 1945

- 38th Bombardment Group

Fifth Air Force (SW Pacific), 1942-1945
Australia, New Guinea, Netherlands East Indies, Philippines
71st Bombardment Squadron
405th Bombardment Squadron
822nd Bombardment Squadron
823rd Bombardment Squadron
Transitioned to Douglas A-26 Invader, Sep 1945

- 41st Bombardment Group

Seventh Air Force (Central Pacific), 1943-1946
Tarawa, Gilbert Islands, Okinawa
47th Bombardment Squadron
48th Bombardment Squadron
396th Bombardment Squadron
820th Bombardment Squadron
Inactivated Jan 1946

- 42nd Bombardment Group

Thirteenth Air Force (South Pacific), 1943-1946
Solomon Islands, Netherlands East Indies, Philippines
69th Bombardment Squadron
70th Bombardment Squadron
75th Bombardment Squadron
100th Bombardment Squadron
390th Bombardment Squadron
Inactivated May 1946

- 310th Bombardment Group

Twelfth Air Force (North Africa), 1942-1943
Fifteenth Air Force (MTO), 1943-1945
Morocco, Algeria, Tunisia, Corsica, Italy
379th Bombardment Squadron
380th Bombardment Squadron
381st Bombardment Squadron
428th Bombardment Squadron
Inactivated Sep 1945

- 319th Bombardment Group

Twelfth Air Force (North Africa) (MTO), 1944-1945
Corsica
437th Bombardment Squadron
438th Bombardment Squadron
439th Bombardment Squadron
440th Bombardment Squadron
Replaced by Douglas A-26 Invader

- 321st Bombardment Group

Twelfth Air Force (North Africa) (MTO), 1943-1945
Algeria, Tunisia, Italy
445th Bombardment Squadron
446th Bombardment Squadron
447th Bombardment Squadron
448th Bombardment Squadron
Inactivated Sep 1945

- 340th Bombardment Group

Ninth Air Force (Middle East), 1942-1943
Twelfth Air Force (MTO). 1943-1945
Egypt, Libya, Tunisia, Sicily, Italy
486th Bombardment Squadron
487th Bombardment Squadron
488th Bombardment Squadron
489th Bombardment Squadron
Inactivated Nov 1945

- 341st Bombardment Group

Tenth Air Force (CBI), 1942-43
Fourteenth Air Force (CBI), 1944-1945
India, China
11th Bombardment Squadron
22d Bombardment Squadron
490th Bombardment Squadron
491st Bombardment Squadron
Inactivated Nov 1945

- 345th Bombardment Group

Fifth Air Force (SW Pacific), 1942-1945
New Guinea, Netherlands East Indies, Philippines
498th Bombardment Squadron
499th Bombardment Squadron
500th Bombardment Squadron
501st Bombardment Squadron
Inactivated Dec 1945
