= Northwest African Strategic Air Force =

The Northwest African Strategic Air Force (NASAF) was a sub-command of the Northwest African Air Forces (NAAF) which itself was a sub-command of the Mediterranean Air Command (MAC). These new Allied air force organizations were created at the Casablanca Conference in January 1943 to promote cooperation between the British Royal Air Force (RAF), the American United States Army Air Forces (USAAF), and their respective ground and naval forces in the North African and Mediterranean Theater of Operations (MTO).

Effective February 18, 1943, the NASAF and other MAC commands existed until December 10, 1943 when MAC was disbanded and the Mediterranean Allied Air Forces (MAAF) were established. Major General Jimmy Doolittle was the commander of NASAF. However, during at least one critical period of the Tunisia Campaign at the end of February, 1943, General Carl Spaatz, the commander of NAAF, placed most of the strategic bombers at the disposal of Air Marshal Sir Arthur Coningham, commander of the Northwest African Tactical Air Force.

== Order of battle ==
The components of NASAF at the time of the Allied invasion of Sicily (Operation Husky) on July 10, 1943 are illustrated below.

Northwest African Strategic Air Force Major General James H. Doolittle
5th Bombardment Wing (USAAF) Brigadier General Joseph Atkinson	47th Bombardment Wing (USAAF) Brigadier General Carlyle Ridenour	*2686th Bombardment Wing(USAAF) Brigadier General Robert M. Webster	No. 205 Group Air Commodore John Simpson
2nd Bombardment Group (USAAF); Lieutenant Colonel Joseph Thomas 340th Squadron, B-17 Fortress; 341st Squadron, B-17 Fortress; 342nd Squadron, B-17 Fortress; 414th Squadron, B-17 Fortress	310th Bombardment Group (USAAF); Colonel Anthony Hunter 379th Squadron, B-25 Mitchell; 380th Squadron, B-25 Mitchell; 381st Squadron, B-25 Mitchell; 428th Squadron, B-25 Mitchell	17th Bombardment Group (USAAF); Lieutenant Colonel Charles Greening' 34th Squadron, B-26 Marauder; 37th Squadron, B-26 Marauder; 95th Squadron, B-26 Marauder; 432nd Squadron, B-26 Marauder	No. 231 Wing (RAF) No. 37 Squadron, Wellington; No. 40 Squadron, Wellington; No. 70 Squadron, Wellington -
97th Bombardment Group (USAAF); Colonel Leroy Rainey 20th Squadron, B-17 Fortress; 49th Squadron, B-17 Fortress; 96th Squadron, B-17 Fortress; 429th Squadron, B-17 Fortress	321st Bombardment Group (USAAF); Colonel Robert Knapp 445th Squadron, B-25 Mitchell; 446th Squadron, B-25 Mitchell; 447th Squadron, B-25 Mitchell; 448th Squadron, B-25 Mitchell	319th Bombardment Group (USAAF); Colonel Gordon Austin 437th Squadron, B-26 Marauder; 438th Squadron, B-26 Marauder; 439th Squadron, B-26 Marauder; 440th Squadron, B-26 Marauder	No. 236 Wing (RAF) No. 104 Squadron, Wellington; No. 462 Squadron, Halifax -
99th Bombardment Group (USAAF); Colonel Fay Upthegrove 346th Squadron, B-17 Fortress; 347th Squadron, B-17 Fortress; 348th Squadron, B-17 Fortress; 416th Squadron, B-17 Fortress	82nd Fighter Group (USAAF); Colonel John Weltman 95th Squadron, P-38 Lightning; 96th Squadron, P-38 Lightning; 97th Squadron, P-38 Lightning -	320th Bombardment Group (USAAF); Colonel Karl Baumeister 441st Squadron, B-26 Marauder; 442nd Squadron, B-26 Marauder; 443rd Squadron, B-26 Marauder; 444th Squadron, B-26 Marauder	No. 330 Wing (RAF) No. 142 Squadron, Wellington; No. 150 Squadron, Wellington - -
301st Bombardment Group (USAAF); Lieutenant Colonel Samuel Gormly, Jr. 32nd Squadron, B-17 Fortress; 352nd Squadron, B-17 Fortress; 353rd Squadron, B-17 Fortress; 419th Squadron, B-17 Fortress		325th Fighter Group (USAAF); Lieutenant Colonel Robert Baseler 317th Squadron, P-40 Warhawk; 318th Squadron, P-40 Warhawk; 319th Squadron, P-40 Warhawk -	No. 331 Wing (RCAF) No. 420 Squadron, Wellington; No. 424 Squadron, Wellington; No. 425 Squadron, Wellington -
1st Fighter Group (USAAF); Major Joseph Peddie 27th Squadron, P-38 Lightning; 71st Squadron, P-38 Lightning; 94th Squadron, P-38 Lightning -			
14th Fighter Group (USAAF); Colonel Oliver Taylor 37th Squadron, P-38 Lightning; 48th Squadron, P-38 Lightning; 49th Squadron, P-38 Lightning -			

- The 2686th Medium Bombardment Wing (Provisional) was activated on June 6, 1943 at Sedrata, Algeria and disbanded on September 3, 1943 at Ariana, Tunisia. Although the 42nd Bombardment Wing (Medium) is sometimes used to refer to the wing during this period, the 42nd Wing was actually the successor of the 2686th Wing.

== See also ==
- List of Royal Air Force commands
