= 448th Missile Squadron =

Inactive United States Air Force unit

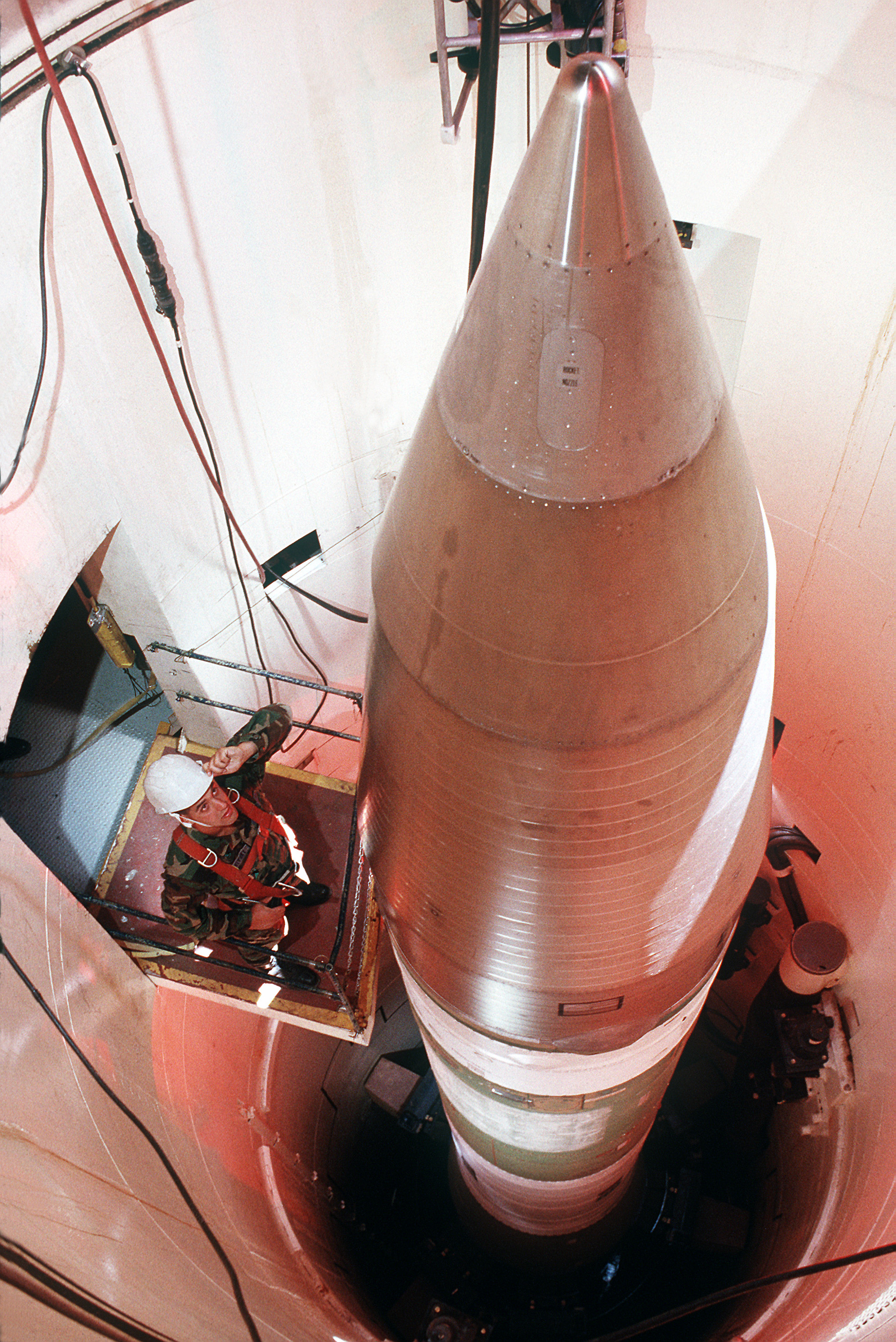
- Minuteman III in silo near Grand Forks AFB in 1989
- Active: 1942–1945; 1947–1949; 1959–1961; 1965–1997
- Country: United States
- Branch: United States Air Force
- Type: Squadron
- Role: Intercontinental ballistic missile
- Motto: In Aquilae Cura (Latin for 'Under the Care of the Eagle')
- Engagements: Mediterranean Theater of Operations
- Decorations: Distinguished Unit Citation; Air Force Outstanding Unit Award

Insignia
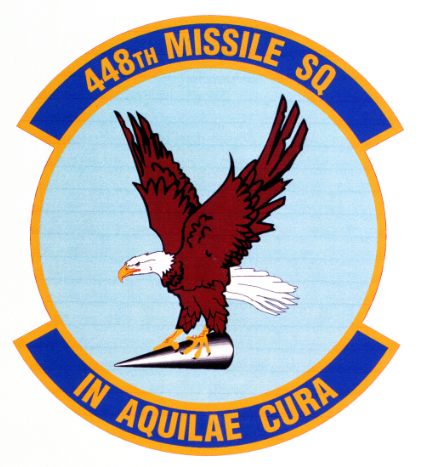
- 448 Missile Sq emblem (Note: Reinstated and modified 17 October 1994. Description: Celeste, a bald eagle soaring proper grasping a missile warhead proper; all within a diminished bordure Or. Significance: The background of turquoise blue is the squadron color and represents the sky, the primary theater of Air Force operations. The American eagle, symbol of our nation and its air power, is representative of the squadron's striking power. The eagle's outstretched wings denote the unit's constant readiness to unleash destruction against any enemy who threatens the peace and freedom of our country. In the talons of the eagle rests a reentry vehicle poised for release upon command.)

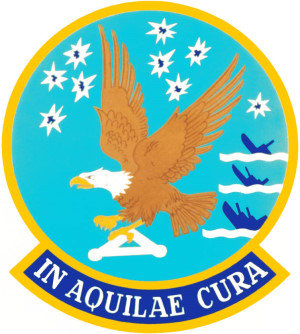
- 448th Strategic Missile Squadron emblem (Note: Approved 30 November 1966. Description: On a light blue disc within a narrow gold border an American eagle in flight (brown detailed dark brown, head white, beak gold, eye black, and talons gold) bearing in sinister talon a white airstrip and in chief nine white shell bursts centers blue; in sinister flank behind the eagle a blue submarine, a blue cruiser, and a blue battleship, each sinking into a white wavy bar. Below the emblem a blue scroll edged gold and inscribed [with the motto] in white capital letters. Significance: The background in the squadron color, turquoise blue, represents the sky. . . . The American eagle, symbol of our nation and its air power, is representative of the squadron's striking power, and with outstretched wings denotes the unit's constant readiness to unleash destruction against any enemy who threatens the peace and freedom of our country. In the talons of the eagle an airstrip (the first launch pad for Air Force weapons systems) with two hardstands symbolizes the two Distinguished Unit Citations earned by the squadron during World War II, one for bombing a battleship, a cruiser, and a submarine in Toulon harbor during the Allied invasion of southern France, and the other for participating in a successful bombing raid on an airdrome near Athens in spite of heavy flak; the shell bursts number nine to denote the squadron's World War II Campaign Participation Credits.)

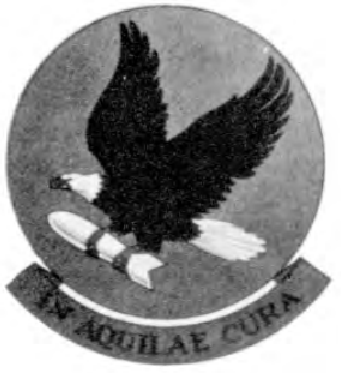
- 448th Bombardment Squadron emblem (Note: Approved 3 February 1960. Description: On a turquoise blue disc, an American eagle in flight, natural colors, grasping in his talons a white bomb outlines Air Force blue, highlights turquoise.)

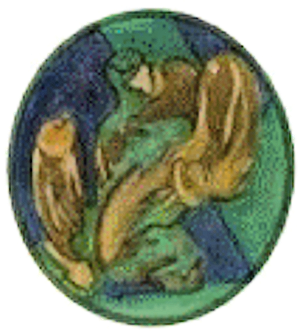
- 448th Bombardment Squadron emblem (World War II)

The 448th Missile Squadron is an inactive United States Air Force unit. It was last assigned to the 321st Missile Group at Grand Forks Air Force Base, North Dakota. The 448th was equipped with the LGM-30 Minuteman intercontinental ballistic missile, with a mission of nuclear deterrence. With the end of the Cold War, the 448th was inactivated on 23 September 1997.

The squadron was first activated in 1942 as the 448th Bombardment Squadron and was equipped with North American B-25 Mitchell medium bombers. After training in the United States, it deployed to the Mediterranean Theater of Operations, serving in combat until 1945. The squadron earned a Distinguished Unit Citation for its actions. After the war, it returned to the United States and was inactivated.

The squadron was briefly activated in the reserve from 1947 to 1949, but does not appear to have been fully manned or equipped with operational aircraft. It was activated in 1953 as a Strategic Air Command bomber unit, serving until 1961, when its Boeing B-47 Stratojets were replaced by Boeing B-52 Stratofortresses. It was organized in February 1965 as the 448th Strategic Missile Squadron.

== History ==
=== World War II ===
==== Initial organization and training ====
The squadron was first organized as a medium bomber unit at Barksdale Field, Louisiana in late June 1942. It was one of the original four squadrons of the 321st Bombardment Group, which were equipped with North American B-25 Mitchells. However, it was not until the squadron moved on paper to Columbia Army Air Base, South Carolina, that the initial cadre was assigned in August 1942

After five months of training, the ground echelon of the squadron departed for the Port of Embarkation at Camp Kilmer, New Jersey on 21 January 1943. It boarded the USS Elizabeth C. Stanton on 7 February. The air echelon of the squadron remained at DeRidder Army Air Base until 12 February, when it flew to Morrison Field, Florida for staging via the South Atlantic ferry route. It departed Morrison for overseas on 15 February 1943.

==== Combat in the Mediterranean Theater ====
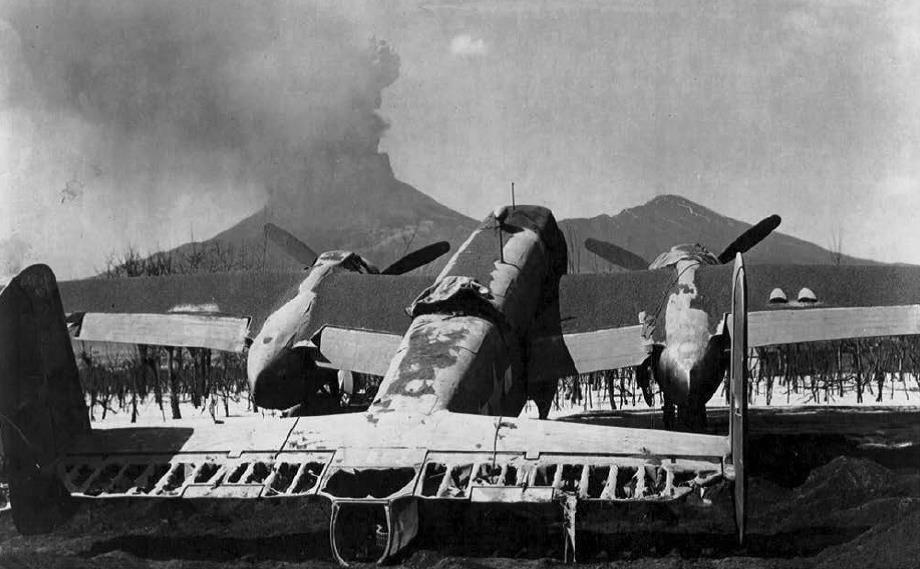
321st Group B-25 at Pompeii Airfield after 1944 Mount Vesuvius eruption

The ground echelon landed at Oran, Algeria on 21 February 1943. The air echelon arrived in Algeria at Oujda Airfield on 2 March 43. On 9 March most of the ground and air echelon was united at Oujda. The squadron arrived at its first combat station, Ain M'lila Airfield, Algeria, in March 1943, with the air echelon established there on 12 March. The squadron flew its first combat mission, an attack on a landing ground near Mezzouna Tunisia on 15 March. It initially engaged primarily in air support and interdiction missions, bombing marshalling yards, rail lines, highways, bridges, viaducts, troop concentrations, gun emplacements, shipping, harbors, and other objectives in North Africa. Later, objectives spread into France, Italy, Bulgaria, Yugoslavia, and Greece. It also engaged in psychological warfare missions, dropping propaganda leaflets behind enemy lines.

Until May 1943, it participated in Allied operations against the Axis in Algeria and Tunisia. In June, it moved forward to bases in Tunisia, from which it participated in Operation Corkscrew, the projected invasion of and reduction of Pantelleria and Lampedusa. The following month, it supported Operation Husky, the invasion of Sicily and in September, Operation Avalanche the invasion of mainland Italy near Salerno. On 8 October 1943, the squadron completed a raid on Eleusis Airfield near Athens, despite intense flak and attacks by numerous enemy Messerschmitt Bf 109 and Focke-Wulf Fw 190 interceptor aircraft. For this action it was awarded a Distinguished Unit Citation (DUC).

The squadron provided air support for the Allied advance toward Rome between January and June 1944 and Operation Dragoon, the invasion of Southern France in August 1944. On 18 August, its attacks on Toulon harbor earned the squadron a second DUC. The enemy had concentrated shipping in the harbor to augment harbor defense artillery. Adverse weather conditions caused other groups to turn back, but the 321st Group continued to the target. The squadron pressed its attack despite "heavy, intense, accurate" flak on the bomb run. Post strike reconnaissance showed the 321st Group heavily damaged a battleship, and sunk a cruiser and a submarine.

After September 1944, it supported Allied operations in northern Italy, including Operation Strangle, the effort to choke off supplies for Axis military in Italy through air interdiction and Operation Grapeshot, the Spring 1945 offensive in Northern Italy from September 1944 to April 1945. It remained in Italy after V-E Day, reducing in size as individuals returned to the United States, being reduced to a mere cadre by August 1945 and was inactivated at Pomigliano Airfield on 12 September 1945.

=== Reserve operations ===
The squadron was reactivated as a reserve unit under Air Defense Command (ADC) on 22 June 1947 at Stout Field, Indiana. It is not clear whether or not the squadron was fully staffed and it was only equipped with trainer aircraft during this period. In July 1948 Continental Air Command (ConAC) assumed responsibility for managing reserve and Air National Guard units from ADC. President Truman’s reduced 1949 defense budget required reductions in the number of units in the Air Force, and the 448th was inactivated and not replaced as reserve flying operations at Stout Field ceased.

=== Strategic bomber unit ===
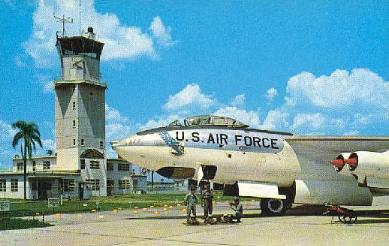
B-47 Stratojet at McCoy AFB

From 1958, the Boeing B-47 Stratojet wings of Strategic Air Command (SAC) began to assume an alert posture at their home bases, reducing the amount of time spent on alert at overseas bases. The SAC alert cycle divided itself into four parts: planning, flying, alert and rest to meet General Thomas S. Power’s initial goal of maintaining one third of SAC's planes on fifteen minute ground alert, fully fueled and ready for combat to reduce vulnerability to a Soviet missile strike. To implement this new system, B-47 wings reorganized from three to four squadrons. The 448th was activated at McCoy Air Force Base, Florida on 1 February 1959 as the fourth squadron of the 321st Bombardment Wing.

However, SAC was relying on the longer range Boeing B-52 Stratofortress, deciding to reduce the number of B-47 wings at March Air Force Base from two to one. With this reduction, the 448th was inactivated on 15 September 1960.

=== Intercontinental ballistic missile squadron ===
On 2 August 1965 the squadron was redesignated the 448th Strategic Missile Squadron, a SAC intercontinental ballistic missile squadron, but it was not organized at Grand Forks Air Force Base, North Dakota until 15 September 1965, the last squadron of the 321st Strategic Missile Wing to be organized. The 321st Wing was the first to be equipped with LGM-30F Minuteman II missiles. Squadron members trained on the new missile at Vandenberg Air Force Base, California. The squadron was declared fully operational in December 1966, with a complement of 50 missiles. following an Operational Readiness Inspection of the 321st Wing

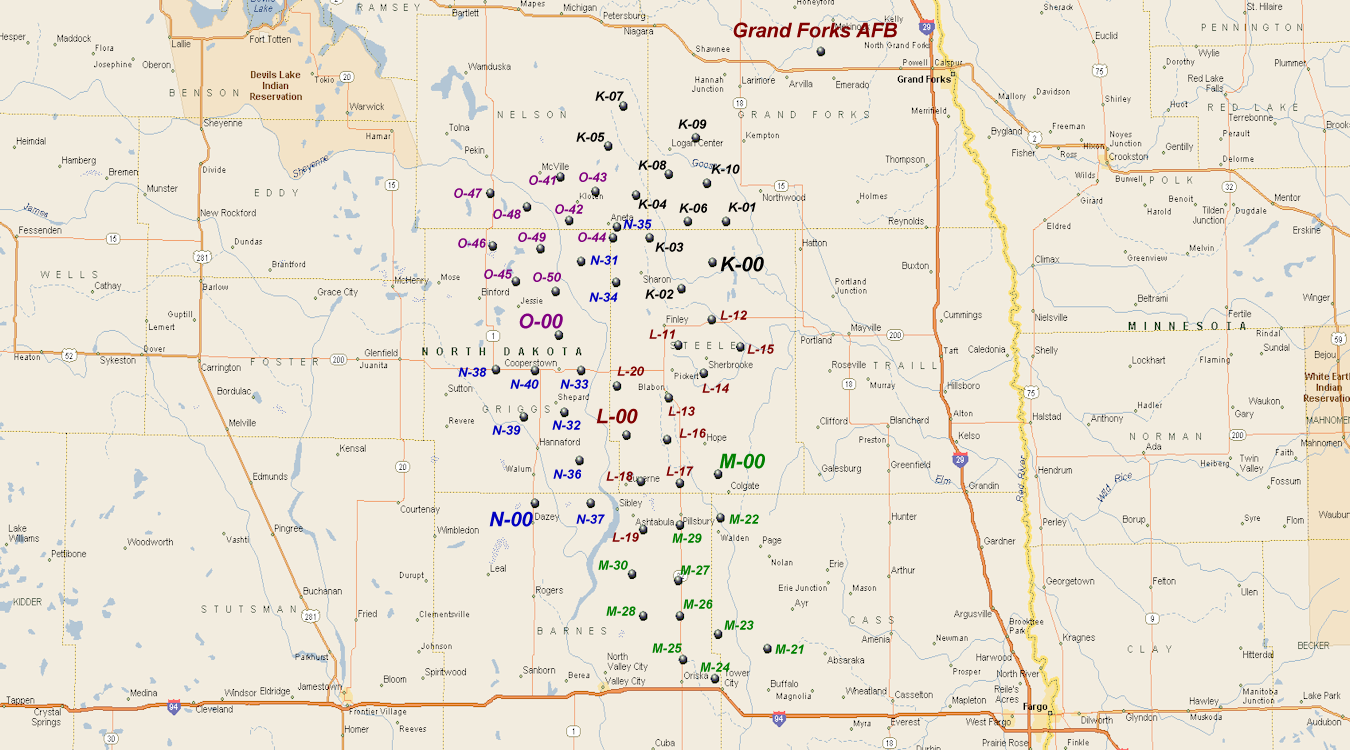
LGM-30 Minuteman Missile Alert and Launch Facilities

448th Missile Squadron Launch Facilities

Missile Alert Facilities (K-O flights, each controlling 10 missiles) are located as follows:

K-00 9.6 mi NE of Finley ND, 47°37′01″N 097°42′14″W
L-00 10.5 mi W of Hope ND, 47°20′03″N 097°56′24″W
M-00 3.8 mi SxSE of Hope ND, 47°16′17″N 097°41′19″W
N-00 6.1 mi S of Hannaford ND, 47°13′24″N 098°11′30″W
O-00 3.6 mi N of Cooperstown ND, 47°29′51″N 098°07′37″W

In December 1971, the squadron began replacing its Minuteman II missiles with LGM-30G Minuteman IIIs. These missiles were equipped with multiple independently targetable reentry vehicles and penetration aids. The transition was completed in March 1972.

In September 1991, SAC implemented the Air Force's Objective Wing Organization. With this restructuring, the squadron was assigned to the new 321st Operations Group, along with the 321st Wing's other missile squadrons and a support squadron. With this change came a new name, the 448th Missile Squadron, as the Air Force dropped the terms "Strategic" and "Tactical" from the names of its units. The following June, SAC was disestablished and the squadron was transferred to Air Combat Command, along with other intercontinental missile units. This arrangement lasted only a year, for on 1 July 1993, these missile units became part of Air Force Space Command.

The Strategic Arms Limitation Treaty required the United States to reduce the number of missiles in its inventory, and to meet this goal, the 321st Wing was selected for inactivation by the 1995 Base Realignment and Closure Commission. The squadron transferred its Minuteman III missiles to the 341st Missile Wing at Malmstrom Air Force Base, Montana to replace the 341st's Minuteman IIs. It maintained nuclear alert until it was inactivated in September 1997.

== Lineage ==
- Constituted as the 448th Bombardment Squadron (Medium) on 19 June 1942

Activated on 26 June 1942
Redesignated 448th Bombardment Squadron, Medium on 6 March 1944
Inactivated on 12 September 1945

- Redesignated 448th Bombardment Squadron, Light on 29 January 1947

Activated in the reserve on 15 March 1947
Inactivated on 27 June 1949

- Redesignated 448th Bombardment Squadron, Medium on 30 October 1958

Activated on 1 February 1959
Discontinued and inactivated on 25 October 1961

- Redesignated 448th Strategic Missile Squadron (ICBM-Minuteman) on 2 August 1965 and activated (not organized)

Organized on 15 September 1965
Redesignated 448th Missile Squadron on 1 September 1991
Inactivated on 23 September 1997

=== Assignments ===
- 321st Bombardment Group, 26 June 1942 – 12 September 1945
- Eleventh Air Force, (Note: This headquarters is not related to Eleventh Air Force, but was briefly active at Olmsted Air Force Base, Pennsylvania and responsible for managing reserve and National Guard air force units in the Middle Atlantic during the 1940s.) 15 March 1947
- 321st Bombardment Group, 30 September 1947 – 27 June 1949
- 321st Bombardment Wing, 1 February 1959 – 25 October 1961
- 321st Strategic Missile Wing (later 321st Missile Wing), 1 September 1965
- 321st Operations Group, 1 September 1991
- 321st Missile Group, 1 July 1994 – 23 September 1997

=== Stations ===
- Barksdale Field, Louisiana, 26 June 1942
- Columbia Army Air Base, South Carolina, c. 1 August 1942
- Walterboro Army Air Field, South Carolina, September 1942
- DeRidder Army Air Base, Louisiana, c. 1 December 1942 – 21 January 1943
- Ain M'lila Airfield, Algeria, 12 March 1943
- Souk-el-Arba Airfield, Tunisia, c. 1 June 1943
- Soliman Airfield, Tunisia, 8 August 1943
- Grottaglie Airfield, Italy, October 1943
- Amendola Airfield, Italy, c. 20 November 1943
- Vincenzo Airfield, Italy, 14 January 1944
- Gaudo Airfield, Italy, February 1944
- Solenzara Air Base, Corsica, France, 23 April 1944
- Falconara Airfield, Italy, 1 April 1945
- Pomigliano Airfield, Italy, c. September-12 September 1945
- Stout Field, Indiana 15 March 1947 – 27 June 1949
- McCoy Air Force Base, Florida, 1 February 1959 – 25 October 1961
- Grand Forks Air Force Base, North Dakota, 1 September 1965 – 23 September 1997

=== Aircraft and missiles ===
- North American B-25 Mitchell (1942–1945)
- North American AT-6 Texan (1947–1949)
- Beechcraft AT-11 Kansan (1947–1949)
- Boeing B-47E Stratojet, 1953–1961
- LGM-30F Minuteman II, 1965–1973
- LGM-30G Minuteman III, 1972–1997

=== Awards and campaigns ===
Award streamer	Award	Dates	Notes
	Distinguished Unit Citation	8 October 1943	Athens, Greece; 448th Bombardment Squadron
	Distinguished Unit Citation	18 August 1944	Toulon, France; 448th Bombardment Squadron
	Air Force Outstanding Unit Award	1 July 1968–30 June 1969	448th Strategic Missile Squadron
	Air Force Outstanding Unit Award	1 July 1985–30 June 1987	448th Strategic Missile Squadron
	Air Force Outstanding Unit Award	1 October 1994–30 September 1996	448th Strategic Missile Squadron
	Air Force Outstanding Unit Award	1 October 1996–30 September 1997	448th Missile Squadron

Campaign Streamer	Campaign	Dates	Notes
	Tunisia	12 March 1943 – 13 May 1943	448th Bombardment Squadron
	Air Combat, EAME Theater	12 March 1943 – 11 May 1945	448th Bombardment Squadron
	Sicily	14 May 1943 – 17 August 1943	448th Bombardment Squadron
	Naples-Foggia	18 August 1943 – 21 January 1944	448th Bombardment Squadron
	Rome-Arno	22 January 1944 – 9 September 1944	448th Bombardment Squadron
	Central Europe	22 March 1944 – 21 May 1945	448th Bombardment Squadron
	Southern France	15 August 1944 – 14 September 1944	448th Bombardment Squadron
	North Apennines	10 September 1944 – 4 April 1945	448th Bombardment Squadron
	Po Valley	3 April 1945 – 8 May 1945	448th Bombardment Squadron

== See also ==
- List of United States Air Force missile squadrons
- 448th Missile Squadron Launch Facilities
- List of B-47 units of the United States Air Force
