= 445th Air Expeditionary Squadron =

445th Bombardment Squadron (Currently 445th Air Expeditionary Squadron)

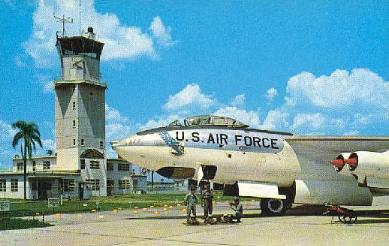
- B-47 Stratojet at McCoy AFB
- Active: 1942–1945; 1947–1949; 1953–1961
- Country: United States
- Branch: United States Air Force
- Role: Medium bomber
- Part of: Air Combat Command
- Engagements: Mediterranean Theater of Operations; European Theater of Operations
- Decorations: Distinguished Unit Citation

Insignia
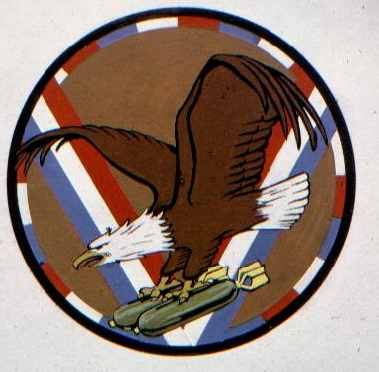
- 445th Bombardment Squadron emblem

The 445th Air Expeditionary Squadron is a provisional United States Air Force unit. It was last assigned as the 445th Bombardment Squadron, a regular Air Force unit, to the 321st Bombardment Wing at McCoy Air Force Base, Florida, where it was inactivated on 25 October 1961.

The squadron was first activated in June 1942 as a medium bomber unit. After training in the United States, it deployed to the Mediterranean Theater of Operations, where it engaged in combat until April 1945. It was awarded two Presidential Unit Citations for its actions over Athens, Greece in 1944 and Toulon, France in 1944. Following V-E Day, it remained in Italy, until it was inactivated in September 1945.

The squadron was briefly activated in the reserve from 1947 to 1949, but does not appear to have been fully manned or equipped with operational aircraft. It was activated in 1953 as a Strategic Air Command bomber unit, serving until 1961, when its Boeing B-47 Stratojets were replaced by Boeing B-52 Stratofortresses. It was converted to provisional status in 2011 as the 445th Air Expeditionary Squadron, but does not appear to have been active as an expeditionary unit.

== History ==
=== World War II ===
==== Initial organization and training ====
The squadron was first organized as a medium bomber unit at Barksdale Field, Louisiana in late June 1942. It was one of the original four squadrons of the 321st Bombardment Group, which were equipped with North American B-25 Mitchells. However, it was not until the squadron moved on paper to Columbia Army Air Base, South Carolina, that the initial cadre was assigned in August 1942

After five months of training, the ground echelon of the squadron departed for the Port of Embarkation at Camp Kilmer, New Jersey on 21 January 1943. It boarded the USS Elizabeth C. Stanton on 7 February. The air echelon of the squadron remained at DeRidder Army Air Base until 12 February, when it flew to Morrison Field, Florida for staging via the South Atlantic ferry route. It departed Morrison for overseas on 15 February 1943.

==== Combat in the Mediterranean Theater ====
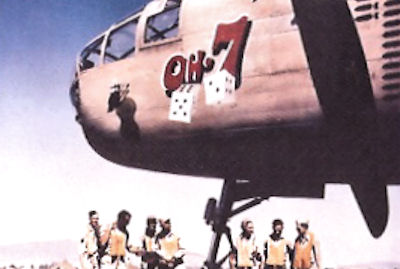
Squadron B-25C Mitchell at Ain M'lila Airfield, Algeria (Note: Aircraft is North American B-25C-1 Mitchell, serial 41-13207 "OH-7". The photo shows its six crew members at the bomber prior to the start of a combat mission. This plane was salvaged on 31 January 1944. Baugher, Joe (11 April 2023). "1941 USAF Serial Numbers". Joe Baugher.)

The ground echelon landed at Oran, Algeria on 21 February 1943. The air echelon arrived in Algeria at Oujda Airfield on 2 March 43. On 9 March most of the ground and air echelon was united at Oujda. The squadron arrived at its first combat station, Ain M'lila Airfield, Algeria, in March 1943, with the air echelon established there on 12 March. The squadron flew its first combat mission, an attack on a landing ground near Mezzouna Tunisia on 15 March. It initially engaged primarily in air support and interdiction missions, bombing marshalling yards, rail lines, highways, bridges, viaducts, troop concentrations, gun emplacements, shipping, harbors, and other objectives in North Africa. Later, objectives spread into France, Italy, Bulgaria, Yugoslavia, and Greece. It also engaged in psychological warfare missions, dropping propaganda leaflets behind enemy lines.

Until May 1943, it participated in Allied operations against the Axis in Algeria and Tunisia. In June, it moved forward to bases in Tunisia, from which it participated in Operation Corkscrew, the projected invasion of and reduction of Pantelleria and Lampedusa. The following month, it supported Operation Husky, the invasion of Sicily and in September, Operation Avalanche the invasion of mainland Italy near Salerno. On 8 October 1943, the squadron completed a raid on Eleusis Airfield near Athens, despite intense flak and attacks by numerous enemy Messerschmitt Bf 109 and Focke-Wulf Fw 190 interceptor aircraft, which resulted in the loss of two of the squadron's attacking aircraft. For this action it was awarded a Distinguished Unit Citation (DUC).

The squadron provided air support for the Allied advance toward Rome between January and June 1944 and Operation Dragoon, the invasion of Southern France in August 1944. On 18 August, its attacks on Toulon harbor earned the squadron a second DUC. The enemy had concentrated shipping in the harbor to augment harbor defense artillery. Adverse weather conditions caused other groups to turn back, but the 321st Group continued to the target. The squadron pressed its attack despite "heavy, intense, accurate" flak on the bomb run. Post strike reconnaissance showed the 321st Group heavily damaged a battleship, and sunk a cruiser and a submarine.

After September 1944, it supported Allied operations in northern Italy, including Operation Strangle, the effort to choke off supplies for Axis military in Italy through air interdiction and Operation Grapeshot, the Spring 1945 offensive in Northern Italy from September 1944 to April 1945. It remained in Italy after V-E Day, reducing in size as individuals returned to the United States, being reduced to a mere cadre by August 1945 and was inactivated at Pomigliano Airfield on 12 September 1945.

=== Reserve operations ===
The squadron was reactivated as a reserve unit under Air Defense Command (ADC) on 29 June 1947 at Toledo Municipal Airport, Ohio. It is not clear whether or not the squadron was fully staffed or equipped with operational aircraft during this period. In July 1948 Continental Air Command (ConAC) assumed responsibility for managing reserve and Air National Guard units from ADC. President Truman’s reduced 1949 defense budget required reductions in the number of units in the Air Force, and the 445th was inactivated and not replaced as reserve flying operations at Toledo Municipal Airport ceased.

=== Strategic Air Command ===
The squadron was reactivated on 15 December 1953 at Pinecastle Air Force Base, Florida, an Air Training Command (ATC) base, where ATC's 3540th Flying Training Wing conducted transition training on Boeing B-47 Stratojet bombers. On 1 January 1954, the base and B-47 training mission were transferred to Strategic Air Command (SAC). (Note: Despite its mission of training bomber crews, the 3540th was designated as the 3540th Flying Training Wing (Fighter). Manning, p. 87. With the transfer to SAC, the 3540th became the 4240th Flying Training Wing and the fighter parenthetical was eliminated.) Under SAC's dual deputy organization, the squadron was assigned directly to the 321st Wing, with the group level organization eliminated. Over the next six months, the B-47 training mission at Pinecastle was phased out and was replaced by the 445th and other operational units of the 321st Bombardment Wing, and the squadron became operational in late May 1954.

The squadron trained in global strategic bombardment operations with the B-47. It deployed with the 321st Wing to RAF Lakenheath, England from December 1954 until March 1955 and to Sidi Slimane Air Base, Morocco From April through July 1956. Starting in 1957, overseas deployments of entire wings to stand alert were replaced by Operation Reflex. Reflex placed Stratojets and Boeing KC-97 Stratofreighters from multiple wings at bases closer to the Soviet Union for 90 day periods, although individuals rotated back to home bases during unit Reflex deployments. From 1958, SAC B-47 units began to assume an alert posture at their home bases, reducing the amount of time spent on alert at overseas bases, with an initial goal of maintaining one third of SAC’s planes on fifteen minute ground alert, fully fueled and ready for combat to reduce vulnerability to a Soviet missile strike.

By 1961, SAC was relying on dispersed Boeing B-52 Stratofortress units as the backbone of its bomber force. The squadron and the rest of the 321st Wing became nonoperational on 15 September 1961 and were replaced by the 4047th Strategic Wing, a B-52 unit. The squadron was inactivated in late October 1961.

=== Expeditionary unit ===
In May 2011, the squadron was converted to provisional status as the 445th Air Expeditionary Squadron and assigned to Air Combat Command to activate and inactivate as needed. The squadron has apparently never been active in this status.

== Lineage ==
- Constituted as the 445th Bombardment Squadron (Medium) on 19 June 1942

Activated on 26 June 1942
Redesignated 445th Bombardment Squadron, Medium on 19 June 1942
Inactivated on 12 September 1945
Redesignated 445th Bombardment Squadron, Light on 26 May 1947
Activated in the reserve on 29 June 1947
Inactivated on 27 June 1949
Redesignated 445th Bombardment Squadron, Medium on 25 November 1953
Activated on 15 December 1953
Discontinued and inactivated on 25 October 1961
Redesignated 445 Air Expeditionary Squadron and converted to provisional status on 13 May 2011

=== Assignments ===
- 321st Bombardment Group, 26 June 1942 – 12 September 1945
- 321st Bombardment Group, 29 June 1947 – 27 June 1949
- 321st Bombardment Wing, 15 December 1953 – 25 October 1961
- Air Combat Command, to activate or inactivate as needed

=== Stations ===
- Barksdale Field, Louisiana, 26 June 1942
- Columbia Army Air Base, South Carolina, c. 1 August 1942
- Walterboro Army Air Field, South Carolina, c. 20 September 1942
- DeRidder Army Air Base, Louisiana, 2 December 1942 – 21 January 1943
- Oujda Airfield, 7 March 1943
- Ain M'lila Airfield, Algeria, 12 March 1943
- Souk-el-Arba Airfield, Tunisia, 1 June 1943
- Soliman Airfield, Tunisia, 8 August 1943
- Grottaglie Airfield, Italy, 3 October 1943
- Amendola Airfield, Italy, c. 20 November 1943
- Vincenzo Airfield, Italy, 14 January 1944
- Gaudo Airfield, Italy, 18 February 1944
- Solenzara Airfield, Corsica, France, 23 April 1944
- Falconara Airfield, Italy, 8 April 1945
- Pomigliano Airfield, Italy, c. August 1945 – 12 September 1945
- Toledo Municipal Airport, Ohio, 29 June 1947 – 27 June 1949
- Pinecastle Air Force Base (later McCoy Air Force Base), Florida, 15 December 1953 – 25 October 1961

=== Aircraft ===
- North American B-25 Mitchell, 1942-1945
- Boeing B-47 Stratojet, 1953-1961

=== Awards and campaigns ===
Award streamer	Award	Dates	Notes
	Distinguished Unit Citation	8 October 1943	Athens, Greece; 445th Bombardment Squadron
	Distinguished Unit Citation	18 August 1944	Toulon, France; 445th Bombardment Squadron

Campaign Streamer	Campaign	Dates	Notes
	Tunisia	12 March 1943 – 13 May 1943	445th Bombardment Squadron
	Air Combat, EAME Theater	12 March 1943 – 11 May 1945	445th Bombardment Squadron
	Sicily	14 May 1943 – 17 August 1943	445th Bombardment Squadron
	Naples-Foggia	18 August 1943 – 21 January 1944	445th Bombardment Squadron
	Rome-Arno	22 January 1944 – 9 September 1944	445th Bombardment Squadron
	Central Europe	22 March 1944 – 21 May 1945	445th Bombardment Squadron
	Southern France	15 August 1944 – 14 September 1944	445th Bombardment Squadron
	North Apennines	10 September 1944 – 4 April 1945	445th Bombardment Squadron
	Po Valley	3 April 1945 – 8 May 1945	445th Bombardment Squadron

== See also ==
- List of B-47 units of the United States Air Force
