= 447th Missile Squadron =

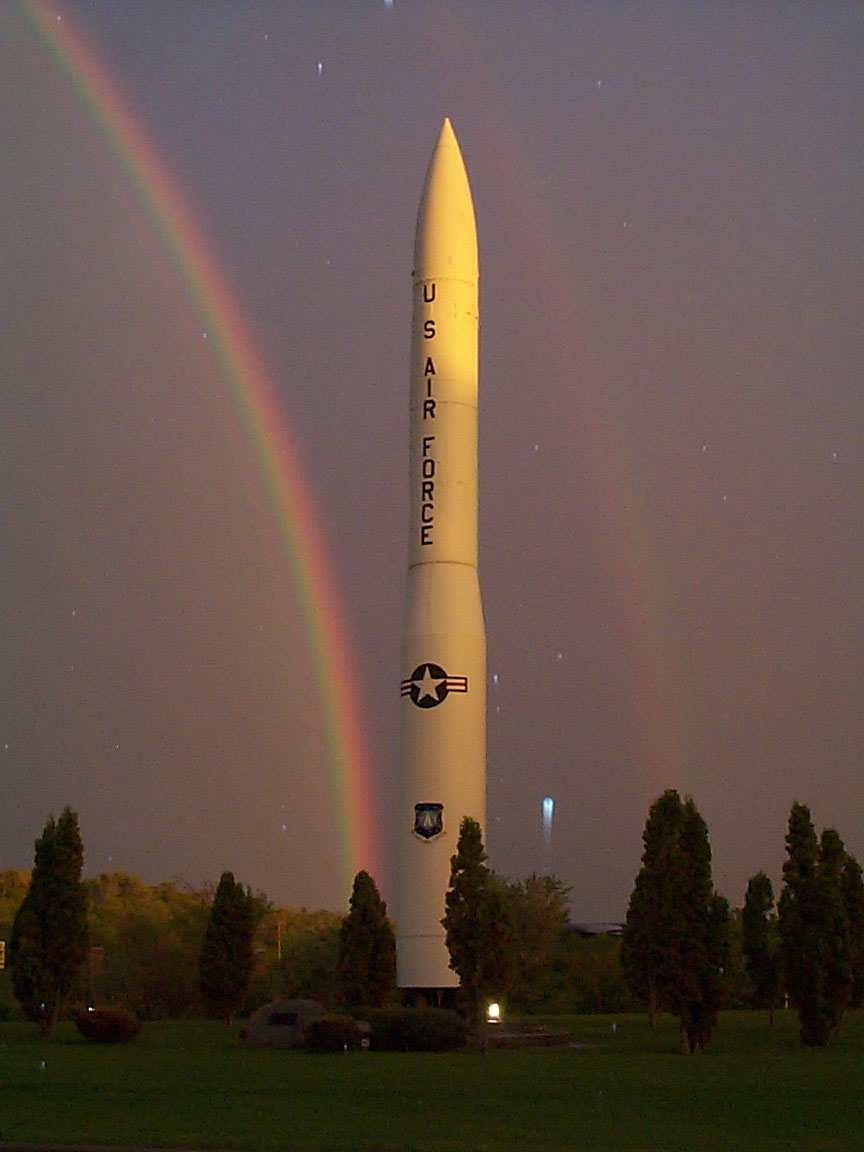
- Minuteman at the front gate of Grand Forks AFB
- Active: 1942-1945; 1947–1949; 1953–1961; 1965-1998
- Country: United States
- Branch: United States Air Force
- Type: Squadron
- Role: Intercontinental ballistic missile
- Motto: Maxime Superiores (Latin for 'The Very Best')
- Engagements: Mediterranean Theater of Operations
- Decorations: Distinguished Unit Citation; Air Force Outstanding Unit Award

Insignia
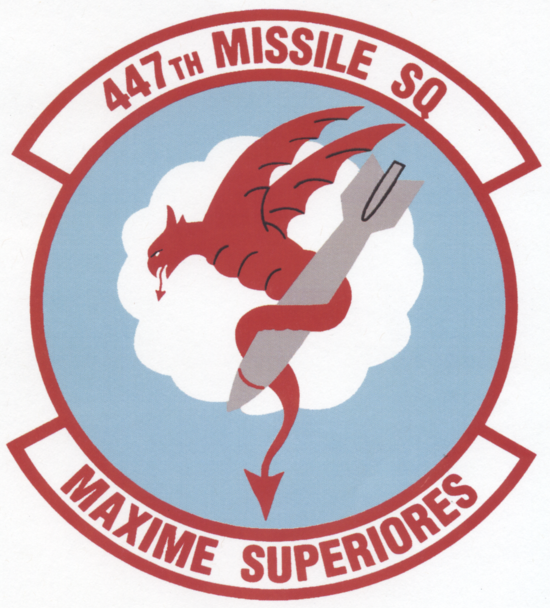
- 447th Missile Squadron emblem (Note: Reinstated and modified 7 October 1994.)

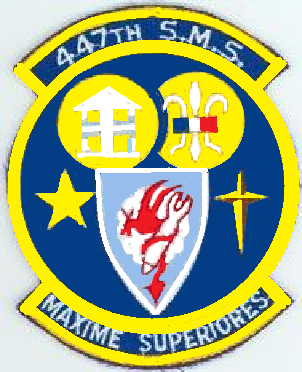
- 447th Strategic Missile Squadron emblem (Note: Approved 25 November 1966. Description: On a blue disc within a narrow gold border in chief two gold roundels charged respectively with a white Greek temple surmounted by a bar bearing a canton of the Greek flag, light blue and white, and a white fleur-de-lis surmounted by a bar bearing the French tricolor, blue, white and red, and between in either flank a gold star of five points and a gold star of four points, both shaded brown, a light blue escutcheon bordered white bearing over a white cloud formation a red chimerical flying reptile entwined around a white weapon with red marking. Emblem between two blue scrolls edged gold. On lower scroll, [the motto] inscribed in white capital letters. Significance: Against the blue field which alludes to the sky, . . . the two roundels denote the unit's World War II Distinguished Unit Citations, one received for operations over Athens, Greece, indicated by the Greek temple bearing a canton of the flag of Greece, and the other for assisting in the Allied invasion of southern France, indicated by the fleur-de-lis surmounted by a bar bearing the colors from the flag of France. The stars symbolize the squadron's World War II Campaign Participation Credits. The escutcheon with its field of sky denotes the unit's assignment to the Strategic Air Command. The flying red reptile, half bird to represent swift flight and half reptile to represent accurate striking power, entwined around a bomb, symbol for aerial weapons, signifies the squadron's aggressive, driving desire to ascend above all others in accomplishing any assigned mission.)

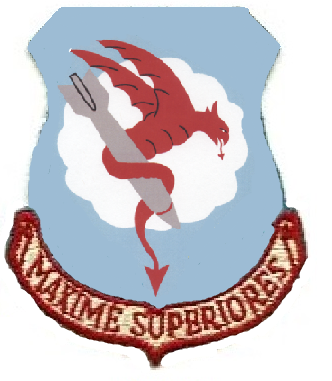
- 447 Bombardment Sq emblem (Note: Approved 7 May 1956. Description: On a medium sky blue shield, over a white cloud formation, a chimerical flying reptile red, his body entwined around a silver-gray bomb, with red marking.)

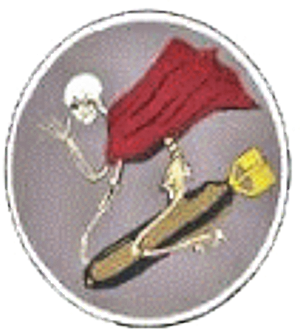
- 447 Bombardment Squadron emblem (World War II)

The 447th Missile Squadron is an inactive United States Air Force unit. It was last assigned to the 321st Missile Group, stationed at Grand Forks Air Force Base, North Dakota. The 447th was equipped with the LGM-30 Minuteman intercontinental ballistic missile, with a mission of nuclear deterrence. With the end of the Cold War, the 447th was inactivated on 2 July 1998.

The squadron was first activated in June 1942 as the 447th Bombardment Squadron, a medium bomber unit. After training in the United States, it deployed to the Mediterranean Theater of Operations, where it engaged in combat until April 1945. It was awarded two Presidential Unit Citations for its actions over Athens, Greece in 1944 and Toulon, France in 1944. Following V-E Day, it remained in Italy, until it was inactivated in September 1945.

The squadron was briefly activated in the reserve from 1947 to 1949, but does not appear to have been fully manned or equipped with operational aircraft. It was activated in 1953 as a Strategic Air Command bomber unit, serving until 1961, when its Boeing B-47 Stratojets were replaced by Boeing B-52 Stratofortresses. It was organized in February 1965 as the 447th Strategic Missile Squadron.

== History ==
=== World War II ===
==== Initial organization and training ====
The squadron was first organized as a medium bomber unit at Barksdale Field, Louisiana in late June 1942. It was one of the original four squadrons of the 321st Bombardment Group, which were equipped with North American B-25 Mitchells. However, it was not until the squadron moved on paper to Columbia Army Air Base, South Carolina, that the initial cadre was assigned in August 1942

After five months of training, the ground echelon of the squadron departed for the Port of Embarkation at Camp Kilmer, New Jersey on 21 January 1943. It boarded the USS Elizabeth C. Stanton on 7 February. The air echelon of the squadron remained at DeRidder Army Air Base until 12 February, when it flew to Morrison Field, Florida for staging via the South Atlantic ferry route. It departed Morrison for overseas on 15 February 1943.

==== Combat in the Mediterranean Theater ====
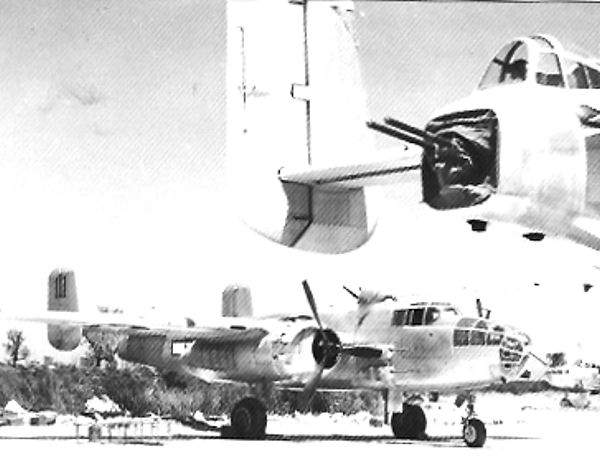
Squadron B-25J Mitchell at Solenzara Airfield, Corsica in late 1944 (Note: Aircraft is North American B-25J-10-NC Mitchell. Note squadron marking III on tail. On 11 November 1944 the aircraft was part of an 18 aircraft formation which attacked three enemy troop convoys with fragmentation bombs in the Brenner Pass. The aircraft was hit by ground fire and about 60% of its right vertical tail was blown off. However, the Mitchell was able to return to its base on Corsica with only a single working rudder. Serial given as 43-27425, but this serial was assigned to a Northwestern built Waco CG-4A-NW. Baugher, Joe (1 September 2023). "1943 USAF Serial Numbers". Joe Baugher.)

The ground echelon landed at Oran, Algeria on 21 February 1943. The air echelon arrived in Algeria at Oujda Airfield on 2 March 43. On 9 March most of the ground and air echelon was united at Oujda. The squadron arrived at its first combat station, Ain M'lila Airfield, Algeria, in March 1943, with the air echelon established there on 12 March. The squadron flew its first combat mission, an attack on a landing ground near Mezzouna Tunisia on 15 March. It initially engaged primarily in air support and interdiction missions, bombing marshalling yards, rail lines, highways, bridges, viaducts, troop concentrations, gun emplacements, shipping, harbors, and other objectives in North Africa. Later, objectives spread into France, Italy, Bulgaria, Yugoslavia, and Greece. It also engaged in psychological warfare missions, dropping propaganda leaflets behind enemy lines.

Until May 1943, it participated in Allied operations against the Axis in Algeria and Tunisia. In June, it moved forward to bases in Tunisia, from which it participated in Operation Corkscrew, the projected invasion of and reduction of Pantelleria and Lampedusa. The following month, it supported Operation Husky, the invasion of Sicily and in September, Operation Avalanche the invasion of mainland Italy near Salerno. On 8 October 1943, the squadron completed a raid on Eleusis Airfield near Athens, despite intense flak and attacks by numerous enemy Messerschmitt Bf 109 and Focke-Wulf Fw 190 interceptor aircraft. For this action it was awarded a Distinguished Unit Citation (DUC).

The squadron provided air support for the Allied advance toward Rome between January and June 1944 and Operation Dragoon, the invasion of Southern France in August 1944. On 18 August, its attacks on Toulon harbor earned the squadron a second DUC. The enemy had concentrated shipping in the harbor to augment harbor defense artillery. Adverse weather conditions caused other groups to turn back, but the 321st Group continued to the target. The squadron pressed its attack despite "heavy, intense, accurate" flak on the bomb run. Post strike reconnaissance showed the 321st Group heavily damaged a battleship, and sunk a cruiser and a submarine.

After September 1944, it supported Allied operations in northern Italy, including Operation Strangle, the effort to choke off supplies for Axis military in Italy through air interdiction and Operation Grapeshot, the Spring 1945 offensive in Northern Italy from September 1944 to April 1945. It remained in Italy after V-E Day, reducing in size as individuals returned to the United States, being reduced to a mere cadre by August 1945 and was inactivated at Pomigliano Airfield on 12 September 1945.

=== Reserve operations ===
The squadron was reactivated as a reserve unit under Air Defense Command (ADC) on 22 June 1947 at Lunken Field, Ohio. It is not clear whether or not the squadron was fully staffed or equipped with operational aircraft during this period. In July 1948 Continental Air Command (ConAC) assumed responsibility for managing reserve and Air National Guard units from ADC. President Truman's reduced 1949 defense budget required reductions in the number of units in the Air Force, and the 447th was inactivated and not replaced as reserve flying operations at Lunken Field ceased.

=== Strategic bomber unit ===
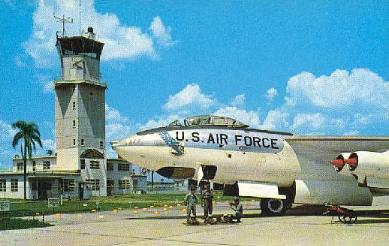
B-47 Stratojet at McCoy AFB

The squadron was reactivated on 15 December 1953 at Pinecastle Air Force Base, Florida, an Air Training Command (ATC) base, where ATC's 3540th Flying Training Wing conducted transition training on Boeing B-47 Stratojet bombers. On 1 January 1954, the base and B-47 training mission were transferred to Strategic Air Command (SAC). (Note: Despite its mission of training bomber crews, the 3540th was designated as the 3540th Flying Training Wing (Fighter). Manning, p. 87. With the transfer to SAC, the 3540th became the 4240th Flying Training Wing and the fighter parenthetical was eliminated.) Under SAC's dual deputy organization, the squadron was assigned directly to the 321st Wing, with the group level organization eliminated. Over the next six months, the B-47 training mission at Pinecastle was phased out and was replaced by the 447th and other operational units of the 321st Bombardment Wing, and the squadron became operational in late May 1954.

The squadron trained in global strategic bombardment operations with the B-47. It deployed with the 321st Wing to RAF Lakenheath, England from December 1954 until March 1955 and to Sidi Slimane Air Base, Morocco From April through July 1956. Starting in 1957, overseas deployments of entire wings were replaced by Operation Reflex. Reflex placed Stratojets and Boeing KC-97 Stratofreighters from multiple wings at bases closer to the Soviet Union for 90 day periods, although individuals rotated back to home bases during unit Reflex deployments. From 1958, SAC B-47 units began to assume an alert posture at their home bases, reducing the amount of time spent on alert at overseas bases, with an initial goal of maintaining one third of SAC's planes on fifteen minute ground alert, fully fueled and ready for combat to reduce vulnerability to a Soviet missile strike.

By 1961, SAC was relying on dispersed Boeing B-52 Stratofortress units as the backbone of its bomber force. The squadron and the rest of the 321st Wing became nonoperational on 15 September 1961 and were replaced by the 4047th Strategic Wing, a B-52 unit. The squadron was inactivated in late October 1961.

==== Intercontinental ballistic missile operations ====
On 1 November 1963 the squadron was redesignated the 447th Strategic Missile Squadron, a SAC intercontinental ballistic missile squadron, but it was not organized at Grand Forks Air Force Base, North Dakota until 1 February 1965. The squadron was the first to be equipped with LGM-30F Minuteman II missiles. The squadron's first missile arrived at Grand Forks on 5 August 1965 and was placed in its sile two days later. Squadron members trained on the new missile at Vandenberg Air Force Base, California during the second half of the year. On 10 October, SAC accepted the first flight of ten Minutemen for the 447th. In January 1966, the squadron placed its first missiles on alert.

The squadron was declared fully operational on 25 April 1966 and placed all its missiles on alert in May. In early December1966, it passed an Operational Readiness Inspection as the entire 321st Wing became operational.

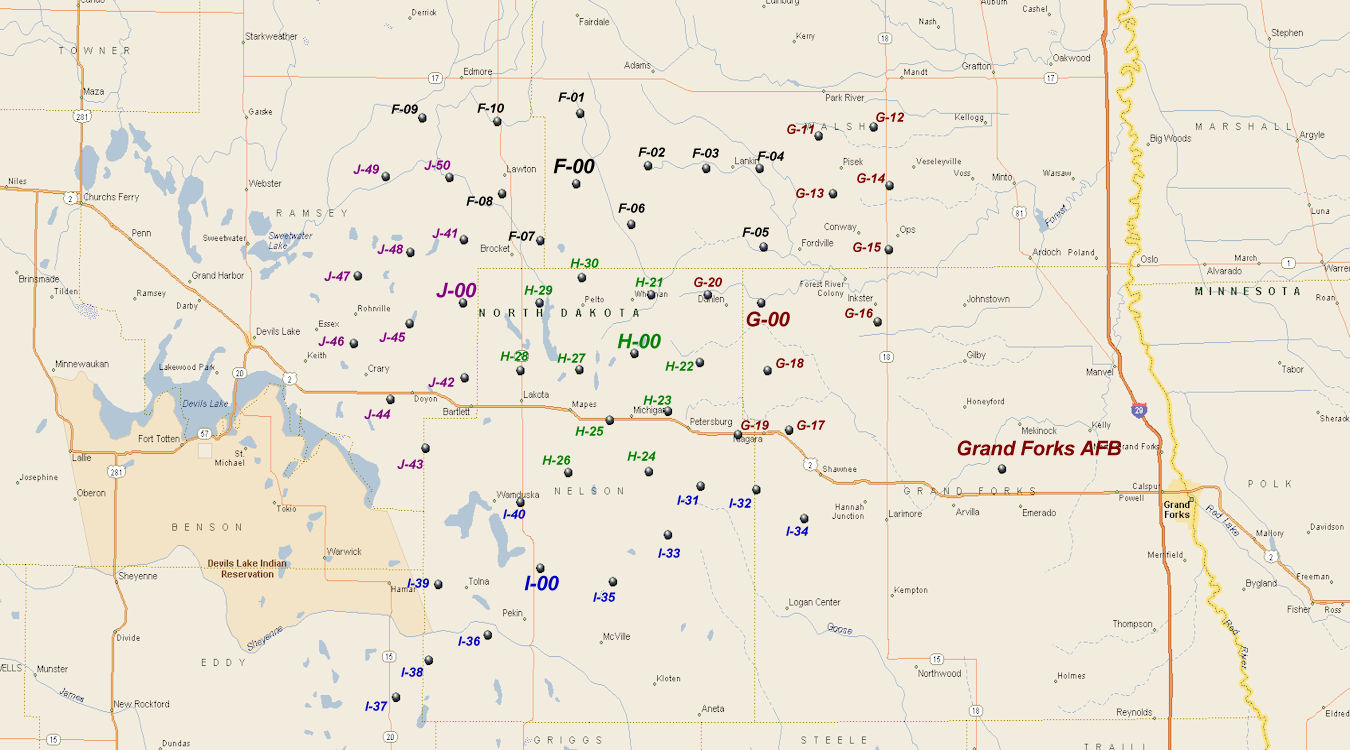
LGM-30 Minuteman Missile Alert and Launch Facilities

447th Missile Squadron Launch Facilities

Missile Alert Facilities (F-K flights, each controlling 10 missiles) are located as follows:

F-00 6.3 mi E of Lawton ND, 48°17′27″N 098°13′52″W
G-00 5.3 mi SW of Fordville ND, 48°09′14″N 097°52′06″W
H-00 5.1 mi N of Michigan ND, 48°05′46″N 098°06′56″W
I-00 6.6 mi ExNE of Tolna ND, 47°50′54″N 098°17′53″W
J-00 6.0 mi SW of Brocket ND, 48°09′14″N 098°27′03″W

In December 1971, the squadron began replacing its Minuteman II missiles with LGM-30G Minuteman IIIs. These missiles were equipped with multiple independently targetable reentry vehicles and penetration aids. The transition was completed in March 1972.

In September 1991, SAC implemented the Air Force's Objective Wing Organization. With this restructuring, the squadron was assigned to the new 321st Operations Group, along with the 321st Wing's other missile squadrons and a support squadron. With this change came a new name, the 447th Missile Squadron, as the Air Force dropped the terms "Strategic" and "Tactical" from the names of its units. The following June, SAC was disestablished and the squadron was transferred to Air Combat Command, along with other intercontinental missile units. This arrangement lasted only a year, for on 1 July 1993, these missile units became part of Air Force Space Command.

The Strategic Arms Limitation Treaty required the United States to reduce the number of missiles in its inventory, and to meet this goal, the 321st Wing was selected for inactivation by the 1995 Base Realignment and Closure Commission. The squadron transferred its Minuteman III missiles to the 341st Missile Wing at Malmstrom Air Force Base, Montana to replace the 341st's Minuteman IIs. It maintained nuclear alert until it was inactivated in July 1998.

== Lineage ==
- Constituted as the 447th Bombardment Squadron (Medium) on 19 June 1942

Activated on 26 June 1942
Redesignated 447th Bombardment Squadron, Medium on 6 March 1944
Inactivated on 12 Sep 1945

- Redesignated 447th Bombardment Squadron, Light on 26 May 1947

Activated in the reserve on 22 June 1947
Inactivated on 27 June 1949

- Redesignated 447th Bombardment Squadron, Medium on 25 November 1953

Activated on 15 December 1953
Discontinued, and inactivated on 25 October 1961

- Redesignated 447th Strategic Missile Squadron (ICBM-Minuteman) and activated on 1 November 1963 (not organized)

Organized on 1 February 1965
Redesignated 447th Missile Squadron on 1 September 1991
Inactivated on 2 July 1998

=== Assignments ===
- 321st Bombardment Group, 26 June 1942 – 12 September 1945
- Eleventh Air Force, (Note: This headquarters is not related to Eleventh Air Force, but was briefly active at Olmsted Air Force Base, Pennsylvania and responsible for managing reserve and National Guard air force units in the Middle Atlantic during the 1940s.) 22 June 1947
- 321st Bombardment Group, 29 June 1947 – 27 June 1949
- 321st Bombardment Wing, 15 December 1953 – 25 October 1961
- Strategic Air Command, 1 November 1963 (not organized)
- 321st Strategic Missile Wing, 1 February 1965
- 321st Operations Group, 1 September 1991
- 321st Missile Group, 1 July 1994 – 2 July 1998

=== Stations ===
- Barksdale Field, Louisiana, 26 June 1942
- Columbia Army Air Base, South Carolina, c. 1 August 1942
- Walterboro Army Air Field, South Carolina, 18 September 1942
- DeRidder Army Air Base, Louisiana, 2 December 1942 – 21 January 1943
- Oujda Airfield, Algeria, 7 March 1943
- Ain M'lila Airfield, Algeria, 12 March 1943
- Souk-el-Arba Airfield, Tunisia, 1 June 1943
- Soliman Airfield, Tunisia, 8 August 1943
- Grottaglie Airfield, Italy, 3 October 1943
- Amendola Airfield, Italy, c. 25 November 1943
- Vincenzo Airfield, Italy, 14 January 1944
- Gaudo Airfield, Italy, 18 February 1944
- Solenzara Airfield, Corsica, 3 May 1944
- Falconara Airfield, Italy, c. 9 May 1945
- Pomigliano Airfield, Italy, c. August – 12 September 1945
- Lunken Field, Ohio, 22 June 1947 – 27 June 1949
- Pinecastle Air Force Base (later McCoy Air Force Base), Florida, 15 December 1953 – 25 October 1961
- Grand Forks Air Force Base, North Dakota, 1 February 1965 – 2 July 1998

=== Aircraft ===
- North American B-25 Mitchell, 1942–1945
- Boeing B-47 Stratojet, 1953–1961
- LGM-30 Minuteman, 1965-1998

=== Awards and campaigns ===
| Award streamer | Award | Dates | Notes |
|---|---|---|---|
| | Distinguished Unit Citation | 8 October 1943 | Athens, Greece; 447th Bombardment Squadron |
| | Distinguished Unit Citation | 18 August 1944 | Toulon, France; 447th Bombardment Squadron |
| | Air Force Outstanding Unit Award | 1 July 1968–30 June 1969 | 447th Strategic Missile Squadron |
| | Air Force Outstanding Unit Award | 1 July 1985–30 June 1987 | 447th Strategic Missile Squadron |
| | Air Force Outstanding Unit Award | 1 October 1996–30 September 1997 | 447th Missile Squadron |

| Campaign Streamer | Campaign | Dates | Notes |
|---|---|---|---|
| | Tunisia | 12 March 1943 – 13 May 1943 | 447th Bombardment Squadron |
| | Air Combat, EAME Theater | 12 March 1943 – 11 May 1945 | 447th Bombardment Squadron |
| | Sicily | 14 May 1943 – 17 August 1943 | 447th Bombardment Squadron |
| | Naples-Foggia | 18 August 1943 – 21 January 1944 | 447th Bombardment Squadron |
| | Rome-Arno | 22 January 1944 – 9 September 1944 | 447th Bombardment Squadron |
| | Central Europe | 22 March 1944 – 21 May 1945 | 447th Bombardment Squadron |
| | Southern France | 15 August 1944 – 14 September 1944 | 447th Bombardment Squadron |
| | North Apennines | 10 September 1944 – 4 April 1945 | 447th Bombardment Squadron |
| | Po Valley | 3 April 1945 – 8 May 1945 | 447th Bombardment Squadron |

== See also ==
- List of United States Air Force missile squadrons
- 447th Missile Squadron Launch Facilities
- List of B-47 units of the United States Air Force
