= Falconara =

Falconara may refer to:

- Falconara Airbase, a joint-use civil airport and Italian Air Force
- Falconara Albanese, a town and comune in the province of Cosenza in the Calabria region of southern Italy
- Falconara Marittima, a seaside resort on the Adriatic coast, in Italy, in the Marche region, province Ancona
