= 321st Air Expeditionary Wing =

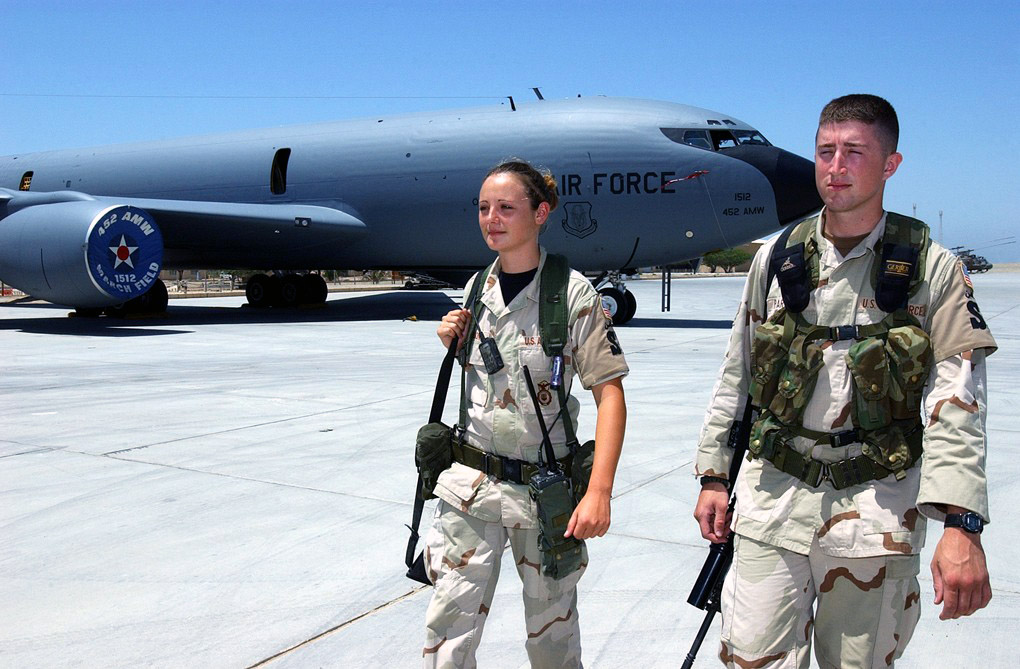
- 321st Expeditionary Security Forces Squadron airmen patrol the flight line
- Active: 1942–1945; 1947–1949; 1953–1961; 1964–1998; 2001–2011
- Country: United States
- Branch: United States Air Force
- Type: Air expeditionary
- Role: Combat support
- Part of: USAFCENT
- Mottos: Perseverance, Vision and Duty (1942–1952); Pax Per Potentiam (Latin for 'Peace Through Power') (1953–1961); Skill – Professionalism – Determination (after 1965); Global Power for Peace (by 1995)
- Engagements: World War II: European Campaign; Global War on Terrorism: Operation Iraqi Freedom, Operation New Dawn

Commanders
- Notable commanders: Lance W. Lord

Insignia
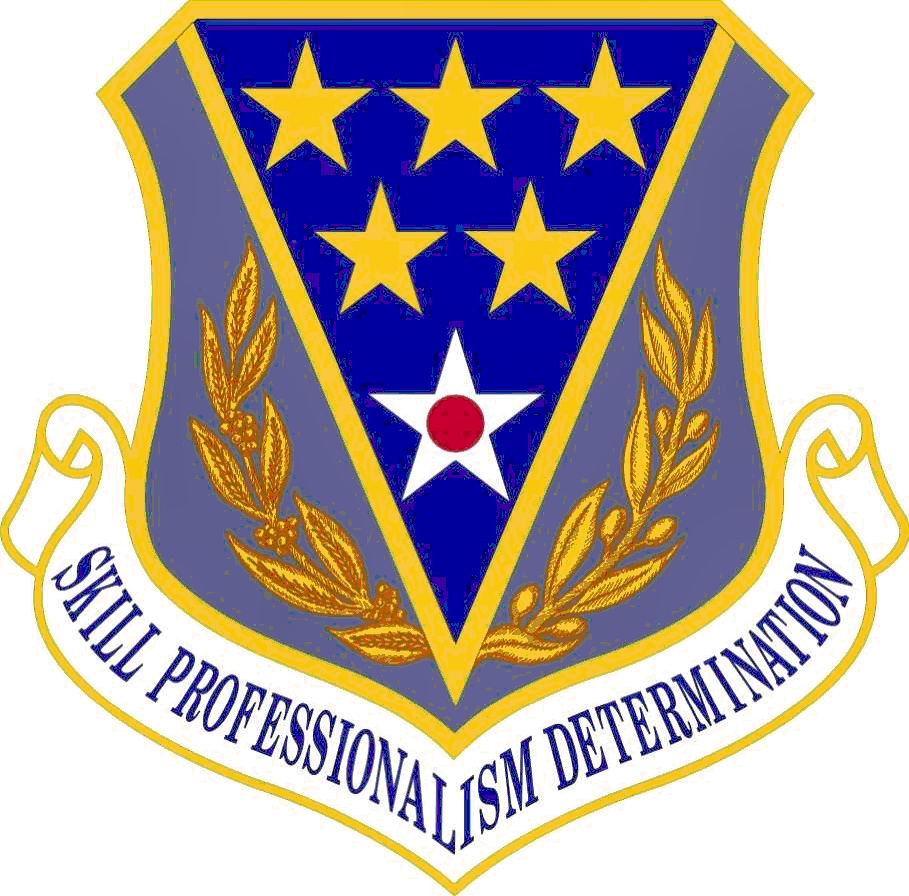
- 321st Air Expeditionary Wing emblem (Note: Approved 27 December 1965, restored unnown. Description: Light blue, on a pile [dark blue] fimbriated gold between in base a wreath of laurel in dexter and a wreath of olive in sinister, each of eight leaves gold garnished brown, six stars three, two, gold and one white with a red disc in center; all within a diminished bordure gold. Significance: The six stars on the pile represent instantaneous response to orders. The pile [triangle] depicts the early wedge-shaped battle formation while the stars, three-two-one, reflect the countdown and blast-off of missile warfare and also the wing’s numerical designation. The wing's WWII honors are commemorated with the laurel; the olive wreath represents peace and SAC's goal of "Power for Peace" and indicates the unit’s high level of responsibility which is also denoted in its motto.)

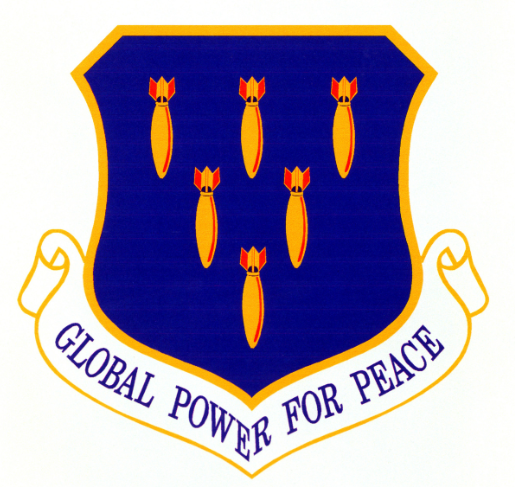
- 321st Missile Group emblem (Note: Restored and modified 1 July 1994.)

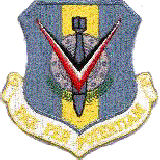
- 321st Bombardment Wing emblem (Note: Approved 30 August 1954.)

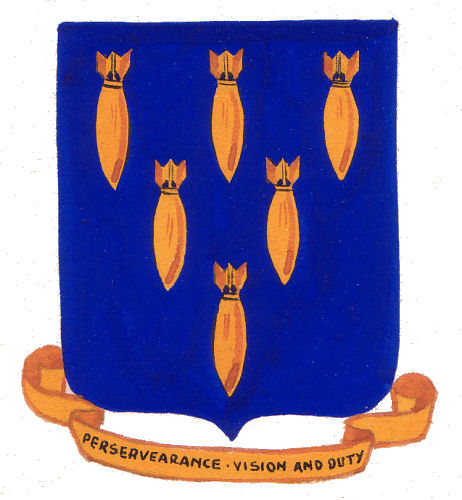
- 321st Bombardment Group emblem (Note: Approved 7 November 1942. Description: Azure, six drop bombs, three, two and one or.)

The 321st Air Expeditionary Wing was a United States Air Force unit assigned United States Air Forces Central, the USAF component command of United States Central Command. The unit was reestablished on 1 November 2008 and was a nexus of all Coalition Air Force Training Teams and the Iraqi Air Force at COB Speicher. It was previously the 321st Bombardment Group (Medium), which flew B-25 Mitchells in combat with the Northwest African Strategic Air Force in 1943 and the Mediterranean Allied Tactical Air Force in 1944–45.

It became a Strategic Missile Wing, and later the 321st Air Expeditionary Group. In 2001, the wing was converted to provisional status and allocated to Air Combat Command. It was believed to be active between 2001 and 2004, and deployed to Masirah Air Base, Oman. Its operational component was believed to be the 355th Air Expeditionary Group.

== History ==
=== World War II ===
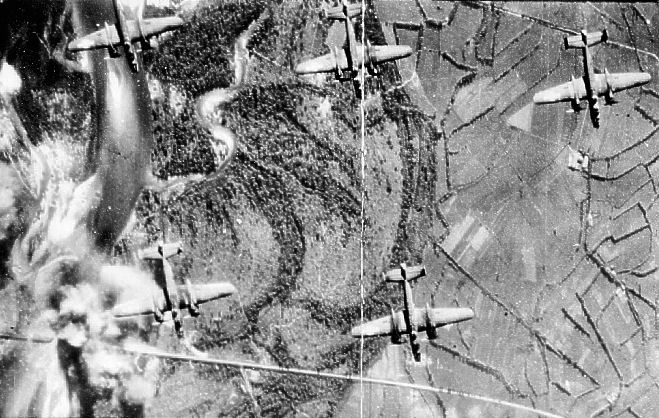
B-25 Mitchells of the 321st Bomb Group over Italy, 1944

Constituted as 321st Bombardment Group (Medium) on 19 June 1942 and activated on 26 June at Barksdale Field, Louisiana. The group's operational squadrons were the 445th, 446th, 447th and 448th Bombardment Squadrons. The group was assigned to the 12th Air Force of the United States Army Air Forces.

The group trained for overseas duty with North American B-25 Mitchell medium bombers at several Third Air Force training bases in the southeast. Was assigned and deployed to the Mediterranean theater in January 1943, arriving in Algeria in March. The 321st was assigned to Twelfth Air Force.

In North Africa, the 321st engaged primarily in support and interdictory operations, bombing marshalling yards, rail lines, highways, bridges, viaducts, troop concentrations, gun emplacements, shipping, harbors, and other objectives in North Africa. Later targets shifted to Southern France, Sicily, Italy, Bulgaria, Yugoslavia, and Greece.

The 321st also engaged in psychological warfare missions, dropping propaganda leaflets behind enemy lines. Took part in the Allied operations against Axis forces in North Africa during March–May 1943, the reduction of Pantelleria and Lampedusa in June, the invasion of Sicily in July, the landing at Salerno in September, the Allied advance toward Rome during January–June 1944, the invasion of Southern France in August 1944, and the Allied operations in northern Italy from September 1944 to April 1945.

The group received two Distinguished Unit Citations: for completing a raid on an aerodrome near Athens, 8 October 1943, in spite of intense flak and attacks by numerous enemy interceptors; and for bombing a battleship, a cruiser, and a submarine in Toulon harbor on 18 August 1944 to assist the Allied invasion of Southern France.

The 321st Bombardment Group was disbanded near Pomigliano d'Arco, Italy on 12 September 1945. It was later briefly activated as part of the reserve at Mansfield Airport, Ohio as the 321st Bombardment Group (Light) (June 1947 – June 1949).

=== Bombardment Wing ===
On 15 December 1953, the 321st Bombardment Wing, Medium was activated at Pinecastle Air Force Base, Florida, absorbing the Boeing B-47 Stratojets and Boeing KC-97 tankers of the discontinued 4240th Flying Training Wing in late May 1954. Two weeks later, on 1 January 1954, the wing was assigned to Strategic Air Command (SAC) as the B-47 combat crew training mission was transferred to SAC. Colonel Michael N.W. McCoy was appointed commander of the 321st Bombardment Wing on 24 May 1954. He previously commanded the 306th Bombardment Wing at MacDill Air Force Base, Florida, and was considered the "dean" of SAC's Stratojet operational wing commanders.

Known squadrons of the 321st Bomb Wing were:

- 445th, 446th, 447th, 448th Bombardment Squadron (1 June 1954 – 24 October 1961)
- 307th Air Refueling Squadron (28 September – 8 November 1954)
  - Redesignated: 321st Air Refueling Squadron (8 November 1954 – 16 September 1956)

In November 1957, the 321st and Pinecastle were host to the medium bombers participating in the annual SAC Bombing Navigation and Reconnaissance Competition. During the competition, a B-47 aircraft mishap north of downtown Orlando took the lives of Colonel McCoy, Group Captain John Woodroffe of the Royal Air Force, Lieutenant Colonel Charles Joyce and Major Vernon Stuff during preparations for the event. Despite this tragedy, the 321st Wing, under the direction of its new commander, Colonel Robert W. Strong, Jr., won the top honors of the meet, including the coveted Fairchild and McCoy trophies, distinguishing the 321st as the top B-47 Wing in SAC.

On 7 May 1958 Pinecastle was renamed McCoy Air Force Base in memory of the late Colonel McCoy. Formal dedication ceremonies were held on 21 May 1958 in conjunction with a mammoth open house, during which an estimated 30,000 Central Floridians attended.

In the summer of 1961, a complete reorganization of McCoy began as a program commenced to convert the base from B-47 Stratojet operations to Boeing B-52 Stratofortress heavy bombers and Boeing KC-135 Stratotankers. The 321st Wing began phasing out its operations in June 1961 and was inactivated in October 1961. Its operations at McCoy were temporarily assumed by the 4047th Strategic Wing until replaced by the 306th Bombardment Wing when the latter organization relocated from MacDill Air Force Base, Florida in 1963.

=== Strategic Missile Wing ===
On 1 November 1963, 321st Strategic Missile Wing was organized as the first SAC LGM-30 Minuteman II intercontinental ballistic missile wing, at Grand Forks Air Force Base, North Dakota.

During 1965, the wing's three missile squadrons were activated and crew training and certification began at Vandenberg Air Force Base, California. In August 1965, the base received its first Minuteman II missile, shipped by train from Assembly Plant 77 at Hill Air Force Base, Utah. During the following March, the base received the first Minuteman II to be shipped via aircraft, an Air Force first.

On 25 April 1966, the 447th Strategic Missile Squadron and its 50 Minuteman II missiles were declared operational. Additional flights came on line throughout 1966. On 7 December 1966, the wing, with its component 446th, 447th, and 448th Strategic Missile Squadrons, became fully operational with a complement of 150 Minuteman missiles.

As the first base to deploy Minuteman II missiles, Grand Forks hosted "Project Long Life II," a unique reliability test in which modified Minuteman missiles were fueled to travel a few hundred yards. The first launch from a Grand Forks silo occurred on 19 October 1966 and was declared unsuccessful. Nine days later, a second attempt also failed. A third attempt under "Project Giant Boost" occurred in August 1968 and again proved unsuccessful.

Crews from the 321st competed in SAC's first Missile Combat Competition held at Vandenberg Air Force Base from 2 through 7 April 1967. Later that month, members from the wing launched its first Minuteman II from Vandenberg.

From December 1971 to March 1973, the wing converted to Minuteman III missiles. These missiles represented a significant technological advancement, having multiple independently targetable reentry vehicles (MIRVs). Coordinating the missile changeover required complex planning and execution. In 1972 alone, 250 separate nuclear weapon convoys motored over the roads of North Dakota.

Modifications continued that enhanced readiness and improved survivability. For instance, about mid-August 1975, "Wing Six Integrated Program" (WSIP) was implemented. WSIP included a silo upgrade that improved the missile suspension system to withstand greater blast-shock and provided the 321st with a remote targeting capability.

The wing underwent continual readiness inspections and participated in numerous training exercises on base and at Vandenberg. Training improved with the expansion of on-base simulator facilities. For example, in 1970, wing crews conducted tests using "Modified Operational Missiles" which enabled them to exercise all aspects of a missile launch except igniting the engine.

Mother Nature often threatened wing readiness. The organizational history referred to "the Great Blizzard of '66," " the storm of '75 that caused $10,000 in damages," and "one of the harshest winters 1977 which 'hampered maintenance efforts' and had 'ice storms snapping power lines'." When the heavy snows melted, floods occasionally resulted. A quick thaw in April 1979 created one of the most devastating floods within the Red River valley basin during this century. In addition to protecting the silos from flood waters, wing personnel volunteered to join the mostly successful 2-week struggle to keep Grand Forks and East Grand Forks dry. This effort was repeated in April 1989.

=== Strategic Missile Group ===
With the restructuring of the Air Force and the disestablishment of SAC in the early 1990s the wing first came under Air Combat Command in 1992 and then under Air Force Space Command in 1993.

In March 1995, the Base Realignment and Closure Commission selected the 321st Strategic Missile Wing for inactivation. The wing was downgraded to group status, and the 321st Missile Group was given a dual mission: To operate, maintain and secure combat-ready ICBM forces for the National Command Authority and to safely and securely transfer its alert responsibilities to the 341st Missile Wing at Malmstrom Air Force Base, Montana.

When the decision was made to reduce the ICBM force, all of Grand Forks was placed on the 1995 Base Realignment and Closure list. While the base and its air refueling wing under the newly established Air Mobility Command survived, the missile field and 321st did not. The 321st Missile Group inactivated on 30 September 1998.

=== 321st Air Expeditionary Group ===
Converted to provisional status and activated as 321st Air Expeditionary Group in 2001. From 2001, the unit was believed to operate RQ-1 Predator reconnaissance unmanned aerial vehicles against the Taliban and Al-Qaeda as part of Operation Enduring Freedom - Afghanistan. It was believed to be stationed at Jacobabad Air Base, Pakistan. The 52d Expeditionary Flying Training Squadron was attached to the group.

=== 321st Air Expeditionary Wing ===
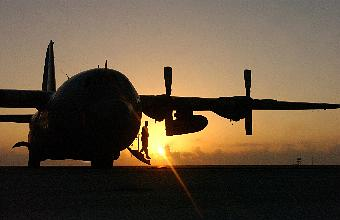
A 321st Expeditionary Maintenance Squadron crew chief, emerges from a C-130 Hercules after conducting a pre-flight inspection.

The Air Force activated the 321st in August 2002 as the 321st Air Expeditionary Wing, assigned to AFCENT. The wing inactivated in 2004, but was activated again in 2008 to assume the mission of Iraq Training and Advisory Mission (ITAM)-Air Force. Under the ITAM-Air Force mission, the 321st Air Expeditionary Wing trained, advised, and assisted the Iraqi Air Force to develop as a professional and credible regional airpower partner, with the foundational and enduring capabilities to maintain internal security and defend against external threats; provide aerial port, airfield operations, base and medical support, and command and control in support of United States Forces - Iraq (USF-I). On order, it transitioned designated missions, organizations and functions to other U.S. Government agencies no later than 31 December 2011.

On the evening of 31 August 2010, a C-130 crew completed the last mission of a U.S. aircraft in support of Operation Iraqi Freedom (OIF) as they departed from Ali Al Salem Air Base, Kuwait, for Sather Air Base, Baghdad International Airport, Iraq. That same aircrew flew back to Kuwait, refueled, and then returned to Sather AB on 1 September to complete the first sortie of an American aircraft in support of Operation New Dawn. Under Operation New Dawn, American combat forces redeployed from the country, and the focus for the remaining U.S. Forces-Iraq shifted to train, mentor, advise and assist the armed forces of Iraq in preparation for the exit of U.S. military forces from Iraq in December 2011.

While Operation New Dawn brought a shift in mission for many of the remaining forces in Iraq, the 321st AEW and ITAM-Air Force were poised to continue their mission to train, mentor, advise and assist the Iraqi Air Force to develop into a professional and credible regional airpower partner. When the Iraqi Ministry of Defense (IqMOD) made the decision to split fixed-wing and rotary-wing operations in late 2010, the Iraqi Army Aviation Command (IqAAC) was created. Because U.S. Airmen continued to advise for both the Iraqi Air Force and the IqAAC, the name was changed from ITAM-Air Force to ITAM-Air and addressed the fully comprehensive scope of training.

The wing and ITAM-Air encouraged the development of Iraqi airpower to maintain internal security and defend against external threats. At the same time, the 321st provided aerial port, airfield operations, base and medical support, in addition to command and control capabilities to support USF-I. The wing and ITAM-Air also prepared to transition designated missions and functions to other U.S. government agencies and the Iraqi Air Force no later than December 2011.

The 321st consists of four groups, geographically separated from wing headquarters; the 321st Air Expeditionary Advisory Group headquartered at Kirkuk Air Base, the 321st Expeditionary Mission Support Advisory Group with headquarters at Tikrit, the 407th Air Expeditionary Group at Ali Air Base and the 447th Air Expeditionary Group at Sather Air Base.

At the beginning of October 2010, the commanding general of USF-I issued his operational guidance for the entire command following the completion under the first month of Operation New Dawn. The general stressed that "we will demonstrate our commitment through a continued partnership with the Iraqis. We will help the Iraqis develop their capability to provide for their own national defense."

In April 2010, the 407th Group at Ali Air Base and the 447th Group at Sather Air Base realigned for drawdown operations leading up to Operation New Dawn.

On 6 January 2011, Brigadier General Anthony J. Rock, who most recently served as Air Command and Staff College commandant and Spaatz Center for Officer Education vice commander, assumed command of the 321st Wing and ITAM-Air. The general urged those under his command to finish strong as the 31 December 2011, deadline established under the 2008 U.S.-Iraq Status of Forces Agreement quickly approaches.

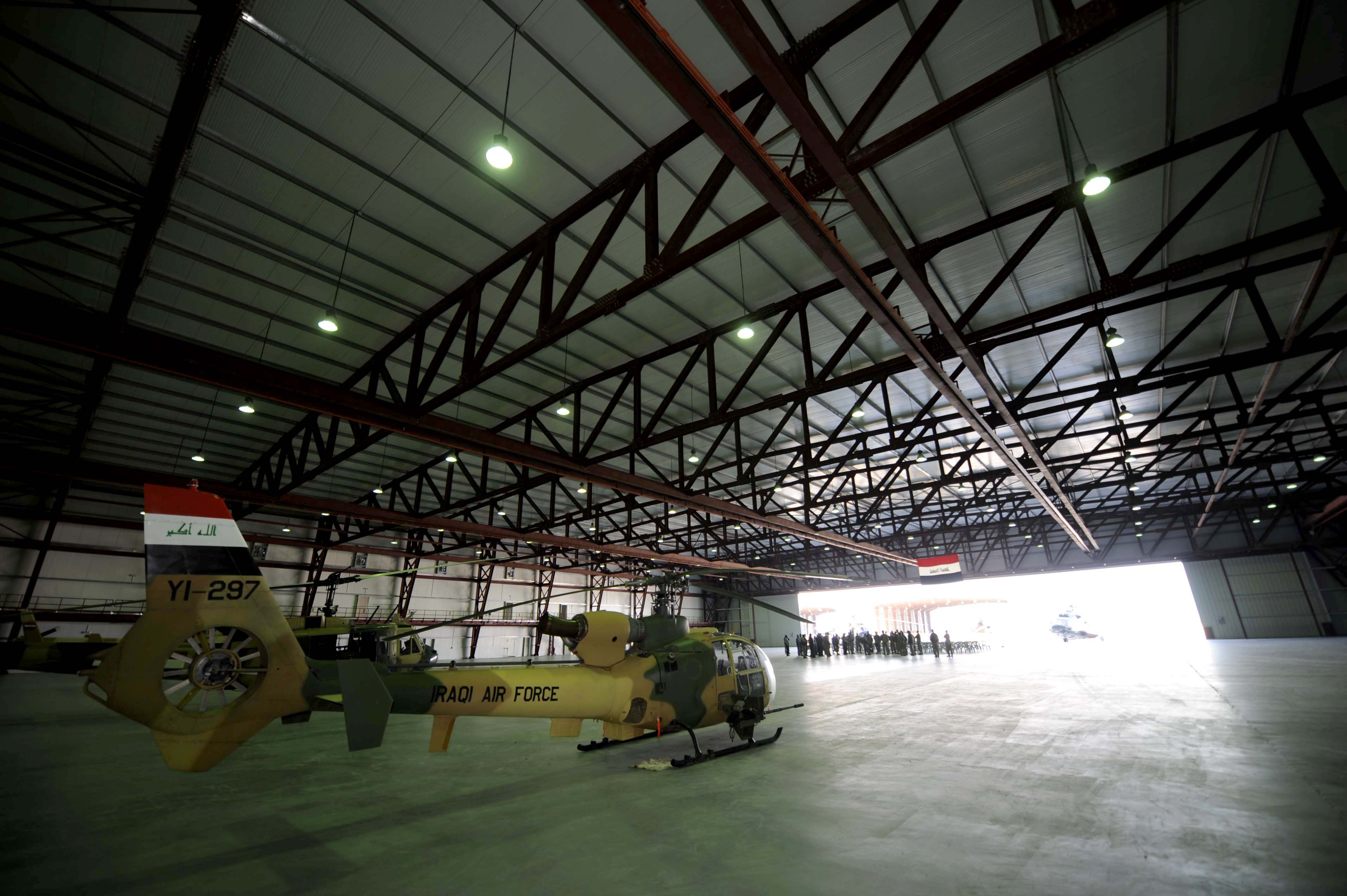
An Iraqi Gazelle helicopter is dwarfed by the largest maintenance hangar in Iraq and the largest clear-span building in the entire Middle East. The hangar was built by a local Iraqi company and managed by the U.S. Army Corps of Engineers with 321st Air Expeditionary Wing advisors monitoring the project, advocating requirements on behalf of Iraqis.

The Iraqi Army Aviation Command held a ribbon cutting ceremony in Taji on 17 January 2011 to formally begin operations in their newest maintenance facility. The massive aircraft hangar is a $9.8 million project that began in 2009. The collaboration between the IqAAC and the United States provided a maintenance hangar large enough for current and growing future aviation mission requirements. At more than 240 feet long and 50 feet tall, the hangar is the largest maintenance hangar in Iraq and the largest clear-span building in the entire Middle East. The hangar bay is large enough to support multiple airframes and activities that have a logical work flow relationship simultaneously. It is also part of a larger complex that includes numerous offices and maintenance shops.

The wing was inactivated on 22 December 2011 following the withdraw of US forces from Iraq and the cessation of Operation New Dawn.

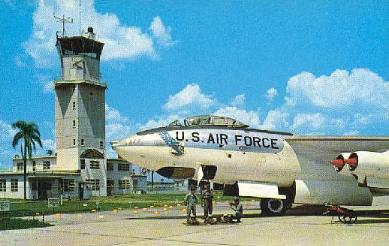
Postcard from Pinecastle AFB, Florida in the mid-1950s, showing Boeing B-47E-90-BW Stratojet AF Serial No. 52-0477 of the 321st Bomb Wing on the ramp. This aircraft was sent to Aerospace Maintenance and Regeneration Center in November 1964.

== Lineage ==
321st Bombardment Group

- Constituted as the 321st Bombardment Group (Medium) on 19 June 1942

Activated on 26 June 1942
Redesignated 321st Bombardment Group, Medium on 31 August 1944
Inactivated on 12 September 1945
Redesignated 321st Bombardment Group, Light
Activated in the Reserve on 29 June 1947
Inactivated on 27 June 1949
Consolidated with the 321st Strategic Missile Wing as the 321st Strategic Missile Wing on 31 January 1984

321st Air Expeditionary Wing

- Established as the 321st Bombardment Wing, Medium on 23 March 1953

Activated on 15 December 1953
Discontinued and inactivated on 25 October 1961
Redesignated 321st Strategic Missile Wing and activated, on 14 August 1964 (not organized)
Organized on 1 November 1964
Consolidated with the 321st Bombardment Group on 31 January 1984
Redesignated 321st Missile Wing on 1 September 1991
Redesignated 321st Missile Group on 1 July 1994
Inactivated on 30 September 1998
Redesignated as 321st Air Expeditionary Group, converted to provisional status and assigned to Air Combat Command to activate or inactivate any time after 1 October 2001
Redesignated as 321st Air Expeditionary Wing on 20 August 2002
Inactivated on 22 December 2011
Transferred authority from the 321st Air Expeditionary Wing to the 321st Air Expeditionary Group at Al Asad Air Base, Iraq, July. 2, 2020.

== Assignments ==
- III Bomber Command, 26 June 1942 – 21 January 1943
- 47th Bombardment Wing, 12 March 1943 (attached to Northwest African Strategic Air Force after May 1943)
- 57th Bombardment Wing, 8 August 1943 – 12 September 1945 (attached to Northwest African Strategic Air Force until September 1943, Mediterranean Allied Tactical Bomber Force Jan 44 – Feb 44)
- Eleventh Air Force, 29 June 1947
- 12th Bombardment Wing (Later 12th Air Division), 1 October 1947 – 27 June 1949
- Second Air Force, 15 December 1953 (attached to Air Division Provisional, 813th after 11 June 1954)
- 813th Air Division, 15 July 1954 (attached to 7th Air Division 9 December 1954 – 5 March 1955, 5th Air Division, 9 April – 3 July 1956)
- 6th Air Division, 1 January 1959
- Eighth Air Force, 1 February 1959
- 6th Air Division, 1 July 1959
- 823d Air Division, 6 February – 25 October 1961
- 4th Strategic Aerospace Division (later 4th Strategic Missile Division, 4th Air Division), 1 November 1964
- 57th Air Division, 22 January 1975 – 30 September 1998
- Air Combat Command, 1 October 2001

Probably attached to Air Forces Central

- 1st Air Expeditionary Task Force 28 July 2021

== Components ==
Groups

- 355th Air Expeditionary Group (2001–2004) (Dates Unconfirmed)
- 321st Air Expeditionary Advisory Group

Squadrons

- 307th Air Refueling Squadron: attached 28 September – 8 November 1954
- 321st Air Expeditionary Advisory Squadron: unknown
- 321st Air Refueling Squadron: 8 November 1954 – 16 September 1956

Stationed at Maxwell Air Force Base, Alabama

- 445th Bombardment Squadron: 19 June 1942 – 12 September 1945; 29 June 1947 – 27 June 1949, 15 December 1953 – 25 October 1961
- 446th Bombardment Squadron (later 446th Strategic Missile Squadron, 446th Missile Squadron): 19 June 1942 – 12 September 1945; 29 June 1947 – 27 June 1949; 15 December 1953 – 25 October 1961; 1 July 1965 – 30 September 1998
- 447th Bombardment Squadron (later 447th Strategic Missile Squadron, 447th Missile Squadron): 19 June 1942 – 12 September 1945; 29 June 1947 – 27 June 1949 15 December 1953 – 25 October 1961; 1 February 1965 – 30 September 1998
- 448th Bombardment Squadron (later 448th Strategic Missile Squadron, 448th Missile Squadron): 19 June 1942 – 12 September 1945; 29 June 1947 – 27 June 1949; 1 February 1954 – 25 October 1961; 15 September 1965 – 30 September 1998

== Stations ==
- Barksdale Field, Louisiana, 26 June 1942
- Columbia Army Air Base, South Carolina, c. 1 August 1942
- Walterboro Army Air Field, South Carolina, September 1942
- DeRidder Army Air Base, Louisiana, c. 1 December 1942 – 21 January 1943
- Ain M'lila Airfield, Algeria, 12 March 1943
- Souk-el-Arba Airfield, Tunisia, c. 1 June 1943
- Soliman Airfield, Tunisia, 8 August 1943
- Grottaglie Airfield, Italy, October 1943
- Amendola Airfield, Italy, c. 20 November 1943
- Vincenzo Airfield, Italy, 14 January 1944
- Gaudo Airfield, Italy, February 1944
- Corsica, 23 April 1944
- Falconara Airfield, Italy, 1 April 1945
- Pomigliano Airfield, Italy, c. September-12 September 1945
- Mansfield Municipal Airport, Ohio, 29 June 1947 – 27 June 1949
- Pinecastle Air Force Base (later McCoy Air Force Base), Florida, 15 December 1953 – 25 October 1961
- Grand Forks Air Force Base, North Dakota 1 November 1964 – 30 September 1998
- Masirah Island Air Base, Oman (2001–2004) (Dates Unconfirmed)
- Al Asad Air Base, Iraq, July 2, 2020 - June 16, 2021
- Fort Lee, Virginia, 28 July 28 2021

== Aircraft and missiles ==
- North American B-25 Mitchell, 1942–1945
- Boeing B-47 Stratojet, 1954–1961
- Boeing KC-97 Stratotanker, 1954–1956
- Douglas C-124 Globemaster II, 1959–1961
- LGM-30F Minuteman II, 1965–1973
- LGM-30G Minuteman III, 1972–1998

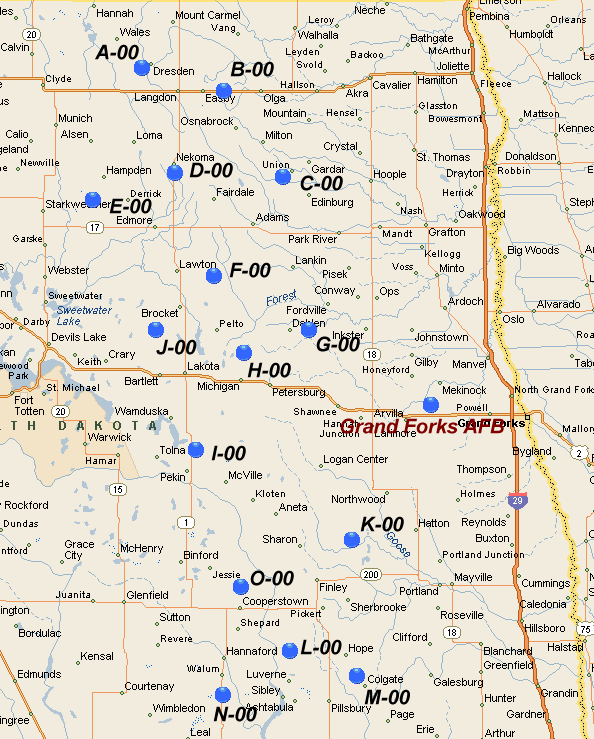
LGM-30 Minuteman III Missile Alert Facilities

LGM-30 Minuteman III Missile Alert Facilities (MAF) (each controlling 10 missiles) are located as follows:

446th Missile Squadron

A-00 6.7 mi SE of Wales ND, 48°49′17″N 098°30′48″W
B-00 6.8 mi NxNW of Osnabrock ND, 48°45′49″N 098°11′36″W
C-00 5.7 mi NW of Edinburg ND, 48°32′43″N 097°57′50″W
D-00 1.7 mi SxSW of Nekoma ND, 48°33′14″N 098°22′50″W
E-00 4.3 mi SxSW of Hampden ND, 48°29′01″N 098°41′46″W

447th Missile Squadron

F-00 6.3 mi E of Lawton ND, 48°17′27″N 098°13′52″W
G-00 5.3 mi SW of Fordville ND, 48°09′14″N 097°52′06″W
H-00 5.1 mi N of Michigan ND, 48°05′46″N 098°06′56″W
I-00 6.6 mi ExNE of Tolna ND, 47°50′54″N 098°17′53″W
J-00 6.0 mi SW of Brocket ND, 48°09′14″N 098°27′03″W

448th Missile Squadron

K-00 9.6 mi NE of Finley ND, 47°37′01″N 097°42′14″W
L-00 10.5 mi W of Hope ND, 47°20′03″N 097°56′24″W
M-00 3.8 mi SxSE of Hope ND, 47°16′17″N 097°41′19″W
N-00 6.1 mi S of Hannaford ND, 47°13′24″N 098°11′30″W
O-00 3.6 mi N of Cooperstown ND, 47°29′51″N 098°07′37″W

== Campaigns ==
- Air Combat, European-African-Middle Eastern Theater
- Tunisia
- Sicily
- Naples-Foggia
- Rome-Arno
- Southern France
- North Apennines
- Central Europe
- Po Valley

== Commanders ==
- Unknown, Jun–Aug 1942
- Col William C Mills, 3 August 1942
- Col Robert D. Knapp, Sep 1942
- Lt Col Charles T Olmsted, 5 December 1943
- Lt Col Peter H Remington, 18 March 1944
- Col Richard H Smith, 26 March 1944
- Lt Col Charles F Cassidy Jr, 28 Jan 1945 – unknown
- Col Christopher G Clark, 2 July 2020 - 16 June 2021
- Col Jennifer T. Baggott, 28 July 2021

== See also ==
- List of B-47 units of the United States Air Force
- 321st Missile Wing LGM-30 Minuteman Missile Launch Sites

== Bibliography ==
- Rogers, B. (2006). United States Air Force Unit Designations Since 1978. ISBN 1-85780-197-0
- World Airpower Journal. (1992). US Air Force Air Power Directory. Aerospace Publishing: London, UK. ISBN 1-880588-01-3
- Grand Forks AFB, North Dakota
- Grand Forks AFB Minuteman Missile Site Coordinates
- Maurer, Maurer (1983). Air Force Combat Units of World War II. Maxwell AFB, Alabama: Office of Air Force History. ISBN 0-89201-092-4.
- Ravenstein, Charles A. (1984). Air Force Combat Wings Lineage and Honors Histories 1947–1977. Maxwell AFB, Alabama: Office of Air Force History. ISBN 0-912799-12-9.
- War on Terrorism forces
