= Taranto-Grottaglie Airport =

Taranto-Grottaglie Airport Aeroporto di Taranto-Grottaglie

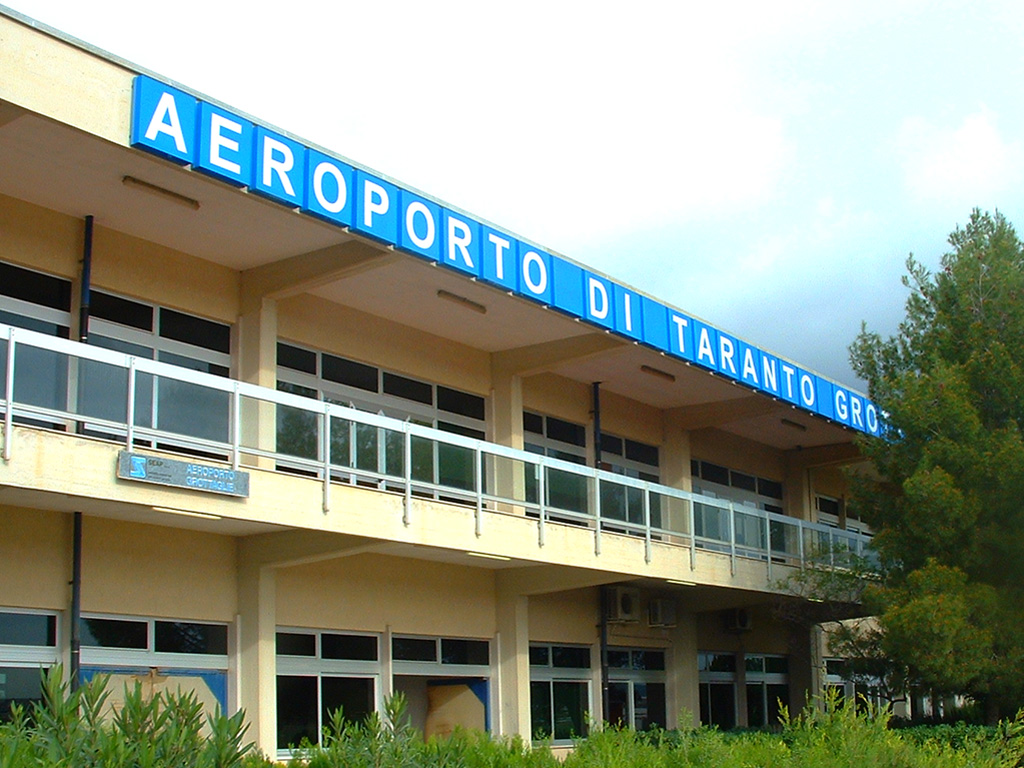
- IATA: TAR; ICAO: LIBG

Summary
- Airport type: Public
- Serves: Taranto / Grottaglie, Italy
- Elevation AMSL: 215 ft (66 m)
- Coordinates: 40°31′03″N 017°24′11″E

Map
- Location of airport in Italy

Runways
Direction	Length		Surface
Direction	m	ft	Surface
17/35	3,200	10,500	Asphalt

Statistics (2024)
- Passengers: 1,005
- Passenger change 23-24: ▼10.0%
- Aircraft movements: 865
- Movements change 23-24: ▼ -13.8%
- Cargo (tons): 2,216
- Cargo change 23-24: ▲29.5%
- Source: DAFIF; Statistics from Assaeroporti

Taranto-Grottaglie "Marcello Arlotta" Airport (Italian: Aeroporto di Taranto-Grottaglie "Marcello Arlotta") (IATA: TAR, ICAO: LIBG) is an airport serving Taranto and Grottaglie, both comunes in the province of Taranto in Italy. The airport is located 1.5 kilometres (0.9 mi) from the city of Monteiasi, 4 km (2.5 mi) from Grottaglie and 16 km (9.9 mi) from Taranto. It is named for Marcello Arlotta (1886–1918), an Italian aviator.

== Overview ==
The airport is used for general aviation, with no commercial airline service. As Alenia Aeronautica produces big fuselage parts of the Boeing 787 Dreamliner in a hangar located beside an airport's apron, multiple times a month, a Boeing 747 Large Cargo Freighter, also known as Dreamlifter, lands at Taranto Grottaglie to pick up the parts and fly them to the Boeing factory at Boeing South Carolina at Charleston International Airport for final assembly. Those flights are operated by Atlas Air. It is also known as Taranto-Grottaglie Airport or Grottaglie Airport. In August 2012, the broker ESAFLY announced that it plans to commence scheduled services from Taranto.

== History ==
In 1923 Grottaglie was a military airfield of Regia Aeronautica. During World War II, it was used by Regia Aeronautica and after the Allied invasion of Italy by the United States Army Air Forces (USAAF), and by the British Royal Air Force (RAF). The airfield was designed for heavy bomber use, and was a major base for Fifteenth Air Force B-24 Liberator heavy bombers used in the strategic bombardment campaign against Germany. In addition, Twelfth Air Force tactical bombers were stationed at the airfield which were used to support Allied ground forces in the Italian Campaign.

Known USAAF units assigned to the airfield were:

- 47th Bombardment Group, 24 Sep-15 Oct 1943, A-20 Havoc (12 AF)
- 321st Bombardment Group, 15 Oct-20 Nov 1943, B-25 Mitchell (12 AF)
- 5th Reconnaissance Group, (F-5 (P-38) Lightning), November 1943 - 28 December 1944
- 449th Bombardment Group, 4 Jan 1944-16 May 1945, B-24 Liberator (15 AF)
- 416th Night Fighter Squadron, 30 Sep 1943-28 Jan 1944, Bristol Beaufighter (12 AF)

Royal Air Force units included:

- No. 6 Squadron RAF, February–July 1944
- No. 14 Squadron RAF (detachment), October 1943–July 1944
- No. 38 Squadron RAF, December 1944–February 1945
- No. 92 Squadron RAF, September 1943
- No. 112 Squadron RAF, September 1943
- No. 126 Squadron RAF, October 1943–April 1944
- No. 185 Squadron RAF (detachment), February 1944–August 1944
- No. 221 Squadron RAF, March 1944–October 1944
- No. 249 Squadron RAF, December 1943–July 1944
- No. 250 Squadron RAF, September 1943
- No. 255 Squadron RAF, November 1943–January 1944
- No. 624 Squadron RAF, December 1944–February 1945

Soon after the airport had been seized by the Allies in September 1943, 205th Battery from 89th (Cinque Ports) Heavy Anti-Aircraft Regiment, Royal Artillery, arrived to protect the USAAF build-up.

After the war ended, the airfield was turned over to local authorities, and in 1950 it was the air base of 86º Gruppo Antisom (Antisubmarine Warfare Wing) of the Italian Air Force. In 1979 it was a naval air station of the Italian Navy.

== Facilities ==
The airport resides at an elevation of 215 feet (66 m) above mean sea level. It has one runway designated 17/35 with an asphalt surface measuring 3,200 by 45 metres (10,499 ft × 148 ft).

== Spaceport ==
As of July 2018, there is an announcement of operating the aerodrome as a commercial spaceport.

== Accidents and incidents ==
On Tuesday, October 11, 2022, a Boeing Dreamlifter aircraft (registration N718BA) on its way to Charleston, South Carolina, United States as Atlas Air flight 5Y-4231, lost one of its front wheels after take-off from the airport. The wheel crashed near a highway adjacent to the airport. The flight crew decided to continue their flight and landed safely some 11 hours later at their destination.

== See also ==
- List of airports in Italy
