= Mezzouna =

Coordinates: 34°35′N 9°50′E

- Commune and town
- Interactive map of Mezzouna
- Country: Tunisia
- Governorate: Sidi Bouzid Governorate

Government
  - Mayor: Fethi Ben Amor (Independent)

Population (2014)
  - Total: 7,390
- Time zone: UTC+1 (CET)
- Postal code: 9150

Mezzouna (Arabic: المزونة) is a town and commune in the Sidi Bou Zid Governorate, Tunisia. As of 2004, it had a population of 6,101.

Mezzouna is located at the eastern end of the mountainous mountain range Gafsa, at the foot of the Jebel Neguelet culminating at 411 meters.

Attached to the governorate of Sidi Bouzid, it constitutes a municipality with 7,390 inhabitants in 2014, it is also the capital of a delegation of 33,979 inhabitants.

It is in a crossroads position between the Sfax-Gafsa axis (RN14 road) and the axis that connects Sidi Bouzid, capital of the governorate, and Skhira on the Gulf of Gabes (forty kilometers to the southeast).

Located on the final stretch of the pipeline carrying oil from Algeria to the oil port of Skhira, it owned the largest plastics plant, the Mezzouna Plastic Complex.

The Bouhedma National Park is located about twenty kilometers southwest in the Jebel Bouhedma

== See also ==
- List of cities in Tunisia
