= Soliman Airfield =

Abandoned military airfield in Tunisia

Soliman Airfield
- Part of Twelfth Air Force

Site information
- Type: Military airfield
- Controlled by: United States Army Air Forces

Location
- Coordinates: 36°42′28.55″N 010°27′14.31″E

Site history
- Built: 1943
- In use: 1943

Location of Soliman Airfield, Tunisia

Soliman Airfield is an abandoned World War II military airfield in Tunisia, located approximately 12 km west-northwest of Manzil Bū Zalafah, and 39 km southeast of Tunis. It was a temporary airfield, not designed for heavy bomber or long-term use. During the North African Campaign, it was used by the United States Army Air Force Twelfth Air Force. Known units assigned were:

- 47th Bombardment Group, 1–21 July 1943, A-20 Havoc
- 321st Bombardment Group, 8 August–October 1943, B-25 Mitchell
- 325th Fighter Group, 4 November-11 December 1943, P-47 Thunderbolt

When the Americans moved out at the end of 1943, the airfield was abandoned. The remains of the field are visible in aerial photography, with much of the runways, taxiways and dispersal pads in evidence.

As of 2024, it is in use by Sonaprov as an agricultural strip.
