= Gaudo Airfield =

Gaudo Airfield
- Part of Twelfth Air Force

Site information
- Type: Military airfield
- Controlled by: United States Army Air Forces

Location
- Coordinates: 40°26′25″N 014°59′46″E

Site history
- Built: 1943
- In use: 1943-1944

Location of Gaudo Airfield, Sicily

Gaudo Airfield is an abandoned World War II military airfield in Southern Italy, approximately 3 km north of Paestum, where the Neolithic necropolis belonging to the Gaudo Culture was discovered, about 70 km southeast of Naples. It was a temporary airfield built by the United States Army Corps of Engineers. Its last known use was by the Italian Air Force in 1945.

- 12th Bombardment Group, 19 January-6 February 1944, B-25 Mitchell
- 321st Bombardment Group, February–April 1944, B-25 Mitchell
- 62d Troop Carrier Group, May–June 1944, C-47 Skytrain

A significant number of aircraft were damaged at the airfield in March 1944 when Mount Vesuvius erupted. The USAAF dismantled the PSP matting in June 1944 and turned the airfield over to the Italian Air Force for use in training. When photographer in January 1945 the field held 9 Baltimores, 9 P-39's as well as 3 Spitfire. Today the site of the airfield is indistinguishable from the many agricultural fields in the area.

== See also ==
- Gaudo Culture
