= Falconara Airbase =

Falconara Airbase Aeronautica Militare Falconara
- IATA: none; ICAO: none

Summary
- Airport type: Military
- Location: Falconara, Italy
- Coordinates: 43°36′58.83″N 013°21′44.35″E

Map

Runways
Direction	Length		Surface
Direction	ft	m	Surface
04/22	9,718	2,962

Falconara Airbase (IATA: AOI, ICAO: LIPY) is a joint-use civil airport and Italian Air Force (Aeronautica Militare) facility in Italy, located approximately 3 kilometres (1.9 mi) west of Falconara Marittima in the province of Ancona, about 200 km (120 mi) north-northeast of Rome.

As for passenger traffic, six airlines operate there, as well as international charter companies. Since 2000, the number of passengers has been around 400,000-600,000. In the decade 2014-2024, Ancona Airport fluctuated between the twenty-fifth and twenty-seventh Italian position for passenger traffic.

As for the cargo sector, DHL Aviation, FedEx Express and UPS Airlines fly regularly, and in the decade 2014-2024, Ancona Airport fluctuated between the ninth and eleventh Italian position for cargo traffic.

== World War II ==
During World War II, Falconara Airfield was a military airfield used by the United States Army Air Forces Twelfth Air Force for B-25 Mitchell combat operations by the 321st Bombardment Group between 1 April and 1 September 1945. After the war ended, the airfield was turned over to local authorities.
