= 560th Fighter-Day Squadron =

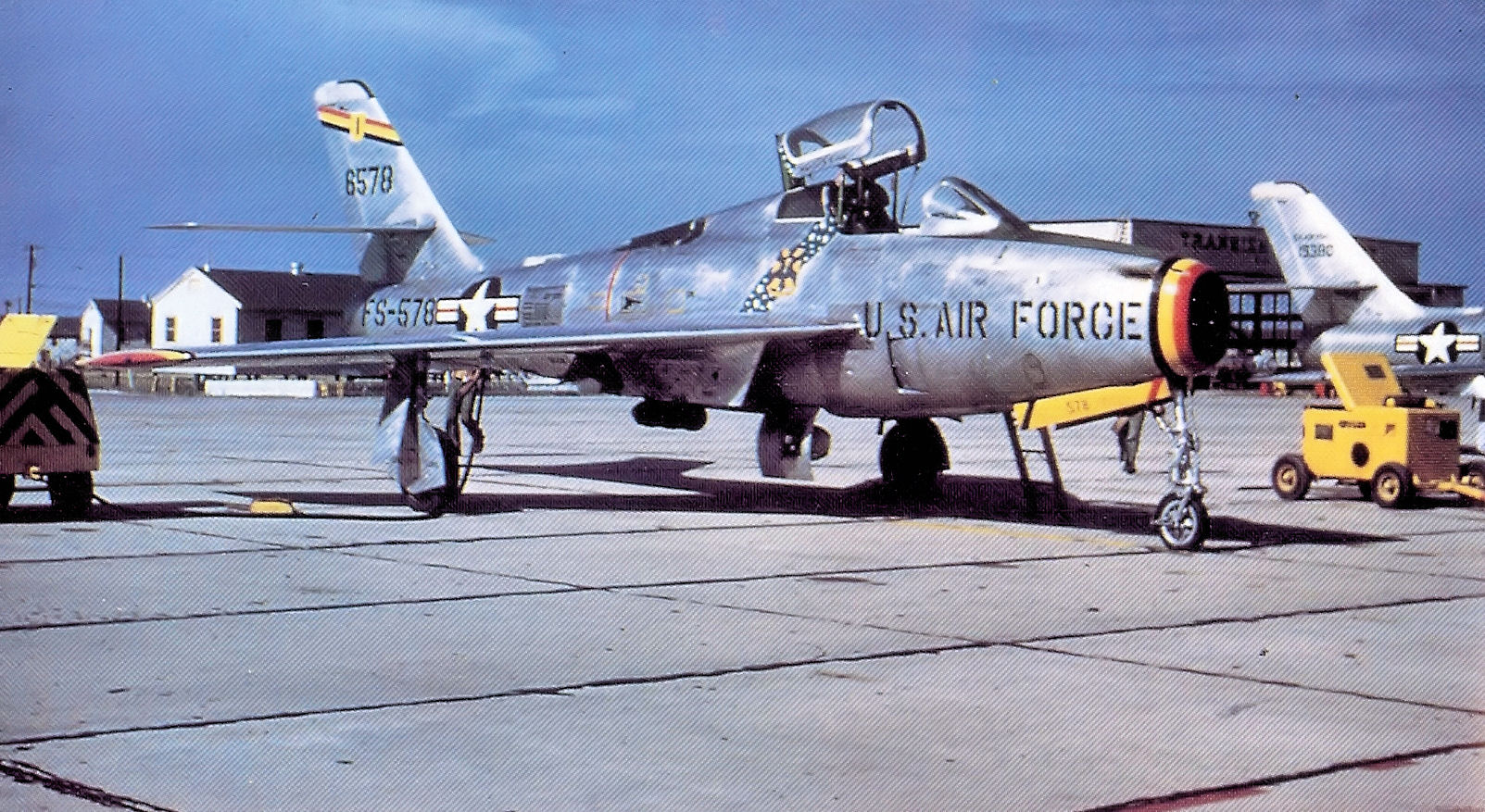
- 12th Wing F-84F Thunderstreak (Note: Aircraft is Republic F-84F-40-RE Thunderstreak, serial 52-6578. This plane crashed near Braum, TX on 18 July 1957. Baugher, Joe (7 October 2023). "1952 USAF Serial Numbers". Joe Baugher.)
- Active: 1941–1946; 1947–1948; 1951–1958
- Country: United States
- Branch: United States Air Force
- Role: Fighter
- Engagements: Mediterranean Theater of Operations; China Burma India Theater
- Decorations: Distinguished Unit Citation

Insignia
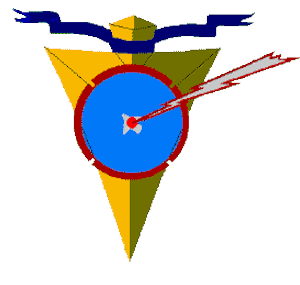
- 560th Strategic Fighter Squadron emblem (Note: Approved 22 May 1951. Description: On an arrowhead or, a gunsight azure, banded gules, thereon a lightning flash argent, aimed at the pipper of the sight gules, over a stylized aircraft argent, a ribbon azure encircling the base of the head of the arrow.)

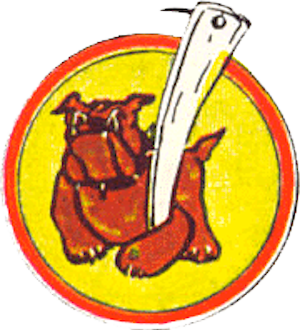
- 82d Bombardment Squadron emblem (Note: Approved 24 December 1941)

The 560th Fighter-Day Squadron is an inactive United States Air Force unit. It was last assigned to the 12th Fighter-Day Wing at Bergstrom Air Force Base, Texas, where it was inactivated on 8 January 1958.

The squadron was first organized in January 1941 as the 82d Bombardment Squadron. After training in the United States, it moved to the Mediterranean Theater of Operations, where it engaged in combat operations until 1944, earning a Distinguished Unit Citation. It then moved to the China Burma India Theater, continuing in combat until V-J Day. It returned to the United States and was inactivated at Fort Lawton, Washington on 22 January 1946. It was briefly activated in 1947, but budget considerations resulted in reductions of Air Force strength in Fiscal Year 1949, and the squadron did not equip or man.

In 1950, the squadron became the 560th Fighter-Escort Squadron, under this designation, and as the 560th Strategic Fighter Squadron, the squadron operated under Strategic Air Command (SAC) until July 1957, when SAC transferred its fighter units to Tactical Air Command. It deployed to England and Japan while under SAC control. Plans to upgrade its equipment were dropped, and the squadron inactivated in January 1958.

== History ==
=== World War II ===
==== Organization and initial operations ====
The squadron was first activated as the 82d Bombardment Squadron at McChord Field, Washington on 15 January 1941 as the United States began building up its armed forces after the beginning of World War II in Europe, drawing its initial cadre from the 17th Bombardment Group. It was assigned to the 12th Bombardment Group. Although the 12th was designated as a light bomber group, the squadron was initially equipped with a mix of trainers and Douglas B-18 Bolo medium bombers.

At the time of the Japanese Attack on Pearl Harbor, the squadron began flying antisubmarine patrols and watching for signs of an invasion. At the end of December 1941, the 12th Group was designated a medium bomber unit, consistent with its equipment. In February 1942, the group moved to Esler Field, Louisiana, where it began converting to the North American B-25 Mitchell. In early May, the 12th Group deployed to Stockton Army Air Field, California, where half its crews stood alert during daylight hours. After the defeat of the Japanese Navy in the Battle of Midway, the group returned to Esler Field.

In June 1942, while in the United States for a conference with President Franklin D. Roosevelt, British Prime Minister Winston Churchill made an urgent plea for military aid to help stop Erwin Rommel's Afrika Korps from overrunning Egypt, the Suez Canal and the Arabian oil fields. The United States dispatched the squadron to the Middle East to reinforce the British forces there. Between 14 July and 2 August, aircrews departed Morrison Field, Florida for Egypt via the South Atlantic ferry route to Egypt by way of Brazil, Ascension Island, across Africa to the Sudan, and then north to Egypt. By mid-August, all crews had arrived at RAF Deversoir, Egypt without a single loss. Ground personnel left Esler Field by train on 3 July for Fort Dix, and sailed from New York City on 16 July 1942 on the SS Pasteur for a month-long trip around South Africa and up the Red Sea to Suez, Egypt, arriving on 16 August 1942.

==== Western Desert Campaign ====
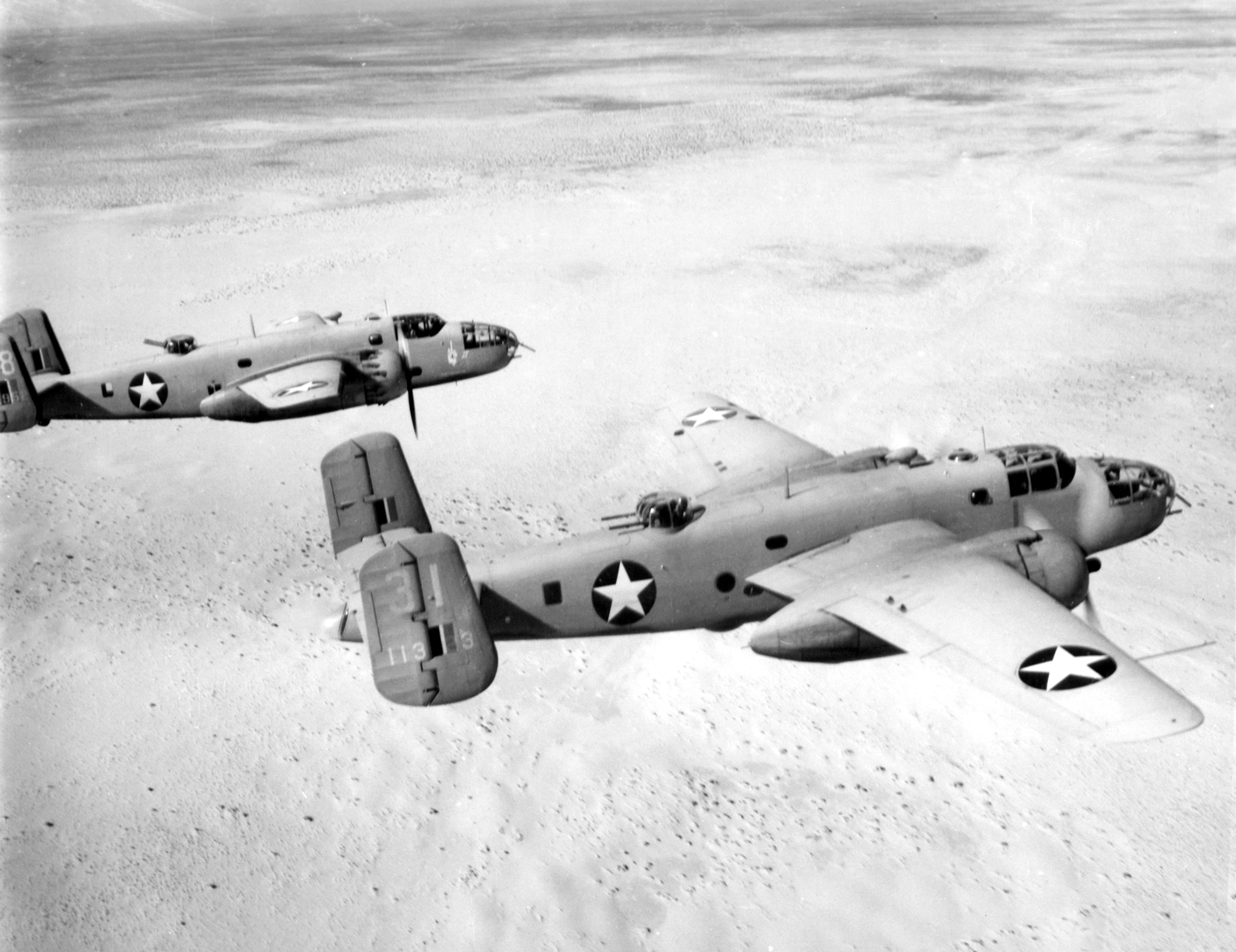
12th Group B-25s over the western desert

The squadron arrived in Egypt, and began training with Royal Air Force (RAF) and South African Air Force Douglas Boston units in desert warfare tactics and navigation. A month of training included five combat missions in combined formations with the Bostons. It flew its first mission on its own on 31 August against enemy airfields at RAF El Daba (LG 105) and Fuka (LG 17) and port facilities at Matruh, Egypt.

The unit's first missions were night attacks. However, the lack of flame dampeners on its Mitchells made them easy targets for flak defenses and night fighters. Losses caused the withdrawal of the unit from night operations until its planes could be modified with "finger exhausts". The unit's first missions were flown to support forces opposing Rommel's final effort to break through to the Suez Canal at the Battle of Alam Halfa between 31 August and 4 September 1942. Both Allied and enemy forces had learned that the open nature of the western desert made it easy to disperse armored forces, making pinpoint bombing ineffective. As a result, the 12th Group adopted the RAF tactic of pattern bombing. Group Mitchells would fly at medium altitude, flying spaced apart to saturate a target area with bombs spaced to damage any vehicles or other objectives in a defined target area.

The RAF had established numerous Landing Grounds (Note: These were identified by LG plus a number. These stretched across northern Egypt and Libya and were used by both sides as the front moved.) These landing grounds had no defined runways, and as many as eighteen bombers could take off at the same time, headed directly into the wind. In early October, intelligence reports reported that Regia Aeronautica and Luftwaffe airplanes at two of these landing grounds, near El Daba and Qattafa (LG 104), had been trapped by heavy rains. The squadron forces attacked the airfields on 9 October, destroying ten enemy aircraft and damaging an additional 22.

A few days later, the squadron began flying missions from LG 88, about 20 miles from the front lines. This move made them immediately available for strikes requested by the British Eighth Army. Operations from LG 88 began just before the Second Battle of El Alamein began on 23 October. Eighteen ship formations from the 12th Group took off or landed every half-hour during daylight on 24 October. By 4 November, Rommel began withdraw and the squadron's main targets became columns of tanks, trucks and troops retreating to the west. until rains bogged down the advance, permitting Rommel to withdraw to Tunisia. By 14 December, the squadron was operating from Magrun Landing Ground (LG 142), also called Gambut No. 2, a satellite of RAF Gambut (LG 139). The new base was within range of German bases on Crete.

American forces under General Dwight D. Eisenhower landed in Algeria and Morocco, and were met by German divisions under Rommel's command. The situation became desperate as they drove the Americans back through the Kasserine Pass. The squadron helped break up an attack along the Mareth Line. The squadron's actions during the north African campaign earned it a Distinguished Unit Citation for its operations from primitive landing grounds under difficult weather and terrain conditions and, despite repeated enemy attacks on its advanced positions and limited resources, made a major contribution to the defeat of enemy forces in the Middle East.

==== Italian Campaign ====
From Hergla Airfield, Tunisia, the squadron attacked targets on Pantellaria and Sicily. Little more than a month later, the squadron supported Operation Husky, the invasion of Sicily. The group's advance party boarded LSTs for Licata Sicily, where they set up their first base in Europe at Ponte Olivo Airfield, flying their first mission from Italy on 5 August. An attack on Randazzo on 13 August was the last significant action of the unit as part of Ninth Air Force, which moved to England, and the squadron transferred to Twelfth Air Force. Most aircrews had served enough time in theater that they were rotated back to the United States and replaced by new aircrews fresh from the States. Later in August, the group moved to Gerbini Airfield, from which it struck bridges, tunnels and other targets to support Operation Baytown, the invasion of southern Italy. In September, the group flew missions every day to support the foothold around Salerno established during Operation Avalanche.

The squadron began operating out of Foggia Airfield, Italy in November 1943. It attacked German targets in support of the American Fifth Army, and in eastern Italy supporting the British Eighth Army. It attacked aerodromes, docks, marshaling yards, bridges, and other targets in Italy and the Balkans.

Shortly after the squadron moved to Gaudo Airfield in January 1944, it was directed to prepare for movement out of the Mediterranean Theater. On 8 February, the group sailed on the HMT Dilwara and the MS Batory from Taranto. Although some in the group hoped the move was a withdrawal from combat, the ships sailed east, passing through the Suez Canal on the way to India.

==== Burma Campaign ====
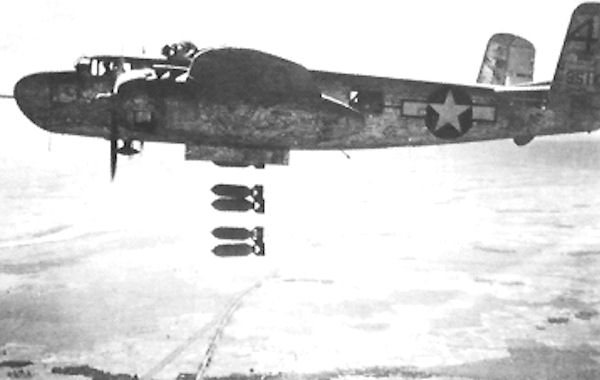
12th Group B-25H in bombing a target in Burma

The 12th Group moved to India to help the British Fourteenth Army repel a Japanese invasion from Burma toward Imphal, threatening the whole subcontinent and the Indian Ocean. The group's advance element arrived at Bombay on 12 March 1944, and the squadron arrived at Kurmitola Airfield on 21 March. The rear echelon of the unit did not arrive at the base in India until 24 April. In April, new B-25H and B-25J models began to arrive. The squadron equipped with a 50/50 mix of the two models. (Note: The H model had a 75mm cannon and .50 caliber machine guns in the nose and was flown by one pilot. The J had a glass nose with a navigator/bombardier position and had a pilot and copilot. Tucker & Bledsoe, p. 286.)

The squadron flew its first mission as part of Tenth Air Force, bombing Japanese supply dumps at Mogaung, Burma, on 16 April 1944. The lessened threat of flak in the new theater and added firepower of the updated Mitchells resulted in a change of tactics. Rather than the medium altitude pattern bombing the group specialized in the Mediterranean, the group now focused on low altitude bombing and strafing.

In April, Japanese forces that had broken out of the Burma mountains the previous month surrounded two Indian divisions at Imphal. The British still controlled the Imphal Airfield, however, and the 12th flew ammunition to the besieged troops, unloading the ammunition carried in the bomb bays of its Mitchells. The "ammo runs" continued for three weeks, until British forces repelled the Japanese invasion of India.

In June, the squadron moved to nearby Madhaiganj Airfield. This move added to the distance the group had to fly when attacking targets in Burma, sometimes requiring returning bombers to land at Comilla Airfield to refuel on their return flight. The logistics problems created by this move was lessened when the 434th began to operate from Comilla. This reduced the distance to most targets in Burma, but the group also flew missions to targets in northern Burma that tested the range of their B-25s. The first of these missions flown from Fenny Airfield was to Myitkyina to support Merrill's Marauders on 26 July.

The last major mission of the squadron was an overnight where the crews spent the night under the wings of their B-25s at Rameree, near Rangoon, and took off the next morning to bomb Ban-Takli airfield north of Bangkok, Thailand. The group began to equip with Douglas A-26 Invaders and were still training when the war ended. The squadron's aircrews flew the A-26s to Frankfurt, Germany, and the rest of the group waited at Fenny Airfield until they went to Karachi Airport in December to return to the United States.

On return to United States in January 1946, the squadron was inactivated at the port of embarkation the day after it arrived.

=== Post War activation ===
Reactivated under Tactical Air Command in May 1947 as a light bomber squadron, but neither manned or equipped. Inactivated in September 1948. Reactivated in November 1950 under Strategic Air Command as an F-84G Thunderjet Fighter squadron, stationed at Turner Air Force Base. Flew fighter-escort training missions with SAC B-50 and B-36 strategic bombers. The strategic fighter concept became redundant with the introduction of B-47 and B-52 jet bombers which could fly higher and faster than the first-generation F-86 escort fighters, and was reassigned to Tactical Air Command in 1957. TAC sent the Thunderjets to second-line Air National Guard and reserve squadrons, personnel reassigned to other units. Inactivated due to budget constraints in January 1958.

== Lineage ==
- Constituted as the 82d Bombardment Squadron (Light) on 20 November 1940

Activated on 15 January 1941
Redesignated 82d Bombardment Squadron (Medium) on 30 December 1941
Redesignated 82d Bombardment Squadron, Medium on 20 August 1944
Inactivated on 22 January 1946

- Redesignated 82d Bombardment Squadron, Light on 29 April 1947

Activated on 19 May 1947
Inactivated on 10 September 1948

- Redesignated 560th Fighter-Escort Squadron on 27 October 1950

Activated on 1 November 1950
Redesignated: 560th Strategic Fighter Squadron on 20 January 1953
Redesignated: 560th Fighter-Day Squadron on 1 July 1957
Inactivated on 8 January 1958

=== Assignments ===
- 12th Bombardment Group, 15 January 1941 – 22 January 1946
- 12th Bombardment Group, 19 May 1947 – 10 September 1948
- 12th Fighter-Escort Group, 1 Nov 1950 (attached to 12th Fighter-Day Wing after 10 February 1951)
- 12th Fighter-Escort Wing (later 12th Strategic Fighter, 12th Fighter-Day Wing), 18 Jun 1952-8 Jan 1958

=== Stations ===
- McChord Field, Washington, 15 January 1941
- Esler Field, Louisiana, 27 February – 3 July 1942 (operated from Stockton Army Air Field, California, 24 May – 24 June 1942
- RAF Deversoir, Egypt, 2 August 1942
- Landing Ground 88, Egypt, 15 October 1942
- RAF Gambut, Libya, 5 December 1942
- Magrun Landing Ground, Libya, 14 December 1942
- RAF Gambut, Libya, 16 December 1942
- Tmed El Chel Airfield, Libya, 10 January 1943
- Berteaux Airfield, Algeria, 4 February 1943
- Canrobert Airfield, Algeria, 15 March 1943
- Thibar Airfield, Tunisia, 1 May 1943
- Hergla Airfield, Tunisia, 2 June 1943
- Ponte Olivo Airfield, Sicily, Italy, c. 2 August 1943
- Gerbini Airfield, Sicily, Italy, 22 August 1943
- Foggia Airfield, Italy, 3 November 1943
- Gaudo Airfield, Italy, 19 January – 4 February 1944
- Tezgaon Airfield, India, March 1944
- Pandaveswar Airfield, India, 15 June 1944
- Fenny Airfield, India, 20 Ju1y 1944 (operated from Myitkyina Airfield, Burma, 10–28 Apr 1945
- Madhaiganj Airfield, India, 8 June 1945
- Karachi Airport, India (Pakistan), 18 November – 24 December 1945
- Fort Lawton, Washington, 21–22 January 1946
- Langley Field (later Langley Air Force Base), Virginia, 19 May 1947 – 10 September 1948
- Turner Air Force Base, Georgia, 1 November 1950
- Bergstrom Air Force Base, Texas, 5 December 1950– 8 January 1958

=== Aircraft ===
- PT-17 Stearman, 1941-1942
- Douglas B-18 Bolo, 1942-1942
- North American B-25 Mitchell, 1942-1945
- Douglas A-26 Invader, 1945
- Republic F-84 Thunderjet, 1951-1957
