= 559th Flying Training Squadron =

559th Flying Training Squadron

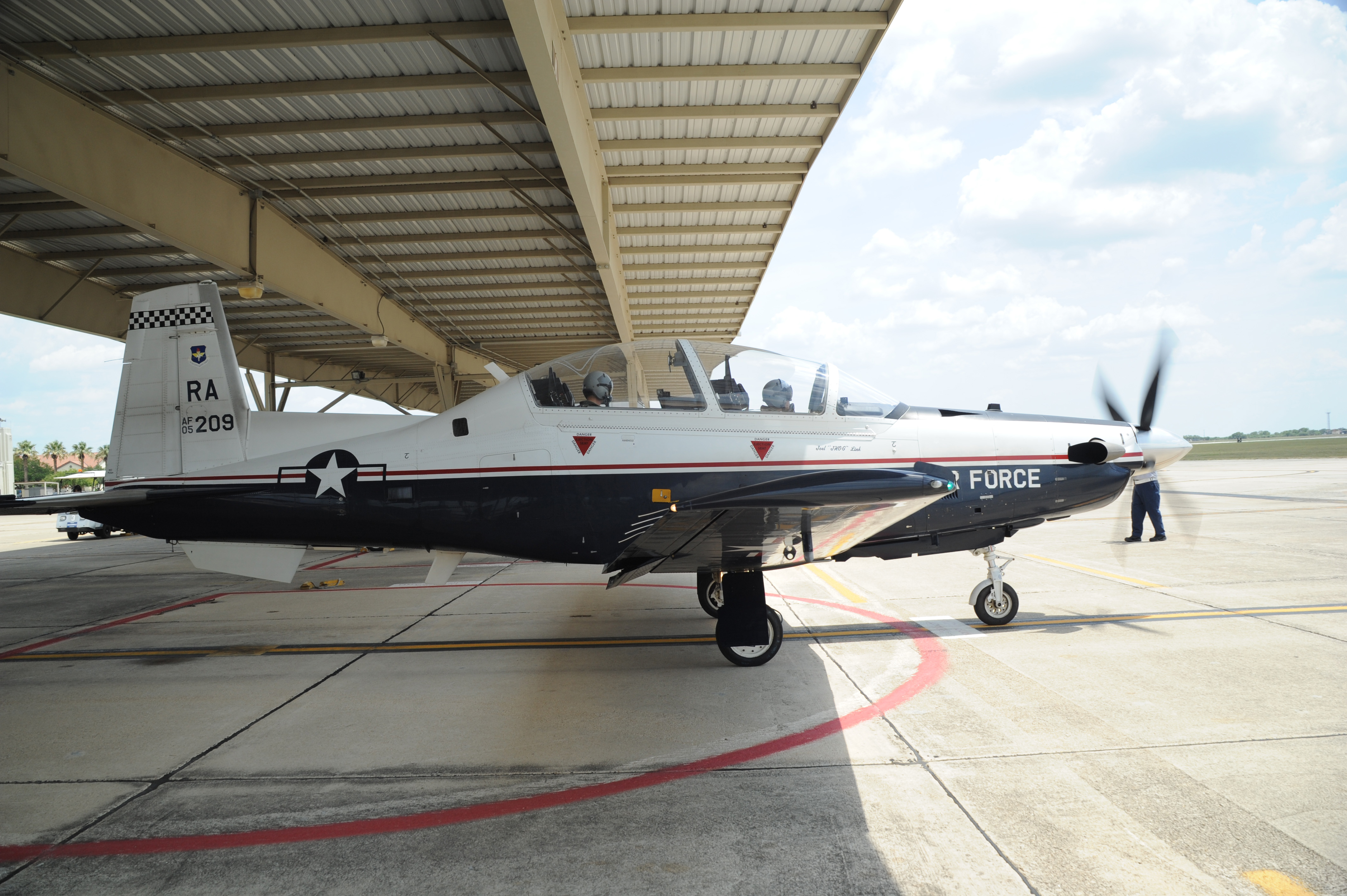
- Squadron T-6 Texan II at Randolph AFB
- Active: 1941–1946; 1947–1948; 1950–1958; 1962–1970; 1972–present
- Country: United States
- Branch: United States Air Force
- Role: Pilot training
- Part of: Air Education and Training Command
- Garrison/HQ: Joint Base San Antonio-Randolph
- Nickname: Fightin' Billygoats
- Motto: To The Goats...Fight!
- Engagements: North African Campaign; Operation Husky; Operation Avalanche; Italian campaign Burma campaign
- Decorations: Distinguished Unit Citation; Air Force Outstanding Unit Award with Combat "V" Device; Air Force Outstanding Unit Award; Republic of Vietnam Gallantry Cross with Palm

Commanders
- Current commander: Lt Col Benjamin “CRASS” Peacock

Insignia
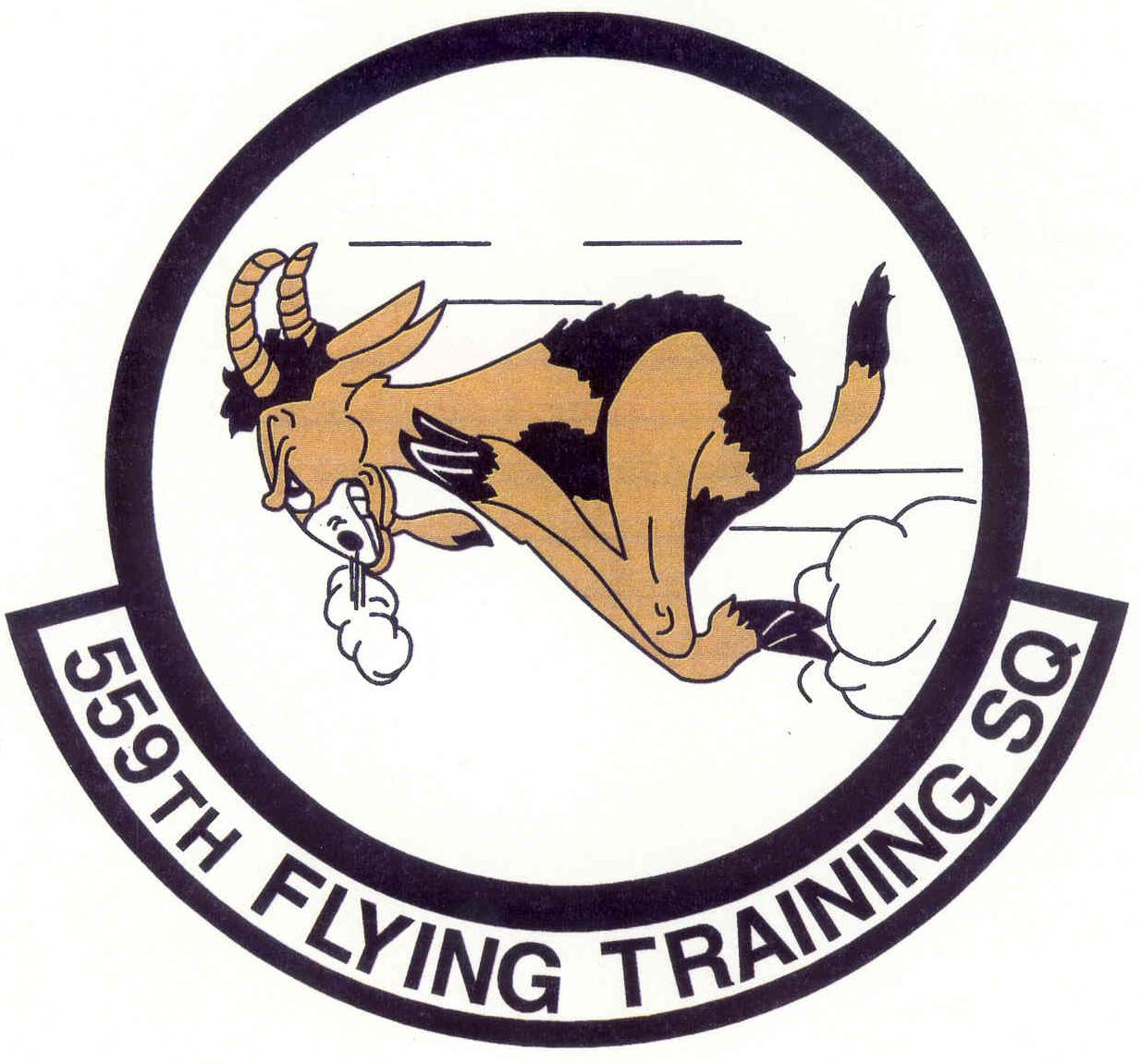
- 559th Flying Training Squadron emblem (Note: Approved 6 June 1942. Description: On a white disc a butting goat (light brown with black markings) within a black and white border.)

The 559th Flying Training Squadron is an active United States Air Force squadron at Joint Base San Antonio-Randolph, Texas. It operates the Beechcraft T-6 Texan II, and has trained instructor pilots at Randolph since 1972.

The squadron was first organized in January 1941 as the 81st Bombardment Squadron. After training in the United States, it moved to the Mediterranean Theater of Operations, where it engaged in combat operations until 1944, earning a Distinguished Unit Citation. It then moved to the China Burma India Theater, continuing in combat until V-J Day. It returned to the United States and was inactivated at Fort Lawton, Washington on 22 January 1946. It was briefly activated in 1947, but budget considerations resulted in reductions of Air Force strength in Fiscal Year 1949, and the squadron did not equip or man.

In 1950, the squadron became the 559th Fighter-Escort Squadron, under this designation, and as the 559th Strategic Fighter Squadron, the squadron operated under Strategic Air Command (SAC) until July 1957, when SAC transferred its fighter units to Tactical Air Command. It deployed to England and Japan while under SAC control. Plans to upgrade its equipment were dropped, and the squadron was inactivated in January 1958.

The squadron was activated again in 1962 as the 559th Tactical Fighter Squadron. Although intended to become one of the Air Force's first McDonnell F-4 Phantom II squadrons, it was temporarily equipped with Republic F-84F Thunderstreaks until Phantoms became available in 1964. The squadron deployed to Okinawa in the summer of 1965 to augment air defenses in the Pacific. Shortly afterwards, in December 1965, the squadron moved to Vietnam, where it engaged in combat until inactivating in March 1970, earning five Air Force Outstanding Unit Awards with Combat "V" Device.

== Mission ==
The squadron trains instructor pilots utilizing the Beechcraft T-6 Texan II aircraft, which is used to teach pilots basic flying skills. The pilots who graduate from the squadron's pilot instructor training program are assigned to train undergraduate pilots at several Air Force installations. Each year, the squadron trains 220 pilots to become instructors in a four-month-long program. These upgrading instructors, who are experienced pilots, learn how to teach the basics of flying to undergraduate pilots.

== History ==
=== World War II ===
==== Organization and initial operations ====
The squadron was first activated as the 81st Bombardment Squadron at McChord Field, Washington on 15 January 1941 as the United States began building up its armed forces after the beginning of World War II in Europe, drawing its initial cadre from the 17th Bombardment Group. It was assigned to the 12th Bombardment Group. Although the 12th was designated as a light bomber group, the squadron was initially equipped with a mix of Douglas B-18 Bolo and Douglas B-23 Dragon medium bombers.

At the time of the Japanese Attack on Pearl Harbor, the squadron began flying antisubmarine patrols and watching for signs of an invasion. At the end of December 1941, the 12th Group was designated a medium bomber unit, consistent with its equipment. In February 1942, the group moved to Esler Field, Louisiana, where it began converting to the North American B-25 Mitchell. In early May, the 12th Group deployed to Stockton Army Air Field, California, where half its crews stood alert during daylight hours. After the defeat of the Japanese Navy in the Battle of Midway, the group returned to Esler Field.

In June 1942, while in the United States for a conference with President Franklin D. Roosevelt, British Prime Minister Winston Churchill made an urgent plea for military aid to help stop Erwin Rommel's Afrika Korps from overrunning Egypt, the Suez Canal and the Arabian oil fields. The United States dispatched the squadron to the Middle East to reinforce the British forces there. Between 14 July and 2 August, aircrews departed Morrison Field, Florida, for Egypt via the South Atlantic ferry route to Egypt by way of Brazil, Ascension Island, across Africa to the Sudan, and then north to Egypt. By mid-August, all crews had arrived at Deversoir Air Base, Egypt without a single loss. Ground personnel left Esler Field by train on 3 July for Fort Dix, and sailed from New York City on 16 July 1942 on the SS Pasteur for a month-long trip around South Africa and up the Red Sea to Suez, Egypt, arriving on 16 August 1942.

==== Western Desert Campaign ====
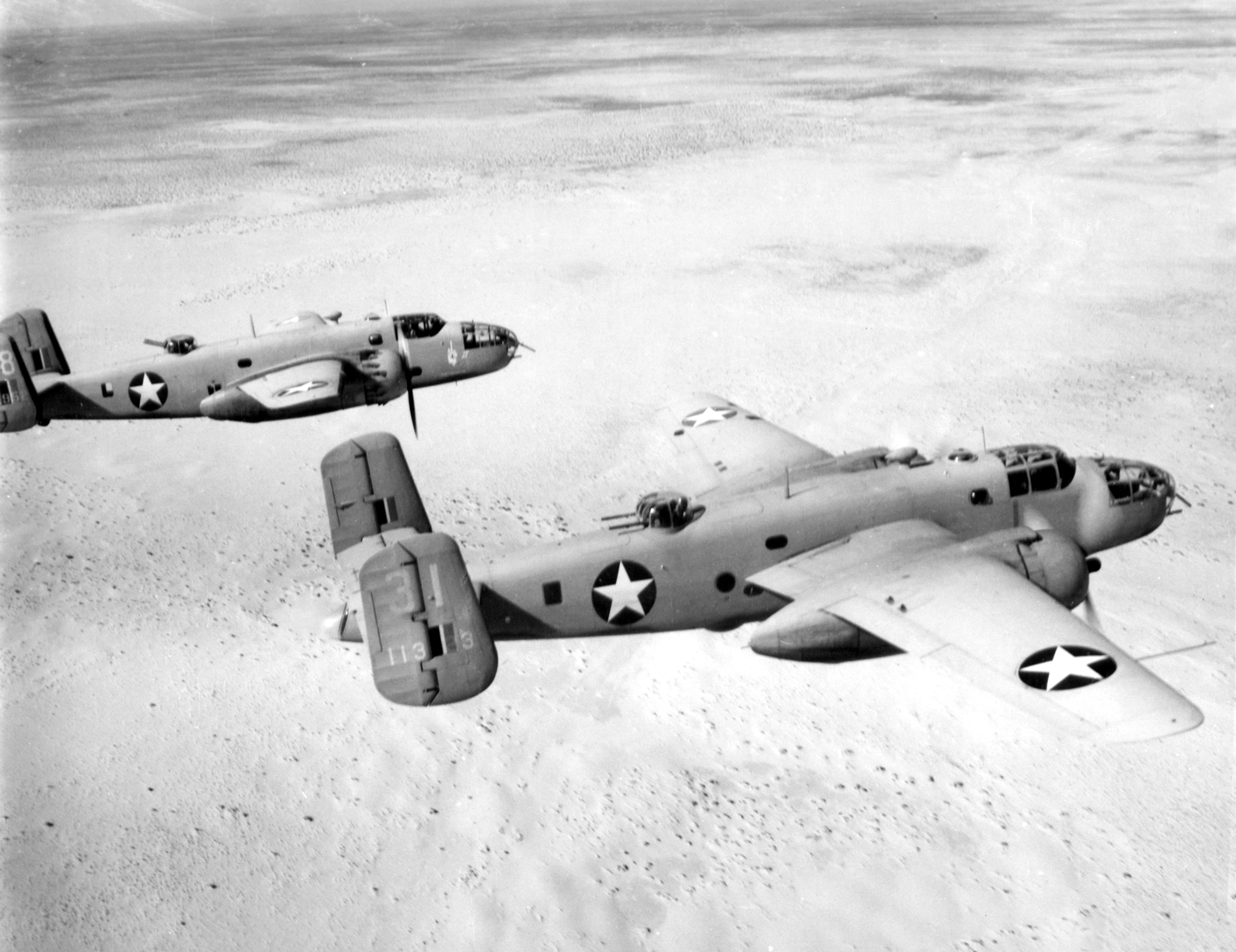
12th Group B-25s over the western desert

The squadron arrived at RAF Ismailia, Egypt, and began training with Royal Air Force (RAF) and South African Air Force Douglas Boston units in desert warfare tactics and navigation. A month of training included five combat missions in combined formations with the Bostons. It flew its first mission on its own on 31 August against enemy airfields at RAF El Daba (LG 105) and Fuka (LG 17) and port facilities at Matruh, Egypt.

The unit's first missions were night attacks. However, the lack of flame dampeners on its Mitchells made them easy targets for flak defenses and night fighters. Losses caused the withdrawal of the unit from night operations until its planes could be modified with "finger exhausts". The unit's first missions were flown to support forces opposing Rommel's final effort to break through to the Suez Canal at the Battle of Alam Halfa between 31 August and 4 September 1942. Both Allied and enemy forces had learned that the open nature of the western desert made it easy to disperse armored forces, making pinpoint bombing ineffective. As a result, the 12th Group adopted the RAF tactic of pattern bombing. Group Mitchells would fly at medium altitude, flying spaced apart to saturate a target area with bombs spaced to damage any vehicles or other objectives in a defined target area.

The RAF had established numerous Landing Grounds (Note: These were identified by LG plus a number. These stretched across northern Egypt and Libya and were used by both sides as the front moved.) These landing grounds had no defined runways, and as many as eighteen bombers could take off at the same time, headed directly into the wind. In early October, intelligence reports reported that Regia Aeronautica and Luftwaffe airplanes at two of these landing grounds, near Daba (LG 105) and Qattafa (LG 104), had been trapped by heavy rains. The squadron forces attacked the airfields on 9 October, destroying ten enemy aircraft and damaging an additional 22.

A few days later, the squadron began flying missions from LG 88, about 20 miles from the front lines. This move made them immediately available for strikes requested by the British Eighth Army. Operations from LG 88 began just before the Second Battle of El Alamein began on 23 October. Eighteen ship formations from the 12th Group took off or landed every half-hour during daylight on 24 October. By 4 November, Rommel began to withdraw, and the squadron's main targets became columns of tanks, trucks, and troops retreating to the west. until rains bogged down the advance, permitting Rommel to withdraw to Tunisia. By 14 December, the squadron was operating from Magrun Landing Ground (LG 142), also called Gambut No. 2, a satellite of RAF Gambut (LG 139). The new base was within range of German bases on Crete.

American forces under General Dwight D. Eisenhower landed in Algeria and Morocco, and were met by German divisions under Rommel's command. The situation became desperate as they drove the Americans back through the Kasserine Pass. The squadron helped break up an attack along the Mareth Line. The squadron's actions during the North African campaign earned it a Distinguished Unit Citation for its operations from primitive landing grounds under difficult weather and terrain conditions and, despite repeated enemy attacks on its advanced positions and limited resources, made a major contribution to the defeat of enemy forces in the Middle East.

==== Italian Campaign ====
From Hergla Airfield, Tunisia, the squadron attacked targets on Pantellaria and Sicily. A little more than a month later, the squadron supported Operation Husky, the invasion of Sicily. The group's advance party boarded LSTs for Licata Sicily, where they set up their first base in Europe at Ponte Olivo Airfield, flying their first mission from Italy on 5 August. An attack on Randazzo on 13 August was the last significant action of the unit as part of the Ninth Air Force, which moved to England, and the squadron transferred to the Twelfth Air Force. Most aircrews had served enough time in theater that they were rotated back to the United States and replaced by new aircrews fresh from the States. Later in August, the group moved to Gerbini Airfield, from which it struck bridges, tunnels, and other targets to support Operation Baytown, the invasion of southern Italy. In September, the group flew missions every day to support the foothold around Salerno established during Operation Avalanche.

The squadron began operating out of Foggia Airfield, Italy, in November 1943. It attacked German targets in support of the American Fifth Army, and in eastern Italy supporting the British Eighth Army. It attacked aerodromes, docks, marshaling yards, bridges, and other targets in Italy and the Balkans. Prior to the end of January 1944, it participated in raids on harbor and dock facilities along the Yugoslavian Adriatic Coast, at Zadar, Split, and Šibenik. In addition, the squadron flew missions against the Mostar Main Airdrome and Eleusis Airdrome in Greece. The 81st Bombardment Squadron's final Italian Campaign mission took place on 30 January 1944 in an intended attack upon a road junction near Rome. A cloud covering completely obscured the target as the bombers approached; however, so they aborted the mission.

Shortly after the squadron moved to Gaudo Airfield in January 1944, it was directed to prepare for movement out of the Mediterranean Theater. On 8 February, the group sailed on the HMT Dilwara and the MS Batory from Taranto. Although some in the group hoped the move was a withdrawal from combat, the ships sailed east, passing through the Suez Canal on the way to India.

==== Burma Campaign ====
From Bombay it moved by train and a Ganges River boat to Tezgaon Airfield near Calcutta. Equipped with new bombers, it initiated a training program in low-level attack and bombing methods which were being used extensively in that area at the time.

The 81st entered combat on 16 April 1944 when it dispatched 12 B-25s in an attack upon railway sidings and a Japanese supply dump at Mogaung, Burma. One bomber was lost in the raid. Eight days later the 81st attacked Japanese stores and troop concentrations in the Kazu area. In May the it made numerous attacks upon the Tiddim Road in Burma, as well as on railway lines running north and east of Mandalay. Probably the unit's most significant mission during the month was its participation in the bombing of Ningthoukhong, Burma, a key position to the Japanese defensive line. The town was reported to have housed Japanese artillery pieces, antitank guns, tanks, and as many as 1,000 troops.

During the ensuing 12 months, the 81st helped to gain air superiority over the Japanese in Burma and provided support for Allied ground forces in driving them completely out of that country. The squadron's efforts were expended principally in bombing attacks on airdromes and airfields, headquarters buildings, roads, highway bridges, gun emplacements, railway bridges, rail junctions, marshalling yards, storage areas, and troop concentrations. Notable was the series of missions which contributed to the capture of Myitkyina by General Joseph W. Stilwell's ground forces early in August. The unit also participated in tactical operations during February and March 1945, helping to capture Miektila and Mandalay in May.

In September 1944 the unit extended its range of operations to include targets in China. At that time the Japanese were attempting to throw the Chinese back across the Salween River. The 81st provided effective support to the Chinese troops engaged in repelling the Japanese offensive. For its part, the squadron participated in a series of eight bombing missions targeting Japanese stores and troop concentrations, principally in the Chinese cities of Bhamo, Mangshih, and Wanling.

With the capture of Burma in the spring of 1945, combat operations for the 81st Bombardment Squadron were greatly reduced. At its base in India the unit began transition training in Douglas A-26 Invader aircraft. Training ceased with the surrender of Japan in August 1945. The air echelon of the squadron left India on 27 September on the first leg of its journey back to the Zone of the Interior. Departure of the ground echelon was delayed, however, was delayed for three months, sailing on Christmas Eve 1945 it Karachi, India, aboard the Hawaiian Shipper, for Seattle, Washington. There was a brief stop in Singapore, after which the voyage was continued out through the South China Sea and into the Pacific. On 21 January, the squadron was reduced in strength to one officer and two enlisted men and then inactivated at Fort Lawton, Washington.

=== Post War activation ===
Fifteen months later, on 19 May 1947, it was activated at Langley Field, Virginia as a light bombardment squadron. Without ever having been manned, however, the squadron was inactivated on 10 September 1948.

=== Strategic fighter operations ===
The squadron was redesignated the 559th Fighter-Escort Squadron, and assigned to Strategic Air Command on 27 October 1950. On 1 November, it was activated at Turner Air Force Base, Georgia assigned to the 12th Fighter-Escort Group. Early in December 1950 it transferred to Bergstrom Air Force Base, Texas. The primary mission of the 559th was to organize and train a force capable of providing immediate fighter escort and airbase protection in any part of the world. In January 1951 the squadron began flying training in the Republic F-84 Thunderjet. The program principally of routine transition training, night flying, instrument flights, and ground controlled approaches. Bombing and gunnery practice was accomplished at the Matagorda Island Bombing and Gunnery Range on Matagorda Island, just off the Texas coast. Late in April the squadron participated in a practice mission to Turner Air Force Base. Early in June, the 559th participated in a long-range escort mission conducted by the 12th Fighter-Escort Wing. All told, 75 F-84s were involved. After staging at Wright Patterson Air Force Base, Ohio, they were divided into two sections. One section escorted a large number of Convair B-36 Peacemakers in a simulated bombing mission over New York City. The other section escorted another group of B-36s in a similar mission over Detroit. All the Thunderjets staged at Selfridge Air Force Base, Michigan, before returning to Bergstrom.

In mid-July 1951 the 559th went on temporary duty to RAF Manston, England. The move was made by the Military Air Transport Service and by civilian aircraft. Having left its own fighter aircraft at Bergstrom, the wing used F-84s of the 31st Fighter-Escort Wing which it replaced at Manston. Operations overseas began during the latter part of July with orientation flights to various United States Air Force bases in England. During August all units of the 12th Wing took part in a 7th Air Division operation which was designed to measure the defense of Norway. While in England, the 559th Fighter-Escort Squadron and its two companion units, the 560th and 561st Squadrons, went to Wheelus Field, Libya, for two weeks of gunnery practice. Late in November 1951 the wing began moving back to the United States. The advanced and rear echelons were airlifted from Manston to Austin by Military Air Transport Service (MATS) aircraft. The second increment sailed aboard the USS General W. G. Haan to Newark, New Jersey, and made its way to the wing's home base via MATS aircraft. Back at Bergstrom the squadron was equipped with new F-84s.

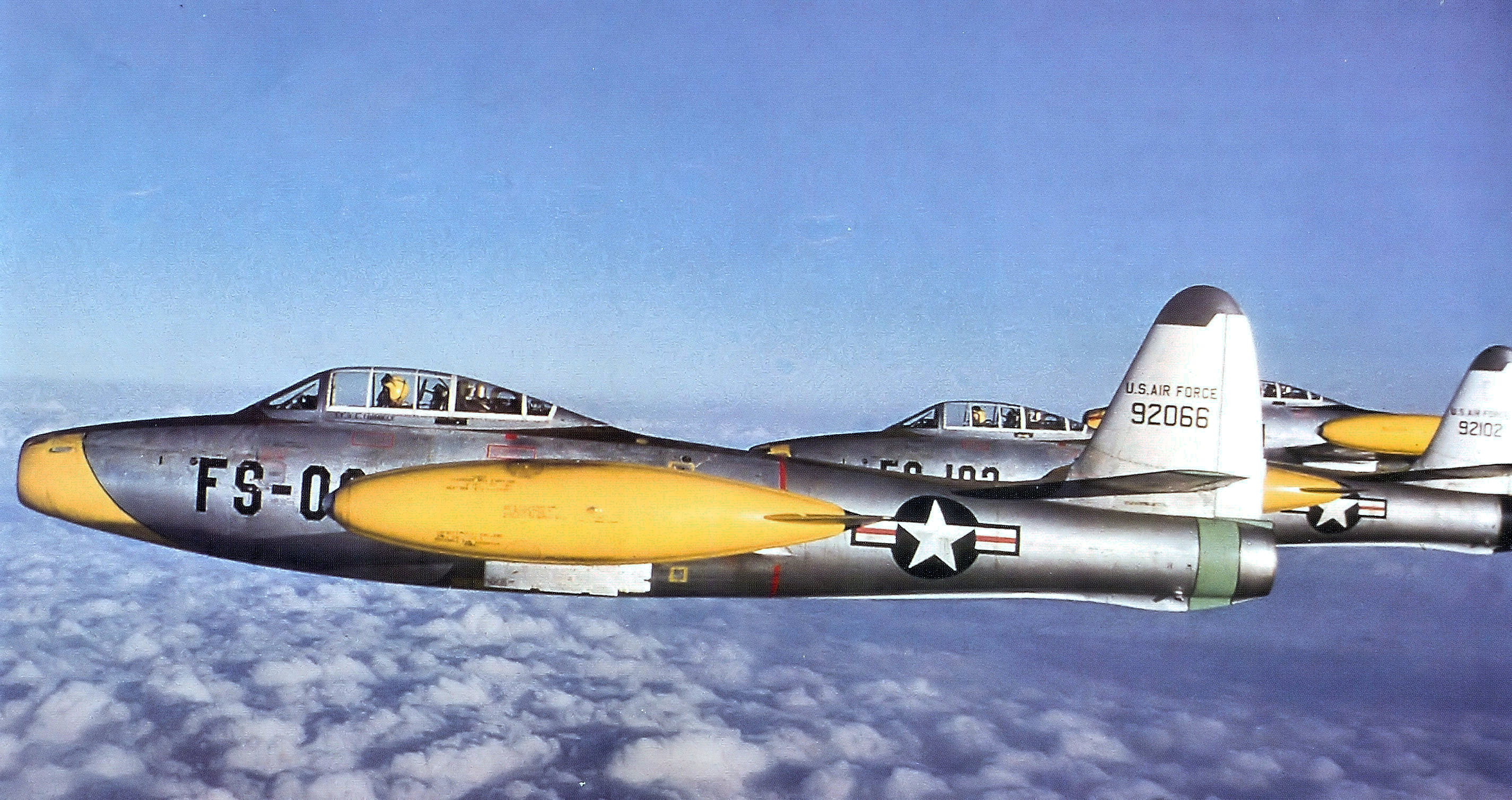
12th Wing F-84E at RAF Manston (Note: Aircraft is Republic F-84E-1-RE Thunderjet, serial 49-2066. This plane transferred to the Ohio Air National Guard in 1954 and was scrapped on 24 October 1957. Baugher, Joe (7 September 2023). "1949 USAF Serial Numbers". Joe Baugher.)

In January 1953 the 559th was redesignated as a strategic fighter squadron. In May it deployed to Chitose Air Base, Japan for approximately 90 days. The principal purpose of the deployment was to provide training for the wing and enable it, while operating as a part of the Northern Area Air Defense Command, to augment the Japanese Air Defense Force. On 15 May it replaced the 508th Strategic Fighter Wing on rotation in Japan. On 12 June the commanding officer of the 559th Squadron, Lieutenant Colonel Paul M. Hall, was killed in an airplane crash while making a ground-controlled approach. The squadron redeployed to Bergstrom Air Force Base in August.

Over a period of several months after returning to its home base in August 1953, the 559th Strategic Fighter Squadron made special efforts to qualify all of its aircrews as combat ready. At the same time it was interested in requalifying combat ready crews in various phases of bombing and gunnery techniques. For these purposes extensive use was made of the bombing and gunnery range facilities on Matagorda Island. In May 1954, however, the 559th again deployed to Japan on temporary duty to Misawa Air Base. One of the most important operations during this second tour of duty in the Far East was a series of exercises in which the capabilities of the Northern Air Defense Area were tested. The wing returned to the United States again in August 1954.

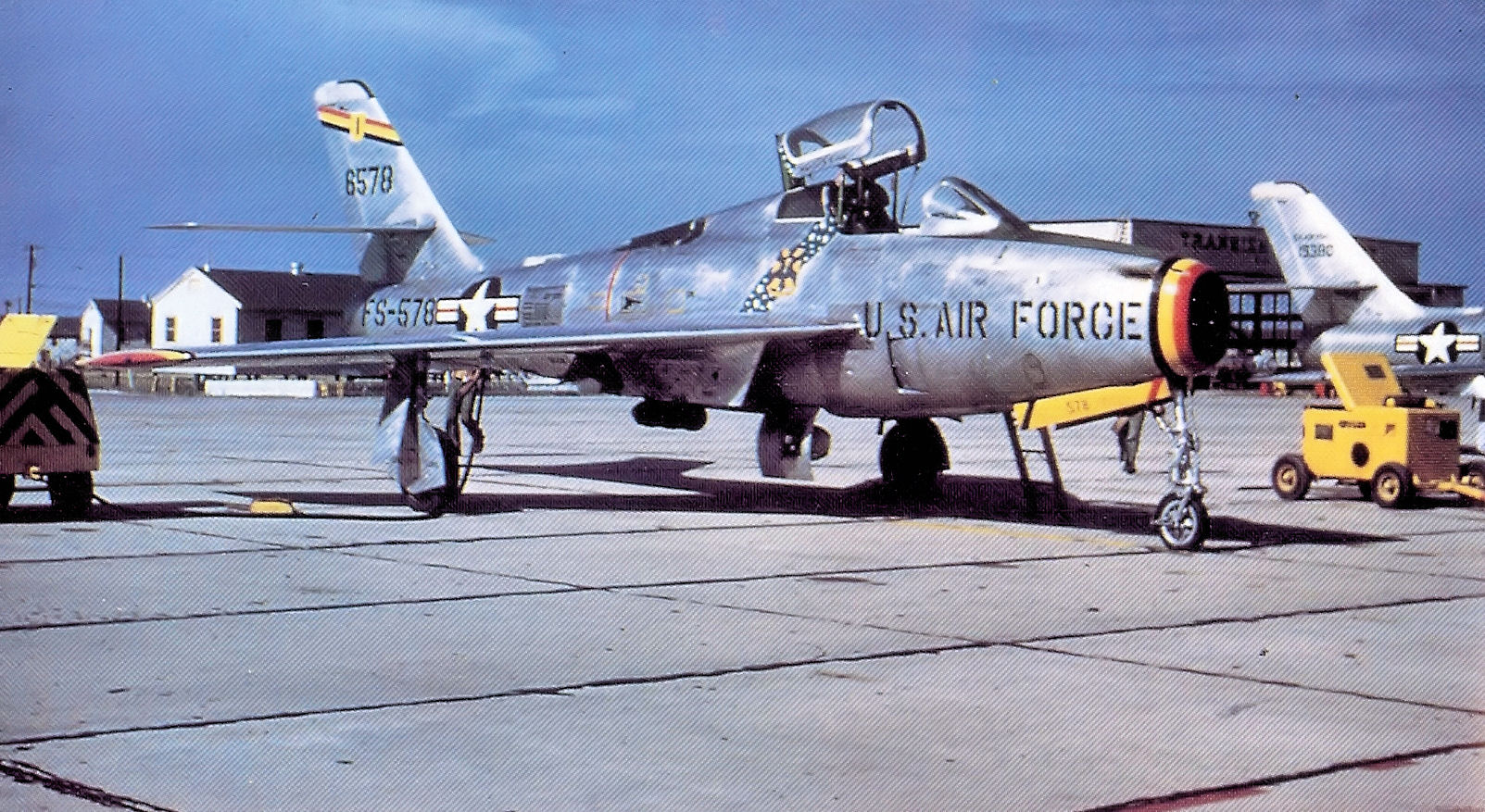
12th Wing Republic F-84F Thunderstreak (Note: Aircraft is Republic F-84F-40-RE Thunderstreak, serial 52-6578. This plane crashed near Braum, TX on 18 July 1957. Baugher, Joe (7 October 2023). "1952 USAF Serial Numbers". Joe Baugher.)

While stationed at Bergstrom Air Force Base during the next several years, the 559th continued to accomplish the usual training programs and routine training missions. There were, however, a number of special missions and other activities. In June 1955 the unit participated in weapons loading exercise and unit simulated combat mission at Gray Air Force Base, Texas. Operating from the forward staging base (Gray AFB), F-84s of the 559th were scheduled to destroy a number of targets simulated on Matagorda Island. On this mission the Thunderjets accomplished air refueling over Roswell, New Mexico. Meanwhile, in May 1955 the 12th Strategic Fighter Wing was selected to represent the Strategic Air Command in the annual fighter competition to be held in connection with the USAF Gunnery Meet in September 1955 at Nellis Air Force Base, Nevada. A group of candidates began training on Matagorda Island in June. Selected for the competition were two officers from the 12th Wing headquarters, and one each from the 559th, 560th, and 561st Squadrons. Competing at Nellis in September against this special team from the Strategic Air Command were other teams from the Air Defense Command, Far East Air Forces, Tactical Air Command, and United States Air Forces in Europe. At the meet the Strategic Air Command took third place, running behind those of the Far East Air Forces and the United States Air Forces in Europe. Additionally, during the early part of May 1956 the 559th began participation with the 560th in the deployment of 25 F-84s for approximately 90 days at Eielson Air Force Base, Alaska. The purpose of the operation was to furnish a competent fighter offensive within the Alaskan Air Command. In addition to carrying out routine aircrew training, while at Eielson the detachment took part in several Fifteenth Air Force emergency war plan missions. At the conclusion of the temporary duty in Alaska the detachment flew nonstop back to its home base. The 27th Air refueling Squadron provided in-flight refueling for the redeployment.

=== Tactical fighter operations ===
Plans announced at Bergstrom as early as April 1956 indicated that in due course of time the 559th would convert to the long-range McDonnell F-101 Voodoo. A tentative schedule for equipping with the F-101 was set for May through October 1957. Training in the new aircraft for aircrews and maintenance personnel of the wing began at Bergstrom in November 1956. This training was discontinued after about a month, however, following a decision by higher headquarters not to equip the wing with the F-101 aircraft.

Effective 1 July 1957, the 559th was redesignated a fighter-day squadron and assigned to the Tactical Air Command. The wing and its squadrons were inactivated, however, on 8 January 1958.

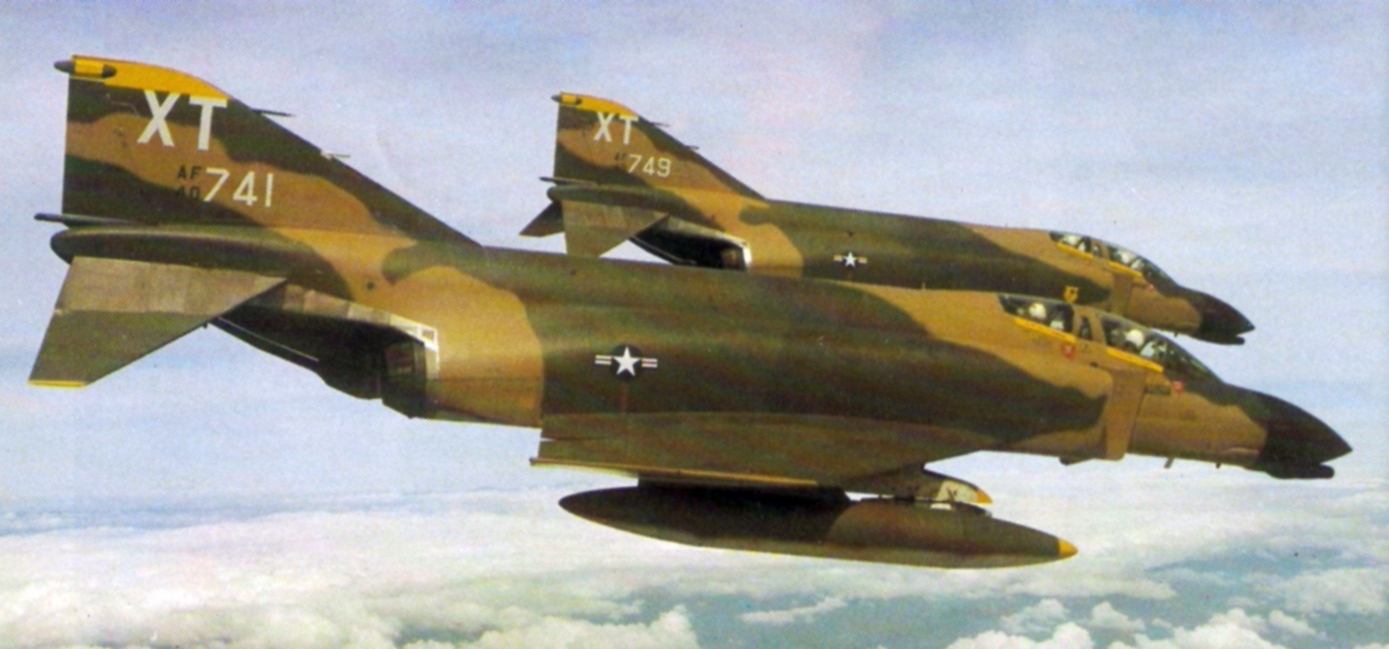
12th Tactical Fighter Wing F-4C Phantom IIs in flight over Vietnam, December 1968

On 17 April 1962, the 559th Fighter-Day Squadron was redesignated the 559th Tactical Fighter Squadron. At the same time, it was activated and assigned to the Tactical Air Command. Effective 25 April 1962, the squadron was organized at MacDill Air Force Base, Florida, with further assignment to the 12th Tactical Fighter Wing.

==== Combat in Vietnam ====
The squadron augmented air defenses of Okinawa from June to September 1965 and participated in combat operations over Southeast Asia from 2 January 1966 to 23 March 1970.

=== Flying training ===
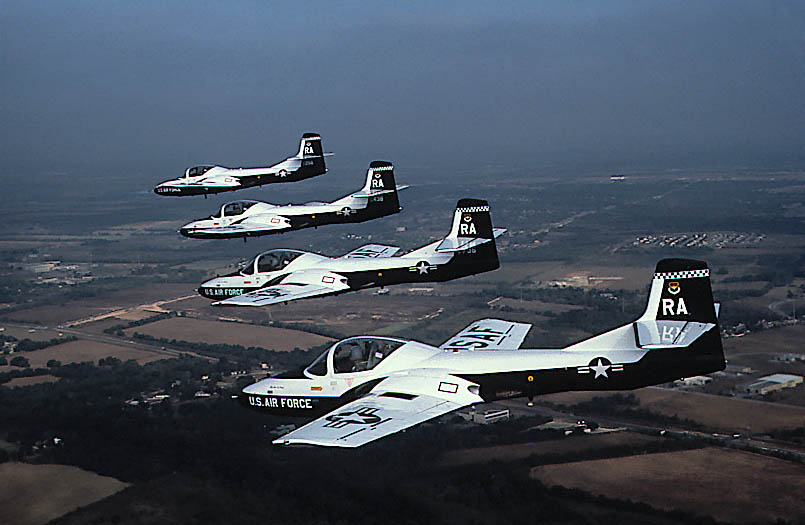
T-37s from Randolh AFB in formation

The unit was redesignated the 559th Flying Training Squadron and activated in May 1972 at Randolph Air Force Base, Texas. It initially operated the Cessna T-37 Tweet jet trainer, training instructor pilots. As the T-37 was removed from service as a trainer, the squadron graduated its last class of instructors in the plane in March 2003. However, the squadron had already begun receiving Beechcraft T-6 Texan IIs in 2000. to replace the T-37s. It has since trained US and friendly nation instructor aircrews from May 1972 to the present time.

== Lineage ==
- Constituted as the 81st Bombardment Squadron (Light) on 20 November 1940

Activated on 15 January 1941
Redesignated 81st Bombardment Squadron (Medium) on 30 December 1941
Redesignated 81st Bombardment Squadron, Medium on 9 October 1944
Inactivated on 22 January 1946

- Redesignated 81st Bombardment Squadron, Light on 29 April 1947

Activated on 19 May 1947
Inactivated on 10 September 1948

- Redesignated 559th Fighter-Escort Squadron on 27 October 1950

Activated on 1 November 1950
Redesignated 559th Strategic Fighter Squadron on 20 January 1953
Redesignated 559th Fighter-Day Squadron on 1 July 1957
Inactivated on 8 January 1958

- Redesignated 559th Tactical Fighter Squadron and activated on 17 April 1962 (not organized)

Organized on 25 April 1962
Inactivated on Inactivated on 31 March 1970

- Redesignated 559th Flying Training Squadron on 22 March 1972

Activated on 1 May 1972

=== Assignments ===
- 12th Bombardment Group, 15 January 1941 – 22 January 1946
- 12th Bombardment Group, 19 May 1947 – 10 September 1948
- 12th Fighter-Escort Group, 1 November 1950 (attached to 12th Fighter-Escort Wing after 10 February 1951)
- 12th Fighter-Escort Wing (later 12th Strategic Fighter Wing, 12th Fighter-Day Wing), 16 June 1952 – 8 January 1958
- Tactical Air Command, 17 April 1962 (not organized)
- 12th Tactical Fighter Wing, 25 April 1962 (attached to 51st Fighter-Interceptor Wing 12 June-c. 7 September 1965)
- 836th Air Division, 8 November 1965
- 12th Tactical Fighter Wing, 27 December 1965 – 31 March 1970
- 12th Flying Training Wing, 1 May 1972
- 12th Operations Group, 15 December 1991 – present

=== Stations ===
- McChord Field, Washington, 15 January 1941
- Esler Field, Louisiana, 27 February – 3 July 1942 (operated from Stockton Army Air Field, California 24 May – 24 June 1942)
- Deversoir Air Base, Egypt, Egypt, 30 Jul 1942
- Landing Ground LG 88, Egypt, 18 October 1942
- Gambut Main (LG 139), Libya, 6 December 1942
- El Magrun Landing Ground (LG 142), Libya, 14 December 1942
- Gambut Main (LG 139), Libya, 17 December 1942
- Tmed El Chel Airfield, Libya, 11 January 1943
- Berteaux Airfield, Algeria, 3 February 1943
- Canrobert Airfield, Algeria, 15 March 1943
- Thibar, Tunisia, 1 May 1943
- Hergla Airfield, Tunisia, 2 June 1943
- Ponte Olivo Airfield, Sicily, Italy, c. 2 August 1943
- Gerbini Airfield, Sicily, Italy, 22 August 1943
- Foggia Main Airfield, Italy, 5 November 1943
- Gaudo Airfield, Italy, 18 January – 6 February 1944
- Tezgaon Airfield, India (Bangla Desh), 20 March 1944
- Madhaiganj Airfield, India, 13 June 1944
- Fenny Airfield, India, 17 July 1944 (operated from Meiktila, Burma 21–29 April 1945)
- Madhaiganj Airfield, India (Bangla Desh), 7 June 1945
- Karachi, India (Pakistan), 15 November – 24 December 1945
- Fort Lawton, Washington, 21–22 January 1946
- Langley Field (later Langley Air Force Base), Virginia, 19 May 1947 – 10 September 1948
- Turner Air Force Base, Georgia, 1 November 1950
- Bergstrom Air Force Base, Texas, 5 December 1950 – 8 January 1958 (deployed to RAF Manston, England 18 July-30 November 1951, Chitose Air Base, Japan 15 May – 10 August 1953, Misawa Air Base, Japan 12 May – 11 August 1954)
- MacDill Air Force Base, Florida, 25 April 1962 (deployed to Naha Air Base, Okinawa 12 June – 7 September 1965)
- Cam Ranh Bay Air Base, South Vietnam, 27 December 1965 – 31 March 1970
- Randolph Air Force Base, Texas, 1 May 1972 – present

=== Aircraft ===
- Douglas B-18 Bolo (1941–1942)
- North American B-25 Mitchell (1942–1945)
- Douglas A-26 Invader (1945)
- Republic F-84 Thunderjet (1950–1957, 1962–1964)
- McDonnell F-4 Phantom II (1964–1970)
- Cessna T-37 Tweet (1972–unknown)
- Beechcraft T-6 Texan II (2000–present)
