= 434th Bombardment Squadron =

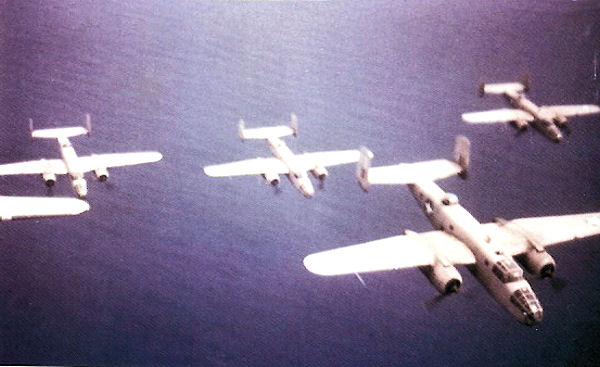
- Squadron B-25C Mitchells on approach from the Mediterranean to enemy targets in Libya during late August 1942
- Active: 1940-1946
- Country: United States
- Branch: United States Air Force
- Role: Medium bomber
- Engagements: Mediterranean Theater of Operations; China Burma India Theater
- Decorations: Distinguished Unit Citation

Insignia
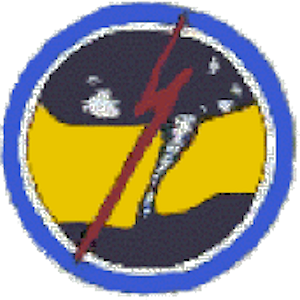
- 434th Bombardment Squadron emblem (Note: Approved 18 February 1942. Description: On a yellow disc with blue and white border a black tornado issuing from the ground, in brown, overall a red lightning flash bendsinisterwise fimbriated yellow.)

The 434th Bombardment Squadron is an inactive United States Air Force unit. It was organized in January 1941 as the 19th Reconnaissance Squadron, and became the 434th in 1942. After training in the United States, it moved to the Mediterranean Theater of Operations, where it engaged in combat operations until 1944, earning a Distinguished Unit Citation. It then moved to the China Burma India Theater, continuing in combat until V-J Day. It departed for the United States and was inactivated at Fort Lawton, Washington on 22 January 1946.

== History ==
=== Organization and initial operations ===
The squadron was first activated as the 19th Reconnaissance Squadron at McChord Field, Washington on 15 January 1941 as the United States began building up its armed forces after the beginning of World War II in Europe, drawing its initial cadre from the 17th Bombardment Group. It was attached to the 12th Bombardment Group. Although the 12th was designated as a light bomber group, the squadron was initially equipped with a mix of Douglas B-18 Bolo and Douglas B-23 Dragon medium bombers. In August 1941, the Air Corps converted its reconnaissance squadrons attached to light bomber groups and the 19th became the 94th Bombardment Squadron and was assigned to the group.

At the time of the Japanese Attack on Pearl Harbor, the squadron began flying antisubmarine patrols and watching for signs of an invasion. At the end of December 1941, the 12th Group was designated a medium bomber unit, consistent with its equipment. This resulted in the 94th again becoming a reconnaissance unit, as the 94th Reconnaissance Squadron. In February 1942, the group moved to Esler Field, Louisiana, where it began converting to the North American B-25 Mitchell. With the Mitchells, the 94th resumed the bombardment mission, this time as the 434th Bombardment Squadron in April. In early May, the 12th Group deployed to Stockton Army Air Field, California, where half its crews stood alert during daylight hours. After the defeat of the Japanese Navy in the Battle of Midway, the group returned to Esler Field.

In June 1942, while in the United States for a conference with President Franklin D. Roosevelt, British Prime Minister Winston Churchill made an urgent plea for military aid to help stop Erwin Rommel's Afrika Korps from overrunning Egypt, the Suez Canal and the Arabian oil fields. The United States dispatched the squadron to the Middle East to reinforce the British forces there. Between 14 July and 2 August, aircrews departed Morrison Field, Florida for Egypt via the South Atlantic ferry route to Egypt by way of Brazil, Ascension Island, across Africa to the Sudan, and then north to Egypt. By mid-August, all crews had arrived in Egypt without a single loss. Ground personnel sailed from New York City on 16 July 1942 on the SS Pasteur for a month-long trip around South Africa and up the Red Sea to Suez, Egypt, arriving on 16 August 1942.

=== Western Desert Campaign ===
The squadron arrived at RAF Ismailia, Egypt, and began training with Royal Air Force (RAF) and South African Air Force Douglas Boston units in desert warfare tactics and navigation. A month of training included five combat missions in combined formations with the Bostons. It flew its first mission on its own on 31 August against enemy airfields at Daba (LG 105) and Fuka (LG 17) and port facilities at Matruh, Egypt.

The unit's first missions were night attacks. However, the lack of flame dampeners on its Mitchells made them easy targets for flak defenses and night fighters. Losses caused the withdrawal of the unit from night operations until its planes could be modified with "finger exhausts". The unit's first missions were flown to support forces opposing Rommel's final effort to break through to the Suez Canal at the Battle of Alam Halfa between 31 August and 4 September 1942. Both Allied and enemy forces had learned that the open nature of the western desert made it easy to disperse armored forces, making pinpoint bombing ineffective. As a result, the 12th Group adopted the RAF tactic of pattern bombing. Group Mitchells would fly at medium altitude, flying spaced apart to saturate a target area with bombs spaced to damage any vehicles or other objectives in a defined target area.

The RAF had established numerous Landing Grounds (Note: These were identified by LG plus a number. These stretched across northern Egypt and Libya and were used by both sides as the front moved.) These landing grounds had no defined runways, and as many as eighteen bombers could take off at the same time, headed directly into the wind. In early October, intelligence reports reported that Regia Aeronautica and Luftwaffe airplanes at two of these landing grounds, near Daba (LG 105) and Qattafa (LG 104), had been trapped by heavy rains. The squadron forces attacked the airfields on 9 October, destroying ten enemy aircraft and damaging an additional 22.

A few days later, the squadron began flying missions from LG 88, about 20 miles from the front lines. This move made them immediately available for strikes requested by the Eighth Army. Operations from LG 88 began just before the Second Battle of El Alamein began on 23 October. Eighteen ship formations from the 12th Group took off or landed every half-hour during daylight on 24 October. By 4 November, Rommel began withdraw and the squadron's main targets became columns of tanks, trucks and troops retreating to the west. until rains bogged down the advance, permitting Rommel to withdraw to Tunisia. By 14 December, the squadron was operating from Magrun Landing Ground (LG 142), also called Gambut No. 2, a satellite of RAF Gambut (LG 139). The new base was within range of German bases on Crete.

American forces under General Dwight D. Eisenhower landed in Algeria and Morocco, and were met by German divisions under Rommel's command. The situation became desperate as they drove the Americans back through the Kasserine Pass. The squadron helped break up an attack along the Mareth Line. The squadron's actions during the north African campaign earned it a Distinguished Unit Citation for its operations from primitive landing grounds under difficult weather and terrain conditions and, despite repeated enemy attacks on its advanced positions and limited resources, made a major contribution to the defeat of enemy forces in the Middle East.

=== Italian Campaign ===
From Hergla Airfield, Tunisia, the squadron attacked targets on Pantellaria and Sicily. Little more than a month later, the squadron supported Operation Husky, the invasion of Sicily. The group's advance party boarded LSTs for Licata Sicily, where they set up their first base in Europe at Ponte Olivo Airfield, flying their first mission from Italy on 5 August. An attack on Randazzo on 13 August was the last significant action of the unit as part of Ninth Air Force, which moved to England, and the squadron transferred to Twelfth Air Force. Most aircrews had served enough time in theater that they were rotated back to the United States and replaced by new aircrews fresh from the States. Later in August, the group moved to Gerbini Airfield, from which it struck bridges, tunnels and other targets to support Operation Baytown, the invasion of southern Italy. In September, the group flew missions every day to support the foothold around Salerno established during Operation Avalanche.

The squadron began operating out of Foggia Airfield, Italy in November 1943. It attacked German targets in support of the American Fifth Army, and in eastern Italy supporting the British Eighth Army. It attacked aerodromes, docks, marshaling yards, bridges, and other targets in Italy and the Balkans.

Shortly after the squadron moved to Gaudo Airfield in January 1944, it was directed to prepare for movement out of the Mediterranean Theater. On 8 February, the group sailed on the HMT Dilwara and the MS Batory from Taranto. Although some in the group hoped the move was a withdrawal from combat, the ships sailed east, passing through the Suez Canal on the way to India.

=== Burma Campaign ===
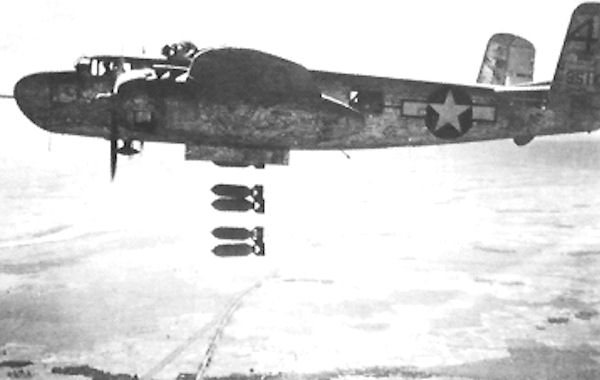
12th Group B-25H in bombing a target in Burma

The 12th Group moved to India to help the British Fourteenth Army repel a Japanese invasion from Burma toward Imphal, threatening the whole subcontinent and the Indian Ocean. The group's advance element arrived at Bombay on 12 March 1944, and the squadron arrived at Kurmitola Airfield on 21 March. The rear echelon of the unit did not arrive at the base in India until 24 April. In April, new B-25H and B-25J models began to arrive. The squadron equipped with a 50/50 mix of the two models. (Note: The H model had a 75mm cannon and .50 caliber machine guns in the nose and was flown by one pilot. The J had a glass nose with a navigator/bombardier position and had a pilot and copilot. Tucker & Bledsoe, p. 286.)

The squadron flew its first mission as part of Tenth Air Force, bombing Japanese supply dumps at Mogaung, Burma, on 16 April 1944. The lessened threat of flak in the new theater and added firepower of the updated Mitchells resulted in a change of tactics. Rather than the medium altitude pattern bombing the group specialized in the Mediterranean, the group now focused on low altitude bombing and strafing.

In April, Japanese forces that had broken out of the Burma mountains the previous month surrounded two Indian divisions at Imphal. The British still controlled the Imphal Airfield, however, and the 12th flew ammunition to the besieged troops, unloading the ammunition carried in the bomb bays of its Mitchells. The "ammo runs" continued for three weeks, until British forces repelled the Japanese invasion of India.

In June, the squadron moved to nearby Madhaiganj Airfield. This move added to the distance the group had to fly when attacking targets in Burma, sometimes requiring returning bombers to land at Comilla Airfield to refuel on their return flight. The logistics problems created by this move was lessened when the 434th began to operate from Comilla. This reduced the distance to most targets in Burma, but the group also flew missions to targets in northern Burma that tested the range of their B-25s. The first of these missions flown from Fenny Airfield was to Myitkyina to support Merrill's Marauders on 26 July.

The last major mission of the squadron was an overnight where the crews spent the night under the wings of their B-25s at Rameree, near Rangoon, and took off the next morning to bomb Ban-Takli airfield north of Bangkok, Thailand. The group began to equip with Douglas A-26 Invaders and were still training when the war ended. The squadron's aircrews flew the A-26s to Frankfurt, Germany, and the rest of the group waited at Fenny Airfield until they went to Karachi Airport in December to return to the United States.

On return to United States in January 1946, the squadron was inactivated at the port of embarkation the day after it arrived.

== Lineage ==
- Constituted as the 19th Reconnaissance Squadron (Light) on 20 November 1940

Activated on 15 January 1941
Redesignated 94th Bombardment Squadron (Light) on 14 August 1941
Redesignated 94th Reconnaissance Squadron (Medium) on 30 December 1941
Redesignated 434th Bombardment Squadron (Medium) on 22 April 1942
Redesignated 434th Bombardment Squadron, Medium 20 August 1944
Inactivated on 22 January 1946

=== Assignments ===
- 12th Bombardment Group: attached 15 January 1941, (Note: Probably assigned to the Northwest Air District, the headquarters to which the 12th Group was assigned.) assigned 14 August 1941 – 22 January 1946.

=== Stations ===
- McChord Field, Washington, 15 January 1941
- Esler Field, Louisiana, 27 February – 3 July 1942 (operated from Stockton Army Air Field, California, 24 May – 24 June 1942
- RAF Ismailia, Egypt, 14 August 1942
- Landing Ground 88, Egypt, 29 September 1942
- RAF Gambut, Libya, 5 December 1942
- Magrun Landing Ground, Libya, 14 December 1942
- RAF Gambut, Libya, 17 December 1942
- RAF Castel Benito, Libya, 16 February 1943
- El Assa Airfield, Libya, 8 March 1943
- Medenine Airfield, Tunisia, 3 April 1943
- Sfax Airfield, Tunisia, 17 April 1943
- Hergla Airfield, Tunisia, 2 June 1943
- Ponte Olivo Airfield, Sicily, Italy, 2 August 1943
- Gerbini Airfield, Sicily, Italy, 22 August 1943
- Foggia Airfield, Italy, 2 November 1943
- Gaudo Airfield, Italy, 18 January-6 February 1944
- Kurmitola Airfield, India, 21 March 1944
- Madhaiganj Airfield, India, 13 June 1944
- Comilla Airfield, India, 21 July 1944
- Fenny Airfield, India, 27 November 1944 (operated from Magwe Airfield, Burma, 5–24 May 1945)
- Pandaveswar Airport, India, 17 September 1945
- Karachi Airport, India, 22 November-24 December 1945
- Fort Lawton, Washington, 21–22 January 1946

=== Aircraft ===
- Douglas B-18 Bolo, 1941–1942
- Douglas B-23 Dragon, 1941–1942
- North American B-25 Mitchell, 1942–1945
- Douglas A-26 Invader, 1945

=== Awards and campaigns ===
Award streamer	Award	Dates	Notes
	Distinguished Unit Citation	October 1942-17 August 1943	North Africa and Sicily 434th Bombardment Squadron

Campaign Streamer	Campaign	Dates	Notes
	Egypt-Libya	14 August 1942–12 February 1943	434th Bombardment Squadron
	Air Combat, EAME Theater	14 August 1942–6 February 1944	434th Bombardment Squadron
	Tunisia	12 November 1942–13 May 1943	434th Bombardment Squadron
	Sicily	14 May 1943–17 August 1943	434th Bombardment Squadron
	Naples-Foggia	18 August 1943–21 January 1944	434th Bombardment Squadron
	Rome-Arno	22 January 1944–6 February 1944	434th Bombardment Squadron
	Air Combat, EAME Theater	14 August 1942–6 February 1944	434th Bombardment Squadron
	India-Burma	21 March 1944–28 January 1945	434th Bombardment Squadron
	China Defensive	21 March 1944–4 May 1945	434th Bombardment Squadron
	Central Burma	29 January 1945–15 July 1945	434th Bombardment Squadron
