= 12th Operations Group =

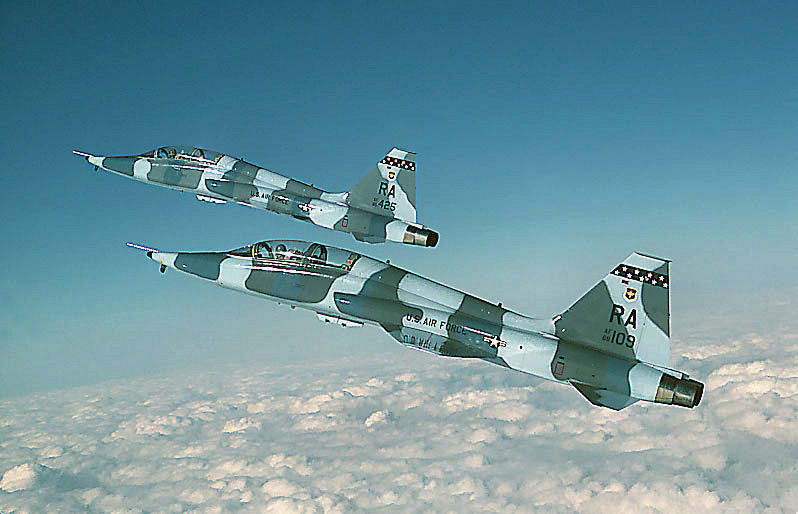
- Group T-38 Talons (Note: Aircraft are Northrop T-38C Talons, serials 68-82109 and 65-10475 of the group's 560th Flying Training Squadron.)
- Active: 1941–1946; 1947–1948; 1950–1952; 1991–present
- Country: United States
- Branch: United States Air Force
- Role: Flying Training
- Part of: Air Education and Training Command
- Garrison/HQ: Randolph Air Force Base
- Nickname: Earthquakers (Note: The name was supposedly derived from an interview with a German prisoner of war describing the reaction of the Germans to the group's formation bombing as an earthquake. The photojournalist conducting the interview used the title,"Earthquakers" on his captions of photos of the group. Tucker and Bledsoe, p. 282.)
- Motto: Spiritus Omnia Vincet Latin The Spirit Conquers All
- Engagements: Mediterranean Theater of Operations; China-Burma-India Theater
- Decorations: Distinguished Unit Citation; Air Force Outstanding Unit Award

Insignia
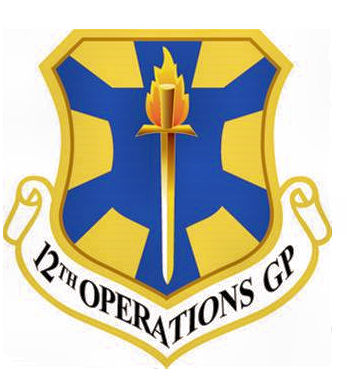
- 12th Operations Group emblem (Note: The group uses the 12th Wing emblem with the group designation on the scroll. Robertson, Factsheet, 12 Operations Group.)

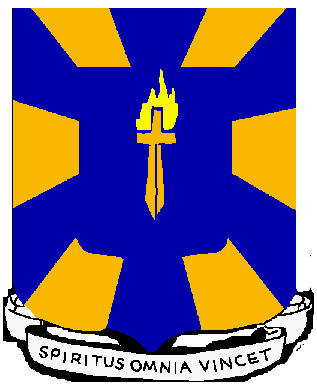
- 12th Bombardment Group emblem (approved 3 February 1942)

The 12th Operations Group is the flying component of the 12th Flying Training Wing of the United States Air Force's Air Education and Training Command. The group headquarters is located at Randolph Air Force Base, Texas. The unit's main missions include aircraft instructor pilot training in Beechcraft T-6 Texan II, Northrop T-38C Talon and Raytheon T-1 Jayhawk aircraft, Air Force and Navy undergraduate combat systems officer training and fighter fundamentals student pilot instructor training in the Northrop AT-38C.

The group was first activated in January 1941 as the 12th Bombardment Group. After training and flying antisubmarine patrols off the Pacific Coast, the group moved to Egypt in July 1942. In the Mediterranean Theater of Operations, it took part in the Western Desert campaign and Italian campaign, earning a Distinguished Unit Citation. In 1944, it moved to the China Burma India Theater and participated in the Burma campaign before the war's end. The unit returned to the United States in January 1946 and was inactivated on arriving at the port of embarkation.

The group was briefly active in 1947 to 1948, but was not manned or equipped due to budgetary restrictions. It was activated on 1 November 1950 as the 12th Fighter-Escort Group, but transferred its resources to the 12th Fighter-Escort Wing in February 1951 and was inactivated in June 1952 as Strategic Air Command adopted the dual deputy organization.

With the implementation of the Objective Wing Organization, the unit was activated on 15 December 1991, as the 12th Operations Group and assigned to the 12th Flying Training Wing.

== Components ==
The group contains seven squadrons(Tail Code: RA):

- 12th Operations Support Squadron
- 12th Training Squadron
- 99th Flying Training Squadron T-1A Jayhawk Instructor pilot training
- 435th Fighter Training Squadron T-38C Talon Introduction to Fighter Fundamentals
- 558th Flying Training Squadron Undergraduate RPA training
- 559th Flying Training Squadron T-6A Texan II Instructor pilot training
- 560th Flying Training Squadron T-38C Talon Instructor pilot training

== History ==
=== Organization and initial operations ===
The group was first activated as the 12th Bombardment Group at McChord Field, Washington on 15 January 1941 as the United States began building up its armed forces after the beginning of World War II in Europe, drawing its initial cadre from the 17th Bombardment Group. The 81st, 82d, and 83d Bombardment Squadrons were the group's first components, while the 19th Reconnaissance Squadron was attached to the 12th. Although designated a light bomber group, the unit was initially equipped with a mix of Douglas B-18 Bolo and Douglas B-23 Dragon medium bombers and a few Stearman PT-17 trainers. In August 1941, the Air Corps converted its reconnaissance squadrons attached to light bomber groups and the 19th Reconnaissance Squadron became the 94th Bombardment Squadron and was assigned to the group.

At the time of the Japanese Attack on Pearl Harbor, the group began flying antisubmarine patrols and watching for signs of an invasion. At the end of December 1941, the group was designated a medium bomber unit, consistent with its equipment. This resulted in the 94th Squadron again becoming a reconnaissance unit, as the 94th Reconnaissance Squadron. In February, the group moved to Esler Field, Louisiana, where it began converting to the North American B-25 Mitchell. With the Mitchells, the 94th resumed the bombardment mission, this time as the 434th Bombardment Squadron in April. In early May, the group deployed to Stockton Army Air Field, California, where half its crews stood alert during daylight hours. After the defeat of the Japanese Navy in the Battle of Midway, the group returned to Esler Field.

In June 1942, while in the United States for a conference with President Franklin D. Roosevelt, British Prime Minister Winston Churchill received word that the British Eighth Army had been defeated in a tank battle with Field Marshal Erwin Rommel's Afrika Korps near Tobruk, Libya, and was retreating back toward Alexandria, Egypt. Churchill immediately made an urgent plea for military aid to help stop Rommel from over-running Egypt, the Suez Canal and the Arabian oil fields. The United States dispatched the 12th and two other groups to the Middle East to reinforce the British forces there.

The 12th was the second of the three groups to leave the United States. Between 14 July and 2 August, aircrews departed Morrison Field, Florida for Egypt via the South Atlantic ferry route to Egypt by way of Brazil, Ascension Island, across Africa to the Sudan, and then north to Egypt. by mid-August, all crews had arrived in Egypt without a single loss. Ground personnel of all three groups and supporting units sailed from New York City on 16 July 1942 on the SS Pasteur, a fast French ocean liner that had been impressed by the British, for a month-long trip around South Africa and up the Red Sea to Suez, Egypt, arriving on 16 August 1942.

=== World War II ===
==== Western Desert Campaign ====
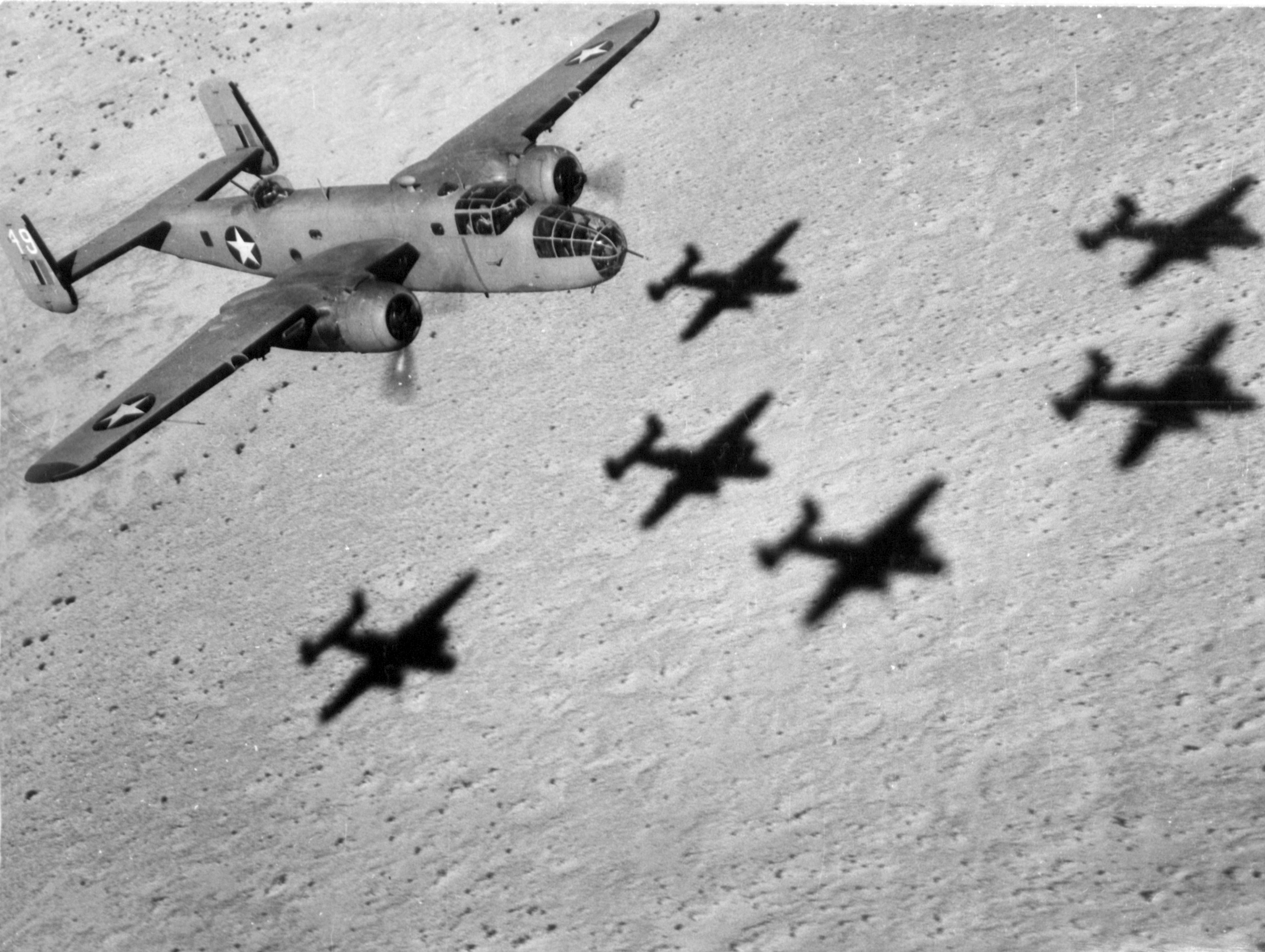
Formation of B-25 Mitchells over the Western Desert, 1943

As soon as they arrived in Egypt, group headquarters and the 81st and 82d Squadrons moved to RAF Deversoir, while the 83d and 434th Squadrons were at RAF Ismailia, about 15 miles apart on the Suez Canal. It began training with Royal Air Force (RAF) and South African Air Force Boston (Note: The Boston was the RAF version of the A-20 Havoc.) units in desert warfare tactics and navigation. A month of training included five combat missions in combined formations with the Bostons. The group flew its first mission on its own on 31 August against enemy airfields at Daba (LG 105) and Fuka (LG 17) and port facilities at Matruh, Egypt.

The group's first missions were night attacks. However, the lack of flame dampeners on its Mitchells made them easy targets for flak defenses and night fighters. Losses, which included the group commander, Colonel Goodrich, caused the withdrawal of the unit from night operations until its planes could be modified with "finger exhausts". The unit's first missions were flown to support forces opposing Rommel's final effort to break through to the Suez Canal at the Battle of Alam Halfa between 31 August and 4 September 1942. These missions helped the British Eighth Army repel the Afrika Corps attacks. Rommel attributed this defeat to air attacks enabled by the air superiority established by the RAF and Allied forces Both Allied and enemy forces had learned that the open nature of the western desert made it easy to disperse armored forces, making pinpoint bombing ineffective. As a result, the group adopted the RAF tactic of pattern bombing. Group Mitchells would fly at medium altitude, flying spaced apart to saturate a target area with bombs spaced to damage any vehicles or other objectives in a defined target area.

During the battles in north Africa, the RAF had established numerous Landing Grounds, identified by LG plus a number. These stretched across northern Egypt and Libya and were used by both sides as the front moved. These landing grounds had no defined runways, and as many as eighteen bombers could take off at the same time, headed directly into the wind. In early October, intelligence reports reported that Regia Aeronautica and Luftwaffe airplanes at two of these landing grounds, near Daba (LG 105) and Qattafa (LG 104), had been trapped by heavy rains. The 12th Group and RAF forces attacked the airfields on 9 October, destroying ten enemy aircraft and damaging an additional 22.

A few days later, the operational elements of the group, consisting of the combat crews and a few essential ground personnel needed to keep the B-25s flying, began flying missions from LG 88, about 20 miles from the front lines. This move made them immediately available for strikes requested by the Eighth Army. The bulk of each squadron and headquarters remained behind at their bases near the Suez Canal. Operations from LG 88 began on the night of 19/20 October, just before the Second Battle of El Alamein began on 23 October with a tremendous artillery bombardment. The 12th Group began a week-long shuttle missions, attacking targets phoned in to Eighth Army Air Liaison Officers attached to the group. Eighteen ship formations took off or landed every half-hour during daylight on 24 October. There was little rest as ground crews rushed to refuel, reload bombs and ammunition, and patch flak holes, with operations peaking on 27 October. By 4 November, Rommel began withdraw and main targets became columns of tanks, trucks and troops retreating to the west. Group operational elements advanced to new Landing Grounds to keep up with ground troops, sometimes having to ferry munitions from their old bases to their new stations. Support equipment could not keep up with this rapid advance, and the forward elements depended on commandeered German and Italian materiel until rains bogged down the advance, permitting Rommel to withdraw to Tunisia.

By 14 December, the advanced elements of the group were operating from Magrun Landing Ground (LG 142), also called Gambut No. 2, a satellite of RAF Gambut (LG 139), stretching the group over 1200 miles of north Africa. The new base was within range of German bases on Crete, and a raid was planned for 2 January 1943. However to reach this target, dust filters had to be removed from the attack force's engines to increase range. Just as the Mitchells were taking off, a dust storm hit the Landing Ground and only twelve planes were able to fly the mission, which had little effect on enemy forces.

American forces under General Dwight D. Eisenhower landed in Algeria and Morocco, and were met by German divisions under Rommel's command. The situation became desperate as they drove the Americans back through the Kasserine Pass. To reinforce Twelfth Air Force, the 81st and 82d Squadrons of the 12th Group were dispatched to reinforce the 310th Bombardment Group at Berteaux Airfield, Algeria on 3 and 4 February 1943. These two squadrons continued operating under the Twelfth Air Force until the fall of Tunis in May 1943, when they were returned to the group. Meanwhile, the 83d and 434th Squadrons helped break up an attack along the Mareth Line. After the fall of Tunis, the 12th was reunited at Hergla Airfield, Tunisia, and all of the personnel of its squadrons were together again for the first time since their advance parties moved out into the desert eight months earlier.

The group's actions during the north African campaign earned it a Distinguished Unit Citation for its operations from primitive landing grounds under difficult weather and terrain conditions and, despite repeated enemy attacks on its advanced positions and limited resources, made a major contribution to the defeat of enemy forces in the Middle East.

==== Italian Campaign ====
From Hergla, the group attacked targets on Pantellaria and Sicily. Little more than a month later, Operation Husky, the invasion of Sicily, was executed and the 12th flew missions supporting the advances on that island. The group's advance party boarded LSTs for Licata Sicily, where they set up their first base in Europe at Ponte Olivo Airfield, flying the group's first mission from Italy on 5 August. An attack on Randazzo on 13 August was the last significant action of the 12th as part of the Ninth Air Force, which moved to England, while the 12th became part of Twelfth Air Force. Major personnel changes occurred as most of the group's aircrews had served enough time in theater that they were rotated back to the United States and replaced by new aircrews fresh from the States. (Note: This included about 25 radio operator/gunners from the Royal Canadian Air Force, who had been attached to the group when it began operations in Egypt. Tucker & Bledsoe, p. 284.) Later in August, the group moved to Gerbini Airfield on Sicily, from which it struck bridges, tunnels and other targets to support Operation Baytown, the invasion of southern Italy. In September, the group flew missions every day to support the foothold around Salerno established during Operation Avalanche.

The group began operating out of Foggia Airfield, Italy in November 1943. The 12th attacked German targets in support of the American Fifth Army, and in eastern Italy supporting the British Eighth Army. It attacked aerodromes, docks, marshaling yards, bridges, and other targets in Italy and the Balkans.

Shortly after the group's combat elements moved to Gaudo Airfield in January 1944, the group was directed to prepare for movement out of the Mediterranean Theater. On 8 February, the group sailed on the SS Dilwara and the MS Batory from Taranto. Although some in the group hoped the move was a withdrawal from combat, the ships sailed east, passing through the Suez Canal on the way to India.

==== Burma Campaign ====
The 12th Group moved to India to help the British Fourteenth Army repel a Japanese invasion from Burma toward Imphal, threatening the whole subcontinent and the Indian Ocean. The group's advance element arrived at Bombay on 12 March 1944, and after a four-day train trip to Calcutta and a day on a river boat to Dacca in eastern Bengal, group headquarters and the 81st and 82d Squadrons were established at Tezgaon Airfield, India, while the 83d and 434th Squadrons were at Kurmitola Airfield. The rear echelon of the unit did not arrive at the new bases in India until 24 April. In April, new B-25H (Note: Among the B-25Hs delivered to the group was the 1000th and last one manufactured. Tucker & Bledsoe, p. 286.) and B-25J models began to arrive. The group equipped each of its squadrons with a 50/50 mix of the two models. (Note: The H model had a 75mm cannon and .50 caliber machine guns in the nose and was flown by one pilot. The J had a glass nose with a navigator/bombardier position and had a pilot and copilot. Tucker & Bledsoe, p. 286.)

The 12th flew its first mission as part of Tenth Air Force, bombing Japanese supply dumps at Mogaung, Burma, on 16 April 1944. The lessened threat of flak in the new theater and added firepower of the updated Mitchells the group now flew resulted in a change of tactics. Rather than the medium altitude pattern bombing the group specialized in the Mediterranean, the group now focused on low altitude bombing and strafing.

In April, Japanese forces that had broken out of the Burma mountains the previous month surrounded two Indian divisions at Imphal. The British still controlled the Imphal Airfield, however, and the 12th flew ammunition to the besieged troops, unloading the ammunition carried in the bomb bays of its Mitchells. The "ammo" runs continued for three weeks, until British forces repelled the Japanese invasion of India.

In June, the group and two squadrons moved to Pandaveswar Airfield, India, while the 81st and 434th Squadrons moved to nearby Madhaiganj Airfield. This move added to the distance the group had to fly when attacking targets in Burma, sometimes requiring returning bombers to land at Comilla Airfield to refuel on their return flight. The logistics problems created by this move was lessened when the group moved to Fenny Airfield, while the 434th began to operate from Comilla. This reduced the distance to most targets in Burma, but the group also flew missions to targets in northern Burma that tested the range of their B-25s. The first of these missions flown from Fenny was to Myitkyina to support Merrill's Marauders on 26 July.

After some vicious fighting, the British captured Meiktila on 3 March and swept down the road to Mandalay, which was defended by 400-year-old Fort Dufferin complete with high thick walls and a wide moat. The 12th was called upon to bomb the fort on 9 March 1945, which they did successfully with 2000-pound bombs dropped from 200 feet by four Mitchells, followed by attacks from 6000 feet by another squadron, and a 35-ship blasting of the entire area of the fort to complete the job.

The last major mission of the 12th was an overnight where the crews spent the night under the wings of their B-25s at Rameree, near Rangoon, and took off the next morning to bomb Ban-Takli airfield north of Bangkok, Thailand. The group began to equip with Douglas A-26 Invaders and were still training when the war ended. The group's aircrews flew the A-26s to Frankfurt, Germany, and the rest of the group waited at Fenny Airfield until they went to Karachi Airport in December to return to the United States.

On return to United States in January 1946, the 12th Bombardment Group was inactivated at the port of embarkation.

=== Assignment to Tactical Air Command ===
The unit was again designated the 12th Bombardment Group, Light and was activated on 19 May 1947 under Tactical Air Command as part of the Air Force's expansion to its peacetime goal of 70 combat groups. Although nominally stationed at Langley Air Force Base, Virginia, the unit was neither manned or equipped and only existed on paper. President Truman's reduced 1949 defense budget required reductions in the number of Air Force groups to 48, and the 12th was inactivated on 10 September 1948.

=== Fighter escort operations ===
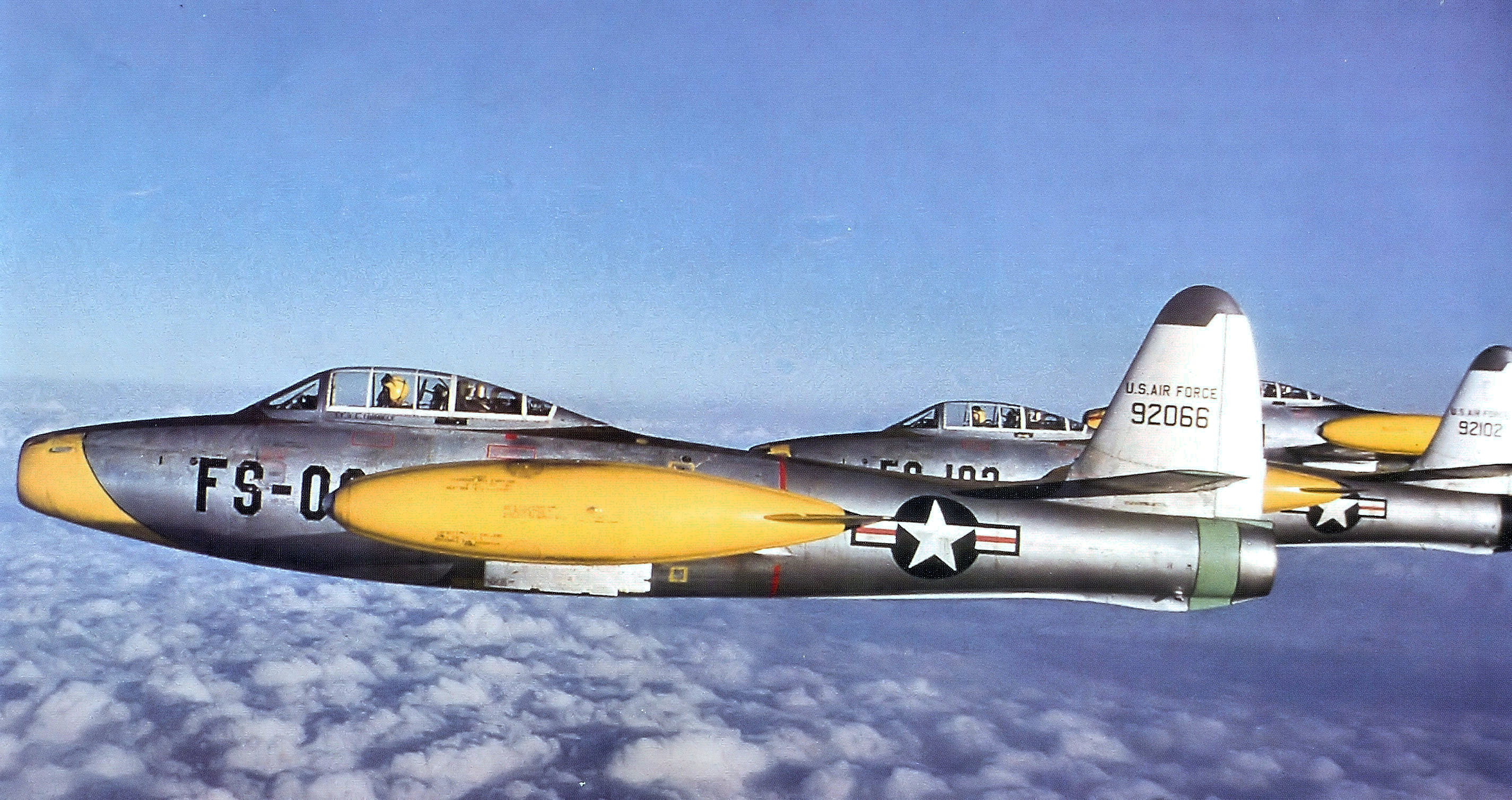
Group F-84 Thunderjets (Note: Aircraft in foreground is Republic F-84E-1-RE Thunderjet, serial 49-2066. This aircraft was flown to RAF Manston, where it was transferred to the 123d Fighter-Bomber Group.)

The 12th Fighter-Escort Group was activated at Turner Air Force Base, Georgia on 1 November 1950 as the flying element of the 12th Fighter-Escort Wing under the wing base organization system. The 559th, 560th and 561st Fighter-Escort Squadrons were assigned to the group. (Note: These were the group's three original squadrons. Because the 81st through 83d Fighter Squadrons already existed, the squadrons were given new numbers when they became fighter units.) The group's mission was to fly fighter escort for Strategic Air Command strategic bombers.

As the group was organizing, the 27th Fighter-Escort Wing at Bergstrom Air Force Base, Texas deployed to Japan. The 12th Group moved to Bergstrom in December, and was filled out by personnel from the 27th that had not deployed and personnel that had been transferred from the 31st Fighter-Escort Group at Turner. On 12 December the group received its first Republic F-84E Thunderjets. These aircraft, however, were rejected as Republic Aviation had equipped them with an engine that was incapable of supporting the extended bomber escort missions projected by SAC.

Strategic Air Command (SAC)'s mobilization for the Korean War highlighted that SAC wing commanders focused too much on running the base organization and were not spending enough time on overseeing combat preparations. To allow wing commanders the ability to focus on combat operations, the air base group commander became responsible for managing the base housekeeping functions. Under the plan finalized in June 1952, the wing commander focused primarily on the combat units and the maintenance necessary to support combat aircraft by having the combat and maintenance squadrons report directly to the wing and eliminating the intermediate group structures. In February 1951, the group's three squadrons were attached to the wing and the group was reduced to paper status. When the reorganization was finalized, the group was inactivated and the squadrons reassigned.

=== Flying training ===
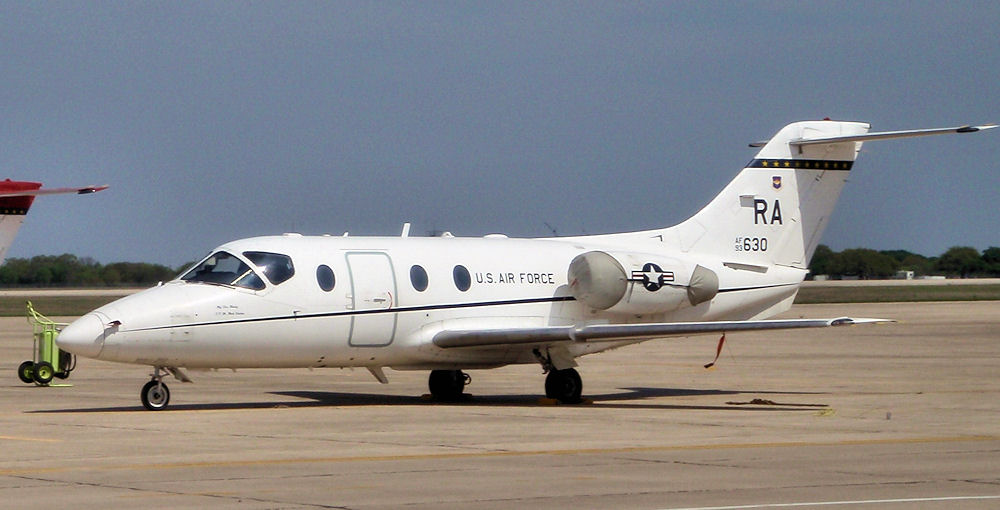
Beechcraft T-1A Jayhawk 93-0630, 99th FTS

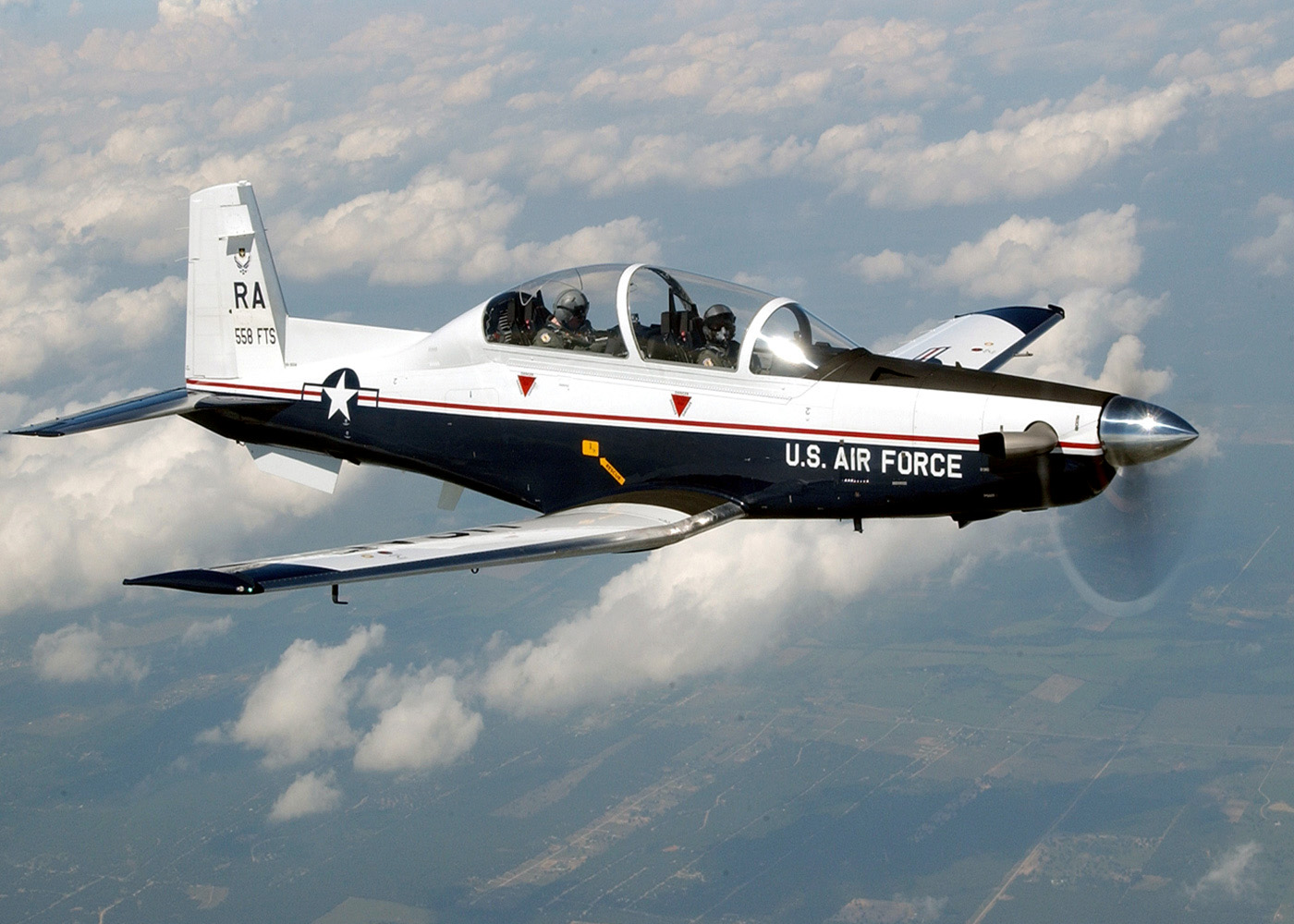
T-6A Texan II of the 558th FTS

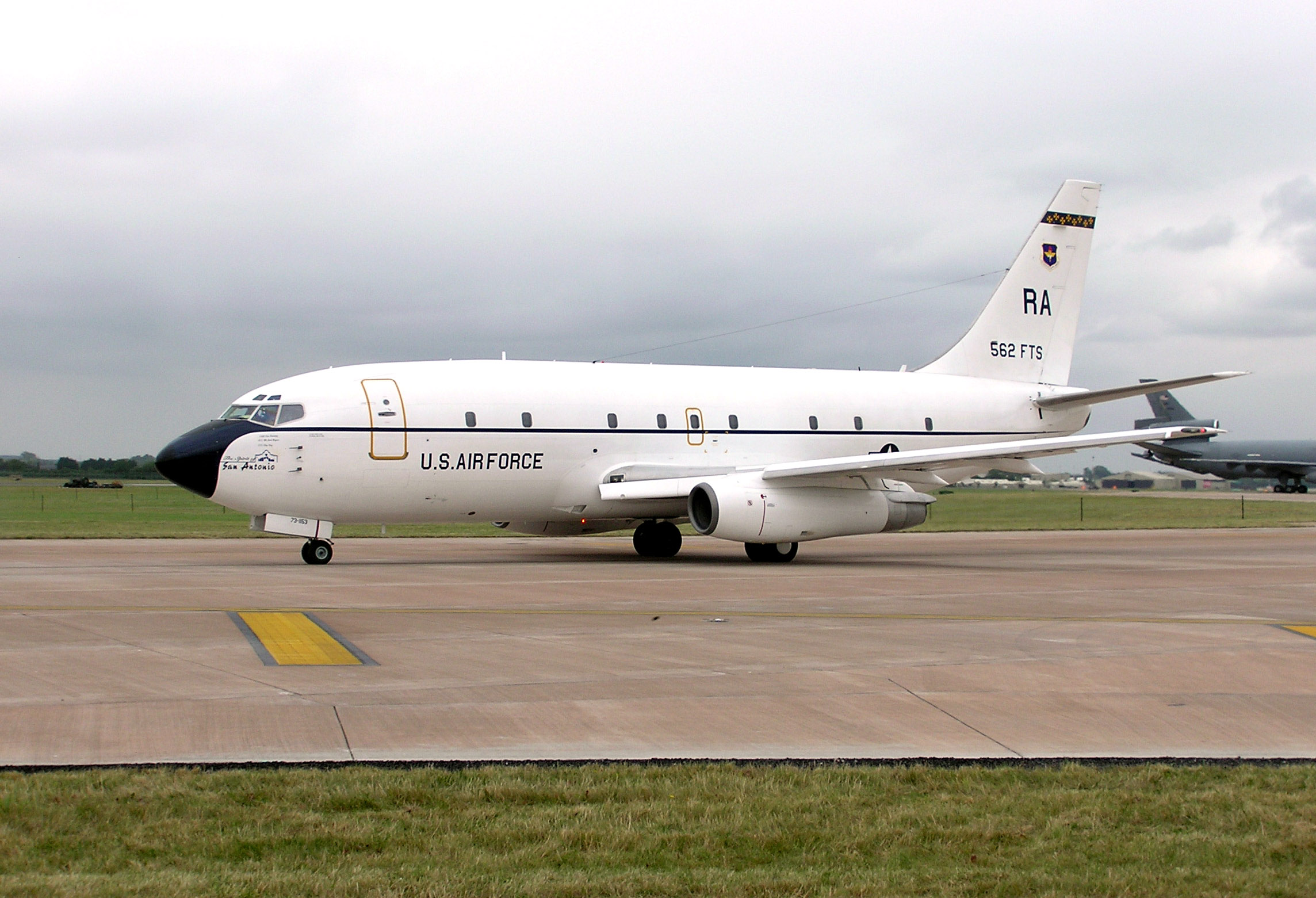
Boeing T-43A-BN 73-1153 of the 562d FTS

The group was reactivated at Randolph Air Force Base, Texas on 9 December 1991 as the 12th Operations Group and assigned to the 12th Flying Training Wing as part of the Objective Wing reorganization by the Air Force. The new group performed flight screening and undergraduate pilot training. Due to impending closure of Mather Air Force Base, California, in 1992 group assumed undergraduate navigator training which was moved from Mather. Also, conducted specialized undergraduate pilot training. In 1995, began transition to joint navigator training.

== Lineage ==
- Established as the 12th Bombardment Group (Light) on 20 November 1940

Activated on 15 January 1941
Redesignated 12th Bombardment Group (Medium) on 30 December 1941
Redesignated 12th Bombardment Group, Medium on 20 August 1944
Inactivated on 22 January 1946

- Redesignated 12th Bombardment Group, Light on 29 April 1947

Activated on 19 May 1947
Inactivated on 10 September 1948

- Redesignated 12th Fighter-Escort Group on 27 October 1950

Activated on 1 November 1950
Inactivated on 16 June 1952
Redesignated 12th Tactical Fighter Group on 31 July 1985 (Remained inactive)

- Redesignated 12th Operations Group on 9 December 1991

Activated on 15 December 1991

=== Assignments ===
- Northwest Air District (later, Second Air Force), 15 January 1941
- 4th Air Support Command, 3 September 1941
- 5th Air Support Command, 21 January 1942
- III Bomber Command, 18 April 1942
- Ninth Air Force, 16 August 1942
- Twelfth Air Force, 22 August 1943
- XII Air Support Command, 1 September 1943
- XII Bomber Command, 2 January 1944
- Tenth Air Force, c. 21 March 1944
- Unknown, c. 24 December 1945 – 22 January 1946
- Tactical Air Command, 19 May 1947 – 10 September 1948
- 12th Fighter-Escort Wing, 1 November 1950 – 16 June 1952
- 12th Flying Training Wing, 15 December 1991 – present

=== Components ===
Squadrons

- 1st Flight Screening Squadron (later 1st Flying Training Squadron): 15 December 1991 – 1 April 1994
- 3d Flying Training Squadron: 1 April 1994 – 7 April 2000
- 19th Reconnaissance Squadron (later 94th Bombardment Squadron, 94th Reconnaissance Squadron, 434th Bombardment Squadron): attached 15 January-13 August 1941, assigned 14 August 1941 – 22 January 1946
- 21st Test and Evaluation Squadron: 15 September 1992 – 31 March 1994
- 81st Bombardment Squadron (later 559th Fighter-Escort Squadron, 559th Flying Training Squadron): 15 January 1941 – 22 January 1946; 19 May 1947 – 10 September 1948; 1 November 1950 – 16 June 1952 (attached to 12th Fighter-Escort Wing after 10 February 1951); 15 December 1991–present
- 82d Bombardment Squadron (later 560th Fighter-Escort Squadron, 560th Flying Training Squadron): 15 January 1941 – 22 January 1946; 19 May 1947 – 10 September 1948; 1 November 1950 – 16 June 1952 (attached to 12th Fighter-Escort Wing after 10 February 1951); 15 December 1991 – present
- 83d Bombardment Squadron (later 561st Fighter-Escort Squadron): 15 January 1941 – 22 January 1946; 19 May 1947 – 10 September 1948; 1 November 1950 – 16 June 1952 (attached to 12th Fighter-Escort Wing after 10 February 1951)
- 99th Flying Training Squadron: 14 May 1993 – present
- 434th Bombardment Squadron: see 19th Reconnaissance Squadron)
- 435th Flying Training Squadron (later 435th Fighter Training Squadron): 14 May 1998 – 1 October 2001, 2 March 2007 – present
- 557th Flying Training Squadron: 1 July 1993 – 1 October 2000
- 558th Flying Training Squadron: 15 December 1992 – 1 October 1996; 16 January 2002 – present
- 562d Flying Training Squadron: 14 May 1993 – 19 November 2010
- 563d Flying Training Squadron: 14 May 1993 – 3 June 1996; 30 April 1999–19 November 2010
- 3307th Test and Evaluation Squadron: 15 December 1991 – 15 September 1992 (Note: The 21st Test and Evaluation Squadron and the 3307th Test and Evaluation Squadron were consolidated after being reassigned from the group. Haulman, Daniel L., Lineage and Honors History of the Air Education and Training Command Studies and Analysis Squadron (AETC), Air Force Historical Research Agency. 6 January 1998.)

Flight

- 332d Airlift Flight: 15 April 1993 – 1 April 1997

=== Stations ===
- McChord Field, Washington, 15 January 1941
- Esler Field, Louisiana, c. 21 February-3 July 1942
- RAF Deversoir, Egypt, c. 31 July 1942 (group headquarters and support elements after October 1942)
- Egypt and Libya, c October 1942-c April 1943 (Note: Beginning in October 1942, the group assumed a split operation, with supporting and operational elements at different locations. See the narrative above for locations of group elements during this time.)

LG 88, Egypt 30°50′05″N 029°51′05″E, 18 October 1942
Gambut Airfield, Libya, 6 December 1942
Magrun Landing Ground (LG 142), Libya 31°28′30″N 020°07′40″E, by 9 December 1942
El Chel Airfield, Libya
Misurata Airfield, Libya

- Medenine Airfield, Tunisia, 3 April 1943
- Sfax Airfield, Tunisia, c. 15 April 1943
- Hergla Airfield, Tunisia, 2 June 1943
- Ponte Olivo Airfield, Sicily, Italy, c. 2 August 1943
- Gerbini Airfield, Sicily, Italy, c. 22 August 1943
- Foggia Airfield, Italy, c. 2 November 1943
- Gaudo Airfield, Italy, 19 January-6 February 1944
- Tezgaon Airfield, India, c. 21 March 1944
- Pandaveswar Airfield, India, 13 June 1944
- Fenny Airfield, India, 16 July 1944
- Pandaveswar Airfield, India, 8 June 1945
- Karachi Airport, India, 15 November-24 December 1945
- Fort Lawton, Washington, 21–22 January 1946
- Langley Field (later Langley Air Force Base), Virginia, 19 May 1947 – 10 September 1948
- Turner Air Force Base, Georgia, 1 November 1950
- Bergstrom Air Force Base, Texas, 5 December 1950 – 16 June 1952
- Randolph Air Force Base (later Joint Base San Antonio-Randolph Air Force Base), Texas, 15 December 1991 – present

=== Aircraft ===
- Douglas B-18 Bolo, 1941–1942
- Douglas B-23 Dragon, 1941–1942
- Stearman PT-17, 1941–1942
- North American B-25 Mitchell, 1942–1945
- Douglas A-26 Invader, 1945
- Republic F-84 Thunderjet, 1950–1951
- Cessna T-37 Tweet, 1991–present
- Northrop T-38 Talon, 1991–present
- North American T-39 Sabreliner, 1991
- Cessna T-41 Mescalero, 1992–1994
- Boeing T-43 Bobcat, 1992–present
- C-21 Learjet, 1993–1997
- Northrop AT-38 Talon, 1993–2002
- Raytheon T-1 Jayhawk, 1993–present
- T-3 Firefly, 1994–1998
- Beechcraft T-6 Texan II, 2000–present

=== Awards and campaigns ===
Award streamer	Award	Dates	Notes
	Distinguished Unit Citation	October 1942 – 17 August 1943	12th Bombardment Group
	Air Force Outstanding Unit Award	15 December 1991 – 31 December 1991	12th Operations Group
	Air Force Outstanding Unit Award	1 January 1992 – 30 June 1993	12th Operations Group
	Air Force Outstanding Unit Award	1 July 1993 – 30 June 1994	12th Operations Group
	Air Force Outstanding Unit Award	1 July 1995 – 30 June 1996	12th Operations Group
	Air Force Outstanding Unit Award	1 July 1996 – 30 June 1998	12th Operations Group
	Air Force Outstanding Unit Award	1 July 1998 – 30 June 2000	12th Operations Group
	Air Force Outstanding Unit Award	1 July 2002 – 30 June 2004	12th Operations Group
	Air Force Outstanding Unit Award	1 July 2004 – 30 June 2006	12th Operations Group
	Air Force Outstanding Unit Award	1 July 2008 – 30 June 2009	12th Operations Group
	Air Force Outstanding Unit Award	1 July 2009 – 30 June 2011	12th Operations Group

Campaign Streamer	Campaign	Dates	Notes
	Air Combat, EAME Theater	c. 31 July 1942 – 11 May 1945	12th Bombardment Group
	Egypt-Libya	c. 31 July 1942 – 12 February 1943	12th Bombardment Group
	Tunisia	12 November 1942 – 13 May 1943	12th Bombardment Group
	Sicily	14 May 1943 – 17 August 1943	12th Bombardment Group
	Naples-Foggia	18 August 1943 – 21 January 1944	12th Bombardment Group
	Rome-Arno	22 January 1944 – 6 February 1944	12th Bombardment Group
	India-Burma	c. 31 March 1944 – 28 January 1945	12th Bombardment Group
	Central Burma	29 January 1945 – 15 July 1945	12th Bombardment Group
	China Defensive	4 July 1942 – 4 May 1945	12th Bombardment Group
