= Pandaveswar Airfield =

Abandoned US airfield in India from WW II

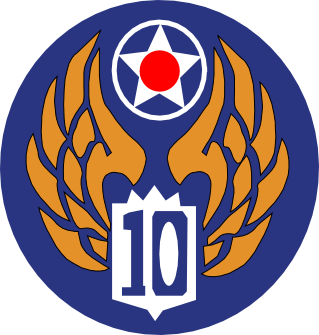
Pandaveswar Airfield
- Part of Tenth Air Force
- Pandaveswar, India

Site information
- Type: Military airfield
- Controlled by: United States Army Air Forces

Location
- Location within West Bengal Location within India
- Coordinates: 23°38′45.84″N 087°20′51.58″E

Pandaveswar Airfield is a former wartime United States Army Air Forces airfield in India used during the Burma Campaign 1944-1945. It is now abandoned.

== History ==
Pandaveswar was a major Tenth Air Force combat airfield, hosting numerous groups between 1942 and 1945. Known units assigned were:

- 7th Bombardment Group, 12 December 1942 – 17 January 1944 B-24 Liberator
- 12th Bombardment Group, 13 June-16 July 1944 B-25 Mitchell
- 4th Combat Cargo Group, November 1945-15 January 1946 C-46 Commando
- 8th Photographic Reconnaissance Group, 3 January-29 October 1943
- 427th Night Fighter Squadron, 31 October -23 December 1944 P-61 Black Widow

After the combat cargo unit moved out in January 1946, it appears the airfield was closed. Today, the remains of both main runways (16/34, 04/22) are visible in aerial photography, along with numerous dispersal pads in vegetative areas along with several taxiways. The majority of the support station has been dismantled, however some derelict buildings and streets can still be seen, along with a village that appears to have been built on the site.
