= Habit Awlad Muhammad Airport =

- IATA: none; ICAO: HL78

Summary
- Airport type: Civil
- Operator: Government
- Location: Libya
- Elevation AMSL: 2,000 ft / 610 m
- Coordinates: 30°42′00″N 12°29′05″E

Map

Runways
Direction	Length		Surface
Direction	m	ft	Surface
17/35	2,360	7,743	Asphalt
- Source: GCM Google Maps

Habit Awlad Muhammad Airport is an airport in the Jabal al Gharbi District of Libya, located approximately 266 kilometres (165 mi) south-southwest of Tripoli in the Libyan desert. Its primary use is the transportation of oilfield workers from production facilities in the area.

== World War II ==
During World War II the airfield, then known as Tmed El Chel Airfield was used as a military airfield by the United States Army Air Force during the North African Campaign against Axis forces.

USAAF Ninth Air Force units which used the airfield were:

- 81st Bombardment Squadron, (12th Bombardment Group), 11 January-3 February 1943, B-25 Mitchell
- 82d Bombardment Squadron, (12th Bombardment Group), 10 January-4 February 1943, B-25 Mitchell

== See also ==
- Transport in Libya
- List of airports in Libya
