= Hergla Airfield =

Abandoned World War II military airfield in Tunisia

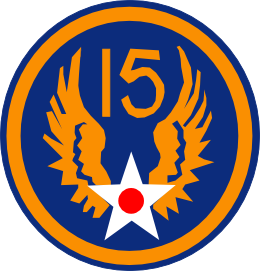
Hergla Airfield

Site information
- Type: Military airfield
- Controlled by: United States Army Air Forces

Location
- Coordinates: 36°08′05.06″N 010°26′14.85″E

Site history
- Built: 1943
- In use: 1943

Location of Hergla Airfield, Tunisia

Hergla Airfield is an abandoned military airfield in Tunisia, located approximately 12 km north-northwest of Harqalah in al Janubiyah Wilayat province, about 90 km south-southwest of Tunis.

During World War II it was used by the United States Army Air Force during the North African Campaign as a bomber base, first for medium, and later for heavy bombers.

- 12th Bombardment Group, 2 June-2 August 1943, B-25 Mitchell
- 98th Bombardment Group, 22 September-22 November 1943, B-24 Liberator (15AF/12AF)
- 340th Bombardment Group, 2 June-2 August 1943, B-25 Mitchell (9AF)

Primary targets from Hergla were in Sicily and mainland Italy. As targets moved out of range, the groups moved to Italy and by November 1943 the airfield was closed. When the Americans moved out, the base was largely abandoned. For many years only faint evidence of the main runway and some taxiways were visible in aerial photos of the area, but the land had returned largely to its natural state. The Enfidha – Hammamet International Airport was built in its place and opened in 2009.
