= 321st Regiment =

321st Regiment may refer to:

- 321st Armored Cavalry Regiment, United States
- 321st Cavalry Regiment, United States
- 321st Field Artillery Regiment, United States

== See also ==
- 1st Battalion, 321st Field Artillery Regiment
- 2nd Battalion, 321st Field Artillery Regiment
- 3rd Battalion, 321st Field Artillery Regiment
- 321st (disambiguation)
