= 321st =

321st may refer to:

- 321st Air Expeditionary Group (321 AEG), a provisional United States Air Force Air Combat Command unit
- 321st Air Expeditionary Wing, a United States Air Force unit assigned United States Air Forces Central (USAFCENT)
- 321st Air Refueling Squadron, an inactive United States Air Force unit
- 321st Division (Imperial Japanese Army), active 23 May 1945–1945
- 321st Engineer Battalion (United States), Army Reserve battalion during World War II and Operation Iraqi Freedom
- 321st Field Artillery Regiment (FAR), a field artillery regiment of the United States Army
  - 1st Battalion, 321st Field Artillery Regiment (1-321 FAR), an inactive field artillery battalion of the United States Army
  - 2nd Battalion, 321st Field Artillery Regiment (2-321 FAR), an inactive field artillery battalion of the United States Army
  - 3rd Battalion, 321st Field Artillery Regiment (3-321 FAR), an artillery battalion assigned to the 18th Field Artillery Brigade
- 321st Fighter-Interceptor Squadron, inactive United States Air Force unit
- 321st Missile Squadron, United States Air Force unit
- 321st Missile Wing LGM-30 Minuteman Missile Launch Sites Missile Alert Facilities and Launch Facilities
- 321st Rifle Division (Soviet Union), formed 1941 as a standard Red Army rifle division
- 321st Special Tactics Squadron, active ground unit within the 752d Special Operations Group, United States Air Force
- 321st Sustainment Brigade (United States), sustainment brigade of the United States Army Reserve

== See also ==
- 321 (number)
- 321, the year 321 (CCCXXI) of the Julian calendar
- 321 BC
