= 377th Field Artillery Regiment =

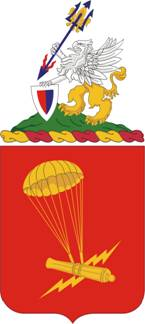
- Coat of arms
- Active: 1921-present
- Country: United States
- Branch: United States Army
- Type: Field Artillery
- Role: USARS parent regiment
- Size: regiment
- Mottos: FIRMITER ET FIDELITER (Steadfastly and Faithfully)

Insignia
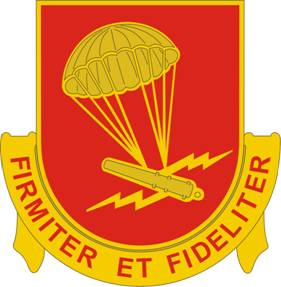
- Distinctive unit insignia

The 377th Field Artillery Regiment is a field artillery regiment of the United States Army. A parent regiment under the U.S. Army Regimental System, the regiment's 2nd Battalion, 377th Field Artillery Regiment is assigned to the 2nd Infantry Brigade Combat Team (Airborne), 11th Airborne Division. Elements of the regiment have also served with the 101st Airborne Division and 82nd Airborne Division, and have seen service in World War II, Vietnam, and in both Iraq and Afghanistan during the Global War on Terror. The 1st and 3rd Battalions as well as Batteries D and E are Inactive.

== History ==
The 377th Field Artillery Regiment was constituted in the Organized Reserves as a 75mm gun regiment in the 101st Division on 24 June 1921. Allotted to the Sixth Corps Area, the regiment was initiated on 27 October 1921. The regimental headquarters was at Green Bay, Wisconsin; 1st Battalion at Oshkosh, Wisconsin; and the 2nd Battalion at Hudson, Wisconsin, but relocated to Waupaca, Wisconsin. The regiment conducted summer training at Camp Sparta/McCoy, Wisconsin, and at Camp Knox, Kentucky.

=== World War II ===
First activated on 16 August 1942 at Camp Claiborne, Louisiana, as the 377th Parachute Field Artillery Battalion (377th PFAB). The 377th PFAB, under the command of Lieutenant Colonel Benjamin Weisberg, participated in the development of doctrine for the employment of Parachute Artillery. After training in the United States, the battalion sailed to England, arriving in Liverpool on 18 October 1943.

Based at Benham Valence, Berkshire, England, the battalion conducted additional training in preparation for Operation Overlord.

==== Normandy ====
On 6 June 1944, the 377th PFAB participated in Operation Overlord, the Normandy Invasion, parachuting onto Drop Zone A east of St. Mere Eglise in support of the 502nd Parachute Infantry Regiment. The drop went poorly, and the battalion lost 11 of its 12 75mm pack howitzers. The Paratroopers of the battalion fought as infantrymen until replacement howitzers arrived on 14 June 1944. On 7 June 1944, 33 artillerymen from the battery, under the command of Lt Thomas Swirczynski captured 130 Germans near Hau-des-dunes. Other artillerymen from the battery served with other artillery units, manning salvaged US pieces and even two captured German howitzers. By 14 June 1944, the battery was consolidated and re-armed with new howitzers landed over the Normandy beaches. The battalion executive officer, Major Louis H. Cotton, was wounded during the drop and had to be evacuated.

==== Operation Market-Garden ====
During Operation Market, the 377th PFAB landed on 19 September 1944 (D+2), occupied firing positions at the landing zone, and supported 1/506th PIR's defense against a German counterattack near Zon, as well as the 502nd PIR's attack from Best toward St. Oedenrode. The battalion remained near St. Oedenrode until it was withdrawn with the division to Camp Mourmelon in France.

=== After World War II ===
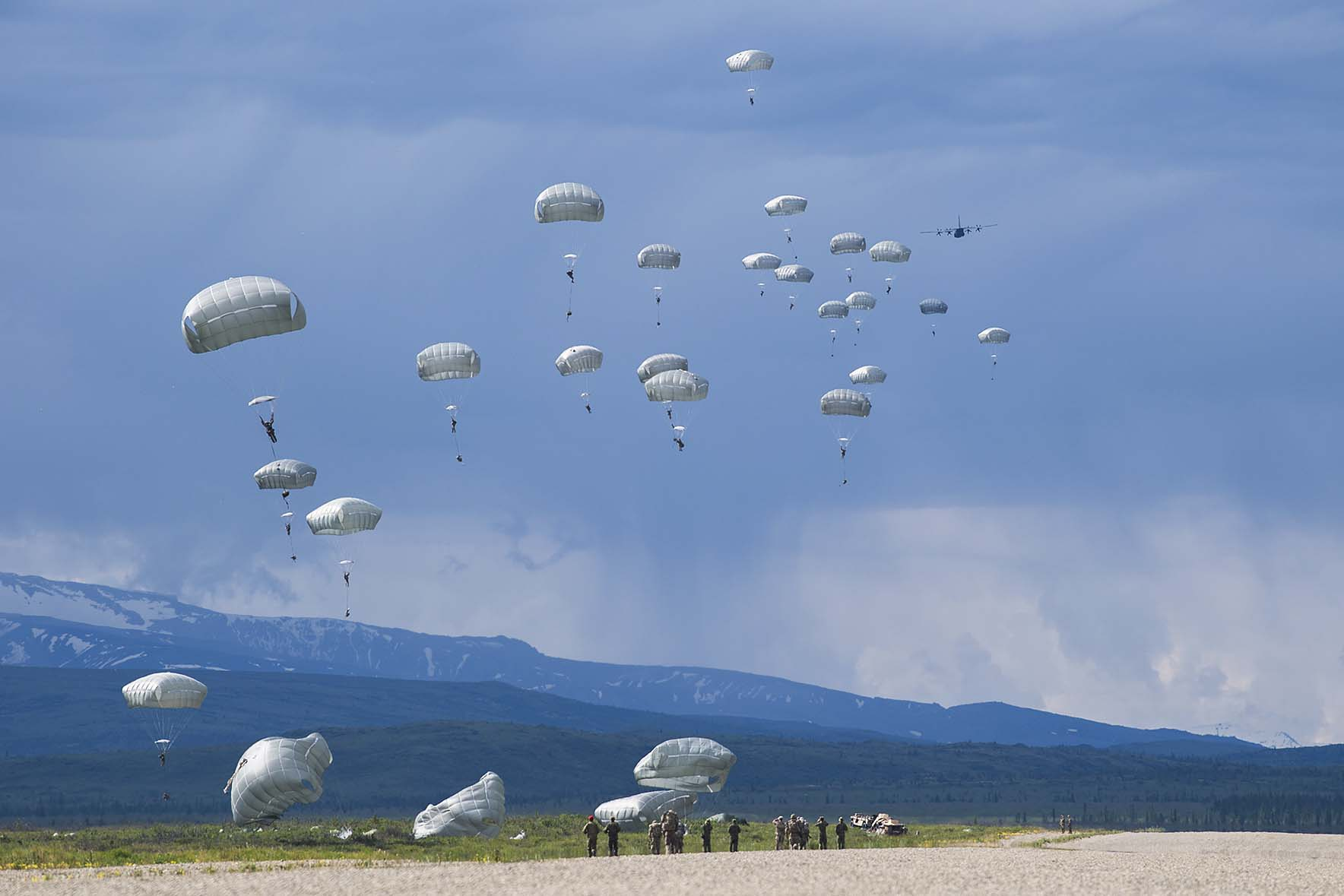
Members of the 377th perform a static line jump in the 2019 Red Flag – Alaska exercises

Inactivated on 30 November 1945 after the war's end, the 377th was redesignated on 18 June 1948 as the 515th Airborne Field Artillery Battalion, allotted to the Regular Army on 25 June 1948, and activated at Camp Breckinridge, Kentucky, as part of the 101st, then serving as a training division that was Airborne in name only. The battalion was inactivated on 15 April 1949 at Camp Breckinridge then reactivated on site on 25 August 1950, two months after the beginning of the Korean War. It was inactivated again on 1 December 1953 at Camp Breckinridge.

The unit was reactivated again in a training role in the 101st on 15 May 1954 at Fort Jackson, South Carolina, and redesignated on 1 July 1956 the 377th Airborne Field Artillery Battalion. It was reorganized and redesignated on 25 April 1957 as the 377th Artillery, a parent regiment under the Combat Arms Regimental System.

Under the Pentomic organization and the early Reorganization Objective Army Division, batteries of the regiment served as Honest John and Little John rocket batteries in the 101st (Battery A) and 82nd (Battery B) Airborne Divisions, while Battery C served with the 11th Airborne Division in Germany from 1957 to 1958. The rocket batteries were removed from the divisions and the batteries inactivated in the mid-1960s.

Battery C was redesignated as Headquarters and Headquarters Battery, 3d Battalion, 377th Artillery, and activated at Fort Benning, Georgia in 1963, but inactivated in 1965 when the 11th Air Assault Division (Test) (formed with the lineage of the 11th Airborne Division) was reflagged as the 1st Cavalry Division (Airmobile).

Battery A was reactivated as an aviation battery (and later, as a Target Acquisition and Aviation Battery) in the 101st Airborne Division, and served with the division from 1968 to 1986. During this time, Battery A served as an artillery aviation battery employing observation helicopters in South Vietnam. It earned campaign participation credit for eight campaigns and three Republic of Vietnam unit awards. In 1986 the division was reorganized under the Army of Excellence organization and the battery inactivated.

Battery B was reorganized and redesignated as Headquarters and Headquarters Battery, 2nd Battalion, 377th Artillery in 1974, and served as a Lance missile battalion in the 210th Field Artillery Group (later Brigade) at Herzo Base in Herzogenaurach, Germany, until 1987.

Battery A was reorganized and redesignated as Headquarters and Headquarters Battery, 1st Battalion, 377th Field Artillery and activated at Fort Bragg, North Carolina. It was equipped with the 155mm M198 Howitzer and M777 howitzer. It deployed to Iraq in 2003–2004. As a general support in the 101st Airborne Division Artillery, Battery C, 1-377th FA is credited in firing the first artillery rounds for the 101st Airborne, as they were at that moment attached to assist 3rd ID in the spear point of the invasion. The rest of the brigade followed after the asymmetric warfare was finished and met up with the battery in Mosul. The battalion participated in combat operations from Kuwait into northern Iraq. The battalion returned to Iraq for a second time in 2005–2006, and again in 2009–2010. On the third trip, they operated in the Basra area, providing security force assistance under the 17th Fires Brigade. Battery B and C of 1-377 FAR deployed out of Joint Base Lewis-McChord to Afghanistan from November 2011 to September 2012. The battalion served as a 155mm air assault unit with the 18th Field Artillery Brigade at Fort Bragg, and with the 17th Fires Brigade at Fort Lewis, Washington, before inactivating in 2013.

Battery B, 377th Field Artillery was activated in Afghanistan in December 2003, by reflagging a separate airborne battery, deployed from its home station in Alaska. The battery continued its missions in support of Task for Geronimo (1st Battalion, 501st Infantry Regiment), and earned Afghanistan campaign participation credit before returning to Alaska.

Battery B was reorganized and redesignated in 2005 as 2nd Battalion, 377th Field Artillery Regiment, informally known as 2nd Battalion, 377th Parachute Field Artillery Regiment, or 2-377 PFAR. (The Army dropped the use of "Parachute" as part of unit designations in the late 1940s.) The Battalion deployed to Iraq with the 4th BCT, 25th ID from 2006 to 2007, earning campaign participation credit for two campaigns. The 2nd Battalion deployed to Afghanistan with the 4th BCT, 25th ID from 2009 - 2010, and from 2011 to 2012, earning participation credit for three campaigns. 2-377 FAR is the field artillery battalion currently assigned to the 2nd Infantry Brigade Combat Team, 11th Airborne Division. Lieutenant Colonel Patrick Caruso is the current commander.

== Current Status of Regimental Elements ==
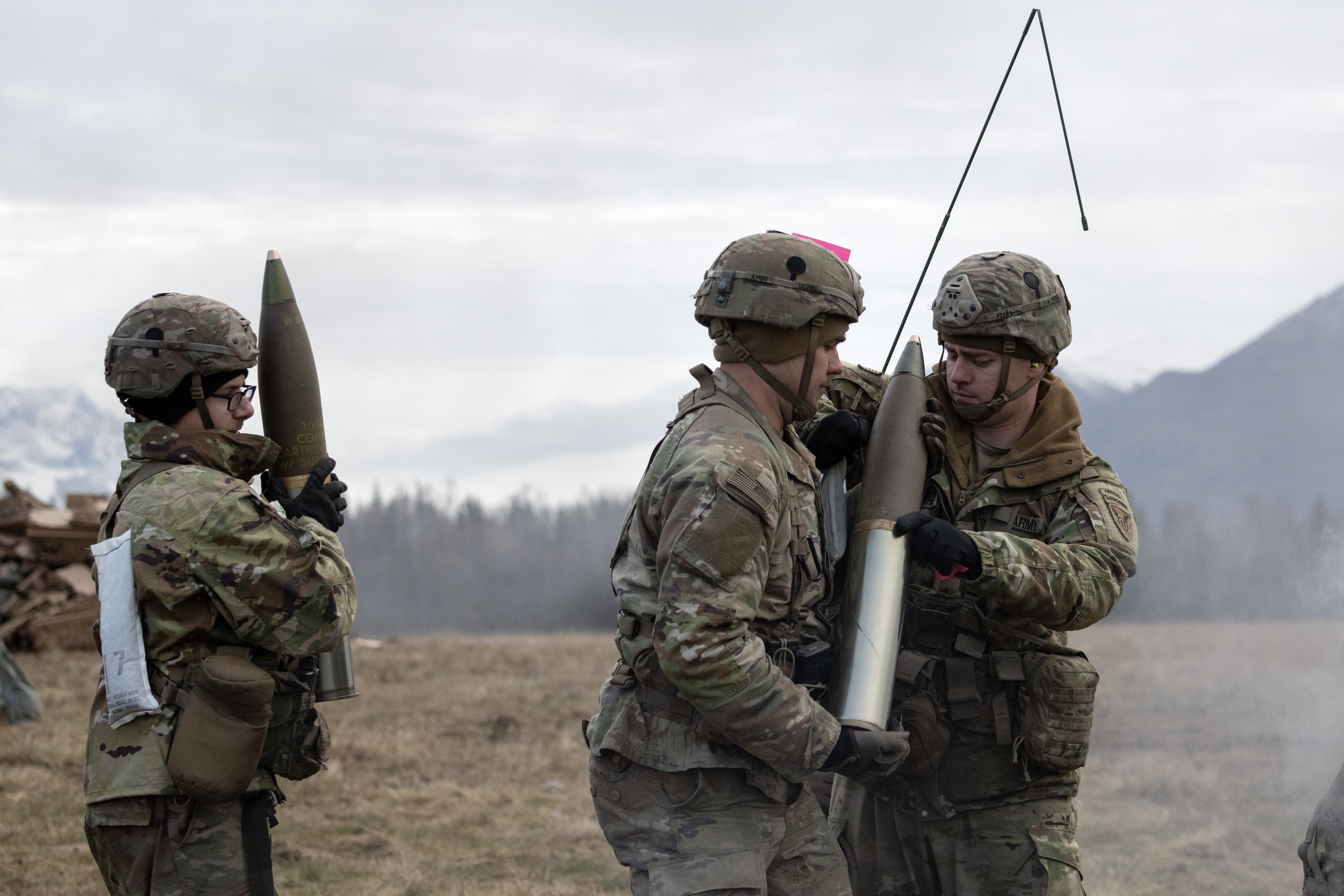
Soldiers from the 2-377TH FAR conduct expeditionary deployment operations during Arctic Aloha 24

- 1-377TH FAR: inactive since 23 October 2013
- 2-377TH FAR: active; assigned to 2nd BCT, 11th Airborne Division
- 3-377TH FAR: inactive since 1965
- Battery D, 377TH FAR: inactive
- Battery E, 377TH FAR: inactive

== Lineage and honors ==
=== Lineage ===
- Constituted 24 June 1921 in the Organized Reserves as the 377th Field Artillery and assigned to the 101st Division (later redesignated as the 101st Airborne Division)
- Organized in November 1921 with headquarters at Green Bay, Wisconsin
- Reorganized and redesignated 30 January 1942 as the 377th Field Artillery Battalion
- Redesignated 15 August 1942 as the 377th Parachute Field Artillery Battalion; concurrently, inactivated, withdrawn from the Organized Reserves, and allotted to the Army of the United States
- Activated 16 August 1942 at Camp Claiborne, Louisiana
- Inactivated 30 November 1945 in France
- Redesignated (less Battery D) 18 June 1948 as the 515th Airborne Field Artillery Battalion (Battery D concurrently converted and redesignated as the Support Company, 506th Airborne Infantry - hereafter separate lineage)
- Allotted 25 June 1948 to the Regular Army
- Activated 6 July 1948 at Camp Breckinridge, Kentucky
- Inactivated 15 April 1949 at Camp Breckinridge, Kentucky
- Activated 25 August 1950 at Camp Breckinridge, Kentucky
- Inactivated 1 December 1953 at Camp Breckinridge, Kentucky
- Activated 15 May 1954 at Fort Jackson, South Carolina
- Redesignated 1 July 1956 as the 377th Airborne Field Artillery Battalion
- Relieved 25 April 1957 from assignment to the 101st Airborne Division; concurrently, reorganized and redesignated as the 377th Artillery, a parent regiment under the Combat Arms Regimental System
- Redesignated 1 September 1971 as the 377th Field Artillery
- Withdrawn 15 January 1996 from the Combat Arms Regimental System and reorganized under the United States Army Regimental System
- Redesignated 1 October 2005 as the 377th Field Artillery Regiment

=== Campaign participation credit ===
- World War II: Normandy (with arrowhead); Rhineland (with arrowhead); Ardennes-Alsace; Central Europe
- Vietnam: Counteroffensive, Phase VI; Tet 69/Counteroffensive; Summer-Fall 1969; Winter-Spring 1970; Sanctuary Counteroffensive; Counteroffensive, Phase VII; Consolidation I; Consolidation II
- War on Terrorism: Campaigns to be determined
  - Afghanistan:
  - Iraq:

=== Decorations ===
- Presidential Unit Citation (Army), Streamer embroidered NORMANDY
- Presidential Unit Citation (Army), Streamer embroidered BASTOGNE
- Valorous Unit Award, Streamer embroidered KHOST PROVINCE 2009-2010
- Meritorious Unit Commendation (Army), Streamer embroidered IRAQ 2003
- Meritorious Unit Commendation (Army), Streamer embroidered IRAQ 2005-2006
- Meritorious Unit Commendation (Army), Streamer embroidered IRAQ 2009-2010
- French Croix de Guerre with Palm, World War II, Streamer embroidered NORMANDY
- Netherlands Orange Lanyard
- Belgian Fourragere 1940

Cited in the Order of the Day of the Belgian Army for action in France and Belgium

- Belgian Croix de Guerre 1940 with Palm, Streamer embroidered BASTOGNE; Cited in the order of the Day of the Belgian Army for action at Bastogne

== Heraldry ==
=== Distinctive unit insignia ===
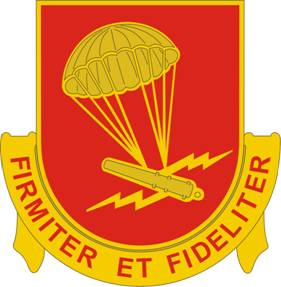

- Description: A Gold color metal and enamel device 1 1/8 inches (2.9 cm) in height overall consisting of a shield blazoned: Gules, an open parachute attached to a cannon flotant across a flash Or. Attached below and to the sides of the shield a Gold scroll inscribed "FIRMITER ET FIDELITER" in Red letters.
- Symbolism:The scarlet of the shield is for Field Artillery. The floating parachute with the cannon attached is symbolic of airborne functions of the organization. The motto: Firmiter et Fideliter (Steadfastly and Faithfully) is expressive of the characteristics of the personnel in performance of their duties.
- Background:The distinctive unit insignia was originally approved for the 377th Parachute Field Artillery Battalion on 14 November 1942. It was redesignated for the 515th Airborne Field Artillery Battalion on 26 September 1951. It was redesignated for the 377th Airborne Field Artillery Battalion on 31 July 1956. On 26 February 1958, the insignia was redesignated for the 377th Artillery Regiment. The insignia was redesignated for the 377th Field Artillery Regiment on 25 January 1972.

=== Coat of arms ===
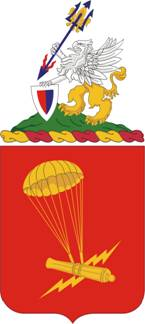

- Blazon
  - Shield: Gules, an open parachute attached to a cannon flotant across a flash Or.
  - Crest: On a wreath of the colors Or and Gules, on a mound Vert a griffin, the lower (lion) part of the first and the upper (eagle) part including wings Argent, holding in dexter talons a trident bendwise sinister Azure, the tines impaling a fleur-de-lis of the first, the shaft terminating in an arrowhead of the fifth inflamed Tenné and the sinister talons resting on the top of a shield per pale Gules and of the firth within a border of the fourth.
  - Motto: FIRMITER ET FIDELITER (Steadfastly and Faithfully).
- Symbolism
  - Shield: The scarlet of the shield is for Field Artillery. The floating parachute with the cannon attached is symbolic of airborne functions of the organization.
  - Crest: The griffin is a fabulous animal half eagle and half lion. The eagle alludes to the organization having served with the 101st Airborne (Screaming Eagle) Division in World War II and the lion to England, where it underwent training and from whence it "took off" for its air assault drops on Normandy and the Netherlands. The trident refers to "Operation Neptune" which launched the invasion of Normandy symbolized by the fleur-de-lis, an emblem of France, impaled on the tines, and alludes to the Normandy air drop. The arrowhead and orange flames (orange is the Netherlands' national color) refers to the air drop on the Netherlands. The red and blue shield, suggested by the coat of arms of Bastogne, refers to the gallant defense of Bastogne, and has been "surrounded by" a border in allusion to the town being surrounded by the enemy and is white to simulate snow, the action having taken place during winter. The green mound refers to the Rhineland campaign and Southern Germany.
  - Background: The coat of arms was originally approved for the 377th Parachute Field Artillery Battalion on 14 November 1942. It was redesignated for the 515th Airborne Field Artillery Battalion on 26 September 1951. It was redesignated for the 377th Airborne Field Artillery Battalion on 31 July 1956. On 26 February 1958, the insignia was redesignated for the 377th Artillery Regiment. It was amended to add a crest to the coat of arms on 16 November 1964. The insignia was redesignated for the 377th Field Artillery Regiment on 25 January 1972.

== See also ==
- Field Artillery Branch (United States)
- U.S. Army Coast Artillery Corps
