= Firebase Panther III =

Site information
- Type: Army

Location
- Coordinates: 16.318°N 107.63°E

Site history
- Built: 1968
- In use: 1968
- Battles/wars: Vietnam War

Firebase Panther III is a former United States Army firebase southwest of Huế, Thừa Thiên Province in central Vietnam.

== History ==
The base was established on the east bank of the Tả Trạch River 15 km south-southeast of Huế and 11 km southwest of Phu Bai Combat Base.

The base was established in August 1968 in support of Operation Nevada Eagle and occupied by the 2nd Battalion, 505th Infantry Regiment and 2nd Battalion, 321st Artillery Regiment. On the night of 29 August 1968 the base was hit by 180 rounds of 82mm mortar fire and then attacked by approximately 50 People's Army of Vietnam Sappers who penetrated the base killing eight U.S. soldiers. Ten Sappers were killed in the attack.

== Current use ==
The base has reverted to jungle.
