= 321st Brigade =

321st Brigade may refer to:

- 321st Brigade, Royal Field Artillery, United Kingdom
- 321st Civil Affairs Brigade, United States
- 321st Sustainment Brigade, United States

== See also ==
- 321st Regiment (disambiguation)
- 321st (disambiguation)
