= 1st Battalion, 321st Field Artillery Regiment =

Inactive US army unit

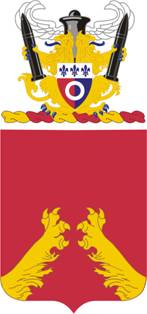
- Coat of arms
- Country: United States
- Branch: Army
- Type: Field artillery
- Size: Battalion
- Garrison/HQ: Inactive
- Motto: "Noli Me Tangere" (Don't Tread On Me)

Insignia
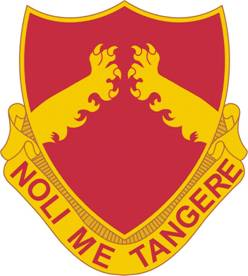
- Distinctive unit insignia

The 1st Battalion, 321st Field Artillery Regiment (1-321st FAR) is an inactive field artillery battalion of the United States Army. The battalion served in World War I, World War II, Vietnam and the global war on terror with the 82nd Airborne and 101st Airborne Divisions, and with the 18th Field Artillery Brigade. The battalion was officially inactivated in March 2014, and its firing batteries were distributed throughout the 82nd Airborne Division.

== History ==
=== World War I ===
1-321 FAR traces its lineage to Battery A, 321st Field Artillery, which organized on 2 September 1917 at Camp Gordon, Georgia. After training at Camp Gordon until May 1918, the battery shipped to France, and participated with the regiment in the St. Mihiel, Meuse Argonne and Lorraine 1918 campaigns. Following the Armistice, the battery redeployed to the United States and was demobilized at Camp Dix, New Jersey in May 1919.

=== Vietnam ===
==== 1968 ====
1st Battalion, 321st Artillery (1-321) deployed to Vietnam attached to the 2d Brigade, 101st Airborne Division from 12 – 17 December 1967. After 30 days of in-country training, during which the battalion undertook missions in support of the 2d Brigade, the battalion supported Operations Manchester, San Angelo and Atalla. From 10–11 January 1968, the battalion fired 1,935 rounds in support of a 25th Infantry Division fire support base, resulting in "a large number of enemy killed." During its first two months in Vietnam, the battalion fired 19,150 rounds.
The battalion began February 1968 near LZ El Paso near Phu Bai in the I Corps Tactical Zone, in direct support to 2d Brigade, which was under the Operational Control of the 1st Air Cavalry Division. On 9 February 1968, the battalion received FADAC computers, and selected personnel from the battalion received five days of FADAC training at the 1st Infantry Division Artillery at Phu Loi. After the termination of Operation Manchester on 18 February 1968, 1-321 supported 2d Brigade operations north of Huế, eventually occupying LZ Sally. On 9 March 1968, Battery C, 2-11 FA was attached to 1-321 for reinforcing 155mm fires. 2d Brigade and 1-321 terminated participation in Operation Jeb Stuart and returned to 101st Division control on 10 March. On 11 March 1968, 2d Brigade initiated Operation Carentan. On 18 March 1968 at 0400 hours, elements of Battery B repulsed an enemy ground attack against FSB Minky with direct and indirect fire, killing 30 NVA. On 28 April 1968, 2d Brigade surrounded a number of NVA companies, and 1-321 fired on the cordoned areas until 1 May 1968, resulting in 141 NVA killed and 95 prisoners when US forces entered the areas.

The 1-321 began May 1968 supporting 2d Brigade in Operation Carentan II, with batteries located at FSBs Mongoose, Omaha and Birmingham. On 5 May 1968, Battery C displaced by air from FSB Birmingham to FSB Omaha, replacing Battery B, which then moved to LZ Pinky. ON 15 May 1968, Battery A moved by road to FSB Mongoose to support 1-501 Infantry east of Huế. On 17 May 1968, Operation Carentan terminated and Operation Nevada Eagle began. On 4 July 1968, Battery A moved by road to Camp Eagle to fire a 50-gun salute and returned to FSB Mongoose. On 23 July 1968, Battery A moved by air from FSB Boyd to FSB Veghel, allowing Battery A, 2-320 to occupy FSB Son in support of operations in the A Shau Valley. During the quarter, the battalion transferred 70 soldiers (officers, section chiefs, FDC personnel and other specialists) to 2-320 FA, which had been deployed with 1st Brigade since 1965 to sustain Battery D, 2-320, a provisional battery created to support 1st Brigade's fourth maneuver battalion, 3-506 Infantry.

August 1968 began with 1-321 headquarters at FSB Sally, Battery A at FSB Mongoose, Battery B at FSB T-Bone and Battery C at FSB Georgia. The battalion was engaged in preparing for Operation Somerset Plain and Nevada Eagle. On 10 August 1968, Battery C fired counter-battery fire at enemy 130mm and 152mm positions that had engaged Company D, 1-327 Infantry. On 9–10 August 1968, Battery A fired into a cordon established by 1-501 Infantry to force the enemy onto the waiting infantry, resulting in 42 VC killed and 104 detainees. On 15 August 1968, the battalion massed fires with the ARVN battery at FSB Geronimo to counterfire against rockets fired at Huế. On 19 August 1968, LTC George E. Peters, the battalion commander, was wounded by enemy artillery that scored at direct hit on the 2d Brigade TOC at FSB Georgia. On 20 August, Battery C redeployed from FSB Georgia to FSB Omaha. From 4–8 September 1968, Battery A's positions were flooded, causing movement to FSB Shirley. Battery C remained at FSB Omaha, but repositioned to higher ground within the FSB. On 6 September 1968, LTC Don L. Walton assumed command of the battalion. On 10 September 1968, Battery C moved from FSB Omaha to FSB Sally. On 11 September 1968, Battery A conducted an air assault from FSB Shirley to FSB Binh Loc in support of a combined US-ARVN operation. On 13 September 1968, Battery B, 2-320 moved by air from FSB Panther II to FSB Anzio to reinforce the battalion's fires in support of the Vinh Loc operation. On 18 September 1968, Battery A, 2-319, returning to the 101st from operations with the 25th Infantry Division, closed at Camp Eagle and began reinforcing the battalion. On 24 September 1968, Battery A returned from FSB Vinh Loc to FSB Sandy as the combined operation terminated. On 15 October 1968, Battery B conducted an air assault from FSB T-Bone to FSB Tomahawk.

==== 1969 ====
At the beginning of August 1969, the battalion headquarters was at FSB Sally, with Battery A at FSB Sledge, Battery B at FSB Roy and Battery C at FSB Birmingham. On 1 August 1969, Battery C moved four howitzers from Camp Eagle to FSB Birmingham after firing a salute for General Smith at the change of command of the Division Artillery to COL Howard Moore. On 2 August 1969, Battery C moved four howitzers by road to FSB Bastogne, returning on 8 August 1969. On 11 August, Battery B moved by air to FSB Brick for an artillery raid named Operation CAISSON XIV. After firing 404 rounds at 58 targets, the battery moved by air to FSB Arrow. On 12 August, Batteries B and C participated in counterfire against rockets fired at Huế and Phu Bai. Battery C moved from FSB Birmingham to FSB Salley. On 13 August 1969, Battery A moved by air from FSB Sledge to FSB Rock Crusher, and then by road to Camp Evans (4 howitzers) and Camp Eagle (2 howitzers). The two howitzers at Camp Eagle rejoined the battery at Camp Evans on 14 August 1969. On 16 August 1969, Battery B fired counterfire against rockets launched against Camp Eagle, and moved three howitzers by road from FSB Arrow to FSB Bastogne. On 17 August 1969, Battery B conducted counterfire against rockets fired at Phu Bai. ON 20 August 1969, Battery B moved three howitzers from FSB Bastogne to FSB Arrow, and participated in counterfire against rockets fired at Phu Bai. On 25 August 1969, Battery B roadmarched to FSB Arsenal with the TPS-25 radar. On 26 August 1969, Battery C moved by air from LZ Sally to FSB Rakkasan. On 27 August 1969, Battery B participated in counterfire against rockets fired at Phu Bai. On 29 August 1969, Battery C moved by air to FSB O'Riley, and then on to LZ Sally on 3 September. On 4 September 1969, LZ Sally was attacked with RPGs and mortars- Battery C participated in countermortar fires with unknown results on the enemy. Also on 4 September, Battery A moved by air to FSB Anne. On 7 September, while moving from FSB Anne to Camp Evans, Battery lost two A22s when a foot strap broke. On 8 September 1969, Battery B moved three howitzers by road from FSB Arsenal to LZ Sally; Battery C moved three howitzers from LZ Sally to FSB Arsenal to replace the Battery B howitzers. On 10 September, the remaining three howitzers from Battery C moved by air from LZ Sally to FSB Arsenal, while the remaining three Battery B howitzers at FSB Arsenal moved to LZ Sally. On 23 September, Battery B moved by air from FSB Sally to FSB Bastogne, while Battery A moved from Camp Evans to FSB Sally. On 13 October 1969, Battery A moved by air to FSB Jack, returning to LZ Sally on 17 October 1969. On 21 October 1969, Battery A moved by air to FSB Rakkasan. On 25 October 1969, Battery C conducted Operation Caisson XXVI, an artillery raid to FSB Maureen. The battery fired 760 rounds at 47 targets, destroying 35 structures and one bunker, damaging four structures and causing two secondary explosions before moving to FSB Birmingham.

On 4 November 1969, Battery A returned from FSB Rakkasan to LZ Sally. On 8 November 1969, Battery B moved four howitzers by air to participate in a raid at FSB Zon with three howitzers from Battery B, 2-11 Arty. The combined unit fired 890 rounds at 80 targets in the central and northern A Shau Valley, resulting in the destruction of 15 bunkers and huts and causing six secondary explosions before returning by air to FSB Bastogne on 10 November 1969. On 22 November, four howitzers from Battery A, again accompanied by three howitzers from Battery B, 2-11 Arty, moved to FSB Bradley for another raid. The Battery A element fired 514 rounds against 65 targets before returning to LZ Sally. The raid destroyed 17 bunkers, six huts, three fighting positions and two bridges; caused two secondary fires; and interdicted five infiltration routes. On 29 November 1969, Battery C participated in counterfire against rockets fired at the city of Huế. On 3 December, Battery C fired 72 HE as part of a counterfire program against rockets fired at Camp Eagle. On 5 December, Battery A moved by air to FSB Normandy, remaining until 13 December 1969. On 8 January 1970, Battery A moved four howitzers by air to FSB Blaze. Battery A returned to LZ Sally on 10 January 1970 and moved again to FSB Strike on 12 January 1970 and remained there until 25 January before returning to LZ Sally.

=== Later Cold War ===
In October 1986, as part of redesignations to implement the U.S. Army Regimental System, 1-321 FAR was inactivated and relieved from assignment to the 101st Airborne Division.

=== Post Cold War ===
On 16 January 1996, as a part of a large number of reflaggings associated with the post-Cold War drawdown of the US Army, the battalion was reactivated by reflagging the 1st Battalion, 39th Field Artillery Regiment, the Army's only airborne 155mm howitzer battalion and a subordinate of the 18th Field Artillery Brigade at Fort Bragg, North Carolina.

=== Global war on terror ===
In October 2013, as part of the Army 2015 restructuring, the battalion's three batteries were split up among the three battalions of the 319th Field Artillery Regiment, which were simultaneously reorganized as "composite battalions" with a mix of 105mm and 155mm howitzers. Battery A, 1-321 was reflagged as Battery C, 3-319th AFAR; Battery B, 1-321 was reflagged as Battery C, 2-319th AFAR; and Battery C, 1-321 reflagged as Battery C, 1-319th AFAR. The battalion officially inactivated in a ceremony on 14 March 2014.

== Lineage and honors ==
=== Lineage ===
- Constituted 5 August 1917 in the National Army as Battery A, 321st Field Artillery, an element of the 82d Division
- Organized 2 September 1917 at Camp Gordon, Georgia
- Demobilized 26 May 1919 at Camp Dix, New Jersey
- Reconstituted 5 June 1930 in the Organized Reserves; concurrently, consolidated with Battery A, 321st Field Artillery (active) (constituted in July 1923 in the Organized Reserves as Battery A, 452d Field Artillery, and organized in Georgia; redesignated 5 October 1929 as Battery A, 321st Field Artillery, an element of the 82d Division), and consolidated unit designated as Battery A, 321st Field Artillery, an element of the 82d Division
- Reorganized and redesignated 13 February 1942 as Battery A, 321st Field Artillery Battalion
- Ordered into active military service 25 March 1942 and reorganized at Camp Claiborne, Louisiana
- Reorganized and redesignated 15 August 1942 as Battery A, 321st Glider Field Artillery Battalion, an element of the 101st Airborne Division
- Inactivated 30 November 1945 in Germany

(Organized Reserves redesignated 25 March 1948 as the Organized Reserve Corps)

- Redesignated 18 June 1948 as Battery A, 518th Airborne Field Artillery Battalion
- Withdrawn 25 June 1948 from the Organized Reserve Corps and allotted to the Regular Army
- Activated 6 July 1948 at Camp Breckinridge, Kentucky
- Inactivated 1 April 1949 at Camp Breckinridge, Kentucky
- Activated 25 August 1950 at Camp Breckinridge, Kentucky
- Inactivated 1 December 1953 at Camp Breckinridge, Kentucky
- Activated 15 May 1954 at Fort Jackson, South Carolina
- Redesignated 1 July 1956 as Battery A, 321st Airborne Field Artillery Battalion
- Reorganized and redesignated 25 April 1957 as Battery A, 321st Artillery, an element of the 101st Airborne Division
- Reorganized and redesignated 3 February 1964 as Headquarters, Headquarters and Service Battery, 1st Battalion, 321st Artillery (organic elements constituted 21 January 1964 and activated 3 February 1964)
- Redesignated 1 September 1971 as the 1st Battalion, 321st Field Artillery
- Inactivated 2 October 1986 at Fort Campbell, Kentucky, and relieved from assignment to the 101st Airborne Division
- Activated 16 January 1996 at Fort Bragg, North Carolina
- Redesignated 1 October 2005 as the 1st Battalion, 321st Field Artillery Regiment
- Inactivated 14 March 2014 at Fort Bragg, North Carolina

=== Campaign participation credit ===
- World War I: St. Mihiel; Meuse-Argonne; Lorraine 1918
- World War II: Normandy (with arrowhead); Rhineland (with arrowhead); Ardennes-Alsace; Central Europe
- Vietnam: Counteroffensive, Phase III; Tet Counteroffensive; Counteroffensive, Phase IV; Counteroffensive, Phase V; Counteroffensive, Phase VI; Tet 69/Counteroffensive; Summer-Fall 1969; Winter-Spring 1970; Sanctuary Counteroffensive; Counteroffensive, Phase VII; Consolidation I; Consolidation II
- War on Terrorism: Campaigns to be determined

=== Decorations ===
- Presidential Unit Citation (Army), Streamer embroidered BASTOGNE
- Meritorious Unit Commendation (Army) for AFGHANISTAN 2009-2010
- French Croix de Guerre with Palm, World War II, Streamer embroidered NORMANDY
- Netherlands Orange Lanyard
- Belgian Fourragere 1940
  - Cited in the Order of the Day of the Belgian Army for action in France and Belgium
- Belgian Croix de Guerre 1940 with Palm, Streamer embroidered BASTOGNE; cited in the Order of the Day of the Belgian Army for action at Bastogne
- Republic of Vietnam Cross of Gallantry with Palm, Streamer embroidered VIETNAM 1968
- Republic of Vietnam Cross of Gallantry with Palm, Streamer embroidered VIETNAM 1968-1969
- Republic of Vietnam Cross of Gallantry with Palm, Streamer embroidered VIETNAM 1971
- Republic of Vietnam Civil Action Honor Medal, First Class, Streamer embroidered VIETNAM 1968-1970

Battery B additionally entitled to:
- Meritorious Unit Commendation, Streamer embroidered IRAQ 2005-2006
Battery C additionally entitled to:
- Meritorious Unit Commendation, Streamer embroidered IRAQ 2005-2006
Battery D (provisional) additionally entitled to:
- Meritorious Unit Commendation, Streamer embroidered AFGHANISTAN 2010

Note: Separately cited awards are not listed by the official Army lineage and honors, last updated 2 October 2008.

== Heraldry ==
=== Distinctive unit insignia ===
321st Field Artillery Regiment Coat of Arms

=== Coat of arms ===
321st Field Artillery Regiment Distinctive Unit Insignia

== See also ==
- 321st Field Artillery Regiment
