= Operation Nevada Eagle =

Part of the Vietnam War (1968–1969)

- Part of the Vietnam War
| Date | 17 May 1968 – 28 February 1969 |
| Location | Thừa Thiên Province, South Vietnam |
| Result | US operational success |

Belligerents
| United States | North Vietnam |

Commanders and leaders
| Olinto M. Barsanti; Melvin Zais | |

Units involved
| 101st Airborne Division; 3rd Brigade, 82nd Airborne Division | |

Casualties and losses
| 175 killed | US body count: 3,299 killed 853 captured 3,379 individual and 322 crew-served weapons recovered |

Operation Nevada Eagle was a security operation during the Vietnam War in Thừa Thiên Province, that took place from 17 May 1968 to 28 February 1969.

== Background ==
The mission of Operation Nevada Eagle was to protect Huế and the surrounding districts. General Olinto M. Barsanti stationed the 2nd Brigade, 101st Airborne Division, in the lowlands to help South Vietnamese forces defend Revolutionary Development areas and to prevent the People's Army of Vietnam (PAVN) and Vietcong (VC) from acquiring rice during the summer harvest. The 1st Brigade, 101st Airborne Division and the 3rd Brigade, 82nd Airborne Division, operating in the foothills southwest of Huế, conducted spoiling attacks into Base Area 114 from the bases they had built along Route 547 in March and April. The division also exchanged mobile training teams with the Army of the Republic of Vietnam (ARVN) 1st Division.

== Operation ==
At 12:30 on 21 May, a PAVN battalion, augmented by personnel from a sapper demolition team, launched a ground attack against Camp Eagle, following a covering barrage of more than 400 rounds of 122mm rockets, 82mm mortars, B-40 and B-41 rocket propelled grenades (RPGs) into the Division headquarters area. The ground attack struck the southwest edge of the perimeter and was beaten back by headquarters troops of the 1st Brigade, members of the 2nd Battalion, 502nd Infantry Regiment and helicopter gunships. At dawn a sweep of the area revealed 54 PAVN dead and 16 weapons captured, also found were 40 satchel charges, 30 bangalore torpedoes, and 50 RPG rounds. Damage to the base area was light. Later on 21 May the 2nd Battalion, 327th Infantry Regiment repulsed a probe of their night defensive perimeter with artillery and small arms. 31 enemy dead and 12 weapons were found on the perimeter the next morning.

In late May the first of a series of weapons and equipment caches was unearthed deep in the triple canopy jungle west of Huế. The 1/327th Infantry uncovered three light artillery pieces, two anti-aircraft guns and one truck near Firebase Veghel. Three days later another cache was discovered 12 miles (19 km) southwest of Huế by the 2/327th Infantry, with more than 230 individual and crew-served weapons were pulled from storage bunkers dug into the jungle floor camouflaged with several feet of thick, overgrown brush. During the same period the 1/327th Infantry found and destroyed a fleet of 54 enemy trucks 3 miles (4.8 km) southwest of Firebase Veghel.

At 11:30 on 30 May Company B, 2nd Battalion, 502nd Infantry Regiment, while on a reconnaissance in force, engaged an estimated enemy platoon which was shortly reinforced by a company size unit. Company B 2/502nd Infantry called for airstrikes and the action continued until 13:53 resulting in 2 US killed and 3 PAVN killed. At 12:45 on 2 June Company A 2nd Battalion, 17th Cavalry Regiment, while on a reconnaissance in force received small-arms and rocket=propelled grenade fire from an estimated enemy company in bunkers. Three airstrikes were called on the enemy and Companies B and C, 2nd Battalion, 501st Infantry Regiment moved to reinforce Company A 2/17th Cavalry. The contact terminated at 16:50 with 2 US and 41 VC killed. At 07:30 on 16 June Company B, 2/327th Infantry, engaged an unknown number of enemy in bunkers. Artillery was directed upon the enemy. Results of the contact were 5 US killed and 27 PAVN killed and 21 captured. Cumulative results until the end of June were 87 US killed, 1021 PAVN/VC killed and 186 captured.

On the night of 29 August Firebase Panther III which was occupied by the 2nd Battalion, 505th Infantry Regiment and 2nd Battalion, 321st Artillery Regiment was hit by 180 rounds of 82mm mortar fire and then attacked by approximately 50 PAVN Sappers who penetrated the base killing eight U.S. soldiers. Ten Sappers were killed in the attack.

On its arrival in I Corps, the 1st Battalion, 506th Infantry Regiment had been assigned security missions and areas of operation southwest of Huế. On 8 October Company A, 1/506th found 40 decomposed enemy bodies in a stream bed at grid reference YD 764073 (16.33°N 107.587°E), they appeared to have been killed by artillery.

From 12 to 20 October 1/506th Infantry conducted combined operations with the Hac Bao reconnaissance company of the ARVN 1st Division in the "Salad Bowl" area at grid reference YD 718046 (16.3°N 107.543°E). During this operation they located seven weapons caches and a PAVN/VC base and hospital area. On 23 October the reconnaissance platoon of the 1/506th Infantry found another large weapons cache with 80 individual and one crew-served weapon. On 26 October Company A 1/506th Infantry discovered a base area and over 80 bodies that had been dead for 2–3 months. On 26 October the 3rd Brigade was ordered to move north to Camp Evans to take over from the 1st Cavalry Division which was moving south to III Corps in Operation Liberty Canyon.

On 1 December a unit of the 1st Brigade 101st Airborne, discovered the bodies of 15 enemy soldiers in graves while searching an area 6 miles (9.7 km) east southeast of Phú Lộc District.

At 19:30 on 2 February, Camp Eagle, the 101st Airborne headquarters located southeast of Huế, received 5 rounds of 122mm rockets. Aerial rocket artillery attacked the suspected firing location with unknown results.

On the afternoon of 27 February an element of the 2nd Brigade, 101st Airborne discovered a 4.5-ton munitions cache while searching a jungle area 15 miles (24 km) south of Huế. The cache contained 453 82mm mortar rounds, 264 60mm mortar rounds, 250lbs of TNT and 7,000 rounds of small arms ammunition.

== Aftermath ==
The operation terminated on 28 February 1969. US losses were 175 killed while PAVN losses were 3,299 killed and 853 captured. 3,379 individual weapons and 322 crew-served weapons were captured.
