= 1st Battalion, 377th Field Artillery Regiment =

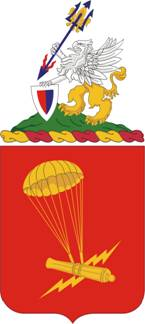
- 377th FAR Coat of arms
- Active: 1921-1942 (Organized Reserves); 1942-1945; 1948-1949; 1950-1953; 1954-1965; 1968-1986; 1996-2013
- Country: United States
- Branch: Army
- Type: field artillery
- Role: Airborne(inactive)
- Size: Battalion
- Motto(s): FIRMITER ET FIDELITER (Steadfastly and Faithfully)
- Engagements: World War II; Operation Enduring Freedom, Afghanistan; Operation Iraqi Freedom

Insignia
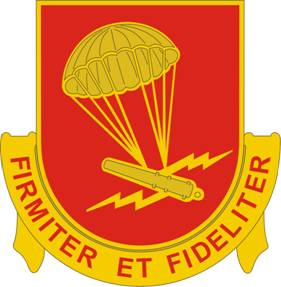
- Distinctive unit insignia

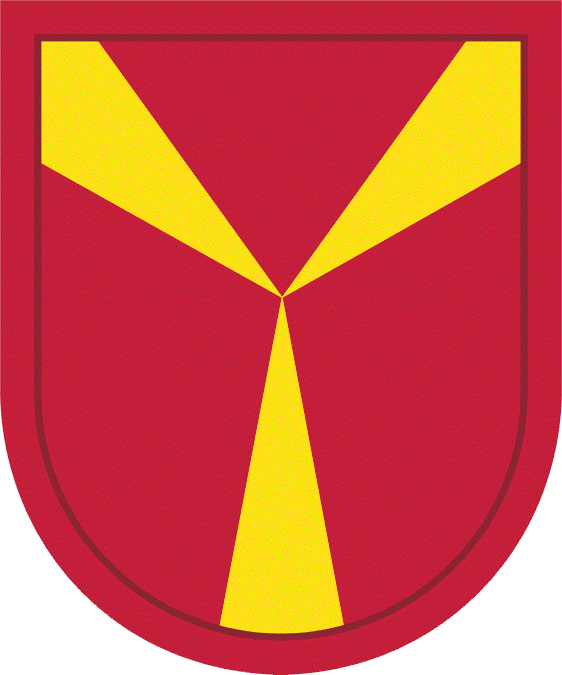
- Organizational beret flash

The 1st Battalion, 377th Field Artillery Regiment, is an inactive M198 howitzer/M777 howitzer 155mm field artillery battalion of the United States Army. The battalion has seen service with the 101st Airborne Division during World War II and the Vietnam War, and deployed to Iraq and Afghanistan during the Global War on Terrorism. The battalion has been stationed with the 101st Airborne Division at Fort Campbell; with the 18th Field Artillery Brigade and the 82nd Airborne Division at Fort Bragg, North Carolina; and with the 17th Field Artillery Brigade at Fort Lewis, Washington.

== History ==
=== World War II ===
Battery A, 377th Field Artillery Regiment was constituted in the Organized Reserves at Oshkosh, Wisconsin in 1921. The battery was activated as Battery A, 377th Parachute Field Artillery Battalion on 16 August 1942, as part of the 101st Airborne Division. After initial training, the battery sailed to England, arriving in Liverpool on 18 October 1943. Based at Benham Valence, Berkshire, England, the battalion conducted additional training in preparation for Operation Overlord.

Battery A parachuted into Normandy on 6 June 1944. Most of the battery initially fought as infantrymen due to the loss of their howitzers. On 7 June 1944, 33 artillerymen from the battery, under the command of Lt Thomas Swirczynski captured 130 Germans near Hau-des-dunes. Other artillerymen from the battery served with other artillery units, manning salvaged US pieces and even captured German howitzers. By 14 June 1944, the battery was consolidated and re-armed with new howitzers landed over the Normandy beaches.

The battery conducted a second parachute assault on 19 September 1944. After landing and firing in support of the 1/506th PIR and 502nd PIR, the battery occupied near St Oedenrode, supporting the 501st PIR and 502nd PIR. In late November, the battery was moved to Camp Mourmelon, France, for refit.

== Lineage and honors ==
=== Lineage ===
- Constituted 24 June 1921 in the Organized Reserves as Battery A, 377th Field Artillery, an element of the 101st Division (later redesignated as the 101st Airborne Division)
- Organized in November 1921 at Green Bay, Wisconsin
- Reorganized and redesignated 20 January 1942 as Battery A, 377th Field Artillery Battalion
- Redesignated 15 August 1942 as Battery A, 377th Parachute Field Artillery Battalion, concurrently inactivated, withdrawn from the Organized Reserves, and allotted to the Army of the United States
- Activated 16 August 1942 at Camp Claiborne, Louisiana
- Inactivated 20 November 1945 in France
- Redesignated 18 June 1948 as Battery A, 515th Airborne Field Artillery Battalion
- Allotted 25 Jun 1948 to the Regular Army
- Activated 6 July 1948 at Camp Breckinridge, Kentucky
- Inactivated 15 April 1949 at Camp Breckinridge, Kentucky
- Activated 25 August 1950 at Camp Breckinridge, Kentucky
- Inactivated 1 December 1953 at Camp Breckinridge, Kentucky
- Activated 15 May 1954 at Fort Jackson, South Carolina
- Redesignated 1 July 1956 as Battery A, 377th Airborne Field Artillery Battalion
- Reorganized and redesignated 25 April 1957 at Battery A, 377th Artillery, an element of the 101st Airborne Division
- Inactivated 21 May 1965 at Fort Campbell, Kentucky
- Activated 20 December 1968 in Vietnam
- Redesignated 1 September 1971 as Battery A, 377th Field Artillery
- Inactivated 15 June 1986 at Fort Campbell, Kentucky, and relieved from assignment to the 101st Airborne Division
- Redesignated 16 May 1996 as Headquarters and Headquarters Battery, 1st Battalion, 377th Field Artillery, and activated at Fort Bragg, North Carolina (organic elements concurrently constituted and activated)
- Redesignated 1 October 2005 as the 1st Battalion, 377th Field Artillery Regiment

=== Campaign participation credit ===
- World War II: Normandy (with arrowhead); Rhineland (with arrowhead); Ardennes-Alsace; Central Europe
- Vietnam: Counteroffensive, Phase VI; Tet 69/Counteroffensive; Summer-Fall 1969; Winter-Spring 1970; Sanctuary Counteroffensive; Counteroffensive, Phase VII; Consolidation I; Consolidation II
- War on Terrorism: Campaigns to be determined

=== Decorations ===
- Presidential Unit Citation (Army), Streamer embroidered NORMANDY
- Presidential Unit Citation (Army), Streamer embroidered BASTOGNE
- Meritorious Unit Commendation (Army), Streamer embroidered IRAQ 2003
- Meritorious Unit Commendation (Army), Streamer embroidered IRAQ 2005–2006
- French Croix de Guerre with Palm, World War II, Streamer embroidered NORMANDY
- Belgian Fourragere 1940
- Cited in the Order of the Day of the Belgian Army for action in FRANCE AND BELGIUM
- Belgian Croix de Guerre 1940 with Palm, Streamer embroidered BASTOGNE; cited in the Order of the Day of the Belgian Army for action at BASTOGNE
- Republic of Vietnam Cross of Gallantry with Palm, Streamer embroidered VIETNAM 1968–1969
- Republic of Vietnam Cross of Gallantry with Palm, Streamer embroidered VIETNAM 1971
- Republic of Vietnam Civil Action Honor Medal, First Class, Streamer embroidered VIETNAM 1968-1970
- C Battery 1-377 additionally entitled to Meritorious Unit Commendation (ARMY), Streamer embroidered AFGHANISTAN 2010-2011 GO 2014-64 : 4/25 25ID

== Heraldry ==
=== Distinctive unit insignia ===
377th Field Artillery Regiment#Distinctive Unit Insignia

=== Coat of arms ===
377th Field Artillery Regiment#Coat of Arms

=== Beret Flash ===
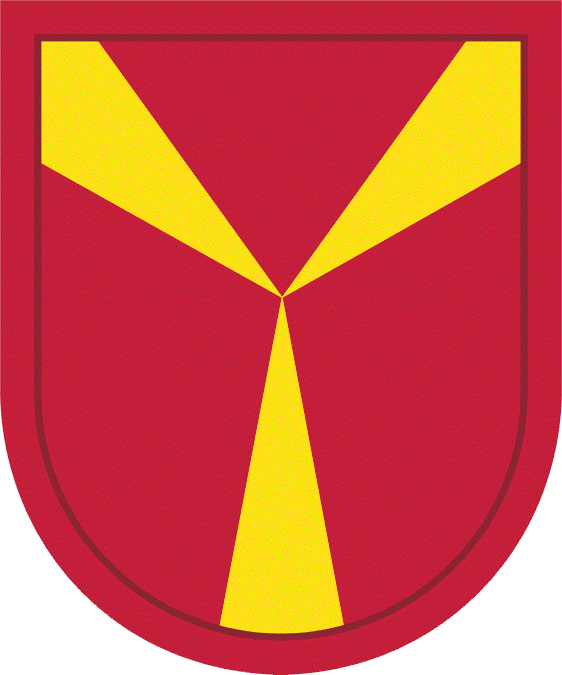

On a scarlet shield shaped embroidered device with a semi-circular base, 2 1/4 inches (5.72 cm) in height and 1 7/8 inches (4.76 cm) in width edged with a 1/8 inch (.32 cm) scarlet border, three yellow pie sections radiating from the center configuring a "Y" and ending at the overedge stitching. The beret flash was approved on 9 Aug 2000.
