= 321st Cavalry Regiment =

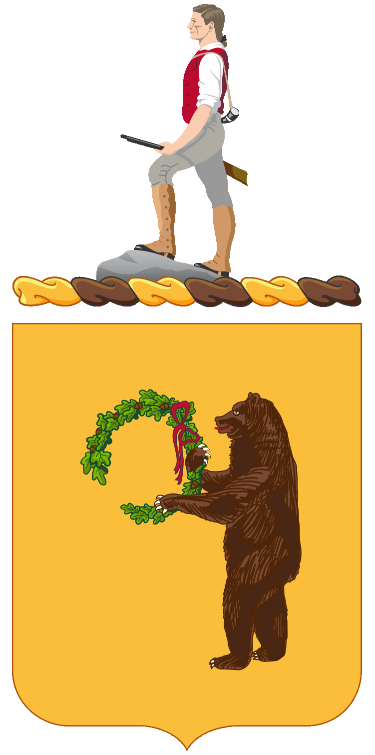
- Coat of Arms of the 321st Cavalry Regiment
- Active: 1922–1942
- Country: United States
- Branch: United States Army
- Type: Cavalry
- Part of: 66th Cavalry Division (1921–1942)
- Garrison/HQ: St. Louis (1936–1941)
- Motto: "Tiens ta Foi" (Hold thy Faith)

Insignia
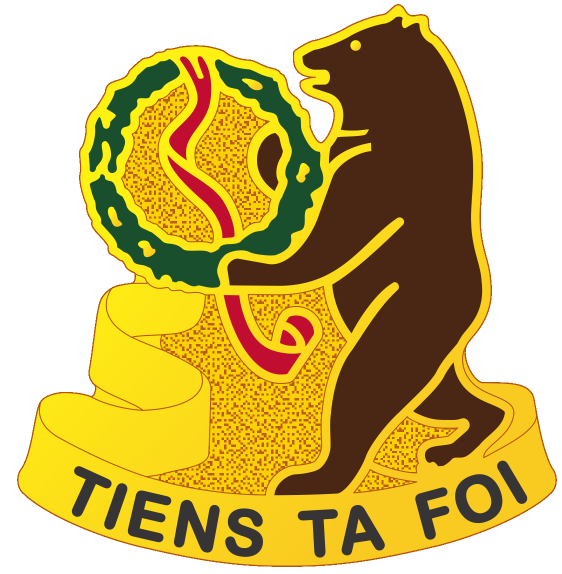
- Distinctive Unit Insignia

The 321st Cavalry Regiment was a cavalry unit of the United States Army during the interwar period. The unit was activated as a Missouri and Arkansas Organized Reserve unit during the interwar period. It was converted into a signal aircraft warning regiment after the United States entered World War II.

== History ==
The regiment was constituted on 15 October 1921 in the Organized Reserves, part of the 66th Cavalry Division's 161st Cavalry Brigade in the Seventh Corps Area. It was initiated (activated) in January 1922 with headquarters at Kansas City, 1st Squadron at St. Louis, and 2nd Squadron at Little Rock. On 26 May 1926, the 1st Squadron moved to Sedalia, while the 2nd Squadron moved to St. Joseph. In July 1929, the regiment added a 3rd Squadron at St. Louis, with the 1st Squadron simultaneously moving to Kansas City. On 10 December 1931, the regiment's Arkansas elements were inactivated and the entire regiment relocated to Kansas City. Around 24 April 1936, the regimental headquarters moved to St. Louis.

From 1922 to 1936, the regiment's Kansas City elements usually held their inactive training period meetings at the 110th Engineer Regiment Armory or the Organized Reserve Center building at 20th and Vine Streets in Kansas City. The 321st conducted regular equestrian training on the horses of the Regular Army units at Fort Leavenworth. It conducted summer training at Fort Des Moines with the 14th Cavalry Regiment, and the 2nd Cavalry Regiment at Fort Riley. As an alternate form of training, the regiment provided cavalry training to civilians under the Citizens' Military Training Camp program at Fort Des Moines. Its designated mobilization training station was Fort Francis E. Warren, Wyoming.

After the United States entered World War II, the regiment was converted into the 547th Signal Aircraft Warning Regiment on 30 January 1942. The regiment was disbanded on 11 November 1944. An unrelated 321st Armored Cavalry Regiment briefly existed postwar in Virginia as a reserve unit.

== Commanders ==
The 321st was commanded by the following officers:

- Lieutenant Colonel Francis D. Ross (January 1922–9 September 1925)
- Colonel Edward S. Person (9 September 1925–November 1928)
- Colonel James E. McMahon (December 1930–14 December 1937)

== Heraldry ==
The regimental coat of arms was approved on 10 November 1924 and its distinctive unit insignia was approved on 8 January 1925. The distinctive unit insignia consisted of a standing grizzly bear holding a garland of oak leaves and acorns tied with a ribbon in his paws over a gold background. The regimental motto, "Tiens ta Foi" (Hold thy Faith) was attached on a ribbon scroll below the insignia. The yellow represented cavalry, the bear was from the Seal of Missouri, and the wreath from the Seal of Arkansas, the two state to which the 321st was allocated. The coat of arms was of a similar design except that it omitted the motto and included the Organized Reserve Minuteman crest above the shield.
