= 321st Armored Cavalry Regiment =

- Active: 1949–1950
- Country: United States
- Branch: United States Army
- Type: Cavalry
- Role: Reconnaissance
- Garrison/HQ: Lynchburg

The 321st Armored Cavalry Regiment (321st ACR) was a Virginia-based reconnaissance unit of the United States Army Organized Reserve Corps, which briefly existed after World War II. It was constituted in 1948, partially organized from existing units in 1949, and disbanded in 1952.

== History ==
The 321st Armored Cavalry was constituted on 26 November 1948 in the Organized Reserve Corps, and partially organized on 29 March 1949 from existing units. The 1st Battalion was redesignated from the 317th Mechanized Cavalry Reconnaissance Squadron, constituted on 8 November 1946 in the Organized Reserves and activated on 19 November at Lynchburg. Its Assault Gun Company was based at Danville. In mid-November 1949, the assault gun company absorbed the men of a battery of the 780th Field Artillery Battalion. On 30 October 1950, the 1st Battalion was redesignated as the 333rd Tank Battalion. The 321st ACR was disbanded on 10 March 1952. The 321st ACR did not inherit the lineage of the prewar 321st Cavalry Regiment, and was not authorized a coat of arms or distinctive unit insignia.
