= 321st Missile Wing LGM-30 Minuteman Missile Launch Sites =

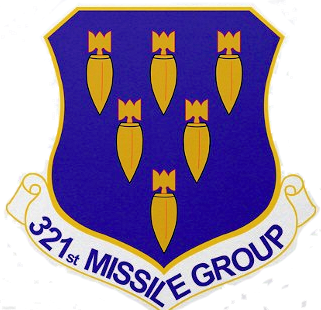
Emblem of the 321st Missile Group (1994-1998)

This is a list of the LGM-30 Minuteman missile Missile Alert Facilities and Launch Facilities of the 321st Missile Wing, 20th Air Force, assigned to Grand Forks AFB, North Dakota.

== Overview ==
The 321st Strategic Missile Wing was the sixth, and last United States Air Force LGM-30 Minuteman ICBM wing. In 1962, the Air Force announced that the Grand Forks AFB would be first to deploy the new LGM-30F Minuteman II missile (The previous deployments were all Minuteman I). Sylvania won the contract to build all the Launch Control centers and the launcher sites. Flooding during the winter and spring of 1964 and 1965 proved to be a serious issue with the missile silos under construction, as many flooded components, such as diesel generators, had to be returned to the factory for rehabilitation. The Launch Control Centers were built by Sylvania, rather than Boeing which constructed the facilities at the other Minuteman bases and were much larger and had a different underground design. Also, the site designation system at Grand Forks was different with each Flight LCC or MAF ending in zero rather than one as in the other 5 Minuteman Wings. In addition, the Grand Forks launch facilities had a hardened Launcher Equipment Building as opposed to the earlier five Minuteman wings that had softer Launcher Support Buildings. The Sylvania Minuteman system of the 321st Missile Wing at Grand Forks AFB as well as the Odd Squad 564th Strategic Missile Squadron at Malmstrom AFB utilized a double or redundant Deuce communication system with the Hardened Intersite Cable System or HICS backed up with radio capability for command and control of the missiles.

On 1 November 1964, the 321st SMW was activated by Strategic Air Command. As personnel began to report to the 321st, the wing trained for the day when the Minuteman II missile would be placed on alert status. In August 1965, the 321st received its first Minuteman II missile, shipped by train from assembly plant 77 at Hill AFB, Utah. During the following March, the base received the first Minuteman II to be shipped via aircraft, an Air Force first. On 26 April 1966, the 447th Strategic Missile Squadron and its 50 Minuteman II missiles were declared operational. Additional flights came on line throughout 1966. On 7 December the 321st Strategic Missile Wing, with its component 446th, 447th, and 448th Strategic Missile Squadrons, became fully operational.

From December 1971 to March 1973, the 321st converted to LGM-30G Minuteman III missiles. These missiles represented a significant technological advancement, having multiple independently targetable reentry vehicles (MIRVs).

With the restructuring of the Air Force after the end of the Cold War in the early 1990s the 321st first came under Air Combat Command and then Air Force Space Command jurisdiction. In March 1995, the Base Realignment and Closure Commission (BRAC) selected the 321st Missile Wing for inactivation. Initially downgraded to a Group in July 1994, the 321st was inactivated, with its three component missile squadrons on 30 September 1998. The 446th Strategic Missile Squadron completed its mission of mission transfer first in JUNE of 1996, followed by the 448th Strategic Missile Squadron in September 1997 and lastly the 447th Strategic Missile Squadron in September 1998.

The last alert pulled at each Launch Control Center and the last time a warhead or missile was pulled from its silo according to pictures taken of art work / wall murals at each facility.

446th Strategic Missile Squadron.

Alpha-Zero:

A-1: 16 April 1996 reentry vehicle removed, 17 April 1996 missile pulled.

A-2: 19 Dec 1995 reentry vehicle removed, 20 Dec 1995 missile pulled.

A-3: 2 April 1996 reentry vehicle removed, 3 April 1996 missile pulled.

A-4: 3 October 1995 reentry vehicle removed, 4 October 1995 missile pulled.

A-5: 3 January 1996 missile pulled.

A-6: 14 May 1996 reentry vehicle removed, 15 May 1996 missile pulled.

A-7: 15 July 1996 reentry vehicle removed, 16 July 1996 missile pulled.

A-8: 22 March 1996 reentry vehicle removed, 23 March 1996 missile pulled.

A-9: 5 March 1996 reentry vehicle removed, 6 March 1996 missile pulled.

A-10: 24 June 1996 Reentry vehicle removed, 9 July 1996 missile pulled.

Bravo-Zero: 1996.

Charlie-Zero: Squadron Command Post. July 1996.

Delta-Zero: 1996. Decertified last alert 2115Z

Echo-Zero: 15 May 1996.

447th Strategic Missile Squadron.

Foxtrot-Zero: 16–17 December 1997. 11,560 continuous 24 hour alerts.

Golf-Zero: 1349Z 5 June 1998. Shutdown complete

Hotel-Zero: 9 June 1998 9:35 CST or 1435Z. Decertified

India-Zero: 8 June 1998. Squadron Command Post

Juliett-Zero: 12 December 1997.

448th Strategic Missile Squadron.

Kilo-Zero: on or before 19 September 1997

Lima-Zero: 17 September 1997.

Mike-Zero: 19 September 1997. Alternate Command Post

M-21: 4 June 1997 reentry vehicle removed, 5 June 1997 missile pulled.

M-22: 21 Aug 1996 reentry vehicle removed, 22 Aug missile pulled.

M-23:

M-24:

M-25:

M-26:

M-27:

M-28:

M-29:

M-30:

November-Zero: 15 September 1997. Returned Classified and lights out.

N-31: 31 July 1996 reentry vehicle removed, 1 Aug 1996 missile pulled.

N-32: 6 Aug 1996 reentry vehicle removed, 7 Aug 1996 missile pulled.

N-33: 13 Aug 1997 missile and reentry vehicle pulled.

Oscar-Zero: 17 July 1997 13:15 CST.

Destruction of silos and control facilities began in October 1999 with (Alpha-04) being imploded on 6 October. The last silo (Hotel-22) was imploded on 24 August 2001, being the last US silo destroyed per the 1991 START I treaty. Sites (Oscar-Zero) and (November-33) were preserved by the North Dakota State Historical Society as the Ronald Reagan Minuteman Missile Site.

== Facilities ==
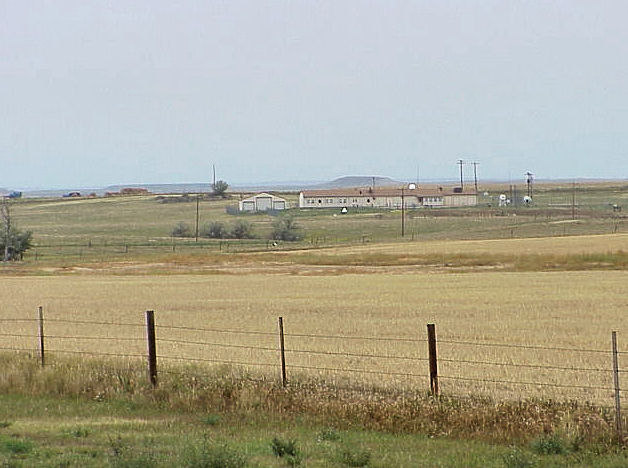
Missile Alert Facility

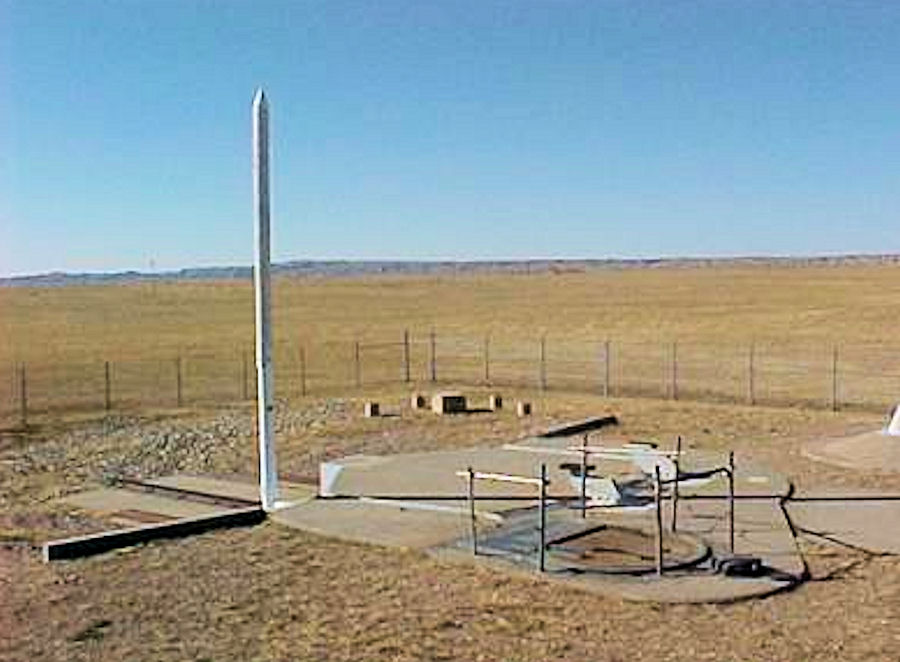
Minuteman III Launch Facility

The Missile Alert Facility (MAF) consists of a buried and hardened Launch Control Facility (LCC) and Launch Control Equipment Building (LCEB). MAFs were formerly known as Launch Control Facilities (LCFs) but terminology was changed in 1992 with the inactivation of Strategic Air Command (SAC). In addition, a MAF has a landing pad for helicopters; a large radio tower; a large "top hat" HF antenna; a vehicle garage for security vehicles; recreational facilities, and one or two sewage lagoons. The entire site, except for the helicopter pad and sewage lagoons are secured with a fence and security personnel. About a dozen airmen and officers are assigned to a MAF.

The underground LCC Launch Control Center (LCC) contains the command and control equipment for missile operations. It is staffed by the two launch officers who have primary control and responsibility for the 10 underground and hardened Launch Facilities (LF)s within its flight which contains the operational missile. Each of the five LCCs also has the ability to command and monitor all 50 LFs within the squadron. The LF is unmanned, except when maintenance and security personnel are needed.

A squadron is composed of five flights; flights are denoted by a letter of the alphabet with the facilities controlled by the flight being designated by a number. The first site in each flight is #00 and designates the Missile Alert Facility. The Launch Facilities (LFs, i.e. missile silos) are numbered 01 through 10, 11 through 20, and so on up to 50.

== Units and locations ==
=== 446th Missile Squadron ===
Activated by Strategic Air Command on 1 November 1963. Organized on 1 July 1965. Inactivated on 30 September 1998

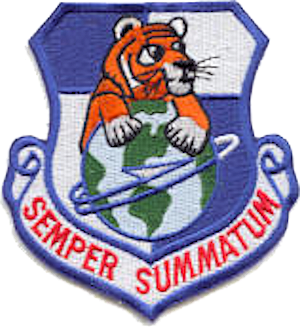
Emblem of the 446th Missile Squadron

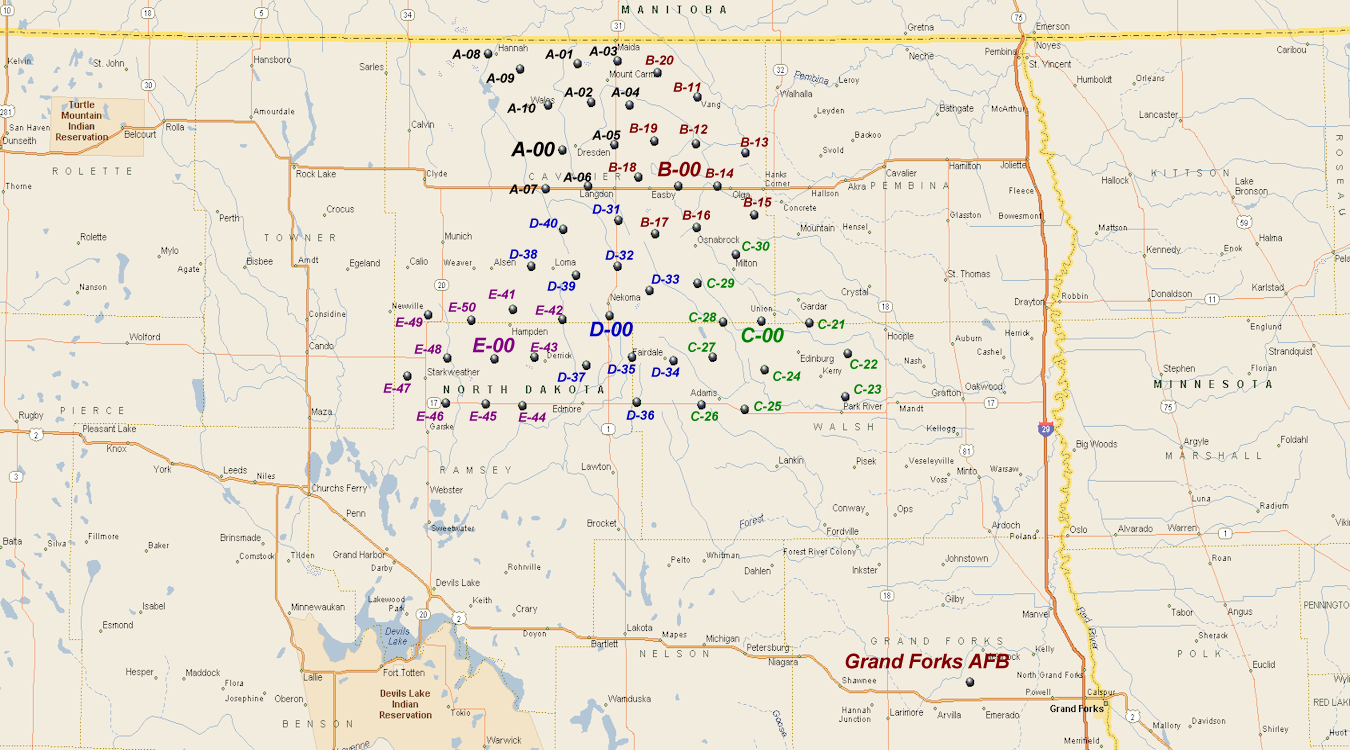
446th Missile Squadron - Missile Alert Facilities and Launch Facilities

- A-0 (MAF) 6.7 mi SE of Wales ND; 78.9 mi NW of Grand Forks AFB
  48°49′17″N 098°30′48″W

A-01 7.5 mi NE of Wales ND, 48°57′39″N 098°28′16″W
A-02 7.8 mi E of Wales ND, 48°53′56″N 098°26′02″W
A-03 12.1 mi ExNE of Wales ND, 48°57′58″N 098°21′42″W
A-04 12.6 mi E of Wales ND, 48°53′38″N 098°19′39″W
A-05 11.7 mi ExSE of Wales ND, 48°49′49″N 098°22′05″W
A-06 11.8 mi SE of Wales ND, 48°45′48″N 098°26′30″W
A-07 9.7 mi SxSE of Wales ND, 48°45′33″N 098°33′26″W
A-08 7.6 mi NW of Wales ND, 48°58′36″N 098°43′10″W
A-09 4.0 mi NxNW of Wales ND, 48°57′06″N 098°36′56″W
A-10 2.4 mi E of Wales ND, 48°53′38″N 098°33′06″W

- B-0 (MAF) 6.8 mi NxNW of Osnabrock ND; 66.8 mi NxNW of Grand Forks AFB
  48°45′49″N 098°11′36″W

B-11 16.5 mi N of Osnabrock ND, 48°54′28″N 098°08′20″W
B-12 11.2 mi N of Osnabrock ND, 48°49′53″N 098°08′35″W
B-13 12.1 mi NxNE of Osnabrock ND, 48°49′01″N 098°00′25″W
B-14 7.1 mi NxNE of Osnabrock ND, 48°45′47″N 098°05′08″W
B-15 8.5 mi ExNE of Osnabrock ND, 48°43′38″N 097°58′58″W
B-16 1.9 mi N of Osnabrock ND, 48°41′49″N 098°08′28″W
B-17 5.1 mi WxNW of Osnabrock ND, 48°41′11″N 098°15′24″W
B-18 10.3 mi NW of Osnabrock ND, 48°46′39″N 098°18′09″W
B-19 12.5 mi NxNW of Osnabrock ND, 48°50′09″N 098°15′31″W
B-20 19.7 mi NxNW of Osnabrock ND, 48°56′49″N 098°15′04″W

- C-0 (MAF) 5.7 mi NW of Edinburg ND; 48.4 mi NxNW of Grand Forks AFB
  48°32′43″N 097°57′50″W

C-21 3.8 mi NxNE of Edinburg ND, 48°32′43″N 097°49′59″W
C-22 6.3 mi E of Edinburg ND, 48°29′31″N 097°43′43″W
C-23 7.8 mi SE of Edinburg ND, 48°25′24″N 097°44′05″W
C-24 4.6 mi WxSW of Edinburg ND, 48°28′01″N 097°57′25″W
C-25 9.2 mi SW of Edinburg ND, 48°24′14″N 098°00′38″W
C-26 13.5 mi WxSW of Edinburg ND, 48°24′38″N 098°07′46″W
C-27 10.7 mi W of Edinburg ND, 48°29′15″N 098°05′51″W
C-28 10.1 mi ExSE of Edinburg ND, 48°32′44″N 098°04′16″W
C-29 14.8 mi ExSE of Edinburg ND, 48°36′24″N 098°08′26″W
C-30 13.4 mi SE of Edinburg ND, 48°39′14″N 098°02′00″W

- D-0 (MAF) 1.7 mi SxSW of Nekoma ND; 61.5 mi NW of Grand Forks AFB
  48°33′14″N 098°22′50″W

D-31 9.1 mi N of Nekoma ND, 48°42′31″N 098°21′30″W
D-32 4.0 mi N of Nekoma ND, 48°38′05″N 098°21′31″W
D-33 4.7 mi ExNE of Nekoma ND, 48°35′45″N 098°16′18″W
D-34 10.1 mi SE of Nekoma ND, 48°28′57″N 098°12′22″W
D-35 6.7 mi SxSE of Nekoma ND, 48°29′16″N 098°19′15″W
D-36 11.7 mi SxSE of Nekoma ND, 48°24′54″N 098°18′21″W
D-37 7.9 mi SxSW of Nekoma ND, 48°28′29″N 098°26′43″W
D-38 11.0 mi WxNW of Nekoma ND, 48°37′59″N 098°35′50″W
D-39 5.5 mi WxNW of Nekoma ND, 48°37′08″N 098°28′24″W
D-40 10.2 mi NW of Nekoma ND, 48°41′36″N 098°30′37″W

- E-0 (MAF) 4.3 mi SxSW of Hampden ND; 70.4 mi WxNW of Grand Forks AFB
  48°29′01″N 098°41′46″W

E-41 1.7 mi NxNE of Hampden ND, 48°33′48″N 098°38′51″W
E-42 6.8 mi E of Hampden ND, 48°32′56″N 098°30′36″W
E-43 4.8 mi SE of Hampden ND, 48°29′16″N 098°35′15″W
E-44 9.2 mi S of Hampden ND, 48°24′32″N 098°37′11″W
E-45 9.3 mi SxSW of Hampden ND, 48°24′40″N 098°43′15″W
E-46 11.8 mi SW of Hampden ND, 48°24′42″N 098°49′45″W
E-47 14.0 mi WxSW of Hampden ND, 48°27′18″N 098°56′07″W
E-48 8.6 mi WxSW of Hampden ND, 48°29′02″N 098°49′37″W
E-49 10.2 mi E of Hampden ND, 48°33′13″N 098°52′45″W
E-50 4.7 mi E of Hampden ND, 48°32′45″N 098°45′38″W

=== 447th Missile Squadron ===
Activated by Strategic Air Command on 1 November 1963. Organized on 1 February 1965. Inactivated on 30 September 1998

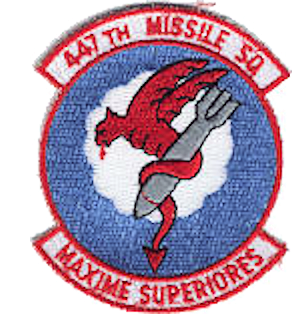
Emblem of the 447th Missile Squadron

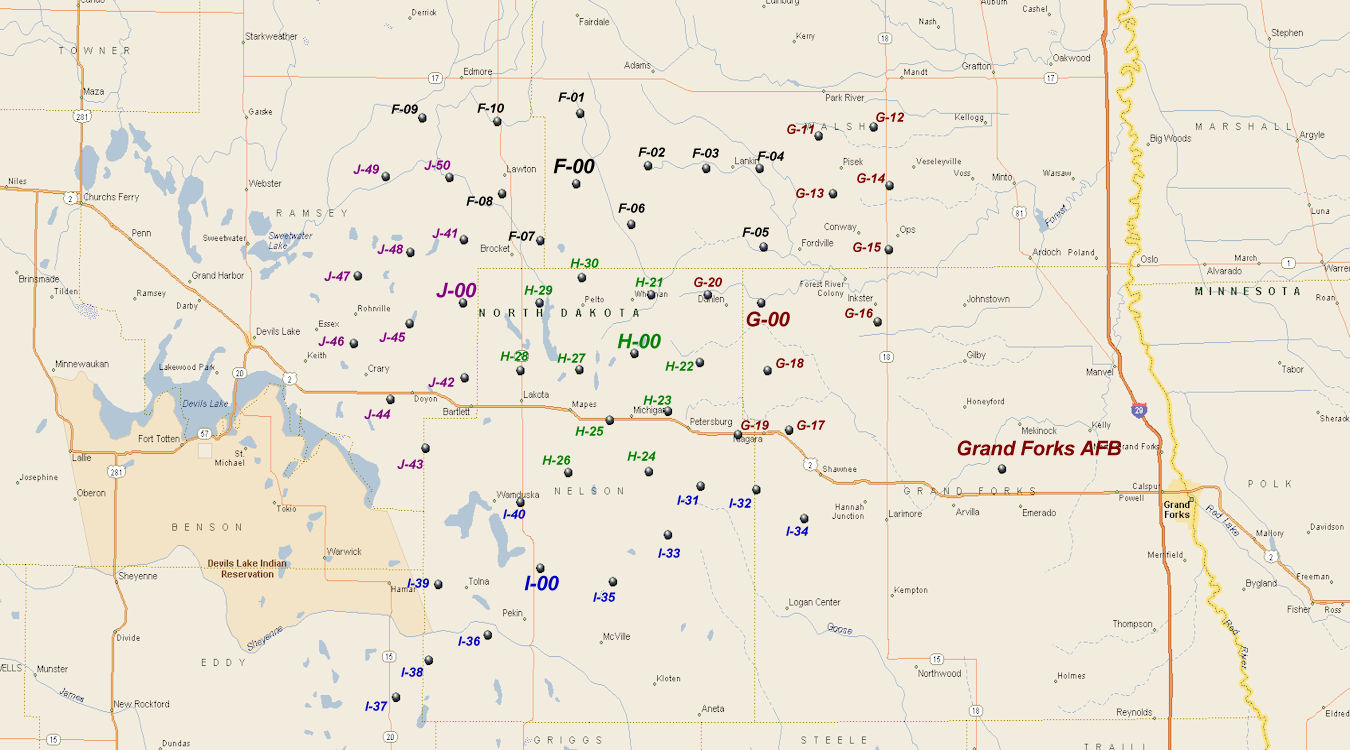
447th Missile Squadron - Missile Alert Facilities and Launch Facilities

- F-0 (MAF) 6.3 mi E of Lawton ND; 45.2 mi WxNW of Grand Forks AFB
  48°17′27″N 098°13′52″W

F-01 8.2 mi NE of Lawton ND, 48°22′19″N 098°13′24″W
F-02 12.8 mi E of Lawton ND, 48°18′45″N 098°05′23″W
F-03 17.7 mi E of Lawton ND, 48°18′31″N 097°58′54″W
F-04 22.8 mi W of Lawton ND, 48°18′31″N 097°52′16″W
F-05 23.8 mi WxNW of Lawton ND, 48°13′08″N 097°51′50″W
F-06 11.9 mi ExSE of Lawton ND, 48°14′39″N 098°07′23″W
F-07 6.0 mi SxSE of Lawton ND, 48°13′34″N 098°18′02″W
F-08 1.6 mi SxSW of Lawton ND, 48°16′46″N 098°22′33″W
F-09 8.9 mi ExSE of Lawton ND, 48°21′57″N 098°32′00″W
F-10 4.3 mi NxNW of Lawton ND, 48°21′46″N 098°23′07″W

- G-0 (MAF) 5.3 mi SW of Fordville ND; 26.0 mi WxNW of Grand Forks AFB
  48°09′14″N 097°52′06″W

G-11 9.6 mi N of Fordville ND, 48°20′45″N 097°45′19″W
G-12 12.1 mi SxSW of Fordville ND, 48°21′22″N 097°38′50″W
G-13 5.7 mi NxNE of Fordville ND, 48°16′46″N 097°43′38″W
G-14 9.7 mi SW of Fordville ND, 48°17′19″N 097°37′01″W
G-15 8.0 mi W of Fordville ND, 48°12′53″N 097°37′09″W
G-16 8.8 mi SE of Fordville ND, 48°07′53″N 097°38′26″W
G-17 14.0 mi N of Fordville ND, 48°00′27″N 097°48′53″W
G-18 9.7 mi SxSW of Fordville ND, 48°04′33″N 097°51′25″W
G-19 15.4 mi NxNE of Fordville ND, 48°00′10″N 097°54′49″W
G-20 9.0 mi WxSW of Fordville ND, 48°09′49″N 097°58′24″W

- H-0 (MAF) 5.1 mi N of Michigan ND; 35.1 mi WxNW of Grand Forks AFB
  48°05′46″N 098°06′56″W

H-21 9.9 mi N of Michigan ND, 48°09′50″N 098°05′01″W
H-22 7.6 mi NE of Michigan ND, 48°05′09″N 097°59′12″W
H-23 3.3 mi E of Michigan ND, 48°01′48″N 098°03′05″W
H-24 4.7 mi SxSE of Michigan ND, 47°57′36″N 098°05′16″W
H-25 2.0 mi W of Michigan ND, 48°01′07″N 098°09′50″W
H-26 7.2 mi SW of Michigan ND, 47°57′33″N 098°14′39″W
H-27 6.0 mi NW of Michigan ND, 48°04′37″N 098°13′26″W
H-28 10.7 mi WxNW of Michigan ND, 48°04′35″N 098°20′21″W
H-29 12.3 mi NW of Michigan ND, 48°09′13″N 098°18′07″W
H-30 11.9 mi SxSE of Michigan ND, 48°10′58″N 098°13′06″W

- I-0 (MAF) 6.6 mi ExNE of Tolna ND; 43.1 mi W of Grand Forks AFB
  47°50′54″N 098°17′53″W

I-31 22.4 mi ExNE of Tolna ND, 47°56′36″N 097°59′12″W
I-32 27.0 mi WxSW of Tolna ND, 47°56′19″N 097°52′44″W
I-33 18.4 mi WxSW of Tolna ND, 47°53′14″N 098°03′02″W
I-34 30.7 mi W of Tolna ND, 47°54′22″N 097°47′08″W
I-35 13.0 mi W of Tolna ND, 47°50′01″N 098°09′28″W
I-36 4.2 mi NxNW of Tolna ND, 47°46′17″N 098°24′03″W
I-37 11.0 mi SW of Tolna ND, 47°41′57″N 098°34′40″W
I-38 6.9 mi SxSW of Tolna ND, 47°44′32″N 098°30′54″W
I-39 2.9 mi W of Tolna ND, 47°49′47″N 098°29′55″W
I-40 8.2 mi NE of Tolna ND, 47°55′26″N 098°20′13″W

- J-0 (MAF) 6.0 mi SW of Brocket ND; 51.1 mi WxNW f Grand Forks AFB
  48°09′14″N 098°27′03″W

J-41 4.5 mi WxNW of Brocket ND, 48°13′33″N 098°27′03″W
J-42 10.9 mi SxSW of Brocket ND, 48°04′04″N 098°26′49″W
J-43 17.5 mi SxSW of Brocket ND, 47°59′08″N 098°31′20″W
J-44 16.1 mi NE of Brocket ND, 48°02′30″N 098°35′31″W
J-45 10.9 mi WxSW of Brocket ND, 48°07′44″N 098°33′19″W
J-46 16.1 mi ExNE of Brocket ND, 48°06′20″N 098°39′48″W
J-47 14.1 mi E of Brocket ND, 48°11′00″N 098°39′25″W
J-48 9.2 mi W of Brocket ND, 48°12′41″N 098°33′18″W
J-49 12.9 mi ExSE of Brocket ND, 48°17′53″N 098°36′14″W
J-50 8.2 mi NW of Brocket ND, 48°17′54″N 098°28′43″W

=== 448th Missile Squadron ===
Activated by Strategic Air Command on 1 November 1963. Organized on 1 September 1965. Inactivated on 30 September 1998

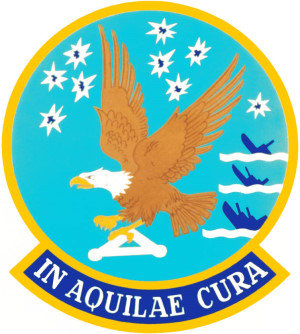
Emblem of the 448th Missile Squadron

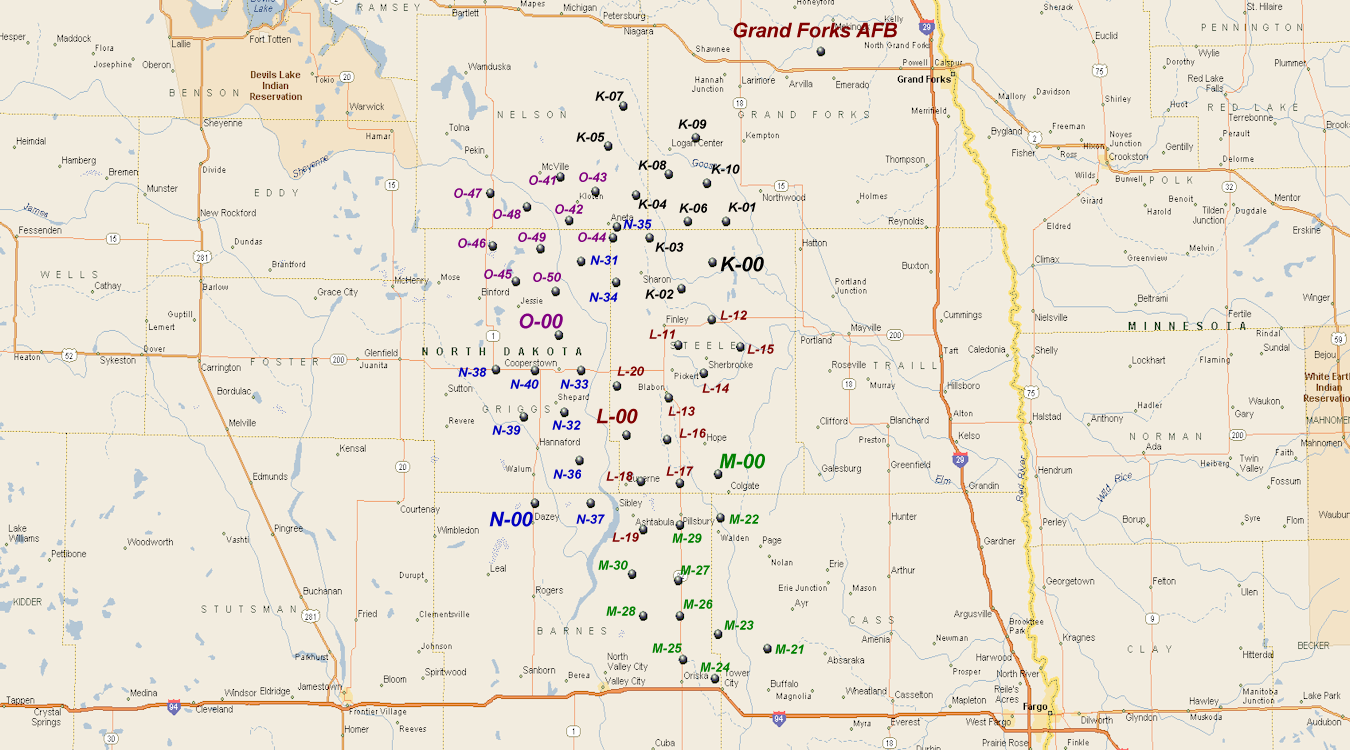
448th Missile Squadron – Missile Alert Facilities and Launch Facilities

- K-0 (MAF) 9.6 mi NE of Finley ND; 28.1 mi SxSW of Grand Forks AFB
  47°37′01″N 097°42′14″W

K-01 14.4 mi NE of Finley ND, 47°41′05″N 097°39′51″W
K-02 4.9 mi NxNE of Finley ND, 47°34′26″N 097°47′22″W
K-03 10.2 mi N of Finley ND, 47°39′25″N 097°52′36″W
K-04 15.4 mi NxNW of Finley ND, 47°43′40″N 097°54′50″W
K-05 21.7 mi NxNW of Finley ND, 47°48′26″N 097°59′34″W
K-06 12.3 mi NxNE of Finley ND, 47°41′03″N 097°46′13″W
K-07 25.6 mi N of Finley ND, 47°52′23″N 097°56′59″W
K-08 17.3 mi N of Finley ND, 47°45′40″N 097°49′26″W
K-09 21.7 mi N of Finley ND, 47°49′12″N 097°45′00″W
K-10 17.2 mi NxNE of Finley ND, 47°44′48″N 097°43′04″W

- L-0 (MAF) 10.5 mi W of Hope ND; 50.6 mi SxSW of Grand Forks AFB
  47°20′03″N 097°56′24″W

L-11 11.7 mi NxNW of Hope ND, 47°28′56″N 097°47′54″W
L-12 13.8 mi N of Hope ND, 47°31′22″N 097°42′17″W
L-13 7.1 mi NW of Hope ND, 47°23′44″N 097°49′25″W
L-14 7.8 mi N of Hope ND, 47°26′09″N 097°43′35″W
L-15 11.6 mi NxNE of Hope ND, 47°28′43″N 097°37′32″W
L-16 5.2 mi W of Hope ND, 47°19′40″N 097°49′41″W
L-17 5.9 mi SW of Hope ND, 47°15′24″N 097°47′40″W
L-18 9.7 mi WxSW of Hope ND, 47°15′34″N 097°54′01″W
L-19 12.9 mi SW of Hope ND, 47°10′48″N 097°53′36″W
L-20 13.4 mi ExSE of Hope ND, 47°24′55″N 097°58′03″W

- M-0 (MAF) 6.6 mi NE of Pillsbury ND; 49.8 mi SxSW of Grand Forks AFB
  47°16′17″N 097°41′19″W

M-21 19.1 mi SE of Pillsbury ND, 46°59′05″N 097°33′16″W
M-22 5.3 mi E of Pillsbury ND, 47°11′59″N 097°40′55″W
M-23 14.6 mi NxNW of Pillsbury ND, 47°00′34″N 097°41′21″W
M-24 19.3 mi NxNW of Pillsbury ND, 46°56′11″N 097°41′54″W
M-25 16.6 mi N of Pillsbury ND, 46°58′06″N 097°47′02″W
M-26 11.7 mi S of Pillsbury ND, 47°02′21″N 097°47′38″W
M-27 7.7 mi S of Pillsbury ND, 47°05′48″N 097°47′50″W
M-28 12.6 mi NxNE of Pillsbury ND, 47°02′20″N 097°53′35″W
M-29 1.4 mi S of Pillsbury ND, 47°11′16″N 097°47′39″W
M-30 9.3 mi SW of Pillsbury ND, 47°06′27″N 097°55′26″W

- N-0 (MAF) 6.1 mi S of Hannaford ND; 63.5 mi SW of Grand Forks AFB
  47°13′24″N 098°11′30″W

N-31 21.9 mi NxNE of Hannaford ND,47°37′04″N 098°03′59″W
N-32 5.5 mi NE of Hannaford ND,47°22′19″N 098°06′40″W
N-33 10.6 mi NxNE of Hannaford ND,47°26′23″N 098°03′58″W
N-34 21.5 mi NxNE of Hannaford ND,47°35′03″N 097°58′12″W
N-35 13.0 mi NxNE of Hannaford ND,47°30′32″N 097°58′02″W
N-36 5.7 mi ExSE of Hannaford ND,47°17′33″N 098°04′13″W
N-37 9.3 mi SE of Hannaford ND,47°13′23″N 098°02′19″W
N-38 10.4 mi SxSE of Hannaford ND,47°26′25″N 098°18′06″W
N-39 4.0 mi NxNW of Hannaford ND,47°21′50″N 098°13′26″W
N 40 8.9 mi N of Hannaford ND,47°26′25″N 098°11′38″W

- O-0 (MAF) 3.6 mi N of Cooperstown ND; 47.2 mi SW of Grand Forks AFB
  47°29′51″N 098°07′37″W

O-41 21.6 mi N of Cooperstown ND, 47°45′25″N 098°07′29″W
O-42 16.6 mi N of Cooperstown ND, 47°41′05″N 098°06′01″W
O-43 20.4 mi NxNE of Cooperstown ND, 47°43′58″N 098°01′40″W
O-44 16.2 mi NxNE of Cooperstown ND, 47°39′25″N 097°58′44″W
O-45 11.2 mi NxNW of Cooperstown ND, 47°35′05″N 098°14′49″W
O-46 16.3 mi NxNW of Cooperstown ND, 47°38′34″N 098°18′44″W
O-47 21.6 mi N of Cooperstown ND, 47°43′42″N 098°19′09″W
O-48 18.6 mi NxNW of Cooperstown ND, 47°42′23″N 098°13′02″W
O-49 13.7 mi N of Cooperstown ND, 47°38′22″N 098°10′46″W
O-50 8.6 mi N of Cooperstown ND, 47°34′08″N 098°08′15″W
