= 18th Field Artillery Brigade =

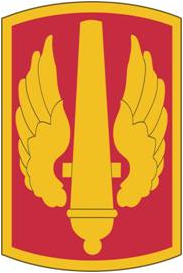
- Shoulder sleeve insignia (SSI)
- Active: 1943–1945, 1951–present
- Country: United States
- Branch: United States Army
- Type: Field artillery
- Role: Corps Force Fires HQs
- Size: Brigade
- Part of: XVIII Airborne Corps
- Garrison/HQ: Fort Bragg, NC
- Nickname: The Steel Brigade
- Mottos: "Tough, Proud, Disciplined"
- Equipment: M142 HIMARS
- Engagements: World War II; Operations Desert Shield & Desert Storm; Operation Enduring Freedom, Afghanistan; Operation Iraqi Freedom
- Website: 18th Fires Homepage

Commanders
- Current commander: COL Andrew Hercik
- Command Sergeant Major: CSM George Cabrera

Insignia
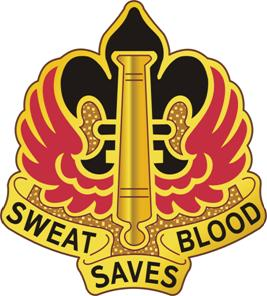
- Distinctive unit insignia

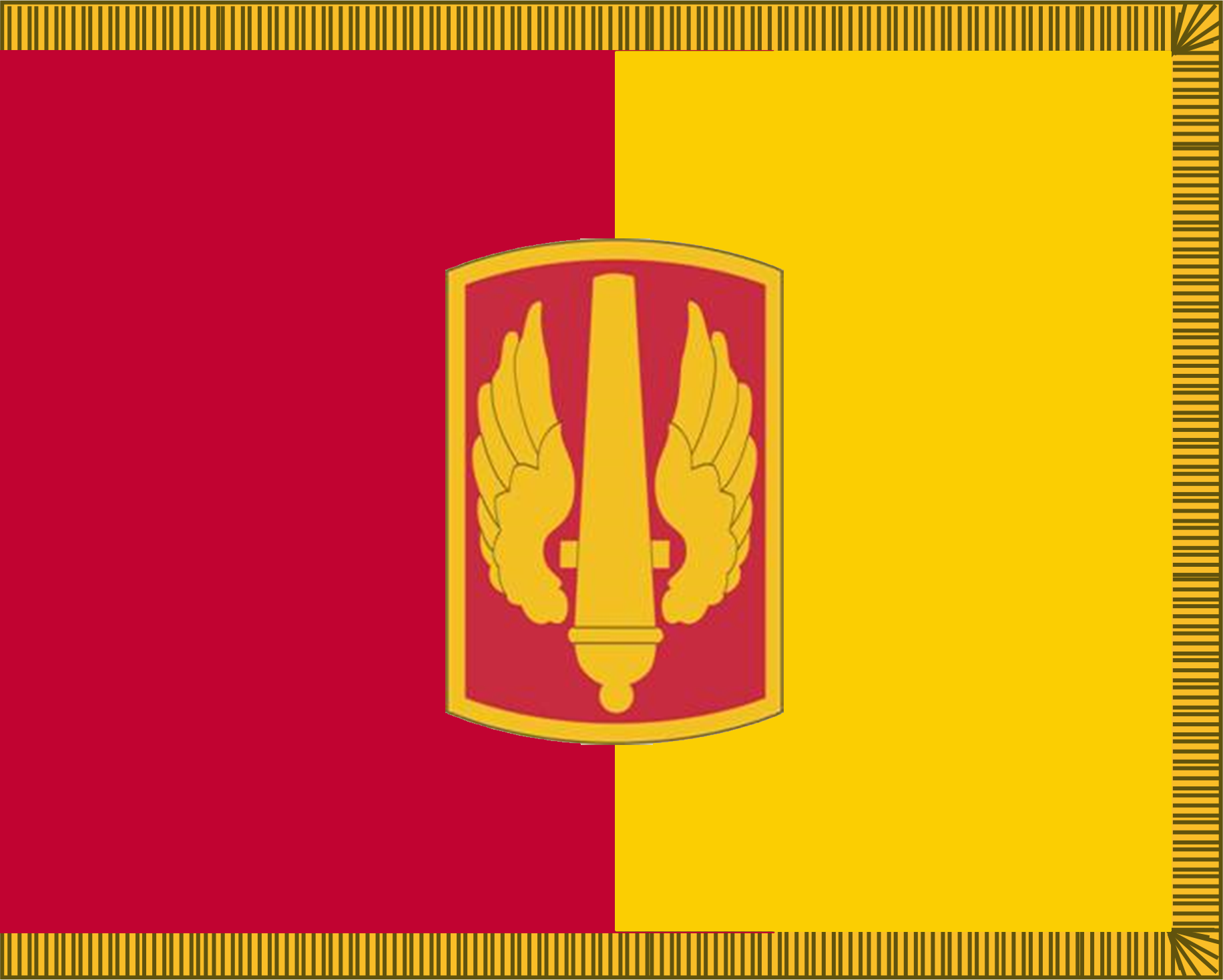
- 18th Artillery Brigade Flag

The 18th Field Artillery Brigade is the XVIII Airborne Corps field artillery brigade, based at Fort Bragg, North Carolina.

== Role and structure ==
The 18th Field Artillery Brigade is America's Contingency Field Artillery Brigade. The Brigade plans, synchronizes and employs long range precision strike fires and counterfires in support of the XVIII Airborne Corps, its subordinate divisions, and to Special Operations forces as required. When the call comes, the Brigade is ready to deploy, fight and win. This brigade consists of the following units

- Headquarters and Headquarters Battery
- 3rd Battalion, 27th Field Artillery Regiment
  - 3 × batteries with 9× M142 HIMARS each (changed from the old 2×8 structure to the new 3×9 structure in November 2021)
- 3rd Battalion, 321st Field Artillery Regiment—High Mobility Artillery Rocket System (HIMARS)
  - 3 × batteries with 9× M142 HIMARS each (changed from the old 2×8 structure to the new 3×9 structure in July 2023)
- 188th Brigade Support Battalion

== Operational history ==
The 18th Field Artillery Brigade has served in multiple capacities over the past decade in support of Operation Iraqi Freedom as well as the primary 155mm howitzer and HIMARS identity in the war in Afghanistan. The brigade was the only airborne field artillery brigade in the United States Army with 1st Battalion (Airborne), 321st Field Artillery Regiment providing the majority of the support for the 18th Fires Brigade's airborne mission.

During the 1990s the Brigade had a single M198, 155mm battery (initially Battery C, 5th Battalion, 8th Field Artillery; later Battery C, 1st Battalion, 377th Field Artillery Regiment) assigned to Fort Campbell, Kentucky, in support of the 101st Airborne Division (Air Assault). This made for a healthy rivalry with the other two batteries of the Battalion that were assigned in support of the 82nd Airborne Division. It allowed for the entire Battalion to train together at both Fort Campbell and Fort Bragg.

1st Battalion (Airborne), 321st Field Artillery Regiment maintained a full capacity to provide 155mm howitzer fires anywhere in the world within 18 hours in support of the 82d Airborne Division and while supporting other global responsibilities. The unit had the unique ability to employ 155mm howitzer platforms through a "Howitzer Heavy Drop Package" capability which essentially allowed for the weapon system to be dropped from an aircraft while its paratroopers would then place the weapon into action. 1st Battalion (Airborne), 321st Field Artillery Regiment served as the United States Army's primary 155mm howitzer response in the Global War on Terrorism. In October 2013, the battalion's three firing batteries were reflagged to create 155mm composite battalions in the three brigade combat teams of the 82nd Airborne, and the battalion was officially inactivated at Fort Bragg on 14 March 2014.

During 2008 while serving as the General Support Artillery unit in Operation Enduring Freedom 8–9, 3d Section, Battery C, 3d Battalion, 321st Field Artillery Regiment became the first United States Army unit to fire the GPS Guided XM982 Excalibur Munition in support of combat operations while serving in the volatile Kunar Province while supporting the 2d Battalion (Airborne), 503d Infantry Regiment of the 173rd Airborne Brigade Combat Team.

3d Battalion, 27th Field Artillery Regiment (HIMARS) has served in the capacity to support various United States Army and other agencies with accurate and effective field artillery rocket fires.

From August 2009 through October 2014, the 18th Fires Brigade wore the "All American" patch of the 82nd Airborne Division. The 18th Fires Brigade became a general support field artillery brigade in July 2008 and was under the Training Readiness Oversight of the 82d Airborne Division at Fort Bragg, North Carolina.

The 18th Fires Brigade held a ceremony on 16 October 2014, removing the patch of the 82nd Airborne Division and donning the 18th Field Artillery Brigade patch, to signify its increased responsibility to provide long range field artillery support to the four Divisions in the XVIII Airborne Corps, and officially change its name to the 18th Field Artillery Brigade, a name held by the Brigade since its inception in 1978.

== Future ==
An article in the Fayetteville Observer dated 23 March 2014 covered the inactivation of the brigade's 1st Battalion (Airborne), 321st FA Regiment and noted the coming inactivation the 2d Battalion in the 4th BCT, 82d Airborne Division. The article added that the brigade's 3d Battalion "will undergo a different transformation as that unit shifts from howitzers to the HIMARS weapons system."

== Lineage and honors ==
=== Lineage ===
- Constituted 1 October 1943 in the Army of the United States as Headquarters and Headquarters Battery, XVIII Corps Artillery
- Activated 9 October 1943 at Camp Cooke, California
- Inactivated 15 October 1945 at Camp Cooke, California
- Redesignated 1 May 1951 as Headquarters and Headquarters Battery, XVIII Airborne Corps Artillery, and allotted to the Regular Army
- Activated 21 May 1951 at Fort Bragg, North Carolina
- Reorganized and redesignated 16 September 1978 as Headquarters and Headquarters Battery, 18th Field Artillery Brigade
- Reorganized and redesignated 16 June 2007 as Headquarters and Headquarters Battery, 18th Fires Brigade
- Reorganized and redesignated 16 October 2014 as Headquarters and Headquarters Battery, 18th Field Artillery Brigade

=== Campaign participation credit ===
- World War II: Rhineland, Ardennes-Alsace, Central Europe
- Southwest Asia: Defense of Saudi Arabia, Liberation and Defense of Kuwait
- War on Terrorism: Campaigns to be determined

=== Decorations ===
- Meritorious Unit Commendation (Army), Streamer embroidered IRAQ 2005–2006
- Meritorious Unit Commendation (Army), Afghanistan-2010

== Heraldry ==
=== Shoulder sleeve insignia ===
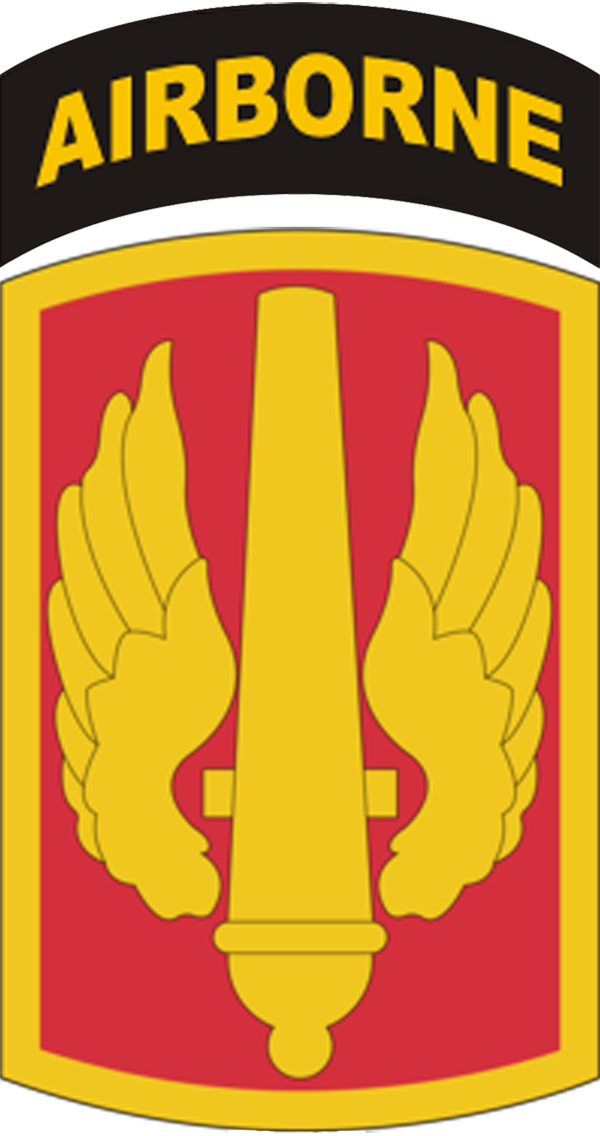
Former SSI from 1992 to 2007

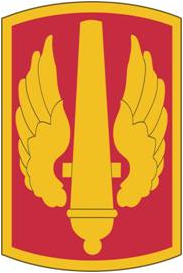
Current SSI

- Description/Blazon: On a scarlet shield arched at top and bottom, 2 inches (5.08 cm) in width and 3 inches (7.62 cm) in height, a vertical yellow winged cannon, cascabel in base, all within a 1/8 inch (.32 cm) yellow border.
- Symbolism: Scarlet and yellow are colors traditionally associated with Artillery units as well as the cannon barrel. The wings are indicative of the mobility, speed and devastating accuracy of the modern artillery.
- Background: The shoulder sleeve insignia was originally approved for the 18th Field Artillery Brigade on 29 May 1979. It was amended to include the airborne tab, add metric measurements and revise the description on 21 October 1992. It was again amended to change the color of the airborne tab on 5 February 2003. The insignia was redesignated for the 18th Fires Brigade and amended to delete the airborne tab on 22 March 2007. (TIOH Drawing Number A-1-639)

=== Distinctive unit insignia ===
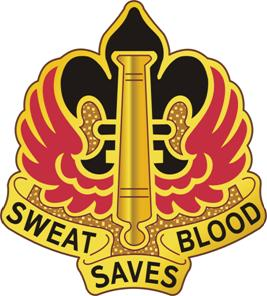

- Description/Blazon: A gold color metal and enamel device 1 3/16 inches (3.02 cm) in height overall, consisting of a gold vertical cannon barrel with muzzle end up centered in front of a black fleur-de-lis, and issuant from either side of the barrel below the trunnion a scarlet wing upraised enclosing the sides of the fleur-de-lis; attached in base a gold scroll of three folds bearing in black letters the words "SWEAT SAVES BLOOD."
- Symbolism: Scarlet and yellow are the colors associated with Artillery. The cannon barrel denotes the organization's basic mission, and the wings refer to the air deployment capability. The fleur-de-lis represents service in Europe during World War II.
- Background: The distinctive unit insignia was originally approved for the 18th Field Artillery Brigade on 28 August 1979. It was redesignated for the 18th Fires Brigade with the description updated on 22 March 2007.

=== Combat service identification badge ===
- Description/Blazon: A gold color metal and enamel device 2 inches (5.08 cm) in height consisting of a design similar to the shoulder sleeve insignia.

=== Former beret flashes ===
18th Field Artillery Brigade

Description/Blazon: On a scarlet shield-shaped embroidered item with a semi-circular base 2 1/4 inches (5.72 cm) in height and 1 7/8 inches (4.76 cm) in width overall and edged with a 1/8 inch (.32 cm) yellow border, a yellow lozenge throughout. The flash was approved on 13 March 1981.

=== Former background trimming ===
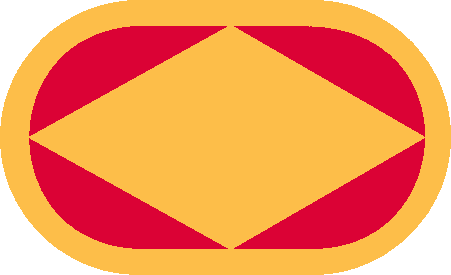
18th Field Artillery Brigade

Description/Blazon: On a scarlet oval-shaped embroidered item edged with a 1/8 inch (.32 cm) yellow border, 1 3/8 inches (3.49 cm) in height and 2 1/4 inches (5.72 cm) in width, overall a yellow lozenge throughout. The background trimming was approved on 23 December 1997.

== See also ==
- XVIII Airborne Corps
- 82nd Airborne Division
- 8th Field Artillery Regiment
