= 3rd Battalion, 321st Field Artillery Regiment =

US army unit

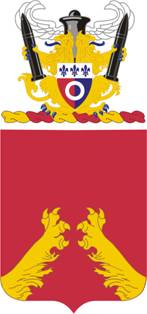
- Coat of arms
- Active: 1917
- Country: United States of America
- Branch: United States Army
- Type: Field Artillery
- Size: battalion
- Part of: 18th Field Artillery Brigade
- Home station: Fort Bragg, NC
- Motto: "Noli Me Tangere" (Don’t Tread On Me)

Commanders
- Current commander: LTC Adam Buchanan
- Ceremonial chief: CSM Steven Newman

Insignia
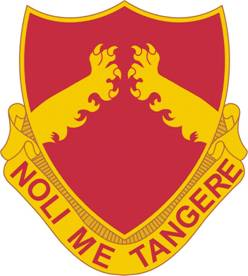
- Distinctive unit insignia

The 3rd Battalion, 321st Field Artillery Regiment (3-321 FAR) is an artillery battalion, assigned to the 18th Field Artillery Brigade, part of the US Army XVIII Airborne Corps at Fort Bragg, NC. The battalion has served in World War I, World War II, Vietnam, and the Global War on Terror. The battalion is equipped with M142 HIMARS rocket launchers.

== History ==
=== World War I ===
3-321 FAR traces its lineage to Battery C, 321st Field Artillery, which organized on 2 September 1917 at Camp Gordon, Georgia. After training at Camp Gordon until May 1918, the battery shipped to France, and participated with the regiment in the St. Mihiel, Meuse Argonne and Lorraine 1918 campaigns. Following the Armistice, the battery redeployed to the United States and was demobilized at Camp Dix, New Jersey in May 1919.

== Lineage and honors ==
=== Lineage ===
- Constituted 5 August 1917 in the National Army as Battery C, 321st Field Artillery, an element of the 82nd Division
- Organized 2 September 1917 at Camp Gordon, Georgia
- Demobilized 26 May 1919 at Camp Dix, New Jersey
- Reconstituted 5 June 1930 in the Organized Reserves and consolidated with Battery C, 321st Field Artillery (constituted in July 1923 in the Organized Reserves as Battery C, 452nd Field Artillery, and organized in Georgia; redesignated 5 October 1929 as Battery C, 321st Field Artillery, and element of the 82nd Division); consolidated unit designated as Battery C, 321st Field Artillery, an element of the 82nd Division (later redesignated as the 82nd Airborne Division)
- Reorganized and redesignated 13 February 1942 as Battery C, 321st Field Artillery Battalion
- Ordered into active military service 25 March 1942 and reorganized at Camp Claiborne, Louisiana
- Reorganized and redesignated 15 August 1942 as Battery C, 321st Glider Field Artillery Battalion, an element of the 101st Airborne Division
- Disbanded 4 September 1942 at Camp Claiborne, Louisiana
- Reconstituted 1 March 1957 in the Regular Army; concurrently consolidated with Battery C, 321st Airborne Field Artillery Battalion (active)(see ANNEX), and consolidated unit designated as Battery C, 321st Airborne Field Artillery Battalion, and element of the 101st Airborne Division
- Reorganized and redesignated 25 April 1957 as Battery C, 321st Artillery
- Relieved 21 January 1964 from assignment to the 101st Airborne Division
- Inactivated 3 February 1964 at Fort Campbell, Kentucky
- Redesignated 1 September 1971 as Battery C, 321st Field Artillery
- Redesignated 28 February 1987 as Headquarters and Headquarters Battery, 3rd Battalion, 321st Field Artillery; Headquarters concurrently transferred to the United States Army Training and Doctrine Command and activated at Fort Sill, Oklahoma
- Inactivated 15 January 1996 at Fort Sill, Oklahoma
- Withdrawn 16 January 1996 from the United States Army Training and Doctrine Command and activated at Fort Bragg, North Carolina (organic elements concurrently constituted and activated)

==== ANNEX ====
- Constituted 5 August 1917 in the National Army as part of the 307th Ammunition Train, an element of the 82nd Division
- Organized in October 1917 at Camp Gordon, Georgia
- Demobilized 23 May 1919 at Camp Upton, New York
- Reconstituted 24 June 1921 in the Organized Reserves as part of the 307th Ammunition Train, an element of the 82nd Division
- Organized in January 1922 at Newberry, South Carolina
- Reorganized and redesignated 13 February 1942 as Battery B, 907th Field Artillery Battalion
- Ordered into active military service 25 March 1942 and reorganized at Camp Claiborne, Louisiana
- Inactivated 30 November 1945 in Germany

(Organized Reserves redesignated 25 March 1948 as the Organized Reserve Corps)

- Redesignated 18 June 1948 as Battery C, 518th Airborne Field Artillery Battalion

(518th Field Artillery Battalion withdrawn 25 June 1948 from the Organized Reserve Corps and allotted to the Regular Army)

- Activated 6 July 1948 at Camp Breckinridge, Kentucky
- Inactivated 1 April 1949 at Camp Breckinridge, Kentucky
- Activated 25 August 1950 at Camp Breckinridge, Kentucky
- Inactivated 1 December 1953 at Camp Breckinridge, Kentucky
- Activated 15 May 1954 at Fort Jackson, South Carolina
- Redesignated 1 July 1956 as Battery C, 321st Airborne Field Artillery Battalion, an element of the 101st Airborne Division

=== Campaign participation credit ===
- World War I: St. Mihiel; Meuse-Argonne; Lorraine 1918
- World War II: Normandy (with arrowhead); Rhineland (with arrowhead); Ardennes-Alsace; Central Europe
- War on Terrorism: Campaigns to be determined

=== Decorations ===
- Presidential Unit Citation (Army) for BASTOGNE
- French Croix de Guerre with Palm, World War II for NORMANDY
- Belgian Fourragere 1940
  - Cited in the Order of the Day of the Belgian Army for action in BELGIUM AND GERMANY
- Belgian Croix de Guerre 1940 with Palm for BASTOGNE; cited in the Order of the Day of the Belgian Army for action at Bastogne
- Netherlands Orange Lanyard

Battery A additionally entitled to:
- Meritorious Unit Commendation, Streamer embroidered IRAQ 2005-2006
- Meritorious Unit Commendation, Streamer embroidered AFGHANISTAN 2011
Battery B additionally entitled to:
- Meritorious Unit Commendation, Streamer embroidered AFGHANISTAN 2010
Battery C additionally entitled to:
- Valorous Unit Award, Streamer embroidered AFGHANISTAN 2008
- Meritorious Unit Commendation, Streamer embroidered IRAQ 2005-2006
- Meritorious Unit Commendation, Streamer embroidered AFGHANISTAN 2008

Note: Separately cited awards are not listed by the official Army lineage and honors, last updated 12 September 1996.

== Heraldry ==
=== Distinctive unit insignia ===
321st Field Artillery Regiment Distinctive Unit Insignia

=== Coat of arms ===
321st Field Artillery Regiment Coat of Arms

== See also ==
- Field Artillery Branch (United States)
