= 321st Field Artillery Regiment =

US military unit

321st Field Artillery Regiment (321st FAR)
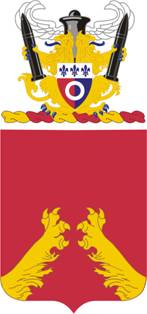
- Coat of arms
- Active: 1917
- Country: United States
- Branch: Army
- Type: Field artillery
- Motto: "Noli Me Tangere" (Touch-Me-Not)

Commanders
- Honorary Colonel of the Regiment: COL(R) William Malouche
- Honorary Sergeant Major of the Regiment: CSM(R) Tony Guerrero

Insignia
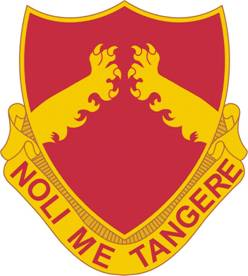
- Distinctive unit insignia

The 321st Field Artillery Regiment (321st FAR) is a field artillery regiment of the United States Army. A parent regiment under the U.S. Army Regimental System, the 321st FAR currently has one active battalion, the 3rd Battalion, 321st FAR, assigned to the 18th Field Artillery Brigade at Fort Bragg, NC. The battalion is equipped with M142 HIMARS.
The regiment served with the 82nd Division during World War I and with the 101st Airborne Division during World War II. Elements of the regiment have served with the 82nd and 101st Airborne Divisions in Vietnam, and with the 82nd Airborne Division and 18th Field Artillery Brigade during the Global War on Terrorism.

== Current Status of Regimental Elements ==
- 1st Battalion (Airborne), 321st Field Artillery Regiment: Inactive since 14 March 2014
- 2nd Battalion (Airborne), 321st Field Artillery Regiment: Inactive since 14 May 2014
- 3rd Battalion, 321st Field Artillery Regiment: Active, assigned to 18th Field Artillery Brigade
- Battery D, 321st Field Artillery Regiment: Inactive since 1 July 1958
- Battery E, 321st Field Artillery Regiment: Inactive since 1 July 1958

== History ==
=== World War I ===
Initially formed at Camp Gordon, Georgia, the 321st was part of the 82nd Division's 157th Field Artillery Brigade. On 5 September 1917, a small cadre of Regular Army non-commissioned officers and privates joined officer cadres that had reported on 29 August 1917 after graduating from the three batteries of the 7th Provisional Training Regiment. Draftees from Georgia, Alabama and Tennessee arrived over the next few weeks, but many of these men were transferred in November and replaced by new draftees from Texas, Oklahoma, Iowa and Minnesota and all the states east of the Mississippi River.
Initially, the 321st's six firing batteries shared a single battery of 3-inch guns for training with the other 12 batteries in the brigade. In addition to approximately 10 hours use of the actual guns, the regiment's gun squads conducted training with replicas "crudely made structures fashioned from the trunks of small trees, tin cans, spools, gas pipes and any available material." A second battery of guns arrived in December, and from December 1917 through May 1918, the regiment conducted firing practice at Blackjack Mountain near Marietta, Georgia. During the training period, the 321st was designated as a motorized unit, causing a personnel shuffle and additional training in engine maintenance (mostly done without actual equipment!).

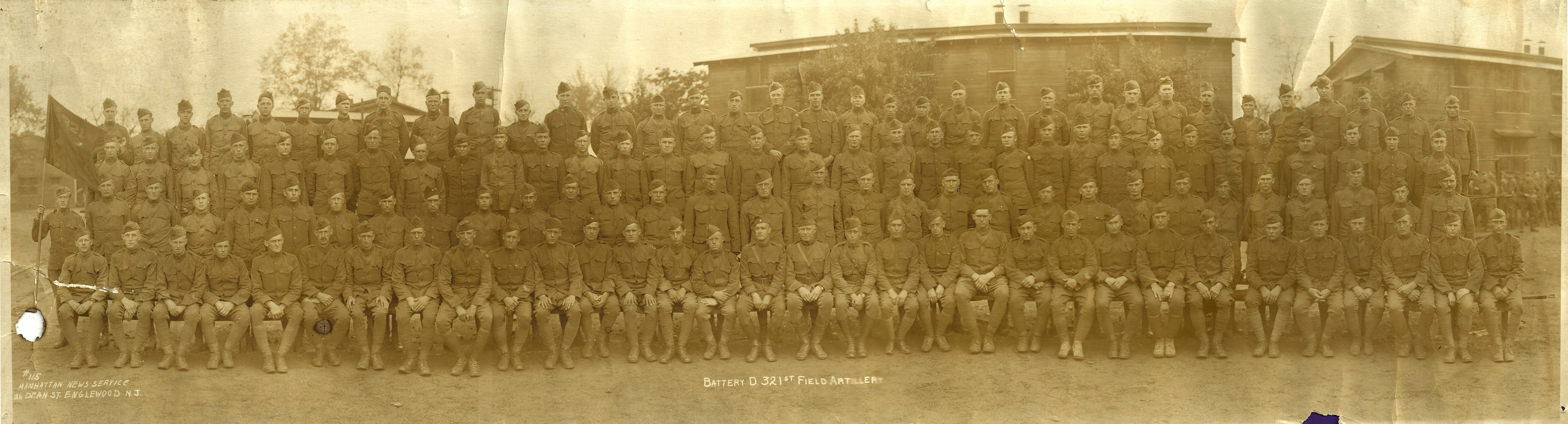
Battery D of the 321st Field Artillery at Camp Gordon, GA, ca. 1917

Beginning 8 May 1918, the regiment moved by train to Camp Mills, New York, and then shipped to Liverpool, England on the ship Cretic, arriving on 31 May 1918. After a brief stop, the regiment crossed the English Channel from Southampton to Le Havre, France and then moved by train to La Courtine. There, the 321st was fully equipped with 75mm guns and conducted two months of training, culminating in a brigade live fire.
From 5–10 August, the 321st moved into a reserve position behind Chateau Thierry, but was not employed and moved by train to Toul. The 321st detached its 1st Battalion to the 89th Division, while 2nd Battalion occupied defensive positions in the Marbache sector with the 157th/82nd. In preparation for the St. Mihiel Offensive, the 2nd Battalion rejoined the 321st, and the regiment moved into forward gun positions constructed with the assistance of the division's infantry. Beginning at 0100hrs on 12 September 1918, the 321st participated in a four-hour preparation, consisting of counter-battery fires on 16 German batteries and other positions. After the offensive started, the regiment also fired on "fugitive targets", and Battery C destroyed a German airplane that had made a forced landing. On 13 September, the 321st and its sister 320th Field Artillery fired 10000 rounds in support of a raid by the 327th Infantry in the Bois Frehaut. The result of the St. Mihiel operation was "the establishment of confidence, born of performance" throughout the 157th Brigade.
After relief on 20 September and assembling near Marbache, the 321st spent the nights of 22–25 September moving to Beauzee, arriving on the morning of 26 September. On 26 September, the regiment moved to bivouac's near Futeau in the Argonne Forest, remaining there until 5 October.
At 1300 hours on 5 October 1918, the 157th received orders for an attack at 0500 hours the next morning. Colonel Deems and four officers arrived at the brigade headquarters at 1630 hours, conducted a hurried reconnaissance of battalion areas near l'Esperance Farm and established a regimental command post at Chaudron Farm, with the 320th Field Artillery's command post. The regiment departed its bivouac at 1530 hours, but poor roads and miscommunications delayed its movements, and the first battery began firing at 0520 hours, while it was 8 hours before the regiment's last battery arrived and emplaced.
After participating in a truncated preparation due to the late arrival, the regiment fired in support of the infantry throughout the day. At 1800 hours, the 321st, joined by the 2nd Battalion, 320th Field Artillery in repelling a German counterattack against the 164th Infantry Brigade. Defensive and harassing fire continued through the night of 6–7 October.
7 October was spent in establishing observation posts and telephone communications in the new positions. On 8, 9 and 10 October, the 321st fired rolling barrages to support attacks by the 164th Infantry Brigade's 327th and 328th Infantry Regiments. During the night of 10 October, the 321st moved to new positions southeast of Fleville, to support the 163rd Infantry Brigade. During this attack, from 10 to 22 October, a forward gun from Battery E, 321st, under 1st Lieutenant Prentiss Edwards, closely supported the 326th Infantry, destroying at least 8 machine gun positions and killing at least 20 Germans with 657 rounds. On 14–19 October, the 321st fired a rolling barrage in support of a First Army "general attack" toward the Kriemhilde Stellung positions. On the afternoon of 16 October, the 157th Brigade's machine guns shot down a German airplane, Battery C, 320th Field Artillery and all three batteries of 2nd Battalion, 321st claiming the kill.
On the night of 21–22 October, the 1st Battalion, 321st withdrew to new positions, and the regiment settled into a period of "stabilized warfare" until 1 November. During this period, the regiment fires light harassing schedules at night and continued close support missions to the infantry. Beginning 26 October, the battalion moved one gun per battery into forward positions and conducted adjustments in preparation for a new offensive, scheduled for 1 November. The rest of the batteries moved forward on the night of 30–31 October. During the attack, Batteries E and F of the 321st were assigned as "accompanying batteries" to the 160th Infantry Brigade's 319th and 320th Infantry regiments. The remainder of the 321st participated in a three-stage preparation from 0330 hours. During the night of 1–2 November, the 321st (and the other battalions of the 157th Brigade) moved forward into a between the 319th and 320th Infantries, and suffered heavy artillery and machine gun fire while covering the gap with their battery anti-aircraft machine guns. On the morning of 2 November, the attack resumed at 0800 hours, and the 321st moved forward and established a regimental command post in the town of Imecourt. Due to poor roads which limited the availability of ammunition resupply, the 321st, with 3/319th attached, was chosen to receive the division's ammunition resupply and continue forward in support of the 159th Infantry Brigade. The 2/321 assigned two accompanying guns to the brigade's two infantry regiments, but had difficulty acquiring targets due to the lack of German resistance. On 4 November, the 321st continued to follow the infantry forward, remaining about 2-3000 yards behind the front line. On the morning of 5 November, the 320th relieved the 321st, which did no further "considerable firing" before moving to Sivry-Imecourt-St. Juvin (8–9 November), Monblainvill-Apremont (10 November) and Les Islettes, where it received news of the armistice on 11 November. The entire 157th Brigade remained near Les Islettes until 18 November, and then moved to Ste. Menehould before regjoining the 82nd Division in the Tenth Training area.

=== Interwar ===
The 321st Field Artillery sailed back to the United States in the spring of 1919 and was demobilized at Camp Dix, New Jersey, on 26 May 1919. The War Department initially did not assign 155 mm howitzer regiments to infantry divisions in the reorganization of the early 1920s, and the 321st remained inactive. In 1929, the War Department made the decision to reassign 155 mm howitzers to infantry divisions.

The first iteration of the 452nd Field Artillery was constituted in the Organized Reserve in July 1923, allotted to the Fourth Corps Area, and organized in October 1923 with the regimental headquarters at Macon, Georgia, 1st Battalion at La Grange, Georgia, 2nd Battalion Dublin, Georgia, and 3rd Battalion at Athens, Georgia. It was redesignated the 321st Field Artillery Regiment on 5 October 1929 and consolidated with the World War I 321st Field Artillery, which had been reconstituted in the Organized Reserve on 5 June 1930 per the National Defense Act of 1920, with the consolidated unit designated the 321st Field Artillery and assigned to the 82nd Division. The regimental headquarters was relocated on 1 July 1936 to Gainesville, Florida. The regiment conducted summer training with the 5th Field Artillery Regiment at Fort Bragg, North Carolina, and also conducted Citizens' Military Training Camps at Fort Bragg some years as an alternate form of training. The primary ROTC "feeder" school for new Reserve lieutenants for the regiment was the Georgia Institute of Technology in Atlanta, Georgia.

=== Cold War – Present ===
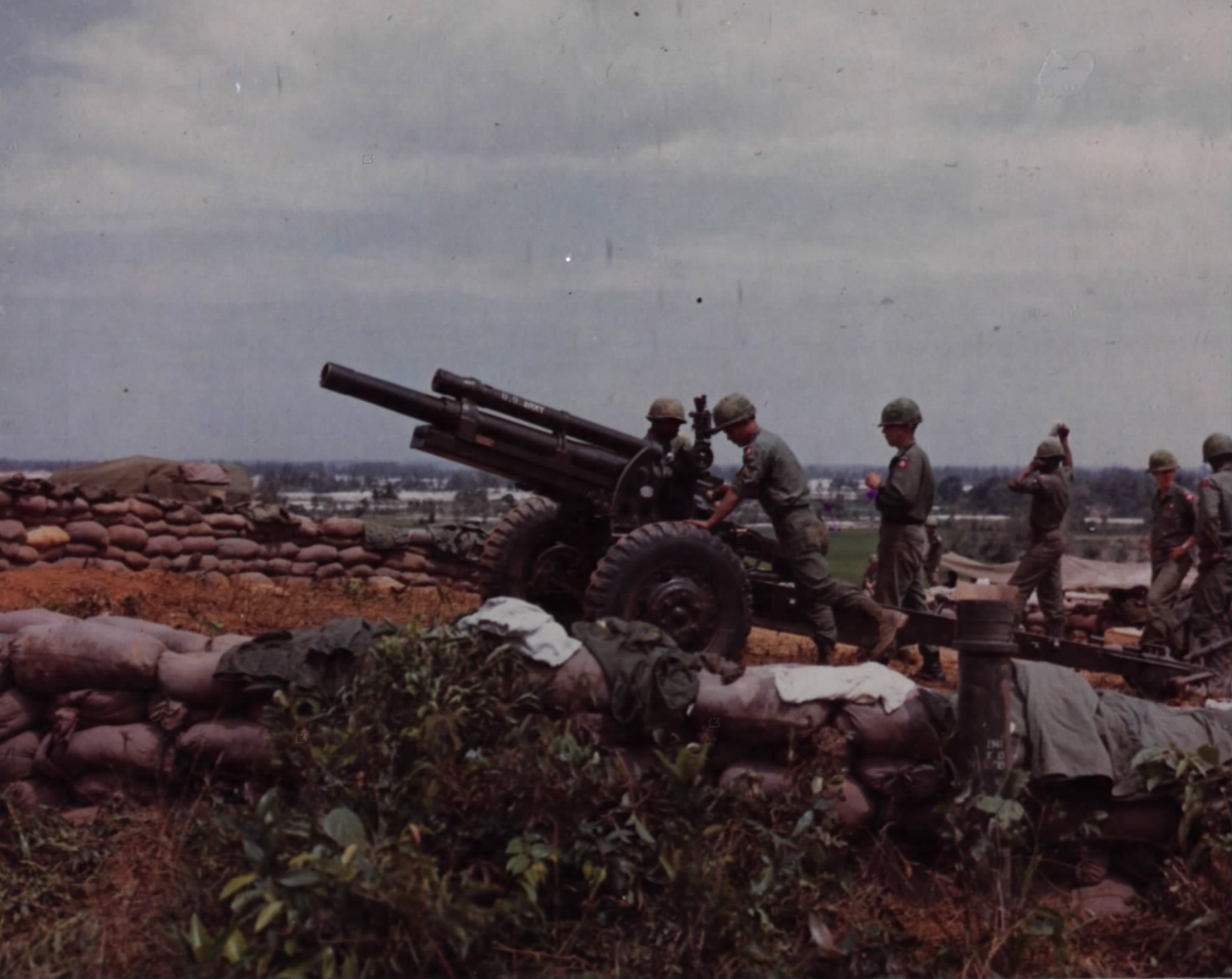
Gun Crew #3, Battery "A", 2nd Battalion, 321st Artillery, fires a 105mm howitzer at LZ Fat City, 22 February 1968

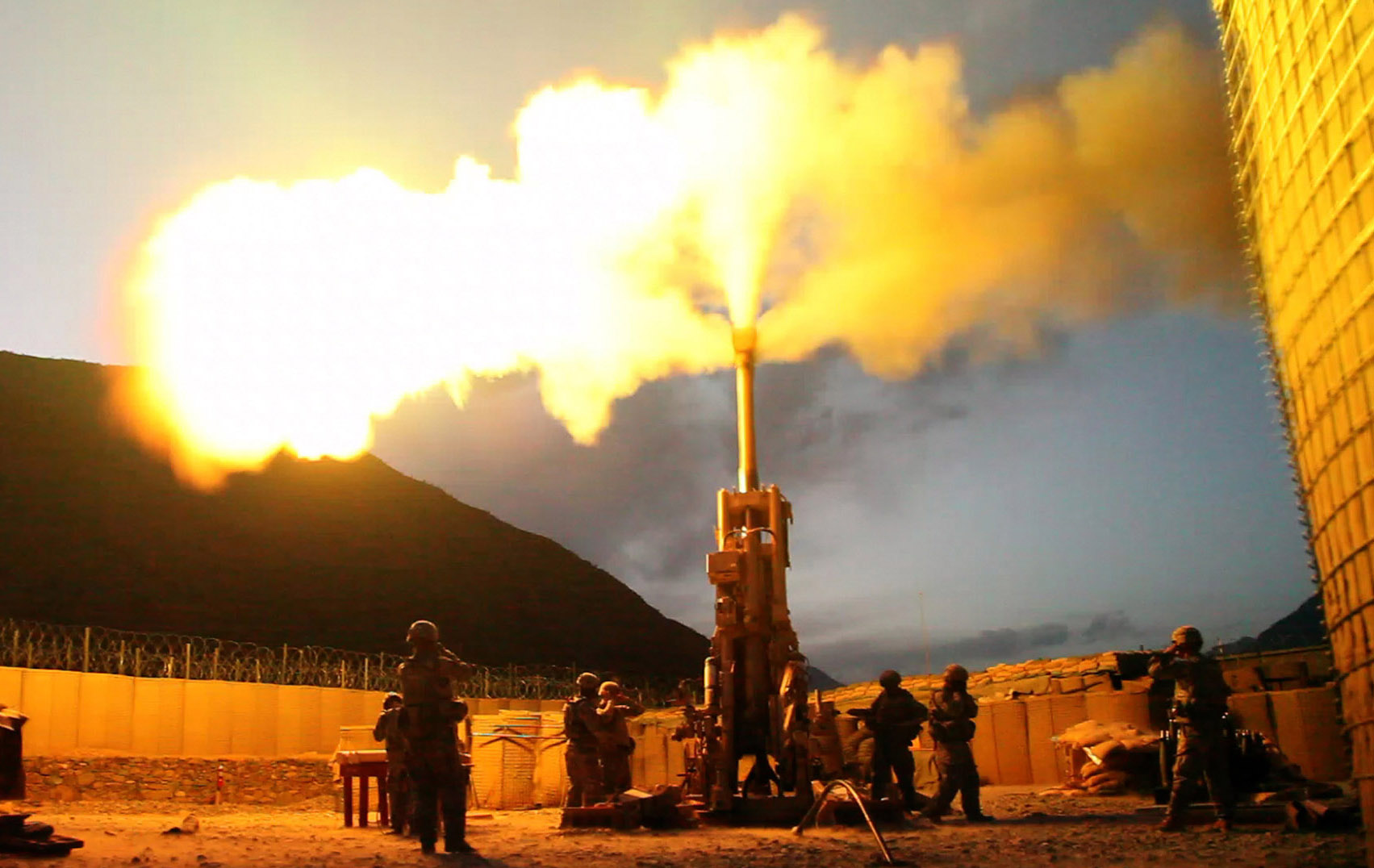
Soldiers with Battery C, 1st Battalion, 321st Airborne Field Artillery Regiment, 18th Fires Brigade, 82nd Airborne Division, fire 155 mm rounds using an M777 Howitzer weapons system, on Forward Operating Base Bostick, Afghanistan, 2009.

== Lineage and honors ==
=== Lineage ===
- Constituted 5 August 1917 in the National Army as the 321st Field Artillery, and assigned to the 82d Division
- Organized 2 September 1917 at Camp Gordon, Georgia
- Demobilized 26 May 1919 at Camp Dix, New Jersey
- Reconstituted 5 June 1930 in the Organized Reserves; concurrently, consolidated with 321st Field Artillery (active) (constituted in July 1923 in the Organized Reserves as the 452d Field Artillery and organized in Georgia; redesignated 5 October 1929 as the 321st Field Artillery, an element of the 82d Division), and consolidated unit designated as the 321st Field Artillery, an element of the 82d Division (later designated as the 82d Airborne Division)
- Reorganized and redesignated 30 January 1942 as the 321st Field Artillery Battalion
- Ordered into active military service 25 March 1942 and reorganized at Camp Claiborne, Louisiana
- Reorganized and redesignated 15 August 1942 as the 321st Glider Field Artillery Battalion; concurrently relieved from assignment to the 82d Airborne Division and assigned to the 101st Airborne Division
- Inactivated 30 November 1945 in Germany
- (Organized Reserves redesignated 25 March 1948 as the Organized Reserve Corps)
- Redesignated 18 June 1948 as the 518th Airborne Field Artillery Battalion, an element of the 101st Airborne Division
- Withdrawn 25 June 1948 from the Organized Reserve Corps and allotted to the Regular Army
- Activated 6 July 1948 at Camp Breckinridge, Kentucky
- Inactivated 1 April 1949 at Camp Breckinridge, Kentucky
- Activated 25 August 1950 at Camp Breckinridge, Kentucky
- Inactivated 1 December 1953 at Camp Breckinridge, Kentucky
- Activated 15 May 1954 at Fort Jackson, South Carolina
- Redesignated 1 July 1956 as the 321st Airborne Field Artillery Battalion
- Relieved 25 April 1957 from assignment to the 101st Airborne Division
- Reorganized and redesignated 31 July 1959 as the 321st Artillery, a parent regiment under the Combat Arms Regimental System
- Redesignated 1 September 1971 as the 321st Field Artillery
- Withdrawn 28 February 1987 from the Combat Arms Regimental System, reorganized under the United States Army Regimental System, and transferred to the United States Army Training and Doctrine Command
- Withdrawn 15 January 1996 from the United States Army Training and Doctrine Command
- Redesignated 1 October 2005 as the 321st Field Artillery Regiment

=== Campaign participation credit ===
- World War I: St. Mihiel, Meuse-Argonne, Lorraine 1918
- World War II: Normandy (with arrowhead); Rhineland (with arrowhead); Ardennes-Alsace; Central Europe
- Vietnam: Counteroffensive, Phase III; Tet Counteroffensive; Counteroffensive, Phase IV; Counteroffensive, Phase V; Counteroffensive, Phase VI; Tet 69/Counteroffensive; Summer-Fall 1969; Winter-Spring 1970; Sanctuary Counteroffensive; Counteroffensive, Phase VII; Consolidation I; Consolidation II
- Armed Forces Expeditions: Dominican Republic
- War on Terrorism:
  - Afghanistan:
  - Iraq: Iraqi Governance;

(Additional campaigns to be determined)

=== Decorations ===
- Presidential Unit Citation (Army), Streamer embroidered BASTOGNE
- French Croix de Guerre with Palm, World War II, Streamer embroidered NORMANDY
- Netherlands Orange Lanyard
- Belgian Fourragere 1940
  - Cited in the Order of the Day of the Belgian Army for action in France and Belgium
  - Belgian Croix de Guerre 1940 with Palm, Streamer embroidered BASTOGNE; cited in the Order of the Day of the Belgian Army for action at Bastogne
- Republic of Vietnam Cross of Gallantry with Palm, Streamer embroidered VIETNAM 1968
- Republic of Vietnam Cross of Gallantry with Palm, Streamer embroidered VIETNAM 1968–1969
- Republic of Vietnam Cross of Gallantry with Palm, Streamer embroidered VIETNAM 1971

== Heraldry ==
=== Distinctive unit insignia ===
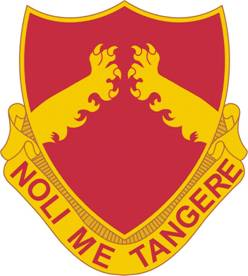

- Description

A Gold color metal and enamel device 1 1/8 inches (2.9 cm) in height overall consisting of a shield blazoned: Gules, two lion's paws issuing out of the dexter and sinister base points chevron-ways Or. Attached below and to the sides of the shield a Gold scroll inscribed "NOLI ME TANGERE" in Red letters.

- Symbolism

The shield is scarlet for Artillery. The lion's paws are significant of Field Artillery, which may be likened to a mountain lion whose paw has great strength and power in felling and crushing a victim.

- Background

The distinctive unit insignia was originally approved for the 452d Field Artillery Regiment on 1 February 1927. It was redesignated for the 321st Field Artillery Regiment on 21 November 1930. It was redesignated for the 321st Field Artillery Battalion on 15 April 1942. It was redesignated for the 321st Glider Field Artillery Battalion on 14 October 1942. It was redesignated for the 518th Airborne Field Artillery Battalion on 26 September 1951. The insignia was redesignated for the 321st Airborne Field Artillery Battalion on 31 July 1956. On 25 February 1958, it was redesignated for the 321st Artillery Regiment. The insignia was redesignated for the 321st Field Artillery Regiment effective 1 September 1971.

=== Coat of arms ===
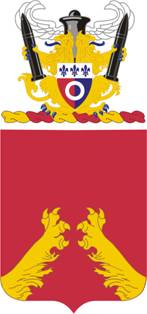

==== Blazon ====
- Shield

Gules, two lion's paws issuing out of the dexter an sinister base points chevron-ways Or.

- Crest

On a wreath Or and Gules, a cannon barrel palewise Sable winged Argent behind a lion sejant affronté with two heads addorsed of the first armed and langued Azure grasping in each forepaw a round of the third and surmounted by an escutcheon per pale Gules and of the fifth an annulet Argent, on a chief of the like three fleurs-de-lis Azure. Motto NOLI ME TANGERE (TOUCH-ME-NOT).

==== Symbolism ====
- Shield

The shield is scarlet for Artillery. The lion's paws are significant of Field Artillery, which may be likened to a mountain lion whose paw has great strength and power in felling and crushing a victim.

- Crest

The lion with one head facing forward and the other backward, brandishing a round in both directions, refers to the organization's claim to have been the unit of the 101st Airborne Division to fire the first and the last rounds on German soil. The winged cannon stands for the former designation of the organization as a Glider Field Artillery Battalion and its assignment during World War II to the 101st Airborne Division. The red and blue escutcheon is from the arms of Bastogne; the annulet represents the enemy encirclement of that objective and refers to the unit's distinguished action in its defense during World War II. The three fleurs-de-lis stand for the organization's first war service, i.e., participation in three campaigns in France during World War I.

==== Background ====
The coat of arms was originally approved for the 452d Field Artillery Regiment on 1 February 1927. It was redesignated for the 321st Field Artillery Regiment on 14 November 1930. It was redesignated for the 321st Field Artillery Battalion on 14 April 1942. It was redesignated for the 321st Glider Field Artillery Battalion on 14 October 1942. It was redesignated for the 518th Airborne Field Artillery Battalion and amended to delete the Organized Reserves crest on 26 September 1951. The insignia was redesignated for the 321st Airborne Field Artillery Battalion on 31 July 1956. On 25 February 1958, it was redesignated for the 321st Artillery Regiment. It was amended to add a crest on 22 April 1966. The insignia was redesignated for the 321st Field Artillery Regiment effective 1 September 1971.

== See also ==
- Field Artillery Branch (United States)
