= 487th Training Squadron =

487th Training Squadron Formerly 487th Bombardment Squadron

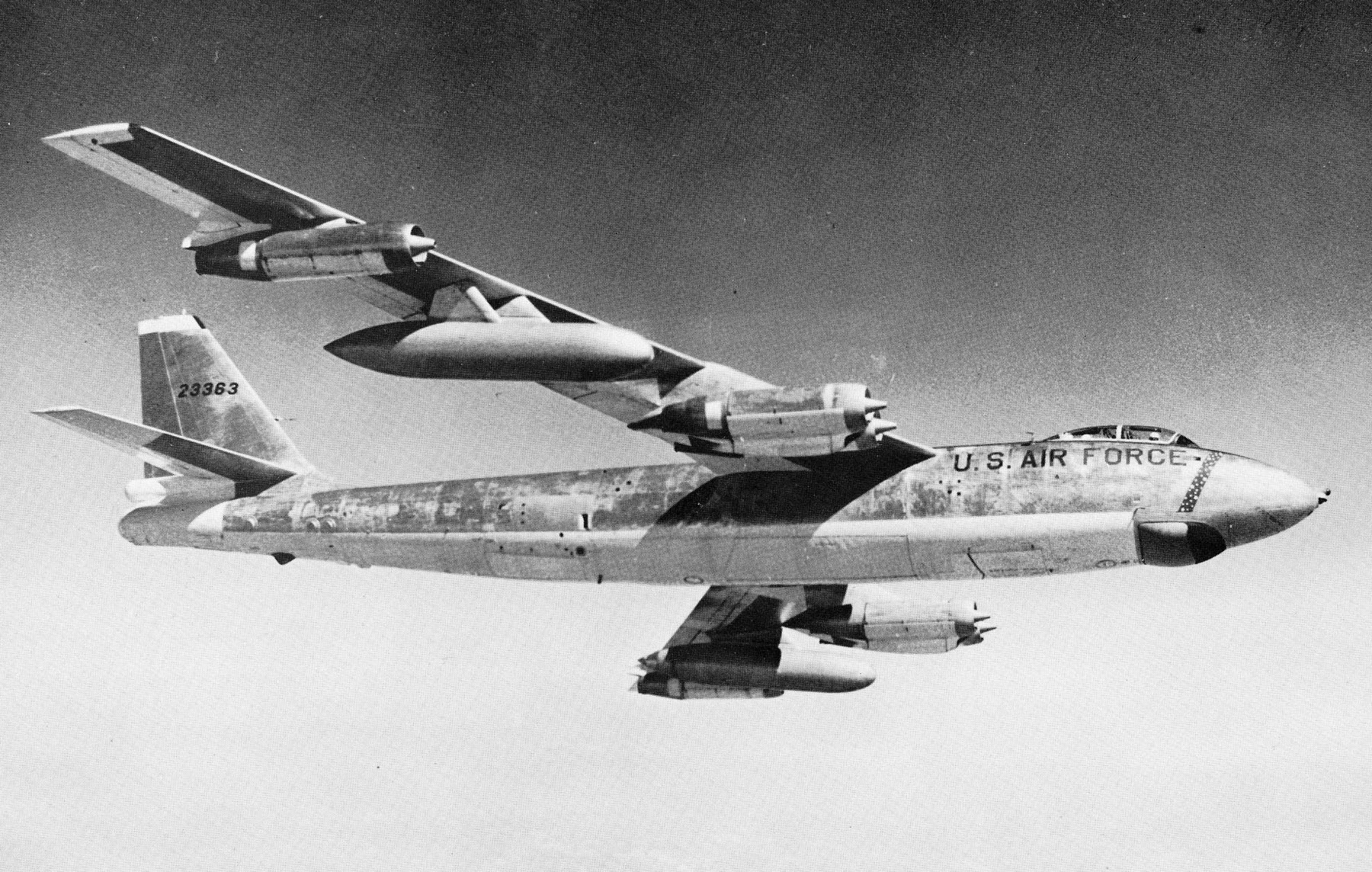
- B-47 Stratojet, last plane flown by the squadron
- Active: 1942–1945; 1947–1949; 1952–1963; 2024–present
- Country: United States
- Branch: United States Air Force
- Role: Flying training support
- Nickname: Knights
- Engagements: Mediterranean Theater of Operations
- Decorations: Distinguished Unit Citation

Insignia
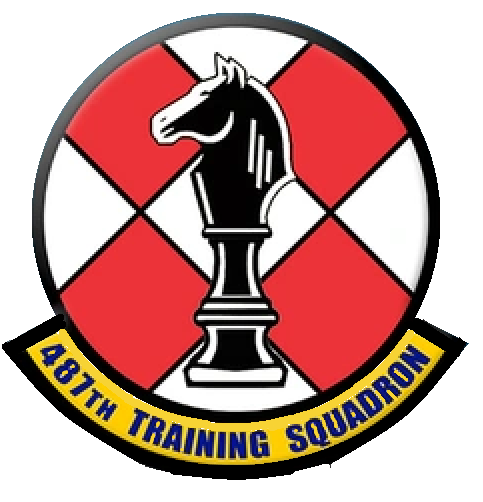
- 487th Training Squadron emblem

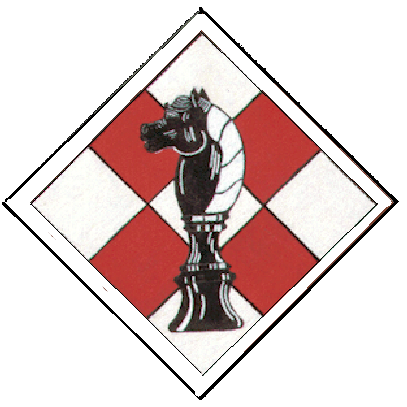
- 487th Bombardment Squadron emblem (Note: Approved 15 May 1959. Description: On a white diamond-shaped background edged black, a red and white checkerboard of nine squadres, five white, and four red surmounted by a black chess knight in profile, highlights and details white; the checkerboard edged black.)

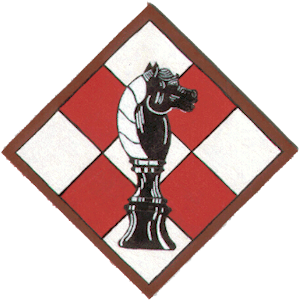
- 487th Bombardment Squadron emblem (World War II)

The 487th Training Squadron is an active United States Air Force unit. It is assigned to the 340th Flying Training Group at Joint Base San Antonio-Randolph, Texas.

The squadron was first activated during World War II as the 487th Bombardment Squadron. After training in the United States, it deployed to the Mediterranean Theater of Operations, where it flew North American B-25 Mitchell medium bombers, primarily on air support and air interdiction missions, earning a Distinguished Unit Citation for its actions. After V-E Day, the squadron returned to the United States, where it was inactivated in November 1945.

The group was again active in the reserve from 1947 to 1949, but does not appear to have been fully manned or equipped with operational aircraft during this period. It was again activated in October 1952, as the Air Force reopened Sedalia Air Force Base, Missouri. It flew Boeing B-47 Stratojets at Sedalia (later Whiteman Air Force Base) until September 1963, as the B-47 began to be withdrawn from Strategic Air Command operations. It was inactivated with the withdrawal of its Stratojets.

The squadron was renamed as a training unit and activated at Joint Base San Antonio-Randolph on 25 December 2024.

== Mission ==
The squadron's mission is to maintain administrative control for all Air Force Reserve Command initial aircrew training students including pilots, combat systems officers, air battle managers, career enlisted aviators, and remotely piloted aircraft pilots.

== History ==
=== World War II ===
==== Initial organization and training ====
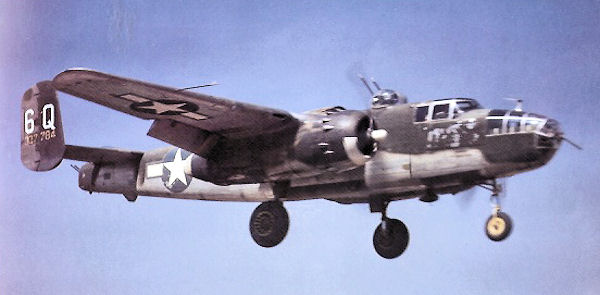
340th Bombardment Group B-25 approaching Alesan Airfield Corsica early 1944

The squadron was first activated at Columbia Army Air Base, South Carolina on 20 August 1942 as one of the four original squadrons of the 340th Bombardment Group. However, it was not until September that the squadron received its initial cadre, mostly drawn from the 309th Bombardment Group. It completed Phase I and Phase II training (Note: Phase I training concentrated on individual training in crewmember specialties. Phase II training emphasized the coordination for the crew to act as a team. The final phase concentrated on operation as a unit. Greer, p. 606.) at Columbia with North American B-25 Mitchells, then moved to Walterboro Army Air Field, South Carolina in November, where it completed Phase III training and departed for the Mediterranean Theater of Operations at the end of January 1943.

The squadron's ground echelon travelled by train to Camp Stoneman, California, where it boarded the USS West Point (AP-23) for the combat zone via the Pacific and Indian Oceans. The air echelon travelled by train to Kellogg Field, Michigan, where it received new B-25s to ferry across the Atlantic. It departed Morrison Field, Florida on 25 February 1943.

==== Combat operations ====
The squadron arrived at its first combat base, RAF Kabrit, Egypt in March 1943, with the air echelon arriving between 10 and 20 March and the ground echelon on 29 March. It began combat operations from Medenine Airfield, Tunisia in April, where the 340th Group flew its initial seven missions with the 12th Bombardment Group. Shortly thereafter it moved to Sfax Airfield, Tunisia and began operations on its own. The 487th engaged primarily in air support and interdiction operations, targeting airfields, roads, bridges, road junctions, supply depots and marshalling yards. It participated in Operation Corkscrew, the reduction of defenses in Pantelleria and Lampedusa in June 1943. Although the squadron's operations were hindered by primitive living conditions at its base and unfavorable weather, the squadron supported the British Eighth Army in Tunisia and Allied forces in Operation Husky, the invasion of Sicily. For these actions, it was awarded a Distinguished Unit Citation (DUC).

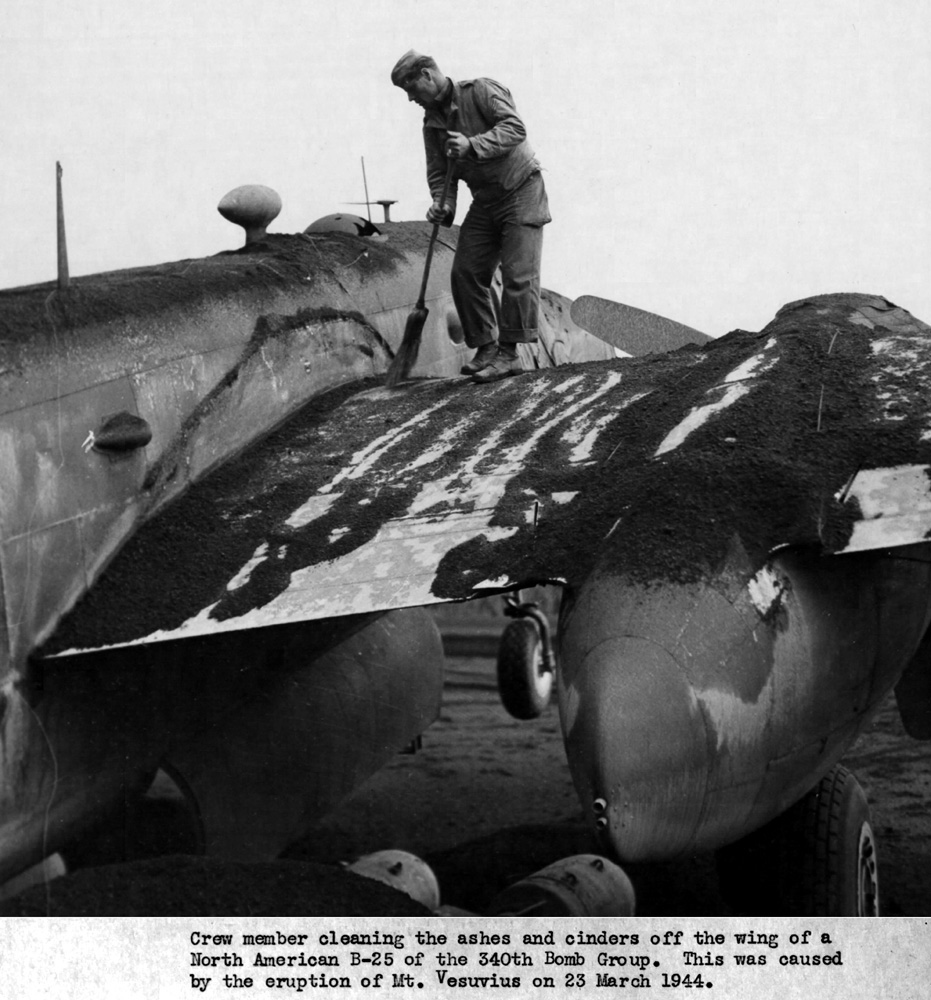
340th Group B-25 Mitchell covered with ash from Mount Vesuvius

As the Germans retreated from Sicily, the squadron attacked their evacuation beaches near Messina the following month. In September, it supported Operation Avalanche, the invasion of Italy near Salerno. During the first six months of 1944, it provided air support for the Allied drive on Rome. In March 1944, Mount Vesuvius erupted, covering 340th Group aircraft at Pompeii Airfield with volcanic ash. As a result, the squadron was forced to move to Gaudo Airfield. (Note: 88 of the 340th Group's Mitchells were destroyed at Pompeii by the eruption.) In April, it moved to Alesan Airfield, on Corsica.

The squadron sometimes bombed strategic targets as well. It operated against factories in Albania, Austria, Bulgaria, France, Greece, Italy, Tunisia and Yugoslavia. After September 1944, these targets included German lines of communication, particularly in the Alps, where it conducted raids on targets in the Brenner Pass. It also engaged in psychological warfare operations, dropping propaganda leaflets behind enemy lines.

Just prior to V-E Day, the squadron returned to Italy, leaving for the United States in July 1945. The air echelon ferried its Mitchells, turning them in upon arrival in the United States. It arrived at Seymour Johnson Field, North Carolina in August, although its personnel were granted leave and the squadron only began to reassemble in September. It returned to Columbia in October, but was inactivated in November.

=== Air Force reserve ===
The 487th Bombardment Squadron was reactivated as a reserve unit under Air Defense Command (ADC) at Tulsa Municipal Airport, Oklahoma on 31 October 1947. It is not clear if the squadron was fully staffed or equipped with operational aircraft. In 1948 Continental Air Command assumed responsibility for managing air reserve and Air National Guard units from ADC. President Truman’s reduced 1949 defense budget required reductions in the number of units in the Air Force, and the 487th was inactivated in August 1949 and not replaced as reserve flying operations at the Tulsa airport ceased.

=== Strategic Air Command operations ===
In July 1951, Strategic Air Command (SAC) reopened Sedalia Air Force Base, Missouri, which had served as an air transport base during World War II. On 1 August, it activated the 4224th Air Base Squadron to expand the field to accommodate strategic bombers, and on 1 October 1952, the 340th Bombardment Wing, including the 487th Squadron, was activated to replace the 4224th. However, the wing initially concentrated is activities on bringing Sedalia to operational status and the squadron was only nominally manned, and did not become operational until 1954, when it began to receive Boeing B-47 Stratojets.

From 13 September to 3 November 1955, the squadron deployed to the United Kingdom along with the other operational elements of the 340th Wing, which was attached to SAC's 7th Air Division. Starting in 1957, deployments of entire wings was replaced by Operation Reflex, which placed Stratojets and Boeing KC-97s on alert at bases closer to the Soviet Union for 90 day periods, although individuals rotated back to home bases during unit Reflex deployments After 1958, SAC's Stratojet units began to assume an alert posture at their home bases, reducing the amount of time spent on alert at overseas bases. General Thomas S. Power’s initial goal was to maintain one third of SAC's planes on fifteen minute ground alert, fully fueled and ready for combat to reduce vulnerability to a Soviet missile strike. The SAC alert commitment was increased to half the squadron's aircraft in 1962.

Soon after detection of Soviet missiles in Cuba, SAC brought all degraded and adjusted alert sorties up to full capability. It dispersed its B-47s on 22 October 1962. Most dispersal bases were civilian airfields with Air Force Reserve or Air National Guard units. B-47s were configured for execution of the Emergency War Order as soon as possible after dispersal. On 15 November 1/6 of the dispersed B-47s were recalled to their home bases. On 21 November SAC went to DEFCON 3. Dispersed B-47s and supporting tankers were recalled on 24 November. On 27 November SAC returned to normal alert posture.

In the summer of 1963, the squadron began phasing down its operations at what was now Whiteman Air Force Base in preparation for Whiteman becoming a base for LGM-30 Minuteman intercontinental ballistic missiles and the transfer of the base to the 351st Strategic Missile Wing. The squadron was inactivated on 1 September 1963

=== Flying training ===
The squadron was redesignated the 487th Training Squadron and activated on 25 December 2024. Its activation was marked in a ceremony at Joint Base San Antonio-Randolph on 24 January 2025. Its mission of supporting reserve flight trainees had been performed by a staff section within the 340th Flying Training Group since 2015. That section typically supported 350 students annually from completion of Officer Training School or Basic Military Training until they complete flying training, a process that typically lasts two years.

== Lineage ==
- Constituted as the 487th Bombardment Squadron (Medium) on 10 August 1942

Activated on 20 August 1942
Redesignated 487th Bombardment Squadron, Medium om 1 July 1943
Inactivated on 7 November 1945

- Redesignated 487th Bombardment Squadron, Light on 8 October 1947

Activated in the reserve on 31 October 1947
Inactivated on 19 August 1949

- Redesignated 487th Bombardment Squadron, Medium on 3 October 1952

Activated on 20 October 1952
Inactivated on 1 September 1963

- Redesignated 487th Training Squadron on 25 November 2024

Activated on 25 December 2024

=== Assignments ===
- 340th Bombardment Group, 20 August 1942 – 7 November 1945
- 340th Bombardment Group, 31 October 1947 – 19 August 1949
- 340th Bombardment Wing, 20 October 1952 – 1 September 1963
- 340th Flying Training Group, 24 December 2024 – present

=== Stations ===
- Columbia Army Air Base, South Carolina, 20 August 1942
- Walterboro Army Air Field, South Carolina 30 November 1942 – 29 January 1943
- RAF Kabrit, Egypt 29 March 1943
- Medenine Airfield, Tunisia c. 11 April 1943
- Sfax Airfield, Tunisia 17 April 1943
- Hergla Airfield, Tunisia 3 June 1943
- Comiso Airfield, Sicily 3 August 1943
- Catania Airport, Sicily 27 August 1943
- San Pancrazio Airfield, Italy 29 October 1943
- Salsola Airfield (Foggia Satellite III), Italy 26 November 1943
- Pompeii Airfield, Italy 28 December 1943
- Gaudo Airfield, Italy 24 March 1944
- Alesan Airfield, Corsica, France c. 15 April 1944
- Rimini Airfield, Italy 7 April – c. 16 July 1945
- Seymour Johnson Field, North Carolina 9 August 1945
- Columbia Army Air Base, South Carolina 2 October – 7 November 1945
- Tulsa Municipal Airport, Oklahoma, 31 October 1947 – 19 August 1949
- Sedalia Air Force Base (later Whiteman Air Force Base), Missouri, 20 October 1952 – 1 September 1963
- Joint Base San Antonio-Randolph, 25 December 2024 – present

=== Aircraft ===
- North American B-25 Mitchell, 1942–1945
- Boeing B-47 Stratojet, 1955–1963

=== Awards and campaigns ===
Award streamer	Award	Dates	Notes
	Distinguished Unit Citation	c. 11 April 1943–17 August 1943	487th Bombardment Squadron, North Africa and Sicily (Note: AF Pamphlet 900-2 lists a second award on 23 September 1944. On this date, the 340th Bombardment Group and two of its squadrons earned a DUC for action at the heavily defended harbor of La Spezia. However, the squadron did not participate in this action. Maurer, Combat Squadrons, p. 585, Musser, Factsheet.)

Campaign Streamer	Campaign	Dates	Notes
	Tunisia	c. 12 April 1943 – 13 May 1943	487th Bombardment Squadron
	Sicily	14 May 1943 – 17 August 1943	487th Bombardment Squadron
	Naples-Foggia	18 August 1943 – 21 January 1944	487th Bombardment Squadron
	Anzio	22 January 1944 – 24 May 1944	487th Bombardment Squadron
	Rome-Arno	22 January 1944 – 9 September 1944	487th Bombardment Squadron
	Southern France	15 August 1944 – 14 September 1944	487th Bombardment Squadron
	North Apennines	10 September 1944 – 4 April 1945	487th Bombardment Squadron
	Po Valley	3 April 1945 – 8 May 1945	487th Bombardment Squadron
	Air Combat, EAME Theater	c. 12 April 1943 – 11 May 1945	487th Bombardment Squadron

== See also ==
- List of B-47 units of the United States Air Force
- List of North African airfields during World War II
