= 486th Bombardment Squadron =

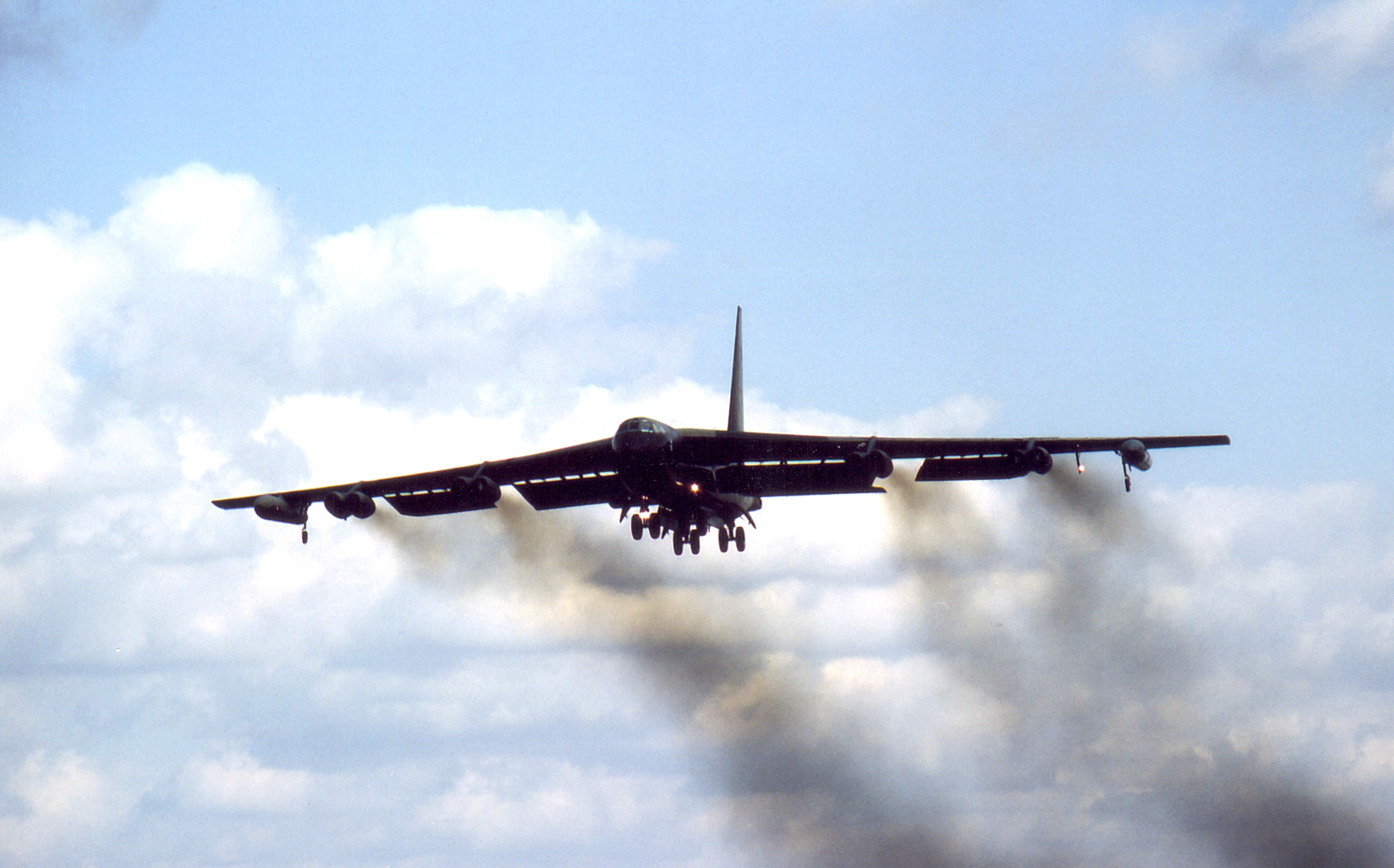
- B-52D Stratofortress as flown by the squadron
- Active: 1942–1945; 1947–1949; 1952–1971
- Country: United States
- Branch: United States Air Force
- Role: Heavy bomber
- Engagements: Mediterranean Theater of Operations
- Decorations: Distinguished Unit Citation; Air Force Outstanding Unit Award

Insignia
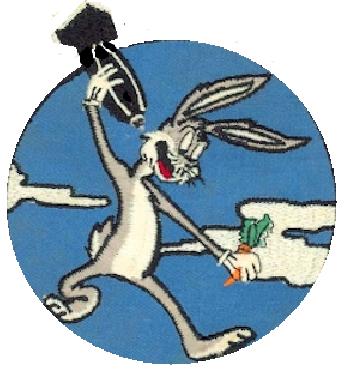
- 486th Bombardment Squadron emblem (Note: Approved 26 August 1943. Description: Over and through a light blue-gray disc, flecked with white clouds, BUGS BUNNY proper, holding a carrot in left forepaw and hurling a black, white and gray aerial bomb held aloft in right forepaw.)
- World War II tail marking: 6, followed by letter for individual airplane

The 486th Bombardment Squadron is an inactive United States Air Force unit. It was last assigned to the 22d Bombardment Wing at March Air Force Base, California, where it was inactivated on 1 July 1971. (Note: The squadron is not related to the 486th Bombardment Squadron that was active in the Organized Reserve at Schoen Field, Indiana from 1925 to 1930 and was disbanded on 31 May 1942, or to the Bombardment Squadron, Provisional, 486th that was active from 1972 to 1973 at Anderson Air Force Base, Guam.)

The squadron was activated in 1942 and trained with North American B-25 Mitchells in the United States before deploying to the Mediterranean Theater of Operations in early 1943. It flew combat missions in the Mediterranean until 1945, earning a Distinguished Unit Citation for its actions. Following V-E Day, the squadron returned to the United States, where it was inactivated.

The squadron was activated again in the Air Force Reserve in 1947, but does not appear to have been fully manned or equipped during this period. It was inactivated two years later as a result of Defense budget reductions.

The squadron was reactivated in 1952 as a Strategic Air Command bomber unit flying Boeing B-47 Stratojets. It was put on full alert at dispersed bases in 1962 for the Cuban Missile Crisis. In 1963, it moved to assume the personnel and Boeing B-52 Stratofortresses of another unit. While flying the "BUFF", the squadron deployed personnel and bombers to participate in the Vietnam War until it was inactivated in 1971 as older models of the B-52 were being phased out of active service.

== History ==
=== World War II ===
==== Initial organization and training ====
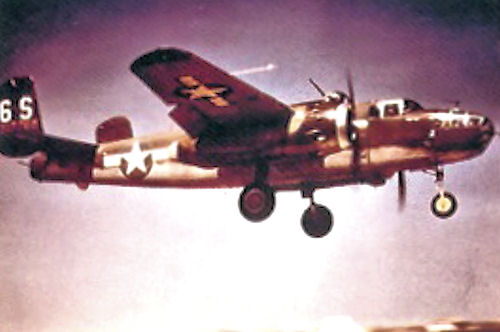
Squadron Mitchell on approach to Rimini Airfield, Italy in early 1945. (Note: Aircraft is North American B-25J-1-NC, serial 43-2770. This aircraft was lost on 4 November 1944. Missing Air Crew Report 10778. Dirkx, Marco (21 June 2024). "1943 USAF Serial Numbers". Joe Baugher’s Serial Number List.)

The squadron was first activated at Columbia Army Air Base, South Carolina on 20 August 1942 as one of the four original squadrons of the 340th Bombardment Group. However, it was not until September that the squadron received its initial cadre, mostly drawn from the 309th Bombardment Group. By the end of September, it had nearly 200 assigned personnel, but it was only in November that it was fully manned. It completed Phase I and Phase II training (Note: Phase I training concentrated on individual training in crewmember specialties. Phase II training emphasized the coordination for the crew to act as a team. The final phase concentrated on operation as a unit. Greer, p. 606.) at Columbia with North American B-25 Mitchells, then moved to Walterboro Army Air Field, South Carolina in November, where it completed Phase III training and departed for the Mediterranean Theater of Operations at the end of January 1943.

The squadron's ground echelon travelled by train to Camp Stoneman, California, where it boarded the USS West Point (AP-23) for the combat zone via the Pacific and Indian Oceans. The air echelon travelled by train to Kellogg Field, Michigan, where it received new B-25s to ferry across the Atlantic. It departed Morrison Field, Florida on 25 February 1943.

==== Combat operations ====
The squadron arrived at its first combat base, RAF Kabrit, Egypt in March 1943, with the air echelon arriving between 10 and 20 March and the ground echelon on 29 March. It began combat operations from Medenine Airfield, Tunisia in April, where the 340th Group flew its initial seven missions with the 12th Bombardment Group. Shortly thereafter it moved to Sfax Airfield, Tunisia and began operations on its own. The 486th engaged primarily in air support and interdiction operations, targeting airfields, roads, bridges, road junctions, supply depots and marshalling yards. It participated in Operation Corkscrew, the reduction of defenses in Pantelleria and Lampedusa in June 1943. Although the squadron's operations were hindered by primitive living conditions at its base and unfavorable weather, the squadron supported the British Eighth Army in Tunisia and Allied forces in Operation Husky, the invasion of Sicily. For these actions, it was awarded a Distinguished Unit Citation (DUC).

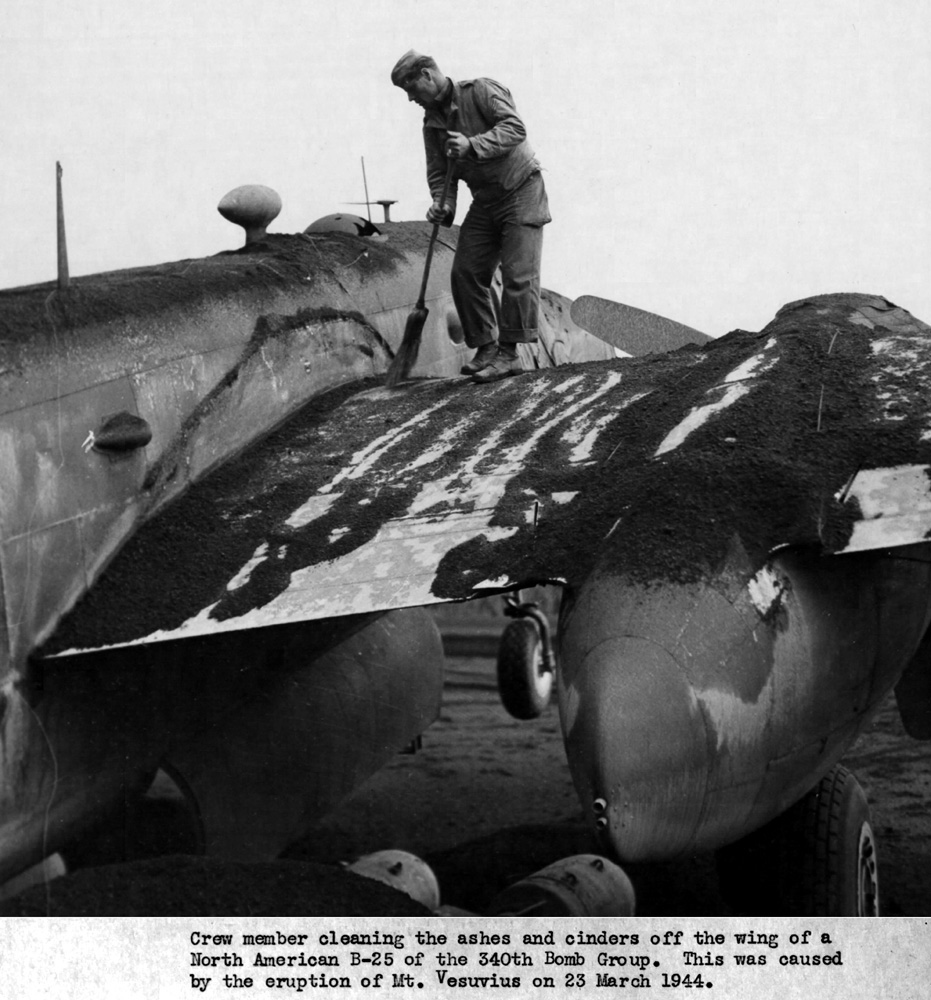
340th Group B-25 Mitchell covered with ash from Mount Vesuvius

As the Germans evacuated from Sicily, it attacked their evacuation beaches near Messina the following month. In September, it supported Operation Avalanche, the invasion of Italy near Salerno. During the first six months of 1944, it provided air support for the Allied drive on Rome. In March 1944, Mount Vesuvius erupted, covering 340th Group aircraft at Pompeii Airfield with volcanic ash. As a result, the squadron was forced to move to Gaudo Airfield. (Note: 88 of the 340th Group's Mitchells were destroyed at Pompeii by the eruption.) In April, it moved to Alesani Airfield, on Corsica.

The squadron sometimes bombed strategic targets as well. It operated against factories in Albania, Austria, Bulgaria, France, Greece, Italy (including Sicily), Tunisia and Yugoslavia. After September 1944, these targets included German lines of communication, particularly in the Alps, where it conducted raids on targets in the Brenner Pass. It also engaged in psychological warfare operations, dropping propaganda leaflets behind enemy lines.

Just prior to V-E Day, the squadron returned to Italy, leaving for the United States in July 1945. It arrived in August, but was inactivated in November.

=== Air Force reserve ===
The 486th Bombardment Squadron was reactivated as a reserve unit under Air Defense Command (ADC) at Tulsa Municipal Airport, Oklahoma on 31 October 1947. It is not clear whether or not the squadron was fully staffed or equipped with operational aircraft. In 1948 Continental Air Command assumed responsibility for managing air reserve and Air National Guard units from ADC. President Truman’s reduced 1949 defense budget required reductions in the number of units in the Air Force, and the 486th was inactivated in August 1949 and not replaced as reserve flying operations at the Tulsa airport ceased.

=== Strategic Air Command ===
==== B-47 Operations ====
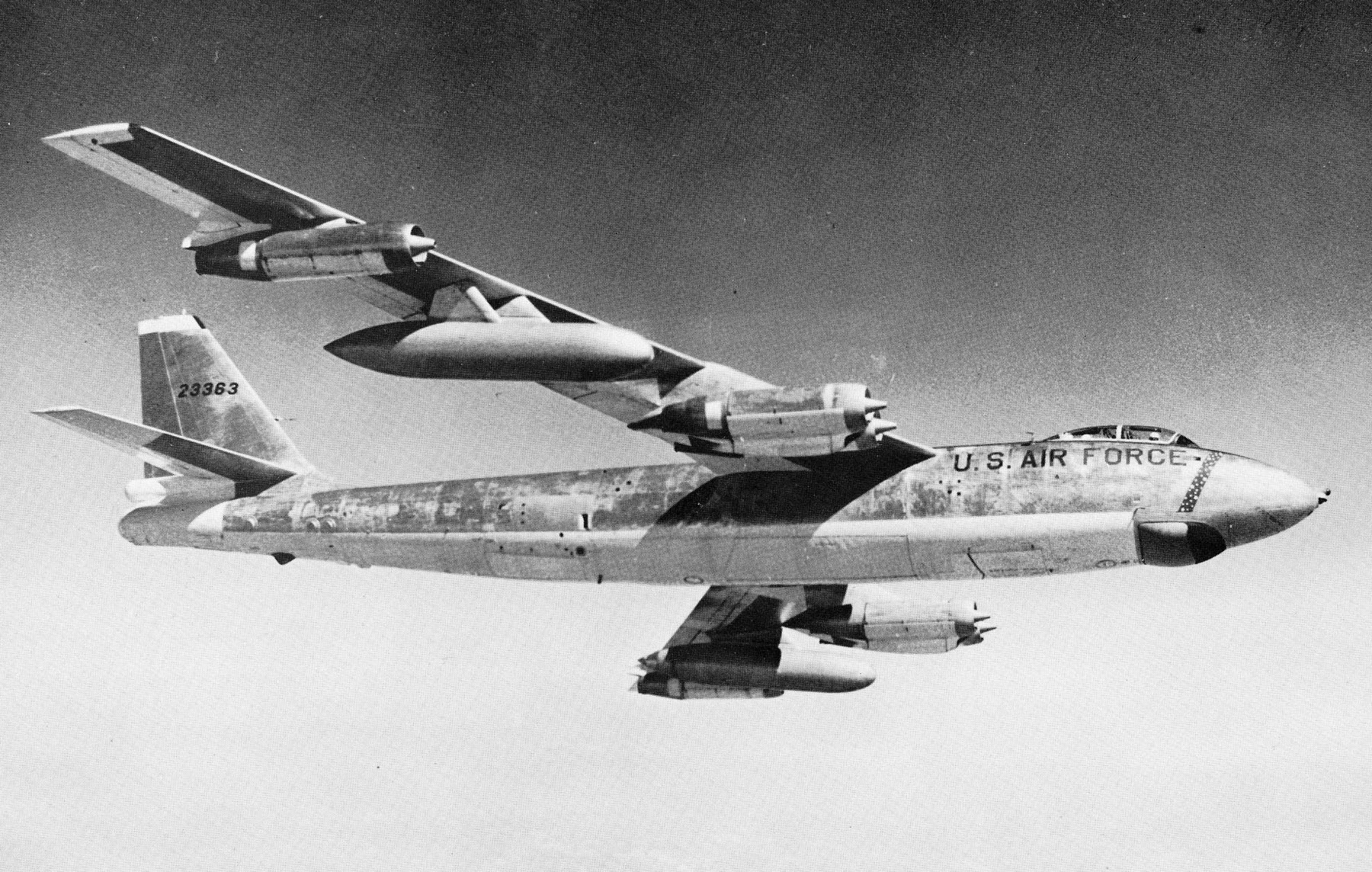
B47E Stratojet in flight

In July 1951, Strategic Air Command (SAC) reopened Sedalia Air Force Base, Missouri, which had served as an air transport base during World War II. On 1 August, it activated the 4224th Air Base Squadron to expand the field to accommodate strategic bombers, and on 1 October 1952, the 340th Bombardment Wing, including the 486th Squadron, was activated to replace the 4224th. However, the wing concentrated is activities on bringing Sedalia to operational status and the squadron was only nominally manned, and did not become operational until 1954, when it began to receive Boeing B-47 Stratojets.

From 13 September to 3 November 1955, the squadron deployed to the United Kingdom along with the other operational elements of the 340th Wing, which was attached to SAC's 7th Air Division. Starting in 1957, deployments of entire wings was replaced by Operation Reflex, which placed Stratojets and Boeing KC-97s on alert at bases closer to the Soviet Union for 90 day periods, although individuals rotated back to home bases during unit Reflex deployments. After 1958, SAC's Stratojet units began to assume an alert posture at their home bases, reducing the amount of time spent on alert at overseas bases. General Thomas S. Power’s initial goal was to maintain one third of SAC's planes on fifteen minute ground alert, fully fueled and ready for combat to reduce vulnerability to a Soviet missile strike. The SAC alert commitment was increased to half the squadron's aircraft in 1962.

Soon after detection of Soviet missiles in Cuba, SAC brought all degraded and adjusted alert sorties up to full capability. It dispersed its B-47s on 22 October 1962. Most dispersal bases were civilian airfields with Air Force Reserve or Air National Guard units. B-47s were configured for execution of the Emergency War Order as soon as possible after dispersal. On 15 November 1/6 of the dispersed B-47s were recalled to their home bases. On 21 November SAC went to DEFCON 3. Dispersed B-47s and supporting tankers were recalled on 24 November. On 27 November SAC returned to normal alert posture.

In the summer of 1963, the squadron began phasing down its operations at what was now Whiteman Air Force Base in preparation for Whiteman becoming a base for LGM-30 Minuteman intercontinental ballistic missiles and the transfer of the base to the 351st Strategic Missile Wing.

==== B-52 Operations ====
On 1 September 1963, the squadron moved on paper to Bergstrom Air Force Base, Texas, where it assumed the mission, personnel and Boeing B-52D Stratofortresses of the 335th Bombardment Squadron, which was simultaneously inactivated. At Bergstrom it conducted global operations and maintained bombers on alert.

The squadron moved to March Air Force Base, California in October 1966 as Bergstrom was transferred from SAC to Tactical Air Command. At March, it became part of the 22d Bombardment Wing. With the transfer, the 22nd became a "super wing" with two bombardment squadrons and two air refueling squadrons. From 10 March to early October 1967, all tactical resources of the 22nd Wing, including the 486th, were deployed to other SAC organizations to maintain operations over Southeast Asia. The squadron continued to deploy resources and maintain some of its undeployed B-52s on alert. In December 1965, a few months after the first B-52Bs started leaving the operational inventory, Robert S. McNamara, Secretary of Defense, ordered another reduction of SAC’s bomber force. This program called for the mid-1971 retirement of all B-52Cs, and several subsequent B-52 models. As a result, the 486th was inactivated on 1 July 1971.

=== Lineage ===
- Constituted as the 486th Bombardment Squadron (Medium) on 10 August 1942

Redesignated 486th Bombardment Squadron, Medium c. 20 August 1943
Activated on 20 August 1942
Inactivated on 7 November 1945

- Redesignated 486th Bombardment Squadron, Light on 8 October 1947

Activated in the reserve on 31 October 1947
Inactivated on 19 August 1949

- Redesignated 486th Bombardment Squadron, Medium on 3 October 1952

Activated on 20 October 1952

- Redesignated 486th Bombardment Squadron, Heavy on 1 September 1963

Inactivated on 1 July 1971

=== Assignments ===
- 340th Bombardment Group, 20 August 1942 – 7 November 1945
- 340th Bombardment Group, 31 October 1947 – 19 August 1949
- 340th Bombardment Wing, 20 October 1952
- 22d Bombardment Wing, 2 October 1966 – 1 July 1971

=== Stations ===
- Columbia Army Air Base, South Carolina, 20 August 1942
- Walterboro Army Air Field, South Carolina 30 November 1942 – 30 January 1943
- RAF Kabrit (LG 213), Egypt c. 29 March 1943
- Medenine Airfield, Tunisia c. 11 April 1943
- Sfax Airfield, Tunisia 17 April 1943
- Hergla Airfield, Tunisia 3 June 1943
- Comiso Airfield, Sicily, Italy, 3 August 1943
- Catania Airport, Sicily, Italy, 27 August 1943
- San Pancrazio Airfield, Italy 25 October 1943
- Salsola Airfield (Foggia Satellite III), Italy 19 November 1943
- Pompeii Airfield, Italy 28 December 1943
- Gaudo Airfield, Italy 22 March 1944
- Alesani, Corsica, France, 15 April 1944
- Rimini Airfield, Italy 7 April – 16 July 1945
- Seymour Johnson Field, North Carolina 9 August 1945
- Columbia Army Air Base, South Carolina 2 October – 7 November 1945
- Tulsa Municipal Airport, Oklahoma, 31 October 1947 – 19 August 1949
- Sedalia Air Force Base (later Whiteman Air Force Base), Missouri, 20 October 1952
- Bergstrom Air Force Base, Texas, 1 September 1963
- March Air Force Base, California, 2 October 1966 – 1 July 1971

=== Aircraft ===
- North American B-25 Mitchell, 1942–1945
- Boeing B-47 Stratojet, 1954–1963
- Boeing B-52D Stratofortress, 1963–1971

=== Awards and campaigns ===
Award streamer	Award	Dates	Notes
	Distinguished Unit Citation	c. 11 April 1943–17 August 1943	North Africa and Sicily (Note: Maurer only lists the beginning date of the award as April. AF Pamphlet 900-2 lists a second award on 23 September 1944. On this date, the 340th Bombardment Group and two of its squadrons earned a DUC for action at the heavily defended harbor of La Spezia. However, the squadron did not participate in this action. Maurer, Combat Squadrons, p. 585, Musser, Factsheet.)
	Air Force Outstanding Unit Award	1 April 1967–1 October 1967 and 1 February 1968–1 March 1968	
	Air Force Outstanding Unit Award	25 March 1968–1 May 1968	

Campaign Streamer	Campaign	Dates	Notes
	Tunisia	c. 12 April 1943 – 13 May 1943	
	Sicily	14 May 1943 – 17 August 1943	
	Naples-Foggia	18 August 1943 – 21 January 1944	
	Anzio	22 January 1944 – 24 May 1944	
	Rome-Arno	22 January 1944 – 9 September 1944	
	Southern France	15 August 1944 – 14 September 1944	
	North Apennines	10 September 1944 – 4 April 1945	
	Po Valley	3 April 1945 – 8 May 1945	
	Air Combat, EAME Theater	c. 12 April 1943 – 11 May 1945	

== See also ==
- List of B-52 Units of the United States Air Force
- List of B-47 units of the United States Air Force
- List of North African airfields during World War II
