= 910th Air Refueling Squadron =

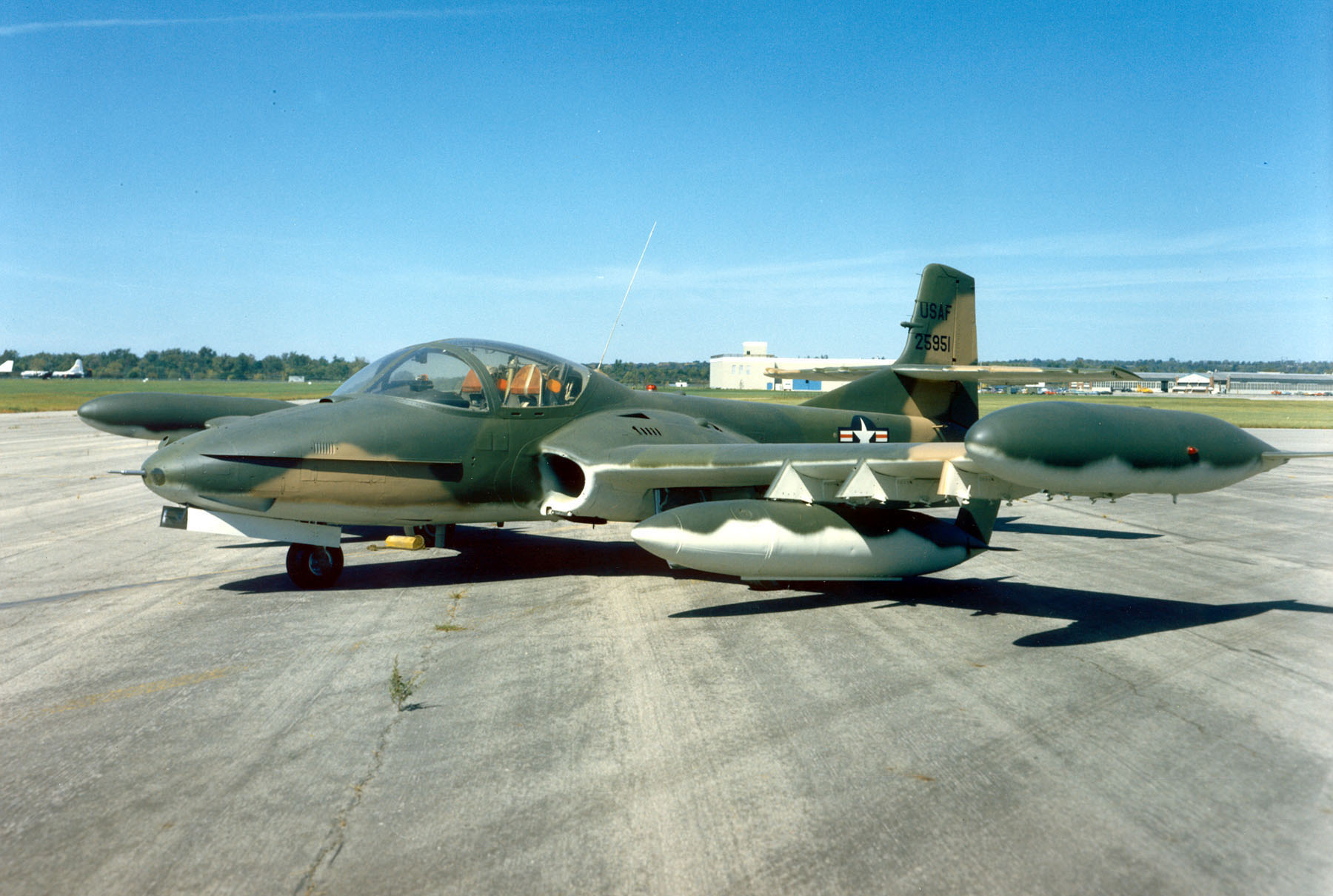
- Cessna A-37 Dragonfly as flown by the 310th Attack Squadron
- Active: 1942–1946; 1958–1966; 1969
- Country: United States
- Branch: United States Air Force
- Role: Air refueling
- Engagements: European Theater of World War II

Insignia
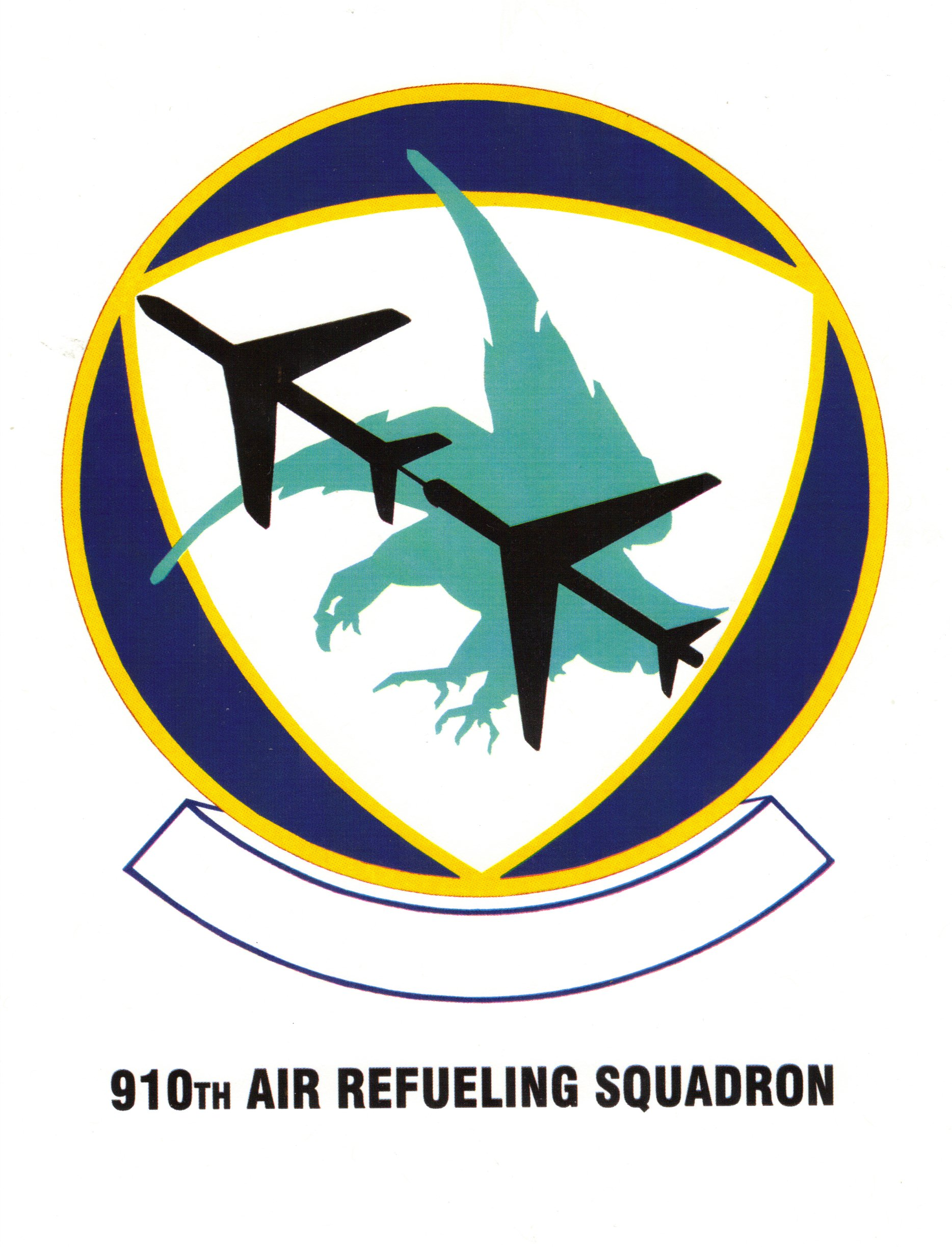
- 910th Air Refueling Squadron emblem
- World War II fuselage code: YC

The 910th Air Refueling Squadron is an inactive unit of the United States Air Force. In 1985, it was consolidated with the 10th Tactical Reconnaissance Squadron and the 310th Attack Squadron, but has not been active since consolidation.

The first predecessor of the squadron was activated in 1942 as the 10th Observation Squadron. The squadron performed antisubmarine patrols off the Pacific coast shortly after activating. As the 10th Tactical Reconnaissance Squadron, it briefly saw combat in the European Theater of World War II before returning to the United States for inactivation.

The 910th Air Refueling Squadron was a Strategic Air Command (SAC) unit that provided air refueling for SAC bombers from Bergstrom Air Force Base, Texas from 1958 to 1966, when SAC withdrew from Bergstrom and the squadron was inactivated.

The 310th Attack Squadron was activated at England Air Force Base, where it trained for deployment to Vietnam, in 1969. Shortly after it arrived at Bien Hoa Air Base it was inactivated and its personnel and equipment transferred to another unit.

== History ==
=== World War II ===
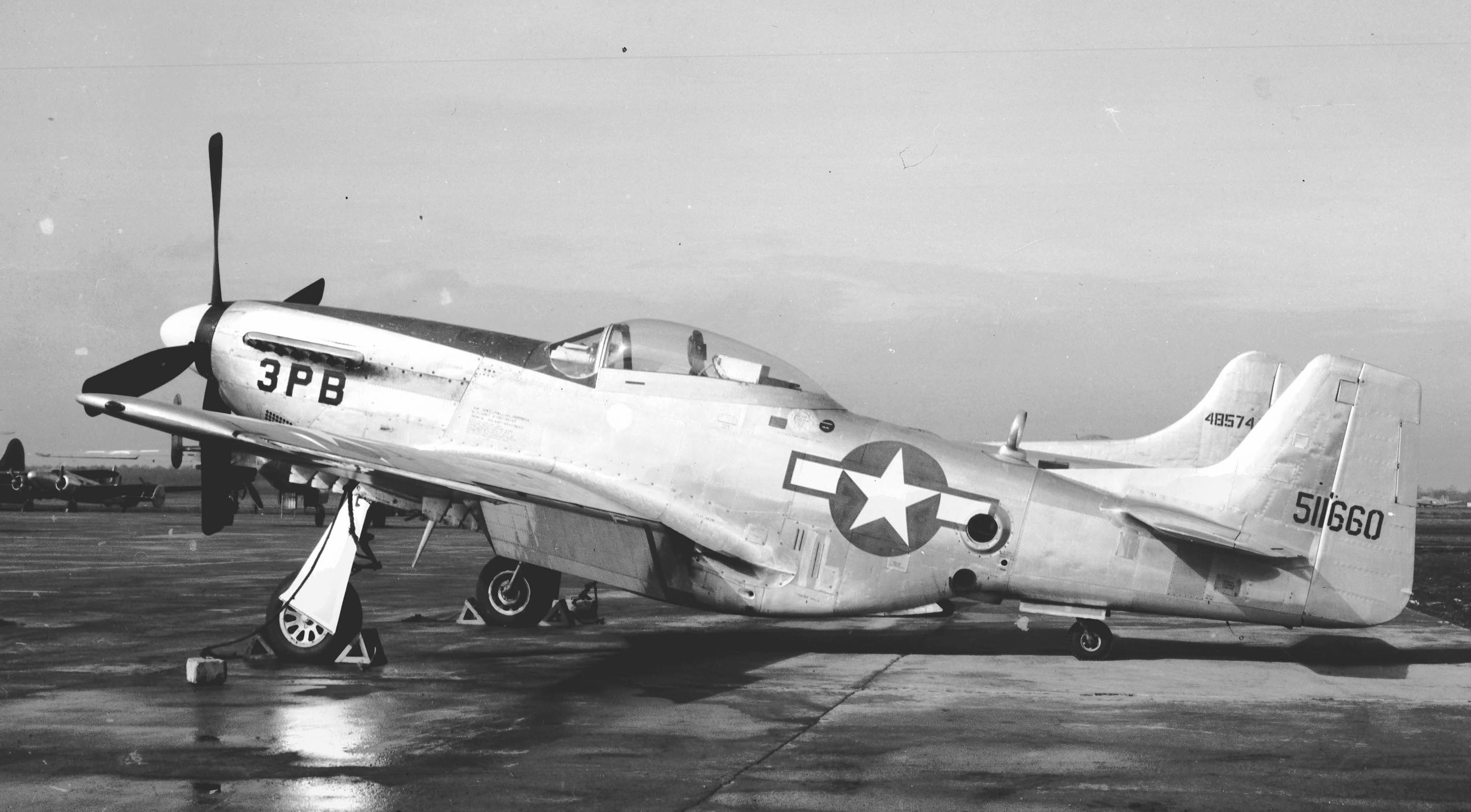
North American F-6D showing ports for cameras behind cockpit

The 10th Observation Squadron was activated in 1942 at Morrow Field, California, and assigned to the 69th Observation Group. From June through September of that year, it performed antisubmarine patrols off the Pacific coast. The unit engaged in air-ground training with a variety of aircraft from 1943 through 1944. It also participated in maneuvers in Louisiana. In December 1943, the squadron re-equipped with Bell P-39 Airacobra and Curtiss P-40 Warhawk fighter aircraft for reconnaissance.

In January 1945, it moved to Key Field, Mississippi, where it began training with North American F-6 Mustangs and prepared for overseas deployment. The next month it left Key Field for the New York Port of Embarkation and on 7 March sailed on the SS Marine Dragon. It landed at Le Havre, France, in the European Theater of Operations shortly before the surrender of Germany. The squadron joined Ninth Air Force in France. It saw combat for a short period, flying visual and photographic air reconnaissance missions to provide intelligence for air and ground units.

The squadron returned to the United States starting in July 1945. Soon after returning to Drew Field, Florida, in August 1945, it was stripped of its manpower and existed on paper only until it was inactivated in 1946.

=== Cold War ===
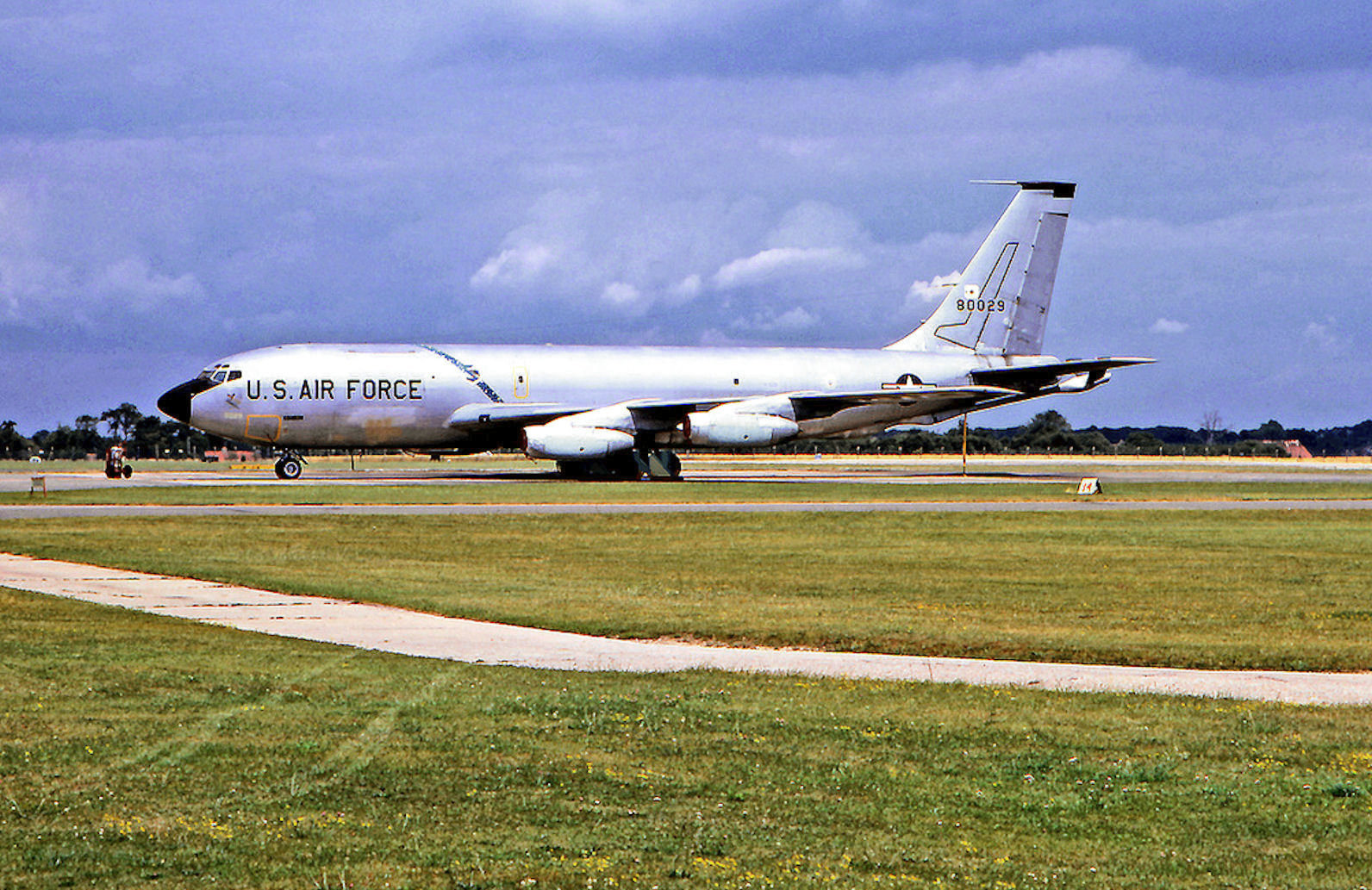
KC-135 as flown with SAC by the 910th Air Refueling Squadron

The 910th Air Refueling Squadron was established under Strategic Air Command (SAC) in the fall of 1958 at Bergstrom Air Force Base, Texas, where it was assigned to the 4130th Strategic Wing. The squadron's first Boeing KC-135 Stratotanker arrived on 17 January 1959. The 4130th wing was established by SAC in a program to disperse its Boeing B-52 Stratofortress bombers over a larger number of bases, thus making it more difficult for the Soviet Union to knock out the entire fleet with a surprise first strike. The squadron provided air refueling primarily to the B-52s of the 4130th wing. Starting in 1960, one-third of the squadron's aircraft were maintained on fifteen-minute alert, fully fueled and ready for combat to reduce vulnerability to a Soviet missile strike. This was increased to half the squadron's aircraft in 1962. In August 1960, a crew from the 910th placed first in SAC's combat crew competition.

In September 1963, the 340th Bombardment Wing assumed the aircraft, personnel, and equipment of the discontinued 4130th wing. The 4130th was a Major Command controlled (MAJCON) wing, which could not carry a permanent history or lineage, and SAC wanted to replace it with a permanent unit. The squadron transferred to the 340th wing as part of this reorganization.

The 910th deployed aircrews and airplanes to support the Young Tiger task force in Southeast Asia, providing air refueling to tactical aircraft engaged in combat operations. In the summer of 1966, the 340th wing began to wind down operations in preparation for inactivation and transfer of Bergstrom to Tactical Air Command, and the wing and squadron were inactivated in the fall.

=== War in Viet Nam ===
The 310th Attack Squadron was activated in the late spring of 1969 at England Air Force Base, Louisiana. It was originally assigned to the 1st Special Operations Wing, but transferred to the 4410th Special Operations Training Group, when that group replaced the 1st at England. After training with the Cessna A-37 Dragonfly it moved to Bien Hoa Air Base, Viet Nam, where it was assigned to the 3d Tactical Fighter Wing. Its aircraft were transported to Southeast Asia on Douglas C-133 Cargomasters. Shortly after arriving in theater, it was inactivated and its personnel and equipment were transferred to the 8th Attack Squadron.

In 1985 the three squadrons were consolidated into a single unit, but the consolidated unit has not been activated.

== Lineage ==
10th Tactical Reconnaissance Squadron

- Constituted as the 10th Observation Squadron (Medium) on 5 February 1942

Activated on 2 March 1942
Redesignated 10th Observation Squadron on 4 July 1942
Redesignated 10th Reconnaissance Squadron (Fighter) on 2 April 1943
Redesignated 10th Tactical Reconnaissance Squadron on 11 August 1943

- Inactivated on 31 March 1946
- Consolidated on 19 September 1958 with the 910th Air Refueling Squadron and the 310th Attack Squadron as the 910th Air Refueling Squadron

310th Attack Squadron

- Constituted as the 310th Attack Squadron on 5 May 1969

Activated c. 15 May 1969
Inactivated 15 December 1969

- Consolidated on 19 September 1958 with the 910th Air Refueling Squadron and the 10th Tactical Reconnaissance Squadron as the 910th Air Refueling Squadron

910th Air Refueling Squadron

- Constituted as the 910th Air Refueling Squadron, Heavy on 28 May 1958
- Activated on 15 October 1958
- Inactivated on 2 October 1966
- Consolidated on 19 September 1958 with the 10th Tactical Reconnaissance Squadron and the 310th Attack Squadron (remained inactive)

=== Assignments ===
- 69th Observation Group (later 69th Reconnaissance Group, 69th Tactical Reconnaissance Group, 69th Reconnaissance Group): 2 March 1942 – 31 March 1946
- 4130th Strategic Wing: 15 October 1958
- 340th Bombardment Wing: 1 September 1963 – 2 October 1966
- 1st Special Operations Wing: 15 May 1969
- 4410th Special Operations Training Group: 15 July 1969
- 3d Tactical Fighter Wing: 15 November 1969 – 30 November 1969

=== Stations ===
- Morrow Field, California, 2 March 1942
- Ontario Army Air Field, California, 29 May 1942
- Abilene Municipal Airport (later Abilene Army Air Field), Texas, 10 November 1942
- Esler Field, Louisiana, 3 April 1943
- Abilene Army Air Field, Texas, 10 September 1943
- Esler Field, Louisiana, 13 November 1943
- Key Field, Mississippi, 25 January 1945 – 26 February 1945
- Nancy-Ochey Airport (A-96), France, 22 March 1945
- Haguenau Airfield (Y-30), France, 3 April 1945 – July 1945
- Drew Field, Florida, 4 August 1945
- Brooks Field, Texas, 4 August 1945 – 31 March 1946
- Bergstrom Air Force Base, Texas, 15 October 1958 – 2 October 1966
- England Air Force Base, Louisiana, 15 May 1969
- Bien Hoa Air Base, Viet Nam, 15 November 1969 – 30 November 1969

=== Aircraft ===
- Douglas O-46, 1942–1943
- North American O-47, 1942–1943
- Stinson L-1 Vigilant, 1942–1943
- Taylorcraft L-2 Grasshopper, 1942–1943
- Bell P-39 Airacobra, 1943–1944
- Curtiss P-40 Warhawk, 1943–1945
- Douglas A-24 Banshee, 1943–1945
- North American B-25 Mitchell, 1943–1945
- Stinson L-5 Sentinel, 1943–1945
- North American P-51 Mustang, 1943–1946
- North American F-6 Mustang, 1945–1946
- Boeing KC-135 Stratotanker, 1958–1966
- Cessna A-37 Dragonfly, 1969

=== Awards and campaigns ===
Campaign Streamer	Campaign	Dates	Notes
	American Theater without inscription	2 March 1942 – 26 February 1945	10th Observation Squadron (later 10th Reconnaissance Squadron, 10th Tactical Reconnaissance Squadron)
	Antisubmarine	June 1942 – September 1942	10th Tactical Reconnaissance Squadron
	Central Europe	22 March 1945 – 21 May 1945	10th Tactical Reconnaissance Squadron
	Air Combat, EAME Theater	22 March 1945 – 11 May 1945	10th Tactical Reconnaissance Squadron

(Note: The 310th Attack Squadron was in Viet Nam during the Vietnam Winter-Spring 1970 Campaign, but did not receive credit for participation.)

== See also ==
- List of MAJCOM wings of the United States Air Force
- List of United States Air Force air refueling squadrons
