= 340th Flying Training Group =

340th Flying Training Group

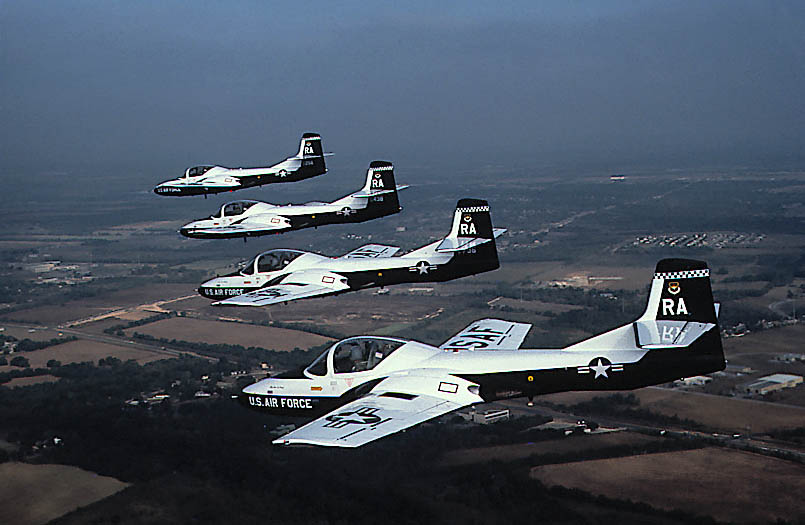
- T-37s of the 340th Flying Training Group
- Active: 1942–1945; 1947–1949; 1952–1966; 1968–1971; 1977–1992; 1998–present
- Country: United States
- Branch: United States Air Force
- Type: Group
- Role: Flying Training
- Part of: Air Force Reserve Command: Twenty-Second Air Force
- Garrison/HQ: Joint Base San Antonio, Texas
- Engagements: Mediterranean Theater of Operations
- Decorations: Distinguished Unit Citation; Air Force Outstanding Unit Award

Insignia
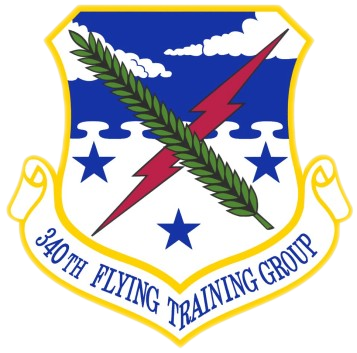
- 340th Flying Training Group emblem (Note: Approved 12 September 1955.)

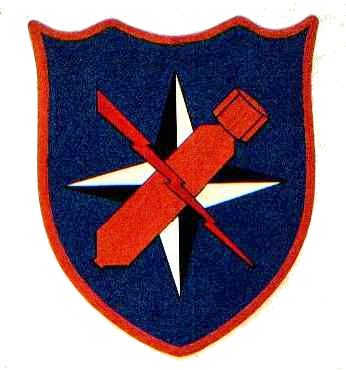
- 340th Bombardment Group emblem (World War II)

Aircraft flown
- Trainer: T-1 Jayhawk; T-6 Texan II; T-38 Talon

The 340th Flying Training Group is a reserve component of the United States Air Force. It is assigned to the Twenty-Second Air Force of Air Force Reserve Command, at Randolph Air Force Base, Joint Base San Antonio, Texas. The group is the headquarters for reserve flying training squadrons that are associate squadrons of Air Education and Training Command flying training squadrons.

The group's first predecessor is the 340th Bombardment Group. After training in the United States, the group deployed to the Mediterranean Theater of Operations, where it flew North American B-25 Mitchell medium bombers, primarily on air support and air interdiction missions, earning two Distinguished Unit Citations for its actions. After V-E Day, the group returned to the United States, where it was inactivated in November 1945.

The group was again active in the reserve from 1947 to 1949, but does not appear to have been fully manned or equipped with operational aircraft during this period. It was again organized in July 1968 at Carswell Air Force Base, Texas, where it conducted crew training on the General Dynamics FB-111 until inactivating in December 1971 as the bomber version of the "Aardvark" was deployed to other operational squadrons. In June 1977, the group was redesignated the 340th Air Refueling Group and activated with Boeing KC-135 Stratotankers.

The second predecessor of the group was activated in October 1952 as the 340th Bombardment Wing as the Air Force reopened Whiteman Air Force Base, Missouri. It flew Boeing B-47 Stratojets at Whiteman until September 1963, as the B-47 began to be withdrawn from Strategic Air Command operations. It was not inactivated with the withdrawal of its Stratojets. but moved on paper to Bergstrom Air Force Base, Texas, where it absorbed the Boeing B-52 Stratofortresses of the 4130th Strategic Wing, which was discontinued. The wing operated the B-52 until 1966, when it was inactivated as older model B-52s were withdrawn from service. It remained inactive until 1982, when it was consolidated with the 340th Air Refueling Group. The consolidated unit was expanded to become the 340th Air Refueling Wing in 1984 and continued the air refueling mission until it was inactivated in 1992, as Air Mobility Command reorganized its refueling force. It was activated in its current role in 1998.

== Mission ==
The 340th administers and executes the Air Education and Training Command and Air Force Reserve Command Associate Instructor Pilot Program and provides Active Guard Reserve and Traditional Reserve instructor pilots to augment the cadre of active duty pilots conducting pilot training.

== Units ==
The Group consists of a headquarters element at Randolph Air Force Base and five Associate Reserve Flying Training Squadrons flying the T-38/AT-38, T-1, and T-6.

- 5th Flying Training Squadron at Vance Air Force Base, Oklahoma
- 39th Flying Training Squadron at Joint Base San Antonio, Texas
- 43rd Flying Training Squadron at Columbus Air Force Base, Mississippi
- 70th Flying Training Squadron at United States Air Force Academy, Colorado
- 96th Flying Training Squadron at Laughlin Air Force Base, Texas
- 97th Flying Training Squadron at Sheppard Air Force Base, Texas
- 487th Training Squadron at Joint Base San Antonio, Texas

== History ==
=== World War II ===
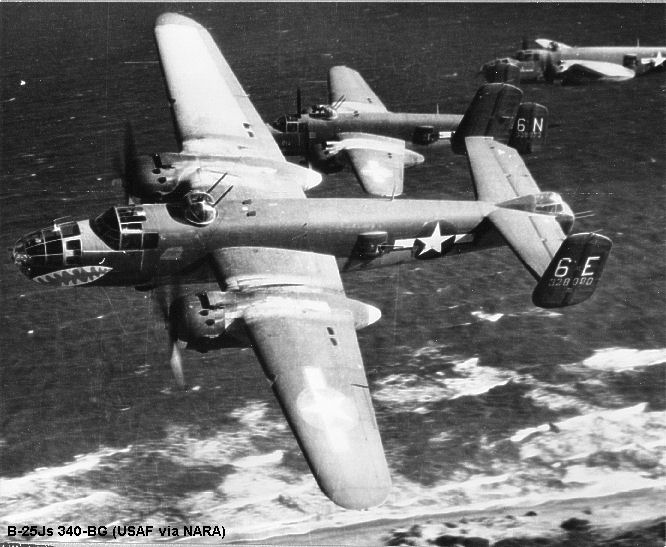
B-25J of the 340th Bomb Group-43-28080/486th Bomb Squadron

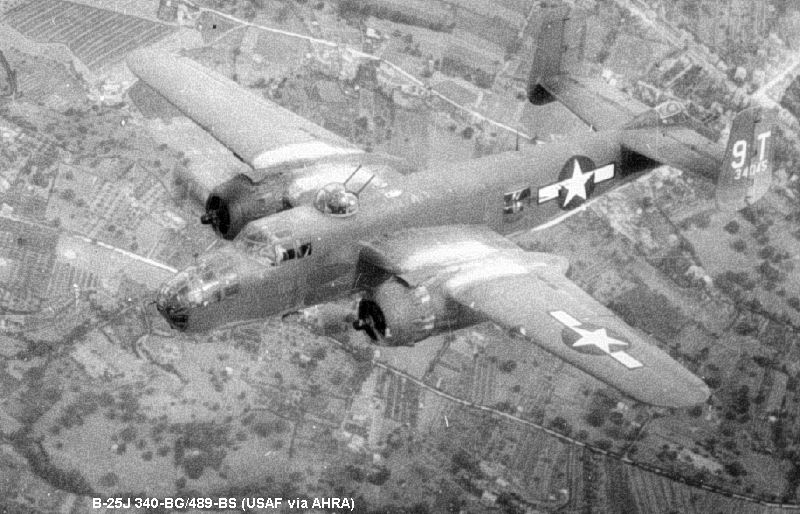
B-25J of the 340th Bomb Group 43-4045/489th Bomb Squadron

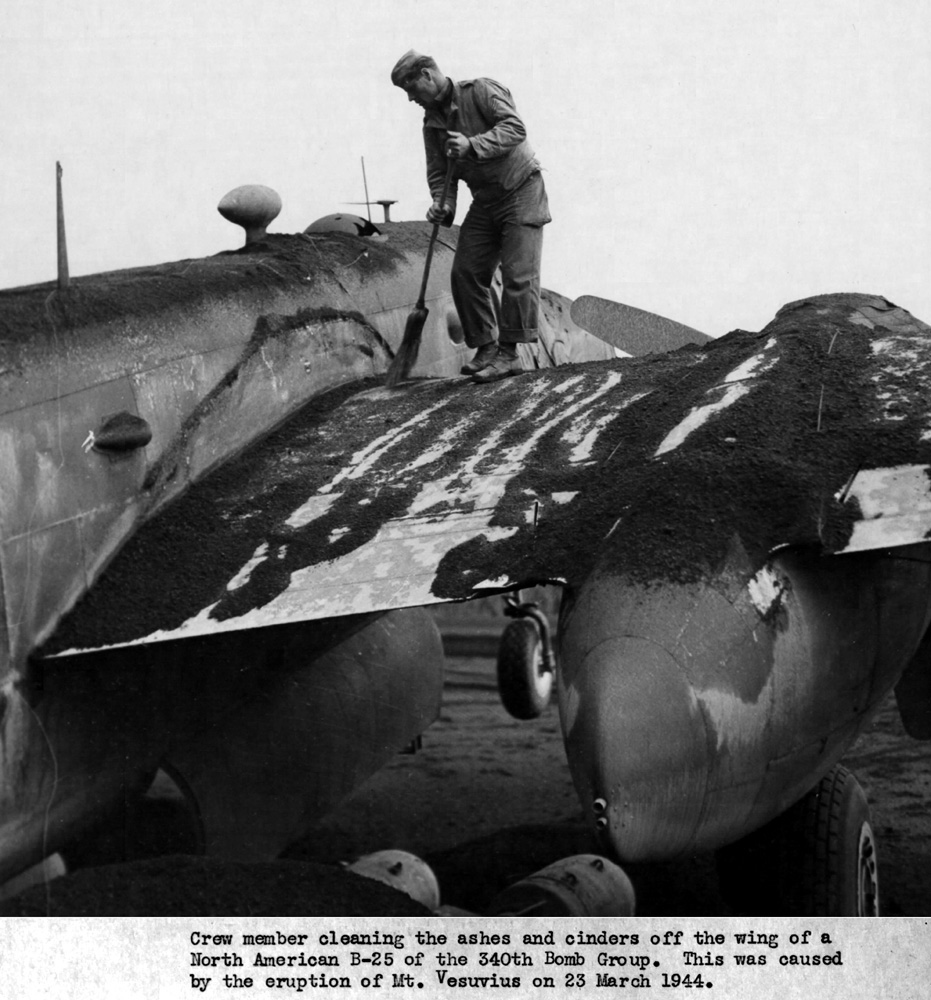
Ash is swept off of a bomber of the 340th Bombardment Group on 23 March 1944, after the eruption of Mount Vesuvius.

The 340th Bombardment Group was a World War II United States Army Air Forces combat organization. It served primarily in the Mediterranean Theater of World War II. From August 1942 to November 1945 it controlled 4 operational squadrons: the 486th, 487th, 488th, & 489th Bombardment Squadrons utilizing the North American North American B-25 Mitchell medium bomber.

The unit was constituted as 340th Bombardment Group (Medium) on 10 August 1942 and was activated on 20 August. It trained with B-25 Mitchell bombers for duty overseas. It arrived in the Mediterranean theater in March 1943. It was assigned first to Ninth Air Force, and in August 1943 to Twelfth Air Force when the Ninth moved to England.

The 340th served in combat from April 1943 to April 1945. Engaged chiefly in air support and air interdiction missions, but sometimes bombed strategic objectives. Targets included airfields, railroads, bridges, road junctions, supply depots, gun emplacements, troop concentrations, marshalling yards, and factories in Tunisia, Sicily, Italy, France, Austria, Bulgaria, Albania, Yugoslavia, and Greece.

it also dropped propaganda leaflets behind enemy lines. Participated in the reduction of Pantelleria and Lampedusa in June 1943, the bombing of German evacuation beaches near Messina in July, the establishment of the Salerno beachhead in September, the drive for Rome during January to June 1944, Operation Dragoon, the invasion of Southern France in August, and attacks on the Brenner Pass and other German lines of communication in northern Italy from September 1944 to April 1945.

In January 1944, Colonel Charles D. Jones was the commanding officer of the 340th Bombardment Group. On 10 March 1944, while participating in a bombing mission with the 486th Bombardment Squadron, he was shot down and became a prisoner of war for the remainder of the war. Colonel Jones later received the Distinguished Flying Cross (DFC) for this mission.

The 340th Group probably suffered the loss of more aircraft than any other medium bomber group during World War II primarily because of two devastating events that occurred in addition to their combat losses. The first of these events was the eruption of Mount Vesuvius in March 1944 when the 340th was based at Pompeii Airfield near Terzigno, Italy, just a few kilometers from the base of the mountain. The second event was a surprise German air raid of their base at Alesani Airfield, Corsica on 13 May 1944. Estimated losses were 75–88 B-25 Mitchells from Vesuvius and approximately 60 aircraft from the German air raid.

The 340th Received a Distinguished Unit Citation (DUC) for the period April–August 1943 when, although handicapped by difficult living conditions and unfavorable weather, the group supported the British Eighth Army in Tunisia and Allied forces in Sicily. A second DUC was received for the destruction of the Italian cruiser Taranto in the heavily defended harbor of La Spezia on 23 September 1944 before the ship could be used by the enemy to block the harbor's entrance.

With the end of the war in Europe, the 340th returned to the United States during July–August 1945. It was inactivated on 7 November 1945 at Columbia Army Air Base, South Carolina.

=== Air reserve service ===
The unit was reactivated and trained in the reserves from October 1947 to August 1949 at Tulsa Municipal Airport, Oklahoma. It was inactivated in 1949 as the reduced defense budget required the reduction of the number of groups in the United States Air Force

=== Strategic Air Command ===
==== B-47 Stratojet era ====
The United States Air Force established the 340th Bombardment Wing, and activated it on 20 October 1952 at Sedalia Air Force Base, Missouri. Three of the 320th Bombardment Group's was squadrons, the 486th, 487th and 488th Bombardment Squadrons were assigned. The 320th was assigned to Second Air Force.

The 340th replaced and absorbed the resources of the 4224th Air Base Squadron. Sedalia at the time was undergoing a massive modernization program, from its World War II configuration of temporary buildings and short runways designed for glider and pilot training to that of a modern, permanent air force base. The wing devoted its efforts to supervising base rehabilitation and new construction until May 1954, This was done by the 340th Air Base Group. The wing headquarters, tactical and maintenance squadrons had minimum manning during this period and were basically "paper" units.

The Wing received its first Boeing B-47 Stratojet in March 1954 and on 1 July 1955, was declared combat ready. The 340th Air Refueling Squadron, flying with Boeing KC-97 Stratofreighters was also assigned to the wing, but was detached to the 93d Bombardment Wing at Castle Air Force Base, California. On 3 December 1955, Sedalia Air Force Base was renamed Whiteman Air Force Base.

The 340th achieved recognition as one of Strategic Air Command (SAC)'s first units to reorganize under the dual deputy organization. It tested the feasibility of assigning Aviation Depot Squadron functions to the Deputy Commander for Maintenance. SAC later adopted the plan and accomplished a command-wide change which included the formation of Munitions Maintenance Squadrons. Until 1960, the 340th played a key role in SAC's mission of strategic deterrence. From 1961 to 1963, the 34th Air Refueling Squadron at Offutt Air Force Base, Nebraska was assigned to the 340th and operated the Operation Looking Glass SAC's Airborne Command Post with KC-135's.

By 1962 the B-47 was being programmed for retirement as it was believed that it could not penetrate the air defenses of the Soviet Union. The wing began phasing down and sent its aircraft to other SAC wings or to flyable storage at Davis–Monthan Air Force Base, Arizona. The 340th transferred host responsibilities for Whiteman to the incoming 351st Strategic Missile Wing. On 1 September 1963 the 340th moved without personnel or equipment to Bergstrom Air Force Base, Texas and became a heavy bomber wing, replacing the 4130th Strategic Wing.

==== B-52 Stratofortress era ====
===== Background =====
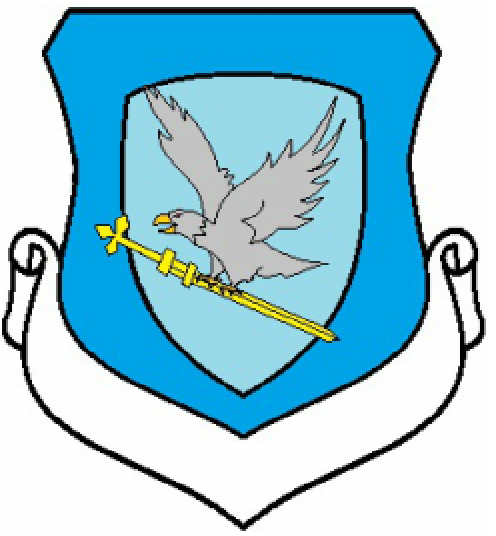
4130th Strategic Wing emblem

On 1 October 1958 SAC established the 4130th Strategic Wing at Bergstrom as part of SAC's plan to disperse its Boeing B-52 Stratofortress heavy bombers over a larger number of bases, thus making it more difficult for the Soviet Union to knock out the entire fleet with a surprise first strike and assigned it to the 19th Air Division. The wing also assumed host base responsibilities as Bergstrom transferred from Tactical Air Command (TAC) to SAC. Two weeks later the 910th Air Refueling Squadron, flying Boeing KC-135 Stratotankers was activated and assigned to the wing. The wing became fully operational in January 1959 when the 335th Bombardment Squadron, consisting of 15 B-52s moved to Bergstrom from Biggs Air Force Base, Texas where it had been one of the three squadrons of the 97th Bombardment Wing and the 50th Aviation Depot Squadron was activated to oversee the wing's special weapons. Starting in 1960, one third of the wing's aircraft were maintained on fifteen-minute alert, fully fueled, armed and ready for combat to reduce vulnerability to a Soviet missile strike. This was increased to half the wing's aircraft in 1962. The 4130th (and later the 340th) continued to maintain an alert commitment until the wing inactivated in 1966. In 1962, the wing's bombers began to be equipped with the GAM-77 Hound Dog and the GAM-72 Quail air-launched cruise missiles, The 4130th Airborne Missile Maintenance Squadron was activated in November to maintain these missiles. On 1 July 1963 the wing was reassigned to the 4th Air Division.

However, SAC strategic wings could not carry a permanent history or lineage and SAC looked for a way to make its strategic wings permanent. (Note: MAJCON units could not carry a permanent history or lineage. Ravenstein, Guide to Air Force Lineage and Honors, p. 12.) In 1962, in order to perpetuate the lineage of bombardment units with illustrious World War II records, Headquarters SAC received authority from Headquarters USAF to discontinue its Major Command controlled (MAJCON) strategic wings that were equipped with combat aircraft and to activate USAF controlled (AFCON) units, most of which were inactive at the time which could carry a lineage and history.

===== Replacement of strategic wing =====
The 340th was reassigned to Bergstrom without personnel or equipment in September 1963, where it assumed the aircraft, personnel and equipment of the discontinued 4130th Wing. (Note: The 340th Wing continued, through temporary bestowal, the history, and honors of the World War II 340th Bombardment Group. It was also entitled to retain the honors (but not the history or lineage) of the 4130th. This temporary bestowal ended in January 1982, when the wing and group were consolidated into a single unit.) The 486th Bombardment Squadron, one of the 340th's World War II historical squadrons, replaced the 335th Bombardment Squadron. The 859th Medical Group, 50th Munitions Maintenance Squadron and the 910th Air Refueling Squadron were reassigned to the 340th. The 4130th's support group and maintenance and security squadrons were replaced by ones with the 340th numerical designation of the wing. Each of the new units assumed the personnel, equipment, and mission of its predecessor.

The wing continued SAC global strategic bombardment training and air refueling operations. Beginning in 1965, the Air Force decided to convert most of its B-52Ds to conventional warfare capability for service in Southeast Asia. Foremost among the changes needed was to give the B-52D the ability to carry a significantly larger load of conventional bombs. This led to the Big Belly project which was begun in December 1965.

By 1966, Intercontinental ballistic missiles had been deployed and become operational as part of the United States' strategic triad, and the need for B-52s had been reduced. In addition, funds were also needed to cover the costs of combat operations in Indochina. The 340th Bombardment Wing was inactivated on 2 October 1966 and its aircraft were reassigned to other SAC units.

In connection with the wing's inactivation, Bergstrom was returned to TAC, which closed James Connally Air Force Base in Waco, Texas and moved the headquarters of Twelfth Air Force to Bergstrom and activated the 75th Tactical Reconnaissance Wing as the new host organization at the base.

==== Bombardment training ====
The 340th Group was reactivated on 2 July 1968 at Carswell Air Force Base, Texas. The 340th was given the primary mission of conducting initial qualification training for General Dynamics FB-111A aircrew members. The FB-111A was the all-weather strategic bombing version of the F-111, intended as an interim successor to SAC'x B-52 Stratofortress and Convair B-58 Hustler. The group was stationed at Carswell, as the FB-111A were being produced at the huge General Dynamics plant, also known as Air Force Plant #4 in Fort Worth, and it shared the main runway at Carswell.

The first production FB-111A aircraft (serial 67-159) flew on 13 July 1968. It was accepted by the Air Force on 30 August. A second FB-111A was delivered on 25 October. However, these two planes were powered by TF30-P-12A engines designed for Naval service instead of the Air Force P-7 turbofan. In addition, problems with the avionics subsystem slowed further deliveries, with the Air Force not accepting its next FB-111A until 23 June 1969.

On 8 October 1969 the seventh FB-111A manufactured (serial 67–7193) entered service with the group's 4007th Combat Crew Training Squadron. The 340th's staff and instructor received training in TAC F-111As at Nellis Air Force Base, Nevada with the 4527th Combat Crew Training Squadron. The group also maintained a combat crew force capable of conducting bombardment operations if necessary with the FB-111A.

On 7 October 1970, the 340th's first major aircraft accident occurred when FB-111A 68-253 crashed at Carswell, causing the deaths of Lt. Col Robert S. Montgomery (9th Bombardment Squadron's Commander) and his navigator, Lt. Col Charles G. Robinson. The 340th participated in SAC's annual Bombing and Navigation Competition held at McCoy Air Force Base, Florida from 13 to 20 November 1970. Showing an outstanding performance, the group finished the competition first in bombing and second in navigation. The 340th also participated in the Strike Command Bombing and Navigation held 17–23 April 1971. The FB-111A was not allowed to compete for the trophies but flew in the competition.

The last production FB-111A (69–6514) was delivered to SAC on 30 June 1971, and the 340th Bomb Group was inactivated on 31 December 1971 with the end of production. A total of 76 FB-111A aircraft were produced, and when group was inactivated the 4007th Combat Crew Training Squadron moved to Plattsburgh Air Force Base, New York and became part of the 380th Strategic Aerospace Wing with 38 FB-111A aircraft

==== Air refueling operations ====
Six years later the group was redesignated as the 340th Air Refueling Group and reactivated at Altus Air Force Base, Oklahoma as a tenant unit. At Altus the group was assigned the 11th Air Refueling Squadron equipped with KC-135s. The group and wing were consolidated in March 1982.

The consolidated unit was redesignated the 340th Air Refueling Wing, Heavy on 1 October 1984 and gained the 306th Air Refueling Squadron as a second KC-135 squadron. The wing was assigned to SAC's 19th Air Division. It was then reassigned to Fifteenth Air Force, on 6 June 1988.

With the inactivation of SAC, the wing was reassigned to Air Mobility Command on 1 June 1992 and was inactivated on 1 October 1992 as part of the general drawdown of the USAF after the Cold War ended, its components subsequently merging with collocated 443d Airlift Wing at Altus to form the 97th Air Mobility Wing.

=== Pilot training ===
The 340th was reactivated at Randolph Air Force Base, Texas, as the 340th Flying Training Group on 1 April 1998 as an Air Force Reserve Command unit under Tenth Air Force. The 340th was organized to provide associate instructor pilots for the Air Education and Training Command Specialized Undergrasuate Pilot Training mission.

== Lineage ==
340th Flying Training Group

- Constituted as the 340th Bombardment Group (Medium) on 10 August 1942

Activated on 20 August 1942
Redesignated 340th Bombardment Group, Medium on 20 August 1943
Inactivated on 7 November 1945

- Redesignated 340th Bombardment Group, Light on 8 October 1947

Activated in the reserve on 31 October 1947
Inactivated on 19 August 1949

- Redesignated 340th Bombardment Group, Medium and activated on 22 May 1968 (not organized)

Organized on 2 July 1968
Inactivated on 31 December 1971

- Redesignated 340th Air Refueling Group, Heavy' on 14 June 1977

Activated on 1 July 1977

- Consolidated with the 340th Bombardment Wing, Medium on 31 March 1982

Redesignated 340th Air Refueling Wing, Heavy on 1 October 1984
Redesignated 340th Air Refueling Wing on 1 September 1991
Inactivated on 1 October 1992

- Redesignated 340th Flying Training Group and activated on 1 April 1998

340th Bombardment Wing

- Constituted on 3 October 1952 as the 340th Bombardment Wing, Medium

Activated on 20 October 1952
Redesignated 340th Bombardment Wing, Heavy on 1 September 1963
Discontinued and inactivated, on 2 October 1966

- Consolidated with the 340th Air Refueling Group, Heavy, on 31 March 1982 as the 340th Air Refueling Group, Heavy

=== Assignments ===
- Third Air Force, 20 August 1942 – unknown
- Ninth Air Force, 5 April 1943
- Twelfth Air Force, 22 August 1943
- XII Air Support Command, 1 September 1943
- 57th Bombardment Wing, 1 November 1943
- XII Bomber Command, 2 January 1944
- 57th Bombardment Wing, 1 March 1944
- Army Air Forces, Mediterranean Theater of Operations, 26 July 1945
- First Air Force, 7 August – 7 November 1945
- 310th Bombardment Wing, Light (later 310 Air Division, 31 October 1947 – 19 August 1949
- Second Air Force, 20 October 1952
- Eighth Air Force, 1 July 1955
- Second Air Force, 1 January 1959
- 17th Air Division (later 17 Strategic Aerospace Division), 15 July 1959
- 4th Air Division, 1 September 1963
- 19th Air Division, 1 September 1964 – 2 October 1966
- Strategic Air Command, 22 May 1968 (not organized
- 19th Air Division, 2 July 1968 – 31 December 1971
- 19th Air Division, 1 July 1977
- Fifteenth Air Force, 16 June 1988 – 1 October 1992
- Tenth Air Force, 1 April 1998 – 30 September 2011
- Twenty-Second Air Force, 1 October 2011 – present

=== Components ===
==== Groups ====
- 340th Air Base Group (later 340th Combat Support Group): 30 October 1952 – 1 July 1966
- 340th Logistics Group: 1 September 1991 – 1 October 1992
- 340th Medical Group (later 340th USAF Hospital): 30 October 1952 – 1 October 1958
- 340th Operations Group: 1 September 1991 – 1 October 1992
- 398th Operations Group: 1 June 1992 – 1 October 1992
- 805th Medical Group: 1 October 1958 – 1 September 1963
- 859th Medical Group: 1 September 1963 – 1 July 1966

==== Squadrons ====
Operational Squadrons

- 5th Flying Training Squadron: 1 April 1998 – present
- 9th Bombardment Squadron: 2 July 1969 – 31 December 1971
- 11th Air Refueling Squadron: 1 July 1977 – 1 September 1991
- 34th Air Refueling Squadron: 1 October 1958 – 1 October 1959
- 39th Flying Training Squadron: 2 April 2001 – present
- 43d Flying Training Squadron: 1 April 1998 – present
- 96th Flying Training Squadron: 1 April 1998 – present
- 97th Flying Training Squadron: 1 April 1998 – present
- 100th Flying Training Squadron: 1 April 1999 – 12 September 2007
- 306th Air Refueling Squadron: 1 October 1984 – 1 September 1991
- 340th Air Refueling Squadron: 20 October 1952 – 1 July 1953 (detached entire period); 18 January 1954 – 15 October 1962 (detached 29 October – 31 December 1956, 25 September – 28 December 1957, 5 January – 9 April 1959, and 3 January – 1 April 1961)
- 486th Bombardment Squadron: 20 August 1942 – 7 November 1945; 31 October 1947 – 19 August 1949; 20 October 1952 – 2 October 1966 (not operational, 20 October 1952 – Feb 1954)
- 487th Bombardment Squadron (later 487th Training): 20 August 1942 – 7 November 1945; 31 October 1947 – 19 August 1949; 20 October 1952 – 1 September 1963 (not operational, 20 October 1952 – Feb 1954); 25 December 2024 - present
- 488th Bombardment Squadron: 20 August 1942 – 7 November 1945; 31 October 1947 – 19 August 1949; 20 October 1952 – 1 September 1963 (not operational, 20 October 1952 – Feb 1954)
- 489th Bombardment Squadron: 20 August 1942 – 7 November 1945; 10 November 1947 – 27 June 1949; 1 October 1958 – 1 January 1962
- 910th Air Refueling Squadron: 1 September 1963 – 2 October 1966
- 4007th Combat Crew Training Squadron: 2 July 1968 – 31 December 1971
- 4111th Bombardment Squadron: 2 July 1968 – 2 July 1969

Maintenance Squadrons

- 16th Munitions Maintenance Squadron: 1 July 1960 – 1 September 1963
- 50th Munitions Maintenance Squadron: 1 September 1963 – 2 October 1966
- 340th Airborne Missile Maintenance Squadron: 1 September 1963 – 2 October 1966
- 340th Armament and Electronics Maintenance Squadron (later 340th Avionics Maintenance Squadron): 20 October 1952 – 2 October 1966, 2 July 1968 – 31 December 1971
- 340th Field Maintenance Squadron (later 340th Consolidated Aircraft Maintenance Squadron, 340th Field Maintenance Squadron, 340th Maintenance Squadron): 20 October 1952 – 2 October 1966; 2 July 1968 – 31 December 1971; 1 July 1977 – 1 September 1991
- 340th Periodic Maintenance Squadron (later 340th Organizational Maintenance Squadron): 20 October 1952 – 2 October 1966; 2 July 1968 – 31 December 1971; c. 1 October 1984 – 1 September 1992

=== Stations ===
- Columbia Army Air Base, South Carolina, 20 August 1942
- Walterboro Army Air Field, South Carolina 30 November 1942 – 30 January 1943
- RAF Kabrit, Egypt March 1943
- Medenine Airfield, Tunisia March 1943
- Sfax Airfield, Tunisia April 1943
- Hergla Airfield, Tunisia 2 June 1943
- Comiso Airfield, Sicily c. 2 August 1943
- Catania Airport, Sicily 27 August 1943
- San Pancrazio Airfield, Italy c. 15 October 1943
- Foggia Airfield, Italy 19 November 1943
- Pompeii Airfield, Italy c. 2 January 1944
- Paestum Airfield, Italy 23 March 1944
- Alesani Landing Ground, Corsica, France c. 14 April 1944
- Rimini Airfield, Italy c. 2 April – 27 July 1945
- Seymour Johnson Field, North Carolina 9 August 1945
- Columbia Army Air Base, South Carolina 2 October – 7 November 1945
- Tulsa Municipal Airport, Oklahoma, (1947–1949)
- Sedalia Air Force Base (later Whiteman Air Force Base), Missouri, 1952 – 1 September 1963
- Bergstrom Air Force Base, Texas, 1 September 1963 – 1966
- Carswell Air Force Base, Texas, (1968–1971)
- Altus Air Force Base, Oklahoma, (1977–1992)
- Randolph Air Force Base, Texas, (1997 – present)

=== Aircraft ===
- North American B-25 Mitchell (1942–1945)
- North American AT-6 Texan (1947–1949)
- Beechcraft T-11 Kansan (1947–1949)
- Boeing B-47 Stratojet (1952–1963)
- Boeing KC-97 Stratofreighter, (1954-1962)
- Boeing B-52 Stratofortress (1963–1966)
- General Dynamics FB-111 Aardvark (1969–1971)
- Lockheed T-33 T-Bird (1969–1971)
- Boeing KC-135 Stratotanker (1959, 1963-1966, 1977–1992)
- Cessna T-37B Tweet (1997–2009)
- Northrop T-38 Talon (1997–present)
- T-1 Jayhawk (1997–present)

== See also ==
- List of B-47 units of the United States Air Force
- List of B-52 Units of the United States Air Force
- 520th Air Service Group Support unit for the group during World War II
