= Medenine Airfield =

Abandoned World War II military airfield in Tunisia

- Near: Medenine, Tunisia

Site information
- Operator: French Air Force; Luftwaffe (National Socialist); Royal Air Force; United States Army Air Forces
- Controlled by: French Air Force (1935-1942); German Luftwaffe (1942-43); Royal Air Force (1943-45); Ninth Air Force (1943)

Location
- Location in Tunisia
- Coordinates: 33°20′59.45″N 010°26′32.72″E

Site history
- In use: 1938-45
- Battles/wars: World War II: Western Desert Campaign

Medenine Airfield is an abandoned military airfield in Tunisia, which was located just to the west of Medenine, 46 km N of Tataouine; 430 km south-southeast of Tunis.

== History ==
Medenine Airfield was a French Air Force (French: Armée de l'Air) facility built in Tunisia prior to World War II. After the Fall of France in June 1940, it was briefly used by the Vichy French Air Force (French: Armée de l'air de Vichy) until November 1942 when as part of Case Anton, the military occupation of Vichy France carried out by Germany and Italy, it was taken over by the German Luftwaffe.

During both the American West African Campaign and British Western Desert Campaign, the airfield was attacked repeatedly by elements of the American Twelfth and Ninth Air Forces, along with the British Royal Air Force beginning in late January 1943 with B-24 Liberator heavy bombers, and was strafed with P-40 Warhawk fighter-bombers. The airfield was seized by New Zealand Commonwealth ground forces during March 1943.

It was then repaired by Royal Engineers and placed back into operational service. With the end of combat in Tunisia during the summer or 1943, the airfield was dismantled and abandoned. Today the remains of the main runway is visible on aerial photography, and perhaps some taxiways.

== Major units assigned ==
French Air Force/Luftwaffe

- Undetermined units

Royal Air Force

- No. 450 Squadron RAAF (6–14 April 1943)

United States Army Air Forces (Ninth Air Force)

- 12th Bombardment Group, 3–15 April 1943, B-25 Mitchell
- 340th Bombardment Group, March–April 1943, B-25 Mitchell
- 66th Fighter Squadron (57th Fighter Group), (4–11 April 1943) (P-40 Warhawk)
