= Pompeii Airfield =

Abandoned military airfield near Naples

Pompeii Airfield
- Part of Twelfth Air Force
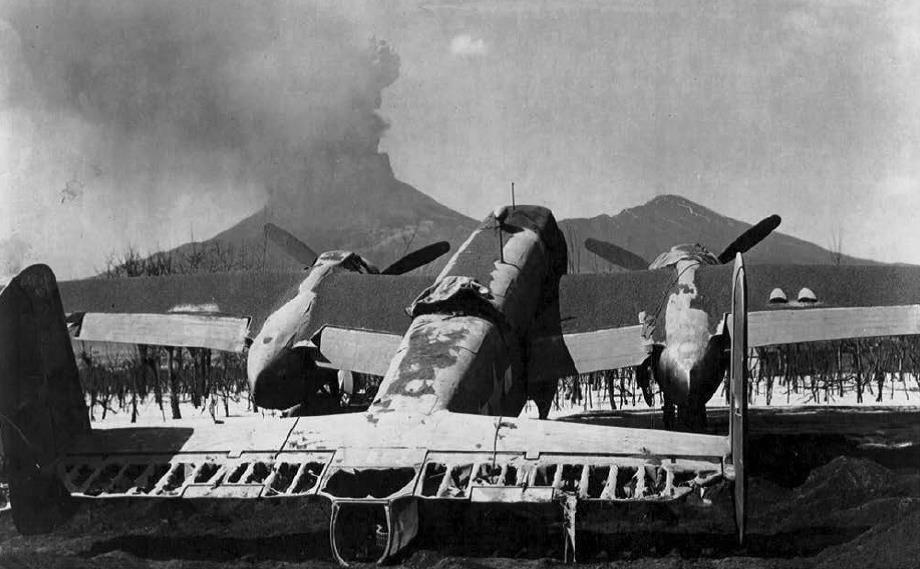
- An unidentified B-25C Mitchell of the 340th Bombardment Group, damaged after the March 18, 1944 Mount Vesuvius eruption. The volcano erupted, showering nearby airfields with tons of hot volcanic ash and brimstone and severely damaged a significant number of Allied aircraft. Aside from losing many of its B-25s, the group also suffered significant damage to its maintenance and accommodation facilities.

Site information
- Type: Military airfield
- Controlled by: United States Army Air Forces

Location
- Coordinates: 40°47′39″N 014°30′21″E

Site history
- Built: 1943
- In use: 1943–1944

Location of Pompeii Airfield, Italy

Pompeii Airfield is an abandoned World War II military airfield in Italy, located approximately one km (0.62 mi) south of Terzigno, a few kilometers east of the base of Mount Vesuvius, and approximately 20 km (12 mi) east-southeast of Naples.

The airfield was an all-weather temporary field built by the XII Engineering Command of the United States Army Twelfth Air Force using a graded earth compacted surface with a prefabricated hessian (burlap) surfacing known as PHS. PHS was made of an asphalt-impregnated jute which was rolled out over the compacted surface over a square mesh track (SMT) grid of wire joined in three-inch squares. Pierced Steel Planking was also used for parking areas and dispersal sites when it was available. Dumps for supplies, bombs, ammunition, gasoline drums, drinking water, and an electrical grid for communications and lighting were also constructed. Tents were used for billeting and support facilities, and an access road was built to connect the airfield facilities with existing roads.

The Twelfth's 340th Bombardment Group with their North American B-25 Mitchell medium bombers occupied the airfield on January 2, 1944. When Mount Vesuvius erupted in March 1944, the B-25s were covered with hot ash that burned the fabric control surfaces, glazed, melted, or cracked the Plexiglas, and even tipped some B-25s onto their tails from the weight of the ash and tephra. The eruption destroyed the base and nearly all of the 340th's planes. Estimates vary from 70 to 90 aircraft. There were no deaths at Pompeii Airfield and the only casualties in the 340th were a sprained wrist and a few cuts, but the effects of the volcano on the aircraft proved insurmountable despite a major effort by the 12th Air Force to repair and salvage the damaged planes. The airfield was dismantled and the 340th relocated to Paestum Airfield on March 23, 1944.

Now overgrown with vegetation, Pompeii Airfield's main runway can still be detected in aerial photographs.
