= 551st Strategic Missile Squadron =

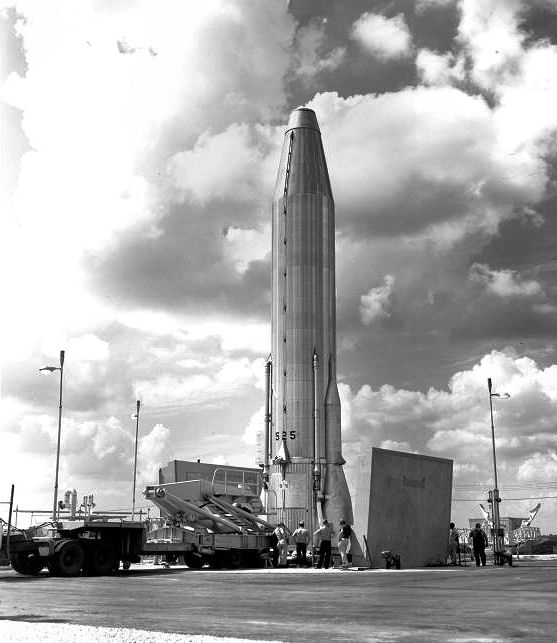
- Squadron SM-65F Atlas at Beatrice, Nebraska
- Active: 1942–1945; 1947–1949; 1961–1965
- Country: United States
- Branch: United States Air Force
- Type: Squadron
- Role: Intercontinental ballistic missile
- Motto: Strength Maintains Security (1962-1965)
- Engagements: European Theater of Operations
- Decorations: Distinguished Unit Citation

Insignia
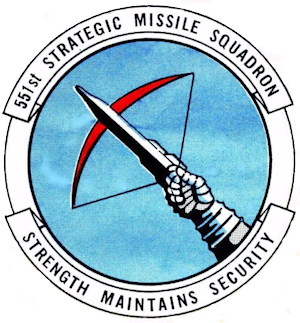
- 551st Strategic Missile Squadron emblem (Note: Approved 20 June 1962. Description: On a sky blue disc edged Air Force blue, bendwise throughout a mailed hand issuing from sinister base, dark gray, shaded black, highlights white, grasping a drawn bow red, with arrow whitem, shaded black, the taut string black.)

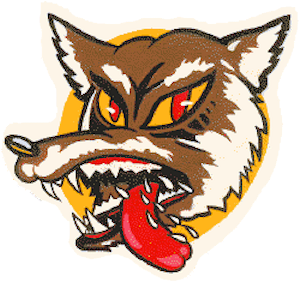
- 551st Bombardment Squadron emblem
- World War II fuselage code (Note: The code letters were apparently not widely used by the squadron until 1945. Watkins, pp. 70-71; Freeman, p. 288.): HR

The 551st Strategic Missile Squadron is an inactive United States Air Force unit. It was last assigned to the 98th Strategic Aerospace Wing at Lincoln Air Force Base, Nebraska. The squadron was equipped with the SM-65F Atlas intercontinental ballistic missile, with a mission of nuclear deterrence. The squadron was inactivated on 25 June 1965 as part of the phaseout of the Atlas.

The squadron was first activated during World War II in December 1942 as the 551st Bombardment Squadron. After training in the United States, it deployed to England, where it participated in the strategic bombing campaign against Germany. The squadron was twice awarded the Distinguished Unit Citation for its actions during the war. Following V-E Day, the squadron returned to the United States, where it was inactivated. The squadron was activated in the reserve from 1947 to 1949, but does not appear to have been fully manned or equipped.

== History ==
=== World War II ===
==== Initial activation and training ====
The squadron was first activated at Davis-Monthan Field, Arizona as the 551st Bombardment Squadron, one of the four original squadrons of the 385th Bombardment Group. The following month it moved to El Paso Army Air Field, Texas, but did not receive a full complement of personnel and begin training with Boeing B-17 Flying Fortress until it moved to Geiger Field, Washington in February 1943. It completed its training and began deploying to the European Theater of Operations. The air echelon staged through Kearney Army Air Field, Nebraska in May 1943 and ferried its Flying Fortresses to England via the northern ferry route. The ground echelon left for the port of embarkation and sailed on the RMS Queen Elizabeth on 1 July 1943.

==== Combat in Europe ====
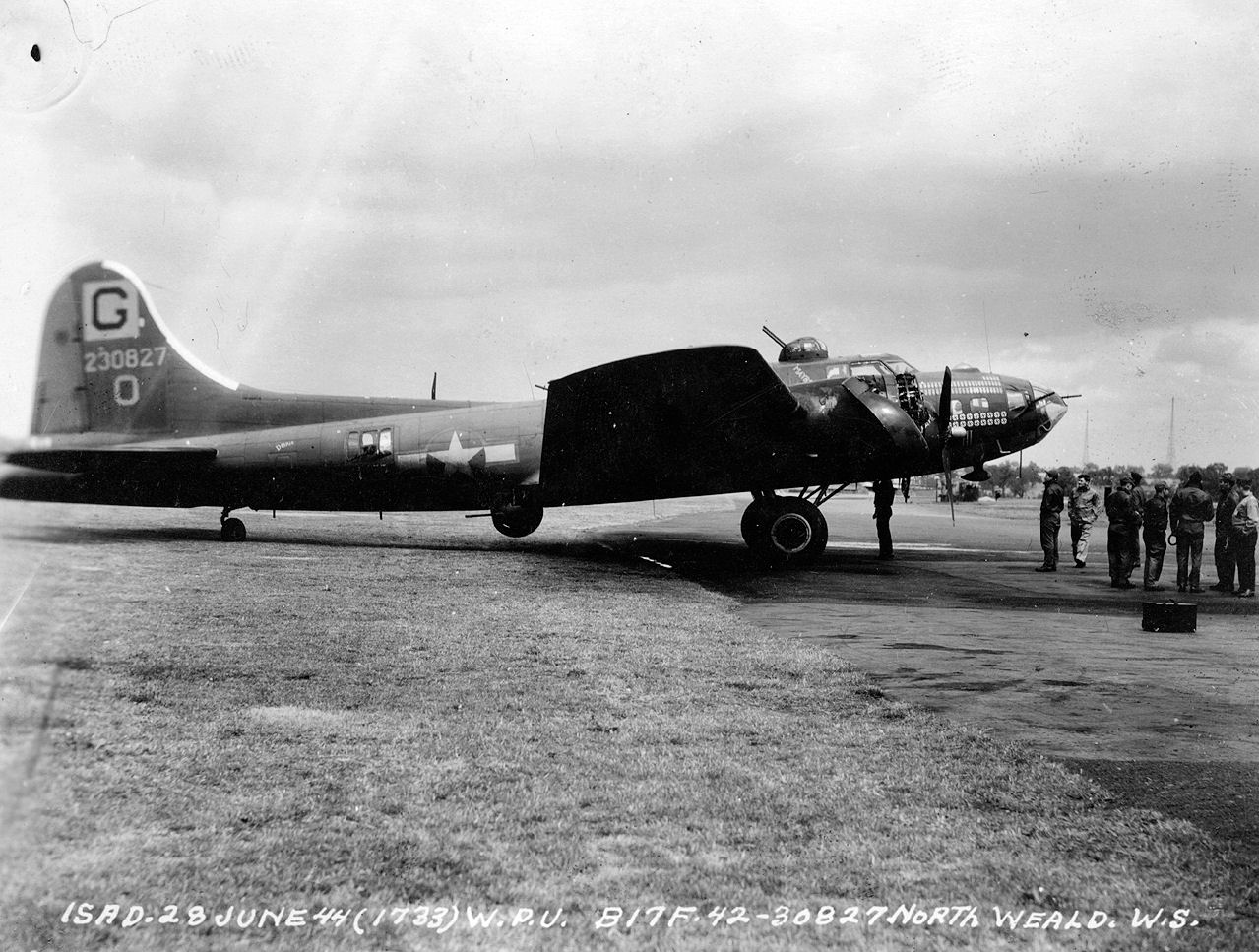
385th Group B-17 Flying Fortress (Note: The aircraft is Boeing B-17F-120-BO Flying Fortress, serial 42-30827, Round Trip Ticket III, XA-O Taken 28 June 1944 after an emergency landing at North Weald. The plane was declared "war weary" and was salvaged on 12 June 1945.)

The squadron assembled at its combat station, RAF Great Ashfield, England, and began participating in the strategic bombing campaign against Germany, flying its first combat mission on 17 July 1943. The unit carried out attacks on industrial targets, including communications centers as well as air bases in Belgium, France, Germany, the Netherlands, Belgium and Norway, striking targets as far away as Poland. On 17 August 1943, the squadron participated in an attack on the Messerschmitt aircraft factory at Regensburg, which involved a long flight over heavily defended enemy territory with little protection from escorting fighters. (Note: Half the fighter escorts missed the scheduled rendezvous, the other half returned to England at the limit of their fuel supplies before the heaviest interceptor attacks began. Freeman, p. 68.) For this mission, the squadron received the Distinguished Unit Citation. On 12 May 1944, the squadron flew with the 385th Group as it led the 4th Combat Bombardment Wing through heavy opposition to attack an airplane repair facility at Zwickau. An estimated 200 enemy fighters attacked the bomber stream, heavily disordering its formation. The bombers were able to reform and achieved a high degree of accuracy with their bombs. For this attack, the 551st received a second DUC.

Strategic industrial targets for the squadron in Germany included the AGO Flugzeugwerke factory at Oschersleben and the Henschel Flugzeugwerke factory at Marienberg; a battery manufacturing plant at Stuttgart, oil refineries at Ludwigshafen and Merseburg and rail marshalling yards at Munich and Oranienburg. It also attacked Luftwaffe bases at Beauvais/Tille Airfield and Chartres Airfield, France.

The squadron was occasionally diverted from the strategic bombing mission to perform air support and interdiction missions. It struck coastal defenses in June 1944 in preparation for Operation Overlord, the Normandy invasion, and on D-Day attacked transportation chokepoints and marshalling yards. In late July, it attacked enemy positions to support Operation Cobra, the breakout at Saint Lo. In late December 1944 and early January 1945, it carried out attacks on German fortifications and transportation to support forces engaged in the Battle of the Bulge. As the Allies made their final thrust through France into Germany, it attacked troop concentrations and communications targets.

The squadron flew its last mission on 20 April 1945. Following V-E Day, the squadron transported prisoners of war from Germany and flew six missions dropping food supplies in the Netherlands. (Note: One of the food missions counted as a combat mission when the unit was fired on. Freeman, p. 254.) The air echelon began ferrying its aircraft back to the United States on 19 June and all bombers had departed Great Ashfield by the end of the month. The ground echelon of the squadron left Europe in August 1945, sailing on the RMS Queen Elizabeth and the squadron was inactivated in the United States at Sioux Falls Army Air Field, South Dakota on 28 August 1945.

=== Air Force reserve ===
On 15 September 1947, the squadron was activated under Air Defense Command (ADC) in the reserve at Selfridge Field, Michigan. ADC's 136th AAF Base Unit (later the 2242d Air Force Reserve Training Center) supervised the unit's training. In July 1948 Continental Air Command (ConAC) assumed responsibility for managing reserve and Air National Guard units from ADC. The squadron does not appear to have been fully manned or equipped during this period. The 551st was inactivated when ConAC reorganized its reserve units under the wing base organization system in June 1949. President Truman’s reduced 1949 defense budget also required reductions in the number of units in the Air Force, The squadron's personnel and equipment were transferred to elements of the 439th Troop Carrier Wing.

=== Intercontinental ballistic missile squadron ===
The squadron was redesignated the 551st Strategic Missile Squadron and organized at Lincoln Air Force Base, Nebraska in April 1961 as a Strategic Air Command (SAC) SM-65F Atlas intercontinental ballistic missile launch squadron and assigned to the 818th Air Division. The squadron and the 550th Strategic Missile Squadron at Schilling Air Force Base, Kansas were the first Atlas F units to organize. The squadron was assigned twelve missiles at twelve independent widely dispersed launch sites.

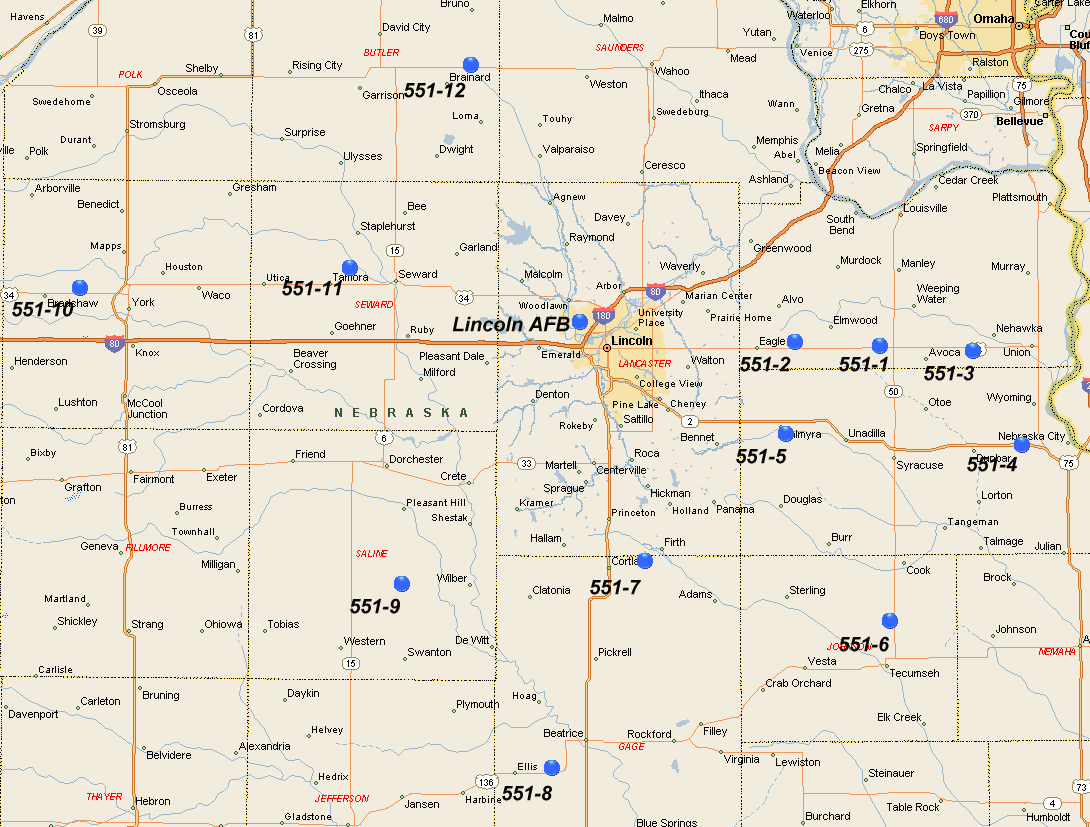
SM-65F Atlas Missile sites

The squadron operated twelve missile sites with one missile at each site:

551–1 4.9 mi WNW of Avoca, NE 40°48′59″N 096°12′22″W
551–2 3.6 mi E of Eagle, NE 40°49′20″N 096°21′42″W
551–3 2.6 mi WSW of Nehawka, NE 40°48′32″N 096°02′01″W
551–4 4.5 mi W of Nebraska City, NE 40°40′36″N 095°56′43″W
551–5 0.8 mi SSE of Palmyra, NE 40°41′40″N 096°22′50″W
551–6 4.5 mi N of Tecumseh, NE 40°25′53″N 096°11′23″W
551–7 2.1 mi WNW of Firth, NE 40°30′59″N 096°38′24″W
551–8 4.3 mi SW of Beatrice NE 40°13′40″N 096°48′42″W
551–9 6.7 mi W of Wilber, NE 40°29′02″N 097°05′18″W
551–10 3.3 mi ENE of Bradshaw, NE 40°53′43″N 097°41′09″W
551–11 3.0 mi NE of Tamora, NE 40°55′36″N 097°11′11″W
551–12 2.9 mi NE of Brainard, NE 41°12′40″N 096°57′42″W

The Atlas F was the final and most advanced version of the Atlas ICBM and was stored in a vertical position inside underground concrete and steel silos. When stored, the Atlas F sat atop an elevator. If a missile was placed on alert, it was fueled with RP-1 (kerosene) liquid fuel, which could be stored inside the missile for extended periods. If a decision was made to launch the missile, the missile was raised to the surface and the liquid oxygen tank was filled. The launch would occur shortly after completion of this process. The exposure on the surface that this procedure entailed was the great weakness of the Atlas F. It was exposed and vulnerable during this time. The Titan II and Minuteman missiles could be launched from within their silos, thereby eliminating this vulnerability. Also, since the Titan did not use a cryogenic fuel or oxidizer, and the Minuteman was a solid fuel rocket, they could be stored fully fueled and ready to launch within a very few minutes.

During the Cuban Missile Crisis, on 20 October 1962, SAC directed that the squadron's missiles that were not on alert for modifications be placed on alert status "as covertly as possible." Training was suspended and missiles being used for operational training were to be placed on alert as soon as liquid oxygen became available. (Note: For safety reasons, training missiles used liquid nitrogen, rather than liquid oxygen in their propellant tanks. Kipp, et al., pp. 62-63) Four crews from the squadron were deployed to Plattsburgh Air Force Base, New York to augment the 556th Strategic Missile Squadron there. The 556th had insufficient trained crews to man its missiles, which were being turned over to SAC during the crisis. From 3 November the number of alert missiles was reduced until on 29 November the number was the same as before the crisis. As tensions eased, on 15 November normal training resumed.

The squadron became nonoperational on 12 April 1965 and was inactivated on 25 June 1965.

== Lineage ==
- Constituted as the 551st Bombardment Squadron (Heavy) on 25 November 1942

Activated on 1 December 1942
Redesignated 551st Bombardment Squadron, Heavy on 20 August 1943
Inactivated on 28 August 1945

- Redesignated 551st Bombardment Squadron, Very Heavy on 25 August 1947

Activated in the reserve on 15 September 1947
Inactivated on 27 June 1949

- Redesignated 551st Strategic Missile Squadron (ICBM-Atlas) and activated on 24 October 1960 (not organized)

Organized on 1 April 1961
Inactivated on 25 June 1965

=== Assignments ===
- 385th Bombardment Group, 1 December 1942 – 28 August 1945
- Second Air Force, 15 September 1947
- Tenth Air Force, 1 July 1948
- First Air Force, 15 August 1948
- Tenth Air Force, 1 December 1948 – 27 June 1949
- Strategic Air Command, 24 October 1960 (not organized)
- 818th Air Division (later 818th Strategic Aerospace Division), 1 April 1961
- 98th Strategic Aerospace Wing, 1 January 1964 – 25 June 1965 (Note: In a typographical error, Ravenstein lists the unit as the 515th Strategic Missile Squadron. Ravenstein, p. 139.)

=== Stations ===
- Davis-Monthan Field, Arizona, 1 December 1942
- El Paso Army Air Field, Texas, 4 January 1943
- Geiger Field, Washington. 1 February 1943
- Great Falls Army Air Base, Montana, 11 March – 7 June 1943
- RAF Great Ashfield (AAF-155), England, 29 June 1943 – 6 August 1945
- Sioux Falls Army Air Field, South Dakota, 14–28 August 1945
- Selfridge Field (later Selfridge Air Force Base), Michigan, 15 September 1947 – 27 June 1949
- Lincoln Air Force Base, Nebraska, 1 April 1961 – 25 June 1965

=== Aircraft and missiles ===
- Boeing B-17 Flying Fortress, 1942–1945
- Convair SM-65F Atlas, 1961–1965

=== Awards and campaigns ===
Award streamer	Award	Dates	Notes
	Distinguished Unit Citation	17 August 1943	Germany, 551st Bombardment Squadron
	Distinguished Unit Citation	12 May 1944	Zwickau, Germany 551st Bombardment Squadron

Campaign Streamer	Campaign	Dates	Notes
	Air Offensive, Europe	29 June 1943 – 5 June 1944	551st Bombardment Squadron
	Air Combat, EAME Theater	29 June 1943 – 11 May 1945	551st Bombardment Squadron
	Normandy	6 June 1944 – 24 July 1944	551st Bombardment Squadron
	Northern France	25 July 1944 – 14 September 1944	551st Bombardment Squadron
	Rhineland	15 September 1944 – 21 March 1945	551st Bombardment Squadron
	Ardennes-Alsace	16 December 1944 – 25 January 1945	551st Bombardment Squadron
	Central Europe	22 March 1944 – 21 May 1945	551st Bombardment Squadron

== See also ==
- List of United States Air Force missile squadrons
- B-17 Flying Fortress units of the United States Army Air Forces
