= 818th Strategic Aerospace Division =

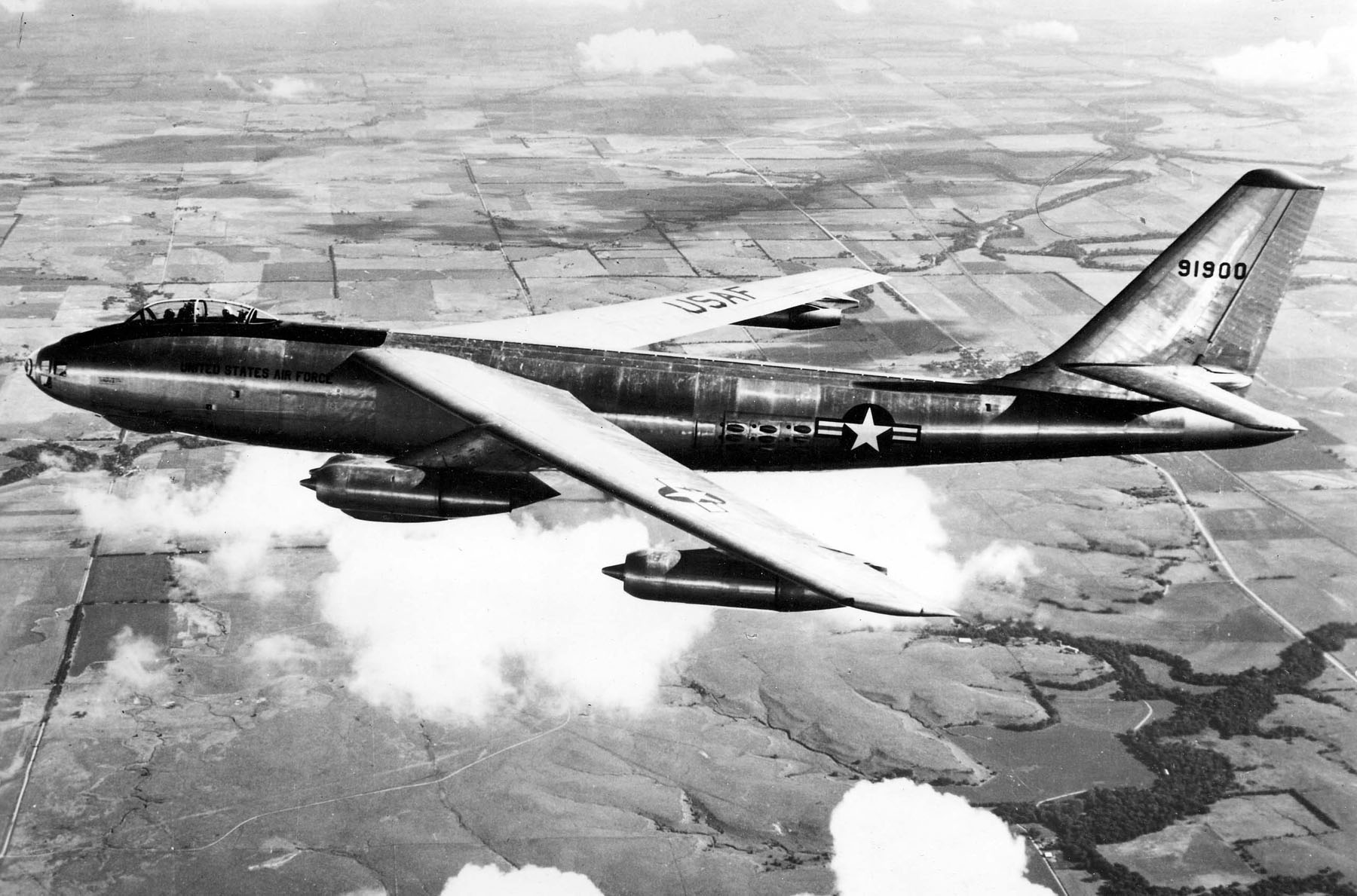
- Boeing B-47, the primary strike aircraft of the 818th SAD
- Active: 1954–1965
- Country: United States
- Branch: United States Air Force
- Role: Command of strategic strike forces

Insignia
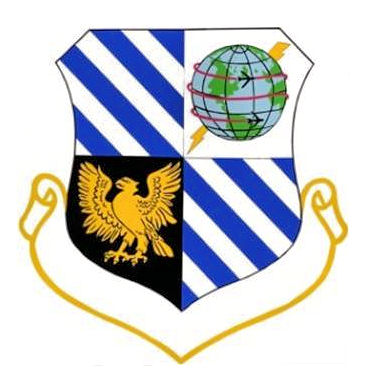
- Emblem of the 818th Strategic Aerospace Division emblem (Note: Approved 12 January 1956. Description: First and fourth quarters bendy of eight, azure and argent; the second quarter argent, over a lightning bolt in bend sinister, a sphere all proper, two aircraft volant sable with a trailing stream of power gules encircling the sphere; third quarter sable an eagle rising, wings elevated and displayed or.)

The 818th Strategic Aerospace Division is an inactive United States Air Force organization. Its last assignment was with Strategic Air Command at Lincoln Air Force Base, Nebraska, where it was inactivated on 25 March 1965.

The division was activated at Lincoln in 1954 as the 818th Air Division to provide a single headquarters for the base as the 98th and 307th Bombardment Wings returned from Korean War operations with the Boeing B-29 Superfortress and prepared to convert to the Boeing B-47 Stratojet. From 1962 until 1964 the division also commanded a wing at Offutt Air Force Base, Nebraska. In 1962, the division assumed responsibility for a Post Attack Command and Control System squadron operating Boeing B-47 Stratojets. One month later, it was also assigned Offutt based Boeing EC-135s. performing the similar Looking Glass Mission.

The division was inactivated when the 307th Bombardment Wing inactivated, leaving the 98th Bombardment Wing as the only SAC wing at Lincoln.

== History ==
In August 1954, Strategic Air Command (SAC) activated the 818th Air Division as the command headquarters for Lincoln Air Force Base, Nebraska in anticipation of the return in November of the 307th Bombardment Wing from Kadena Air Base, Okinawa, where it had been supporting Far East Air Forces in the Korean War. The 307th would join the 98th Bombardment Wing, which had moved to Lincoln in July 1954 from Yokota Air Base, Japan. The 98th's Boeing KC-97 Stratofreighters were already at Lincoln, and the two wings prepared to convert to Boeing B-47 Stratojets. The 818th Air Base Group was activated with the division, assuming responsibility for managing support activities at Lincoln from the 98th Air Base Group, which had arrived at Lincoln in November 1953 to reopen the former World War II base and prepare it for jet bomber operations.

The division was initially responsible to train its two wings for long range offensive bombardment and worldwide air refueling operations. The division participated in numerous tactical training exercises. The 98th Bombardment Wing deployed as a unit to RAF Lakenheath in late 1955. The 307th wing, which did not receive its first B-47s and KC-97s until 1955, also deployed as a unit to England in 1956.

In April 1960 the division conducted Exercise Open Road, testing Minimum Interval Takeoff of its KC-97s, with the planes departing every fifteen seconds. However, stationing slow moving KC-97s in Nebraska, near the center of North America, required them to be deployed to forward locations (Note: The division operated one of these locations in northern Manitoba, Canada.) and the tankers of the division began to be withdrawn. Although some consideration had been given to upgrading the division's refueling units to Boeing KC-135 Stratotankers in 1960, instead, the 307th Air Refueling Squadron moved to Selfridge Air Force Base in 1960 and the 98th Air Refueling Squadron was inactivated in 1963.

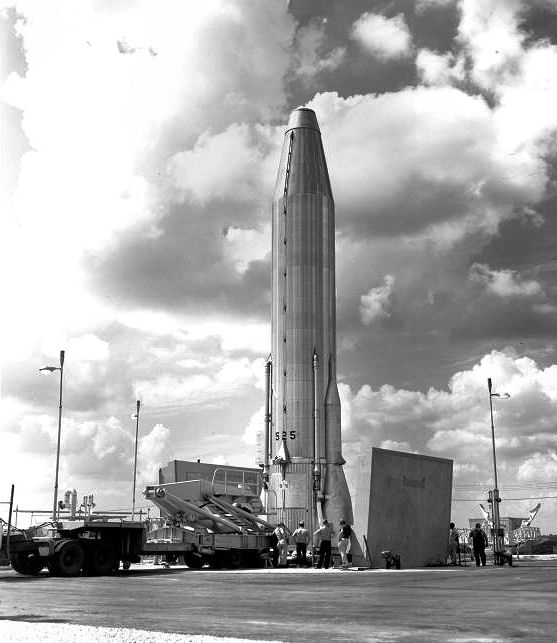
Atlas Missile of the 551st Strategic Missile Squadron

In the spring of 1961, the division was assigned the 551st Strategic Missile Squadron, an SM-65 Atlas intercontinental ballistic missile unit, although the squadron did not assume full responsibility for operation of the Atlas missile sites until the fall of 1962. In the spring of 1962 SAC units with responsibility for both bomber and missile forces were renamed to include the term "aerospace" in their designations. The 818th became the 818th Strategic Aerospace Division. In 1964 the 551st was reassigned to the 98th wing, which then became the 98th Strategic Aerospace Wing.

In July 1962, the 4362d Support Squadron, which operated EB-47s of the Post Attack Command and Control System (PACCS), was activated and assigned to the division. This squadron did not become operational until 31 July 1962. Although assigned to the division, it was attached to the 307th wing.

A month after the 4362d squadron was assigned to the division, the 4321st Strategic Wing at Offutt Air Force Base, Nebraska was reassigned from the 17th Strategic Aerospace Division. The 4321st commanded an air refueling squadron and a missile squadron. This wing's 34th Air Refueling Squadron also flew eight Boeing EC-135s, performing the Looking Glass mission, operating the airborne command post for SAC in addition to providing refueling support for Operation Chrome Dome, the Boeing B-52 Stratofortress airborne alert program.

In January 1963, The 385th Strategic Aerospace Wing assumed the aircraft, personnel and equipment of the discontinued 4321st wing. The 4321st was a Major Command controlled (MAJCON) wing, which could not carry a permanent history or lineage, and SAC wanted to replace it with a permanent unit. The 385th wing was active for less than two years, however, and began to prepare for inactivation on 1 December 1964, when its Atlas missile squadron became non-operational and its missiles were transferred to the San Bernardino Air Materiel Area. The 34th Air Refueling Squadron was attached directly to the division. Two weeks later the 385th inactivated and the division's wings were once again all located at Lincoln.

The division was inactivated three months later as the phaseout of B-47s reduced Lincoln to a single wing. The 98th Bombardment Wing became the host at Lincoln and its 98th Combat Support Group took over the personnel, mission and equipment of the 818th Combat Support Group. The 98th wing and the 34th Air Refueling Squadron were transferred to the 810th Strategic Aerospace Division.

== Lineage ==
- Constituted as the 818th Air Division on 27 August 1954

Activated on 11 October 1954
Redesignated 818th Strategic Aerospace Division on 1 March 1962
Discontinued and inactivated on 25 March 1965

=== Assignments ===
- Fifteenth Air Force, 11 October 1954
- Eighth Air Force, 1 July 1955
- Second Air Force, 1 January 1959 – 25 March 1965

=== Stations ===
- Lincoln Air Force Base, Nebraska, 11 October 1954 – 25 March 1965

=== Components ===
==== Wings ====
- 98th Bombardment Wing (later 98th Strategic Aerospace Wing): 11 October 1954 – 25 March 1965 (attached to 7th Air Division 11 November 1955 – 29 January 1956)
- 307th Bombardment Wing: 11 October 1954 – 25 March 1965 (attached to Twentieth Air Force until 19 November 1954 and to 7th Air Division 7 July 1956 – 5 October 1956)
- 385th Strategic Aerospace Wing: 1 January 1963 – 15 December 1964

Offutt Air Force Base, Nebraska

- 4321st Strategic Wing: 15 August 1962 – 1 January 1963

Offutt Air Force Base, Nebraska

==== Group ====
- 818th Air Base Group (later 818th Combat Support Group): 11 October 1954 – 25 March 1965
- 818th Medical Group: 1 September 1958 – 25 March 1965

==== Squadrons ====
- 34th Air Refueling Squadron: attached on 1 December 1964 and assigned from 15 December 1964 – 1 April 1965

Offutt Air Force Base, Nebraska

- 551st Strategic Missile Squadron: 1 April 1961 – 1 January 1964
- 3949th Air Base Squadron, c. 1 April 1960 – 15 August 1962

Churchill RCAF Station, Canada

- 4362d Support Squadron (later 4362d Post Attack Command Control Squadron): 20 July 1962 – 24 December 1964 (attached to 308th Bombardment Wing)

==== Other ====
- 4168th USAF Hospital: 1 February 1955 – 1 January 1958

=== Aircraft and Missiles ===
- Boeing B-47 Stratojet, 1954–1965
- Boeing EB-47 Stratojet 1962–1964
- Boeing KC-97 Stratofreighter 1954–1963
- Boeing KC-135 Stratotanker, 1962–1965
- Boeing EC-135, 1962–1965
- SM-65 Atlas, 1961–1964
- Sikorsky H-19 (Note: The H-19s and U-6s were assigned to the 818th Combat Support Group to support the Atlas missile sites of the 551st Strategic Missile Squadron. The exact dates of assignment are unclear, although the H-19s began to be phased out in July 1963.)
- de Havilland Canada U-6A Beaver
- Mission support aircraft also included C-45G, C-45H, C-47, C-119 and B-25

== See also ==
- List of United States Air Force air divisions
- List of USAF Bomb Wings and Wings assigned to Strategic Air Command
- List of USAF Strategic Wings assigned to the Strategic Air Command
- List of B-47 units of the United States Air Force
