= Nevada Test and Training Range (military unit) =

Nevada Test and Training Range

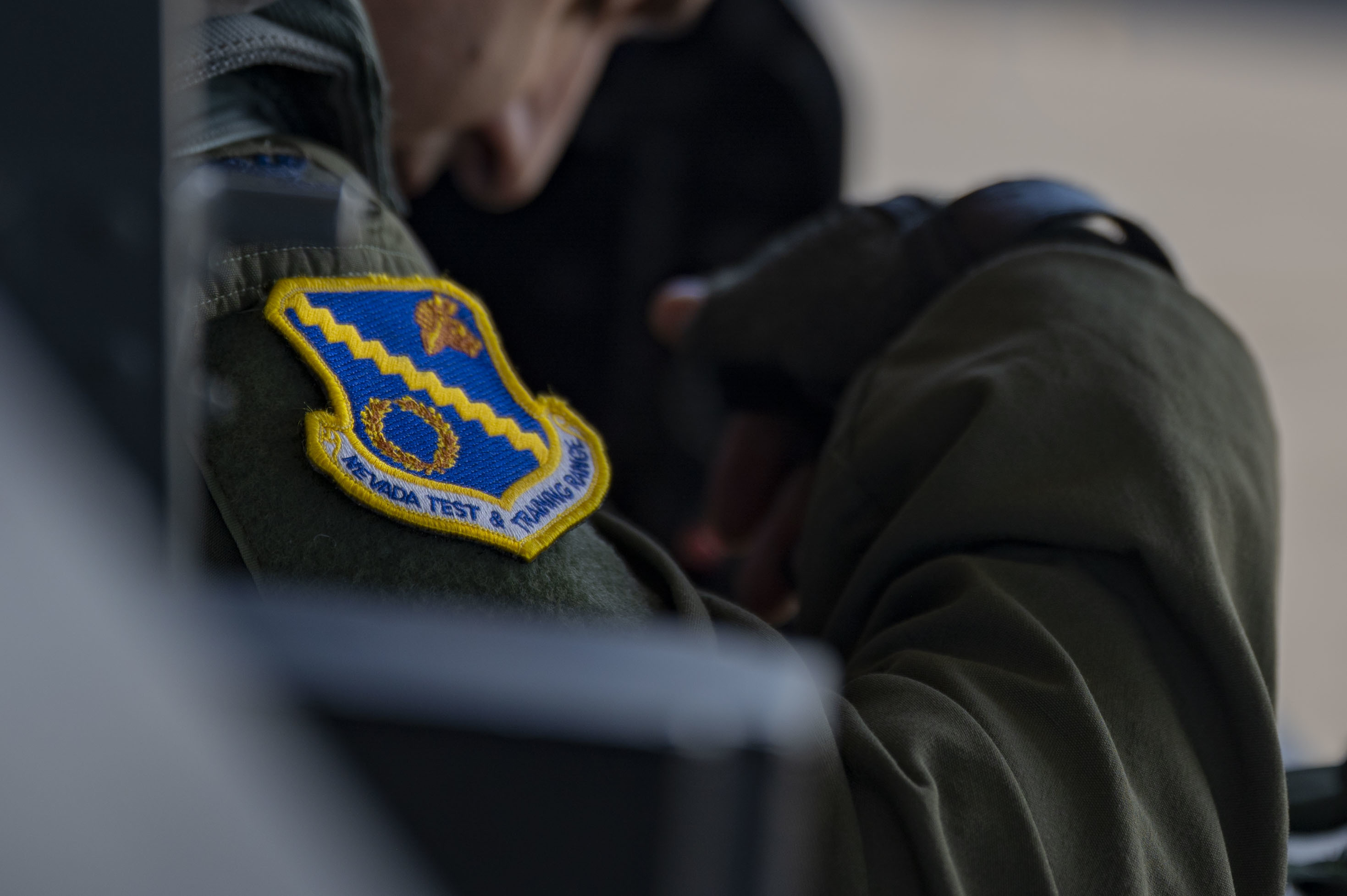
- The unit's patch on a pilot's flight suit in 2022
- Active: 1947–1948; 1948–1966; 1966–1976; 2001–present
- Country: United States
- Branch: United States Air Force
- Role: Range operation
- Part of: Air Combat Command: United States Air Force Warfare Center
- Garrison/HQ: Nellis Air Force Base, Nevada
- Nickname: Pyramidiers
- Motto: Force for Freedom
- Engagements: Korean War
- Decorations: Distinguished Unit Citation; Air Force Outstanding Unit Award; Republic of Korea Presidential Unit Citation

Commanders
- Current commander: Colonel Michael G. Rider

Insignia
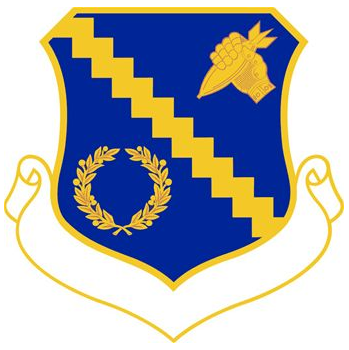
- Nevada Test and Training Range emblem

The Nevada Test and Training Range is a United States Air Force unit assigned to the United States Air Force Warfare Center of Air Combat Command. The unit is stationed at Nellis Air Force Base, Nevada as a tenant unit.

The NTTR controls and operates the Nevada Test and Training Range (NTTR). The commander coordinates, prioritizes and is the approval authority for activities involving other governmental agencies, departments and commercial activities on the NTTR. The NTTR integrates and provides support for test and training programs that have a direct effect on the war-fighting capabilities of the combat air forces.

The history of the NTTR can be traced to the 98th Bombardment Wing, although the history and honors of the 98th Bombardment Group have been temporarilybestowed on the range. The group flew a total of 417 missions and earning a total of 15 battle streamers as well as two Distinguished Unit Citations.

During the early years of the Cold War, the 98th Bombardment Wing, Very Heavy was formed in 1947 and assigned to Strategic Air Command. Further redesignations followed as the wing mission changed, including the 98th Strategic Aerospace Wing when it added intercontinental ballistic missiles to its bomber force in 1964, and later the 98th Strategic Wing when it moved to Spain to control deployed Strategic Air Command (SAC) assets in 1966. The 98th Strategic Wing was inactivated on 31 December 1976 with the phaseout of SAC operations at Torrejon AB, Spain and its functions transferred to the 306th Strategic Wing at Ramstein Air Base, West Germany.

As of July 2022, the NTTR is commanded by Colonel Michael G. Rider.

== Organization ==
- Operations Directorate The directorate provides day-to-day control of the geographical NTTR. It has two divisions, Current Operations and Weapons. It supports Air Force, joint and multi-national test and training activities, and operates the geographic NTTR and Leach Lake Tactics Range near Barstow, Calif. It prioritizes and schedules all range activities for all range users, provides ground control intercept operations, flight-following safety deconfliction, simulated threat command and control operations, communications, data link operations, and range access control. It also assists test customers by coordinating support activities, and coordinates airspace issues with military and federal agencies.
- Mission Support Directorate The directorate provides base operating support on the 3-million-acre (12,000 km^{2}) Nevada Test and Training Range with contingents at three geographically separated operations and maintenance compounds, including Tonopah Electronic Combat Range, Point Bravo Electronic Combat Combat Range and Tolicha Peak Electronic Combat Range. It provides limited operational support at Creech Air Force Base and the Tonopah Test Range. It supports training operations of the 99th Ground Combat Training Squadron, 12th Combat Training Squadron, and 549th Combat Training Squadron.
- Financial Management Directorate The directorate manages and executes the NTTR budget. It monitors and collects reimbursements for major range and test facility base activities from customers.
- Safety Directorate The directorate is responsible for managing the commander's safety and mishap reporting programs. It is organized into functional areas including ground safety, weapons safety and range safety.
- Program Management Directorate The directorate is acquires and manages contract support of range operations, maintenance, instrumentation, communications, and computer systems services. It directs contract changes and evaluates contractor performance.
- Plans and Programs Directorate The directorate focuses on range requirements and long-term strategic planning. It is responsible for interaction of new systems being developed and implemented into the NTTR. In addition, the directorate oversees environmental management, agreements, land use, and range environmental contractors on the NTTR and Leach Lake Training Range, and is the liaison to the Bureau of Land Management, the Department of the Interior, and other state and federal agencies.
- Range Support Directorate The directorate provided day-to-day communications, electronic combat and instrumentation of the geographical NTTR and LTTR. It has three divisions: communications/computer services, operations and maintenance, and engineering. It provides technical support of Air Force, joint and multi-national aircrew training missions on the NTTR. The directorate supports all electronic combat activities while providing ground control intercept operations, simulated threat command and control operations, and the range's simulated Integrated Air Defense System.
- Security Directorate The directorate manages all facets of information, personnel, industrial, and resource protection security programs. Additionally, the Program Security Office ensures all visitors to the NTTR meet security requirements, and provides security oversight for classified and special access requirements on the NTTR.

== History ==
=== Organization and Korean War ===
During the early years of the Cold War, the 98th Bombardment Wing, Very Heavy was formed 24 October 1947 as part of the Air Force's experimental wing base (Hobson Plan) reorganization and assigned to Strategic Air Command. The 98th Wingwas discontinued on 12 July 1948, and replaced by the 98th Bombardment Wing, Medium the same day when the test was deemed successful and the organization made permanent. From November 1947 to July 1948 and July 1948 to July 1954, the wing headquarters was often manned as a "paper" unit with most of its components attached to other establishments for long periods. The wing's tactical group was operational, but under control of other organizations from November 1947 to April 1950 and again from August 1950 through March 1951.

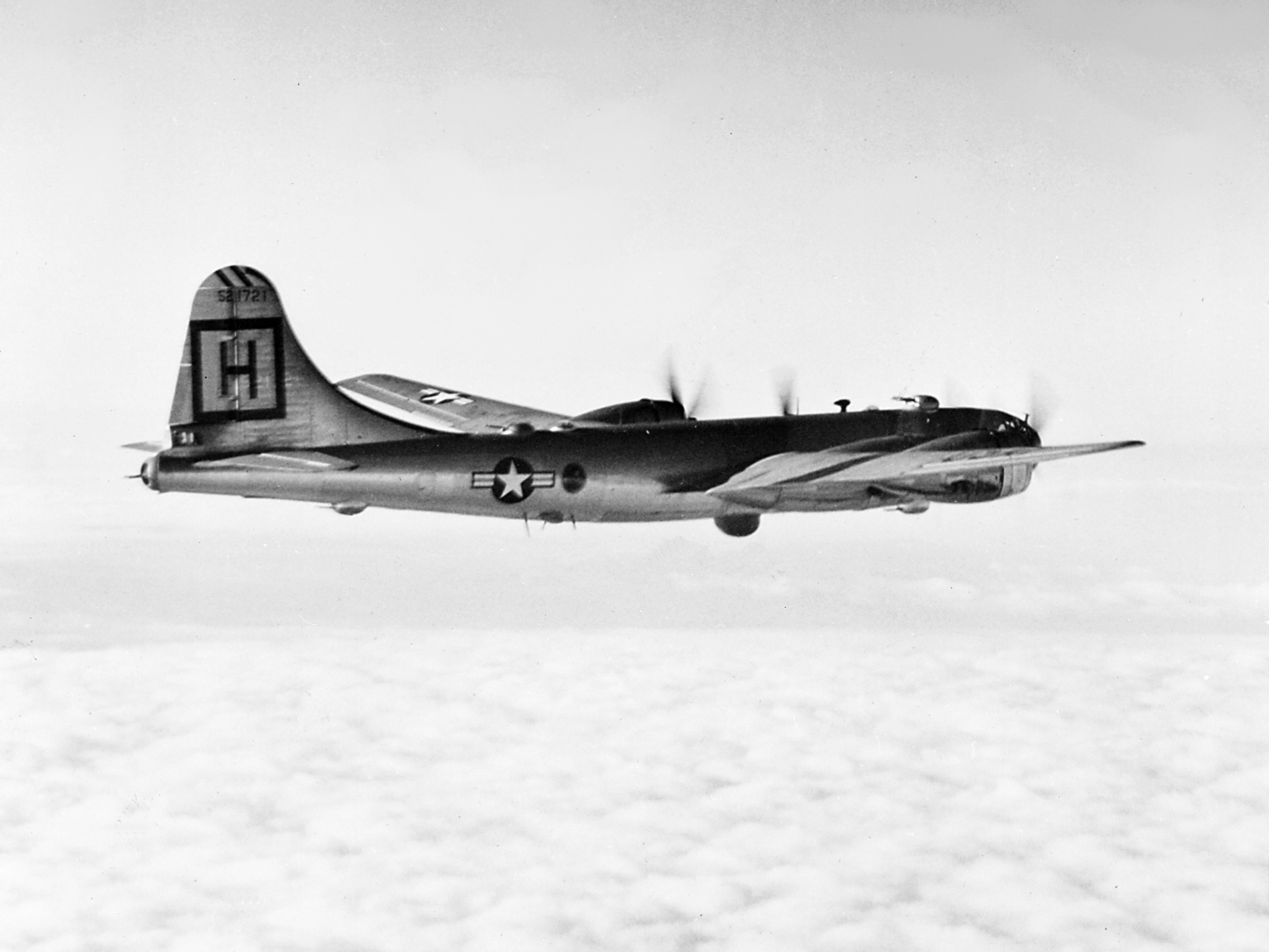
98th Bomb Wing B-29 over Korea

On 1 April 1951, wing headquarters deployed to Japan to assume control over combat operations of the group's three tactical squadrons, (Note: Ironically, at this time it was the group that became a paper unit.) while the rest of the wing remained behind in Washington. In 1952, the combat squadrons were joined by three maintenance squadrons. Wing combat missions in Korea included interdiction of enemy communications and support of United Nations ground forces. Its last combat mission flown 25 July 1953 and it dropped propaganda leaflets on the day of truce two days later.

During the Korean War, the squadrons of the 98th flew more than 5,000 sorties and dropped more than 40,000 tons of bombs (actual total unavailable). They earned a Distinguished Unit Citation, a Korean Presidential Unit Citation and 10 battle streamers. The 98th was credited with the destruction of 5 MiG 15 Jet Fighters and one propeller driven fighter. The 98th recorded 19 Boeing B-29 Superfortress losses from August 1950 to July 1954.

=== Cold War ===
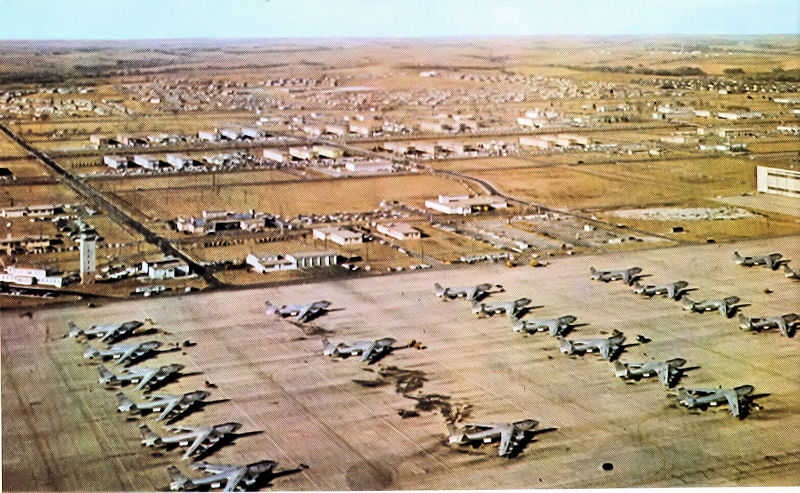
B-47s on the Ramp at Lincoln AFB

The wing remained at Yokota Air Base, Japan in combat-ready status for another year. Meanwhile, wing components not deployed in Japan moved to newly reopened Lincoln Air Force Base, Nebraska to supervise construction in preparation for movement there of the deployed wing components. The wing disposed of its B-29s at the "boneyard" at Davis-Monthan Air Force Base, Arizona. In July 1954, wing components concentrated at the wing's new base, (Note: This was the first time since 1947 that all wing components were under the wing's control at the same base.) but in October, the 98th gave up its host responsibilities at Lincoln to the 818th Air Division. Air refueling operations were already underway by then. The wing's squadrons began receiving new Boeing B-47E Stratojet swept-wing medium bombers in January 1955, capable of flying at high subsonic speeds and primarily designed for penetrating the airspace of the Soviet Union. At this point the wing began an intensive training program to convert to combat ready status as soon as possible. This was achieved in April 1955.

During next decade, the wing participated in Strategic Air Command's worldwide bombardment training and air refueling commitments. The wing deployed to RAF Lakenheath, England from 11 November 1955 to 29 January 1956. Starting in 1960, the wing maintained B-47s on ground alert 24 hours a day. From January 1964 to April 1965, the wing also controlled an SM-65 Atlas intercontinental ballistic missile squadron and was redesignated as the 98th Strategic Aerospace Wing. In the early 1960s, the B-47 was considered to be reaching obsolescence, and was being phased out of SAC's strategic arsenal. Beginning in 1964, the wing began sending its aircraft to Davis-Monthan Air Force Base. Lincoln was closed and the wing inactivated in 1966.

=== European Mission ===
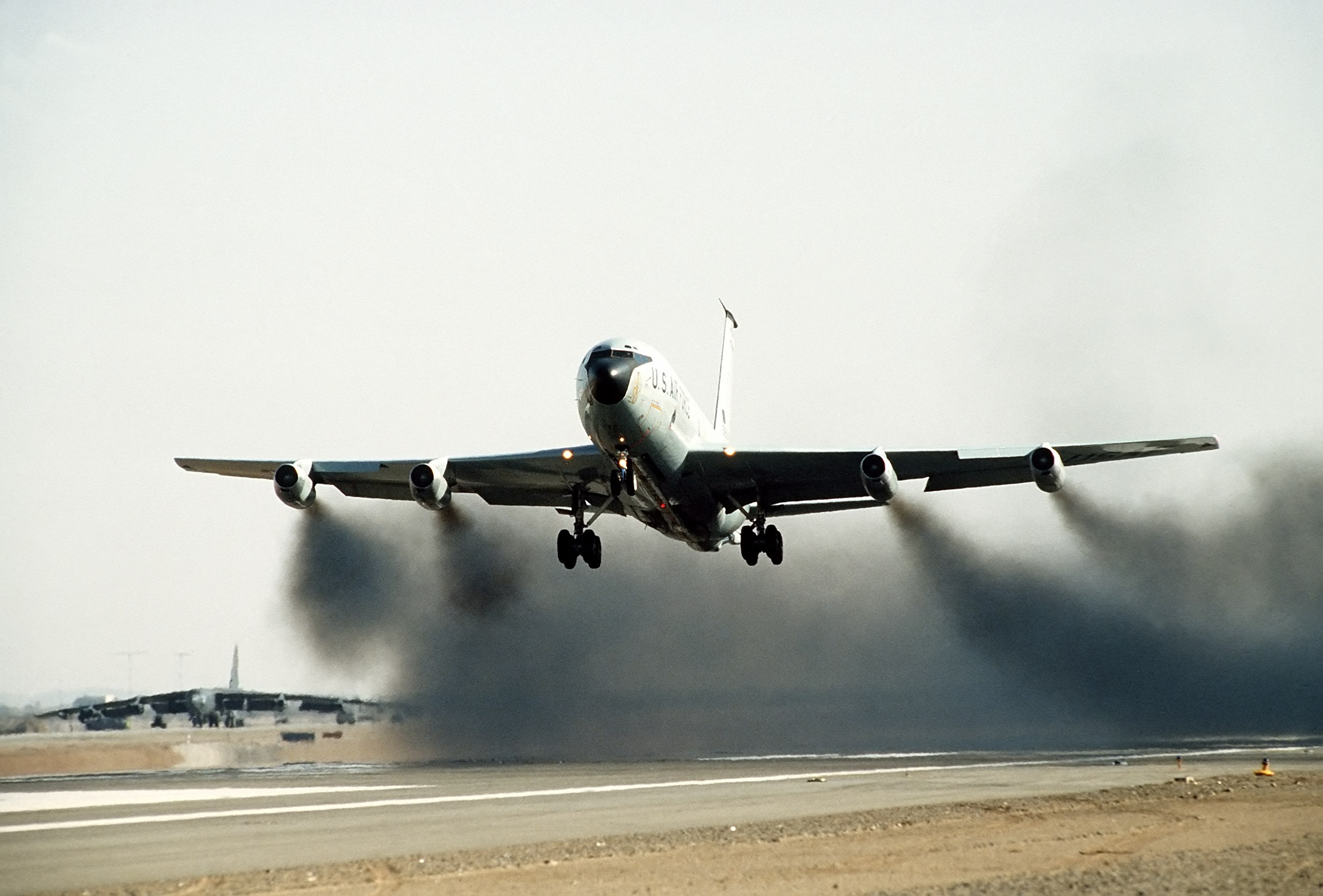
KC-135 on takeoff

The wing was inactivated on 25 June 1966 at Lincoln, but activated the same day at Torrejon Air Base, Spain replacing the 3970th Strategic Wing. The 3970th had been established on 1 July 1957 at Torrejon as the 3970th Air Base Group to support B-47 and KC-135 elements from SAC CONUS-based units deployed to Europe as part of Operation Reflex deployments and provide a refueling mission to United States Air Forces Europe (USAFE) tactical fighters. Until 1 April 1966, when SAC transferred Torrejon to USAFE, the 3970th also acted as the host base organization for all USAF units at Torrejon. The group was assigned seven support squadrons and a hospital to carry out its mission. It was redesignated the 3970th Combat Support Group on 1 June 1959 and upgraded to wing status on 1 February 1964.

In 1966, SAC received authority from Headquarters USAF to discontinue the 3970th Wing (a MAJCON wing) and activate an AFCON wing which could continue the lineage and history of a combat wing. On 5 June 1966, the 3970th was replaced by the 98th Strategic Wing, which assumed the personnel, equipment, and mission of the 3970th Strategic Wing. For the next decade, the 98th had no tactical aircraft components assigned to it, but rather used attached Boeing KC-135 Stratotankers and crews furnished by other SAC wings to provide air refueling support for the operational, alert exercise commitment of SAC, Tactical Air Command, USAFE and NATO. These aircraft were deployed on temporary duty as the Spanish Tanker Task Force. The wing's operational area included the Eastern Atlantic Ocean, most of Europe, North Africa and the Middle East.

The wing maintained a detachment at RAF Upper Heyford (relocated to RAF Mildenhall in April 1970) supporting RC-135 reconnaissance aircraft, and supporting KC-135 Tankers deployed from the Spanish Tanker Task Force. In October 1976, the 306th Strategic Wing, based at Ramstein Air Base, West Germany assumed this support task and the 98th phased down at Torrejon and was inactivated 31 December 1976.

=== Post Cold War ===
In October 2001, the wing was redesignated the 98th Range Wing and began operating the range facilities of the Air Warfare Center from Nellis Air Force Base, Nevada. It replaced the 99th Range Group and 99th Range Squadron of the host unit at Nellis, the 99th Air Base Wing. Its mission is to provide a flexible and realistic "battle space" to support training, testing, and tactics development, for which it controls the airspace over 12,000 square nautical miles, 7,000 of which are shared with civilian aircraft.

The NTTR supports Department of Defense (DOD) advanced composite force training, tactics development, and electronic combat testing as well as DOD and Department of Energy testing, research, and development. It acts as the single point of contact for range customers.

In June 2011, the wing was redesignated Nevada Test and Training Range and its operational groups were replaced by directorates. Then on 1 April 2013, the 25th Space Range Squadron was moved under the NTTR from Air Force Space Command. The 25th operates and maintains the Space Test and Training Range. On 24 July 2020 the 25th was transferred to the United States Space Force.

== Lineage ==
98th Bombardment Wing, Very Heavy

- Designated as 98th Bombardment Wing, Very Heavy on 24 October 1947.

Organized on 10 November 1947.
Discontinued on 12 July 1948.
Consolidated with the 98th Strategic Wing as the 98th Strategic Wing on 1 October 1984

Nevada Test and Training Range

- Constituted as 98th Bombardment Wing, Medium on 28 May 1948 (Note: The wing remained equipped with B-29s, but with the advent of the Convair B-36 Peacemaker, the B-29 was reclassified from a Very Heavy bomber to a Medium bomber.)

Activated on 12 July 1948.
Redesignated 98th Strategic Aerospace Wing on 1 February 1964.
Discontinued and inactivated on 25 June 1966

- Redesignated 98th Strategic Wing, activated, and organized, on 25 June 1966

Inactivated on 31 December 1976
Consolidated with the 98th Bombardment Wing, Very Heavy on 1 October 1984
Redesignated 98th Range Wing on 21 September 2001
Activated on 29 October 2001
Redesignated Nevada Test and Training Range on 21 June 2011

=== Assignments ===
- Fifteenth Air Force, 10 November 1947 (attached to 92d Bombardment Wing, 17 November 1947 – 15 April 1950)
- Second Air Force, 16 May 1950 (attached to 92d Bombardment Wing)
- Fifteenth Air Force, 28 July 1950 (attached to 92d Bombardment Wing through 31 March 1951 then Far East Air Forces Bomber Command, Provisional from and rear echelon attached to 92d Air Base Group)
- 57th Air Division, 16 April 1951 (Far East Air Forces Bomber Command, Provisional. Rear echelon attached to 92 Air Base Group to 25 July 1952)
- Fifteenth Air Force, 25 November 1953 (remained attached to FEAF Bomber Command, Provisional, through 17 June 1954, Twentieth Air Force, 18 June-25 July 1954
- 818th Air Division (later 818 Strategic Aerospace Division), 11 October 1954 (attached to 7th Air Division when deployed 11 November 1955 – 29 January 1956)
- 810th Strategic Aerospace Division, 25 March 1965 – 25 June 1966
- Strategic Air Command, 25 June 1966 – 31 December 1976
- Air Warfare Center, 29 October 2001 – present

=== Stations ===
- Spokane Army Air Field (later Spokane Air Force Base; Fairchild Air Force Base), Washington, 10 November 1947 – 15 August 1953
- Yokota Air Base, Japan, 15 August 1953 – 25 July 1954
- Lincoln Air Force Base, Nebraska, 25 July 1954 – 25 June 1966
- Torrejon Air Base, Spain, 25 June 1966 – 31 December 1976
- Nellis Air Force Base, Nevada, 29 October 2001 – present

=== Components ===
Groups

- 98th Airdrome Group (later 98th Air Base Group, 98th Mission Support Group), 10 November 1947 – 18 October 1954, 5 November 2001 – 21 June 2011 (detached 1 April 1951 – 25 November 1953)
- 98th Bombardment (later, 98th Air Refueling Group, 98th Operations Group): 10 November 1947 – 16 June 1952 (detached 10 November 1947 – 15 April 1950 and 2 August 1950 – 31 March 1951; not operational, 1 April 1951 – 16 June 1952); 29 October 2001 – 21 June 2011
- 98th Maintenance & Supply Group, 10 November 1947 – 16 February 1951, 14 February 1952 – 16 June 1952 (not operational)
- 98th Station Medical Group (later 98th Medical Group, 98th Medical Squadron, 98th Medical Group, 98th Tactical Hospital), 10 November 1947 – 1 September 1958 (detached 1 April 1951 – 25 November 1953)

Operational Squadrons

- 98th Air Refueling Squadron: 16 June 1952 – 1 July 1953 (detached); 18 February 1954 – 15 April 1963 (detached 18 February-31 July 1954, 7 January-21 February 1955, 27 December 1956 – 14 March 1957, 28 December 1957 – 25 March 1958, 1 April-c. 8 July 1959, 2 October 1962 – 7 January 1963)
- 307th Air Refueling Squadron: attached 8 November 1954 – 1 February 1955
- 343d Bombardment Squadron: attached 1 April 1951 – 15 June 1952, assigned 16 June 1952 – 25 June 1966 (not operational, 8 December 1965 – 25 June 1966)
- 344th Bombardment Squadron: attached 1 April 1951 – 15 June 1952, assigned 16 June 1952 – 25 June 1966 (not operational, 8 December 1965 – 25 June 1966)
- 345th Bombardment Squadron: attached 1 April 1951 – 15 June 1952, assigned 16 June 1952 – 25 June 1966 (not operational, 8 December 1965 – 25 June 1966)
- 380th Air Refueling Squadron: attached 1 August-8 November 1954
- 415th Bombardment Squadron: 1 September 1958 – 1 January 1962
- 551st Strategic Missile Squadron: 1 January 1964 – 25 June 1965.

Support Squadrons

- 98th Armament & Electronics Maintenance Squadron, 16 June 1952 – 25 June 1966
- 98th Maintenance Squadron (later 98th Field Maintenance Squadron), 16 February 1951 – 10 February 1952 (detached), 16 June 1952 – 25 June 1966
- 98th Northern Range Support Squadron, 1 August 2005 – 21 June 2011
- 98th Periodic Maintenance Squadron (later 98th Organizational Maintenance Squadron), 16 June 1952 – 25 June 1966
- 98th Range Squadron, 5 November 2001 – 21 June 2011
- 98th Range Support Squadron, 5 November 2001 – 1 August 2005
- 98th Southern Range Support Squadron, 1 August 2005 – 21 June 2011

Detachments

- Detachment 1, 98th Strategic Wing 25 June 1966 – 31 March 1970

RAF Upper Heyford, United Kingdom

- Detachment 1, 98th Strategic Wing 1 April 1970 – 31 December 1976

RAF Mildenhall, United Kingdom

=== Aircraft and missiles ===
- Boeing B-29 Superfortress (1950–1954)
- Boeing KC-97 Stratofreighter (1954–1963)
- Boeing B-47E Stratojet (1955–1965)
- SM-65F Atlas (1964–1965)
- Boeing RC-135 (1966–1976)
- Detachment 1 Operations
- Boeing RC-135(1966–1976)
- Boeing KC-135 Stratotanker (1966–1976) Reconnaissance Aircraft Support

=== Awards ===
- Distinguished Unit Citation

Korea, 1 December 1952 – 30 April 1953
North Africa and Sicily, August 1942 – 17 August 1943
Ploesti, Rumania, 1 August 1943

- Air Force Outstanding Unit Award

1 July 1964 – 1 June 1965
1 January 1970 – 31 March 1971
1 July 1974 – 30 June 1976

- Korean Presidential Unit Citation

1 April 1951 – 27 July 1953

- Korean Service Medal
- Campaigns:

First UN Counteroffensive
CCF Spring Offensive
UN Summer-Fall Offensive
Second Korean Winter

Korea Summer-Fall 1952
Third Korean Winger
Korea Summer-Fall 1953

- Mediterranean Theater of Operations
- Campaigns

Egypt-Libya
Tunisia
Sicily
Naples-Foggia
Anzio

Rome-Arno
Southern France
North Apennines
Po Valley
Air Offensive, Europe

Normandy
Northern France
Rhineland
Central Europe
Air Combat, EAME Theater

== See also ==
- List of MAJCOM wings of the United States Air Force
- List of B-47 units of the United States Air Force
- 25th Space Range Squadron
- Space Test and Training Range
- Utah Test and Training Range
