= 385th Air Expeditionary Group =

385th Air Expeditionary Group

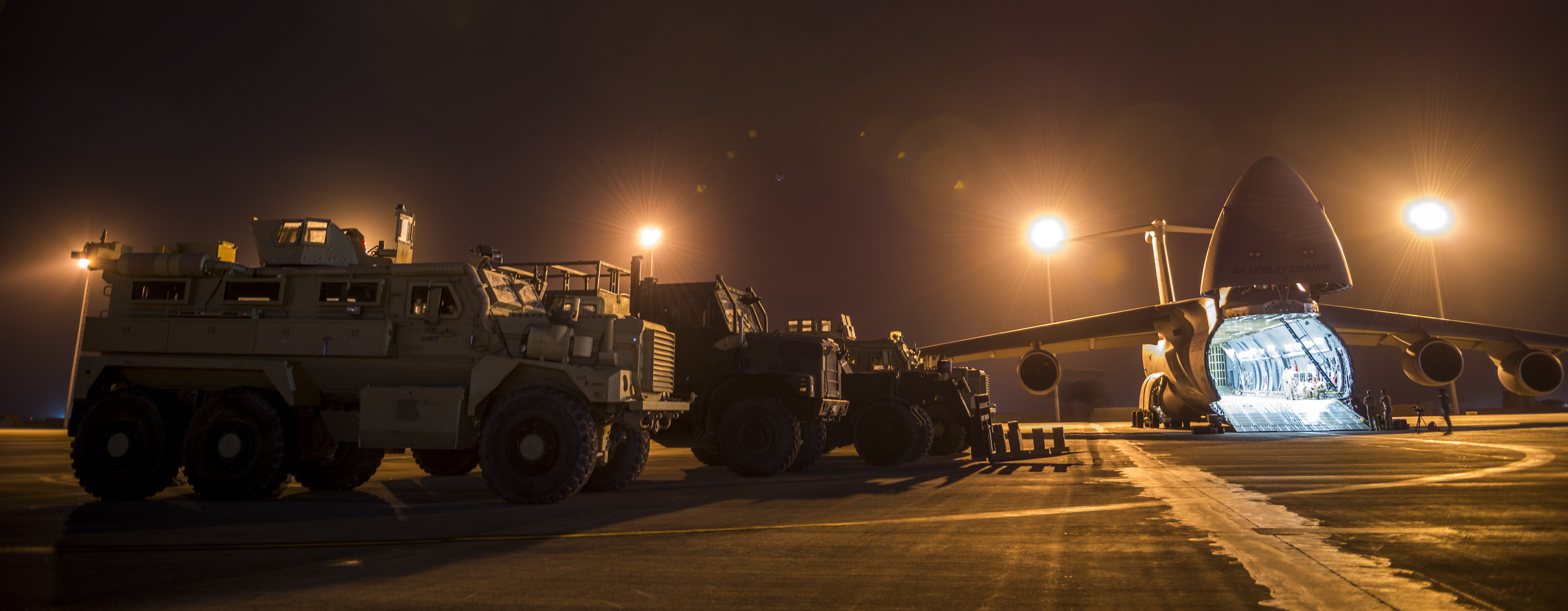
- Group airmen load cargo being withdrawn from Afghanistan
- Active: 1943–1945; 1963–1964; 2018–2022
- Country: United States
- Branch: United States Air Force
- Role: Expeditionary unit
- Part of: Air Mobility Command
- Garrison/HQ: Al Udeid AB, Qatar
- Nickname: Van's Valiants (World War II)
- Motto: Ales Victoria [sic] (Latin for 'Winged Victory')
- Engagements: European theater of World War II
- Decorations: Distinguished Unit Citation Gallant Unit Citation

Insignia
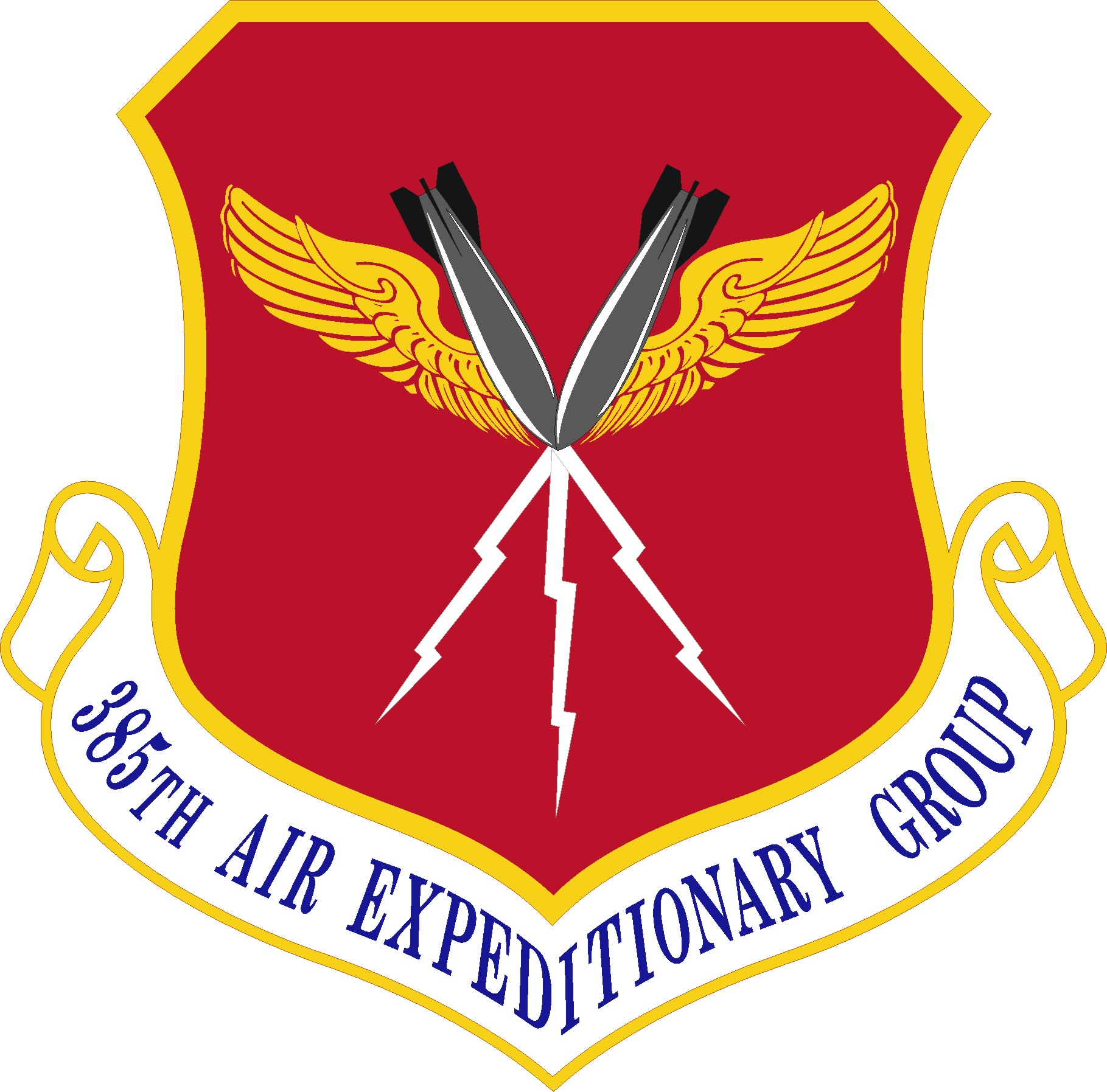
- 385 Air Expeditionary Group emblem

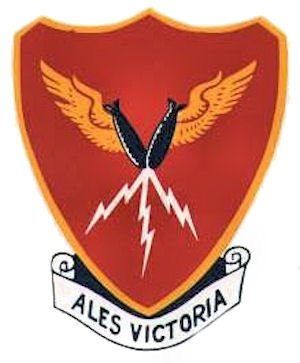
- 385th Bombardment Group emblem
- World War II Tail Code: Square G

The 385th Air Expeditionary Group is a provisional United States Air Force unit assigned to Air Mobility Command to activate or inactivate as needed. It was most recently a tenant unit of the 379th Air Expeditionary Wing at Al Udeid Air Base, Qatar.

During World War II, it was active as the 385th Bombardment Group, an Eighth Air Force Boeing B-17 Flying Fortress bomber unit, stationed at RAF Great Ashfield, England. The group led the famous attack on the Focke-Wulf Assembly Plant at Marienburg in East Prussia on 9 October 1943.

During the Cold War, the 385th Strategic Aerospace Wing was a Strategic Air Command (SAC) wing assigned to the 818th Strategic Aerospace Division at Offutt Air Force Base, Nebraska. It conducted strategic air refueling operations and kept intercontinental ballistic missiles (ICBMs) ready for launch. It also supported SAC's global air refueling mission until inactivated in 1964 as part of the phaseout of the SM-65 Atlas ICBM from the USAF inventory. It was inactivated on 15 December 1964.

== History ==
=== World War II ===
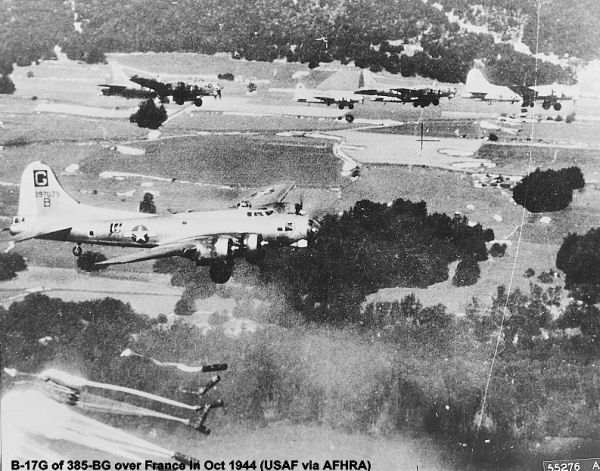
B-17s of the 385th Bomb Group on a parachute drop over France, October 1944. B-17G "Dozy Doats" visible in foreground.

The unit was constituted in late November 1942 as the 385th Bombardment Group and activated on 1 December 1943 at Davis–Monthan Field in Arizona. Its initial squadrons were the 548th, 549th, 550th, and 551st Bombardment Squadrons.

The group was formed in February 1943 at Geiger Field, Washington. It trained for two months and then moved to Great Falls Army Air Base, Montana in April 1943. The unit completed training at the end of May 1943 with the aircraft moving to Kearney Army Air Field, Nebraska prior to moving to England by the northern ferry route. Two aircraft were lost en route. The ground echelon left Great Falls on 8 June 1943. The 548th BS sailed on the RMS Queen Mary on 23 June 1943 and the other squadrons on the RMS Queen Elizabeth on 1 July 1943.

Under Eighth Air Force based in England, the 385th primarily bombed targets such as industrial areas, air bases, oil refineries, and communications centers in Germany, France, Poland, Belgium, the Netherlands, and Norway. The group received two Distinguished Unit Citations for bombing an aircraft factory at Regensburg on 17 August 1943 after a long hazardous flight over enemy territory. The group led the 4th Bombardment Wing a great distance through heavy and damaging opposition for the successful bombardment of an aircraft repair plant at Zwickau on 12 May 1944, being awarded another DUC for this performance. Other strategic targets included aircraft factories in Oschersleben and Marienburg, battery works in Stuttgart, airfields in Beauvais and Chartres, oil refineries in Ludwigshafen and Merseburg, and marshalling yards in Munich and Oranienburg.

The 385th sometimes supported ground forces, flying interdiction missions. It attacked coastal defenses in June 1944 in preparation for the Normandy invasion and hit marshalling yards and choke points during the landing on D-Day. The group bombed enemy positions in support of ground forces at Saint-Lô in July 1944. Attacked German communications and fortifications during the Battle of the Bulge, December 1944 – January 1945. It bombed troop concentrations and communications centers in Germany and France, March–April 1945, to assist the final thrust into Germany.

On 6 March 1944 raid to Berlin (the most costly mission the Eighth ever carried out) the 3d Bombardment Division commander, Brigadier General Russell Wilson, took off from Great Ashfield in a radar-equipped B-17 in a leading group of the 385th. All of the group's aircraft returned safely ... all, that is, except the one carrying General Wilson. which was seen to take several hits from flak. setting one engine on fire. Although four of the crew managed to parachute to safety (including Medal of Honor hero First Lieutenant John C. Morgan), eight of the others were killed when the bomber exploded.

In May 1945 the group dropped food to the starving Dutch population in the Netherlands as part of Operation Chowhound. The 385th suffered the last enemy action in the European part of the war. On 2 May 1945, a B-17 of the 385th BG was struck by enemy ground fire while on Operation Chowhound but returned safely to base. This was the last credited combat mission of the war.

After V-E Day, the 385th Bomb Group hauled displaced French slave laborers from Austria to France. It redeployed to the United States in June and August 1945. The aircraft left between 19 June, and 29 June 1945. the ground unit left on 4 August 1945, and sailed on the Queen Elizabeth from Greenock on 5 August 1945. They arrived in New York on 11 August 1945. The group was then established at Sioux Falls Army Air Field, South Dakota and inactivated on 28 August 1945.

=== Cold War ===
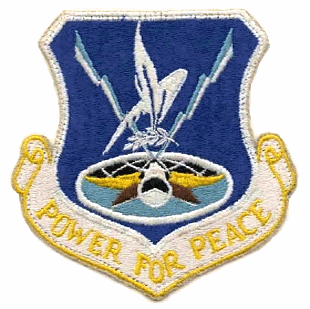
Emblem of the 4321st Strategic Wing

The origins of the 385th Strategic Aerospace Wing began on 15 August 1959 when Strategic Air Command (SAC) activated the 566th Strategic Missile Squadron (SMS) at Offutt Air Force Base and assigned it to Second Air Force. The squadron was equipped with SM-65 Atlas-Ds. Six weeks later, on 1 October 1959, SAC established the 4321st Strategic Wing at Offutt and assigned it to the 17th Air Division (later Strategic Aerospace Division) as an operational headquarters for the 566th and for the 34th Air Refueling Squadron, flying Boeing KC-135 Stratotankers. The 34th had been stationed at Offutt since the fall of 1958, but was assigned to a wing located at Whiteman Air Force Base, Missouri.

The wing's missiles were maintained on alert and ready for combat. The 4321st (and later the 385th) continued to maintain an alert commitment until inactivating. In August 1962, the 4321st was reassigned to the 818th Strategic Aerospace Division. However, SAC Strategic Wings could not carry a permanent history or lineage and SAC looked for a way to make its Strategic Wings permanent.

In 1962, in order to perpetuate the lineage of many currently inactive bombardment units with illustrious World War II records, Headquarters SAC received authority from Headquarters USAF to discontinue its Major Command controlled (MAJCON) strategic wings that were equipped with combat aircraft and to activate Air Force controlled (AFCON) units, most of which were inactive at the time which could carry a lineage and history. (Note: MAJCON units could not carry a permanent history or lineage. Ravenstein, Guide to Air Force Lineage and Honors, p. 12.) As a result the 4321st was replaced by the newly constituted 385th Strategic Aerospace Wing, which assumed its mission, personnel, and equipment on 1 January 1963. (Note: Although the 385th Wing was a new organization, it continued, through temporary bestowal, the history, and honors of the World War II 385th Bombardment Group. It was also entitled to retain the honors (but not the history or lineage) of the 4321st. This temporary bestowal ended in January 1984, when the wing and group were consolidated into a single unit.) In the same way the 549th Strategic Missile Squadron, one of the unit's World War II historical bomb squadrons, replaced the 566th. (Note: This was a paper swap of unit designations. The 549th was active at Francis E. Warren Air Force Base, Wyoming. It moved to Offutt and assumed the mission, personnel and equipment of the 566th, which moved to Warren and took over those of the 549th.) The 34th Air Refueling Squadron was reassigned to the 385th. Because the new organization controlled a combination of aircraft and intercontinental ballistic missiles it added "Aerospace" to the 4321st's designation.

The 385th continued to conduct strategic air refueling operations and maintain ICBM readiness to meet SAC commitments. The wing served as a deterrent force and also supported SAC's global air refueling mission. It was inactivated on 15 December 1964.

The wing and group were consolidated in 1985. In 2001, the consolidated unit was redesignated the 385th Air Epeditionary Group, converted to provisional status and assigned to Air Mobillity Command (AMC) to activate or inactivate as needed. It was active at Al udeid Air Base, Qatar from 2018 to 2022. The unit was awarded a Gallant Unit Citation for its actions during Operation Allies Refuge in Kabul, Afghanistan. The unit airlifted vulnerable Afghans over the course of 17 days, culminating in the largest evacuation airlift in history. The group was the first AMC unit to receive this citation.

== Lineage ==
385th Bombardment Group

- Constituted as the 385th Bombardment Group (Heavy) on 25 November 1942

Activated on 1 December 1942.
Redesignated as the 385th Bombardment Group, Heavy on 11 August 1944
Inactivated on 28 August 1945
Consolidated on 31 January 1984 with the 385th Strategic Aerospace Wing as the 385th Strategic Aerospace Wing (remained inactive)

385th Air Expeditionary Group

- Constituted as the 385th Strategic Aerospace Wing on 15 November 1962 and activated (not organized)

Organized on 1 January 1963
Discontinued and inactivated on 15 December 1964
Consolidated on 31 January 1985 with the 385th Bombardment Group (remained inactive)
Redesignated 385th Air Expeditionary Group and converted to provisional status, on 12 June 2002.
Activated c. 14 May 2018
Inactivated on 1 May 2022

=== Assignments ===
- II Bomber Command, 1 December 1942
- Eighth Air Force, c. 6 July 1943
- VIII Bomber Command, c. 8 July 1943
- 4th Bombardment Wing (later 4th Combat Bombardment Wing), 12 July 1943 (attached to 401st Provisional Combat Bombardment Wing until 13 September 1943)
- 93d Combat Bombardment Wing, 17 February 1945
- 45th Combat Bombardment Wing, 24 May 1945
- 20th Bombardment Wing, 18 June 1945 – 28 August 1945
- Strategic Air Command, 14 November 1962 (not organized)
- 818th Strategic Aerospace Division, 1 January 1963 – 15 December 1964
- Air Mobility Command to activate or inactivate at any time after 12 June 2002

Unknown, c. 14 May 2018 – 1 May 2022

=== Components ===
Squadrons

- 34th Air Refueling Squadron, 1 January – 15 December 1964 (detached 10–15 December 1964)
- 548th Bombardment Squadron, 1 December 1942 – 19 June 1945
- 549th Bombardment (later Strategic Missile) Squadron, 1 December 1942 – 19 June 1945; 1 January 1963 – 15 December 1964 (not operational, 1–15 December 1964)
- 550th Bombardment Squadron, 1 December 1942 – 19 June 1945
- 551st Bombardment Squadron, 1 December 1942 – 19 June 1945
- 90th Expeditionary Air Refueling Squadron, c. 2005 – c. 15 March 201
- 817th Expeditionary Airlift Squadron, 2006 – c. 1 April 2014

=== Stations ===
- Davis–Monthan Field, Arizona, 1 December 1942
- Biggs Field, Texas, 21 December 1942
- Geiger Field, Washington, 1 February 1943
- Great Falls Army Air Base, Montana, 11 April – June 1943
- Great Ashfield (Station 155), England, June 1943 – August 1945
- Sioux Falls Army Air Field, South Dakota, – 28 August August 1945.
- Offutt Air Force Base, Nebraska, 1 January 1963 – 15 December 1964
- Incirlik Air Base, Turkey, 2002-unknown
- Al Udeid Air Base, Qatar, c. 14 May 2018 – 1 May 2022

=== Aircraft and missiles ===
- Boeing B-17 Flying Fortress, 1942–1945
- Boeing KC-135 Stratotanker, 1963–1964, 2002-unknown
- SM-65 Atlas D, 1963–1964
