= List of United States Air Force air divisions =

List of United States Air Force air divisions is a comprehensive and consolidated list of USAF Air Divisions.

Air Divisions 1–15

- 1st Strategic Aerospace Division
- Air Division, Provisional, 1 1962–1963 Homestead Air Force Base Cuban Missile Crisis
- 2nd Air Division
- Air Division, Provisional, 2 1962–1963 McCoy Air Force Base Cuban Missile Crisis
- 3rd Air Division
- 3rd Air Division, Provisional July–Aug 48 RAF Marham
- Air Division, Provisional, 3 1962–1963 MacDill Air Force Base Cuban Missile Crisis
- 4th Air Division
- 5th Air Division
- 6th Air Division
- 7th Air Division
- 8th Air Division
- 9th Space Division
- 10th Air Division
- 11th Air Division
- 12th Air Division
- 13th Strategic Missile Division
- 14th Air Division
- 14th Air Division (Provisional)
- 15th Air Division (Provisional)

Air Divisions 16–30

- 17th Air Division
- Air Division, Provisional, 17 1972–1975 U Tapao RTAB Operation Arc Light
- 17th Air Division (Provisional)
- 18th Strategic Aerospace Division
- 19th Air Division
- 20th Air Division
- 21st Air Division
- 22d Strategic Aerospace Division
- 23d Air Division
- 24th Air Division
- 25th Air Division
- 26th Air Division
- 27th Air Division
- 28th Air Division
- 29th Air Division
- 30th Air Division

Air Divisions 31–45

- 31st Air Division
- 32d Air Division
- 33d Air Division
- 34th Air Division
- 35th Air Division
- 36th Air Division
- 37th Air Division
- 38th Air Division
- 39th Air Division
- 40th Air Division
- 41st Air Division
- 42d Air Division
- 43d Air Division
- 44th Air Division
- 45th Air Division

Air Divisions 46–100

- 47th Air Division
- 49th Air Division
- 50th Air Division
- 57th Air Division
- Air Division, Provisional, 57 1972–1973 Andersen AFB Operation Arc Light
- 58th Air Division
- 64th Air Division
- 65th Air Division
- 69th Air Division
- 73d Air Division
- 76th Air Division
- 85th Air Division
- 86th Air Division
- 90th Air Division
- 91st Air Division
- 96th Air Division
- 100th Air Division

Air Divisions 101–500

- 301st Fighter Division, Provisional Aug–Sep 1948 Okinawa
- 302d Air Division
- 304th Air Division
- 305th Air Division
- 307th Air Division
- 309th Air Division
- 310th Air Division
- 311th Air Division
- 313th Air Division
- 314th Air Division
- 315th Air Division
- 316th Air Division
- 322d Air Division
- 323d Air Division
- 325th Air Division
- 326th Air Division
- 327th Air Division

Air Divisions 501–999

- 552d Airborne Warning and Control Division
- 801st Air Division
- 802d Air Division
- 806th Air Division
- 810th Strategic Aerospace Division
- Air Division, Provisional, 810 1972–1973 Minot AFB (organizational test)
- 813th Strategic Aerospace Division
- Air Division, Provisional, 813 June–July 54 Pinecastle AFB
- 816th Strategic Aerospace Division
- 817th Air Division
- 818th Strategic Aerospace Division
- 819th Strategic Aerospace Division
- 820th Strategic Aerospace Division
- 821st Strategic Aerospace Division
- 822d Air Division
- 823d Air Division
- 825th Strategic Aerospace Division
- 830th Air Division
- 831st Air Division
- 832d Air Division
- 833d Air Division
- 834th Air Division
- 835th Air Division
- 836th Air Division
- 837th Air Division
- 838th Air Division
- 839th Air Division
- 840th Air Division

Air Divisions 1000+

- 1610th Air Division (Provisional)
- 4310th Air Division
- Air Division, Provisional, 4400 1965–1966 Mountain Home AFB
- Air Division, Provisional, 4481 Jan–Jul 1964 England AFB
- 7217th Air Division
- 7749th Air Division, Provisional Jul–Sep 1948 Camp Lindsey, Germany

Air Divisions, named

- Air Division, Reserve, Provisional Oct–Nov 1958 Donaldson AFB (exercise command unit)
- Antilles Air Division 1948–1949 Ramey Air Force Base, PR
- Pine Cone Air Division Mar–Jul 1959 Shaw AFB (exercise command unit)
- USAF Southern Air Division
- Yukon Air Division Apr–Jun 1948 Ladd AFB
