= 810th Strategic Aerospace Division =

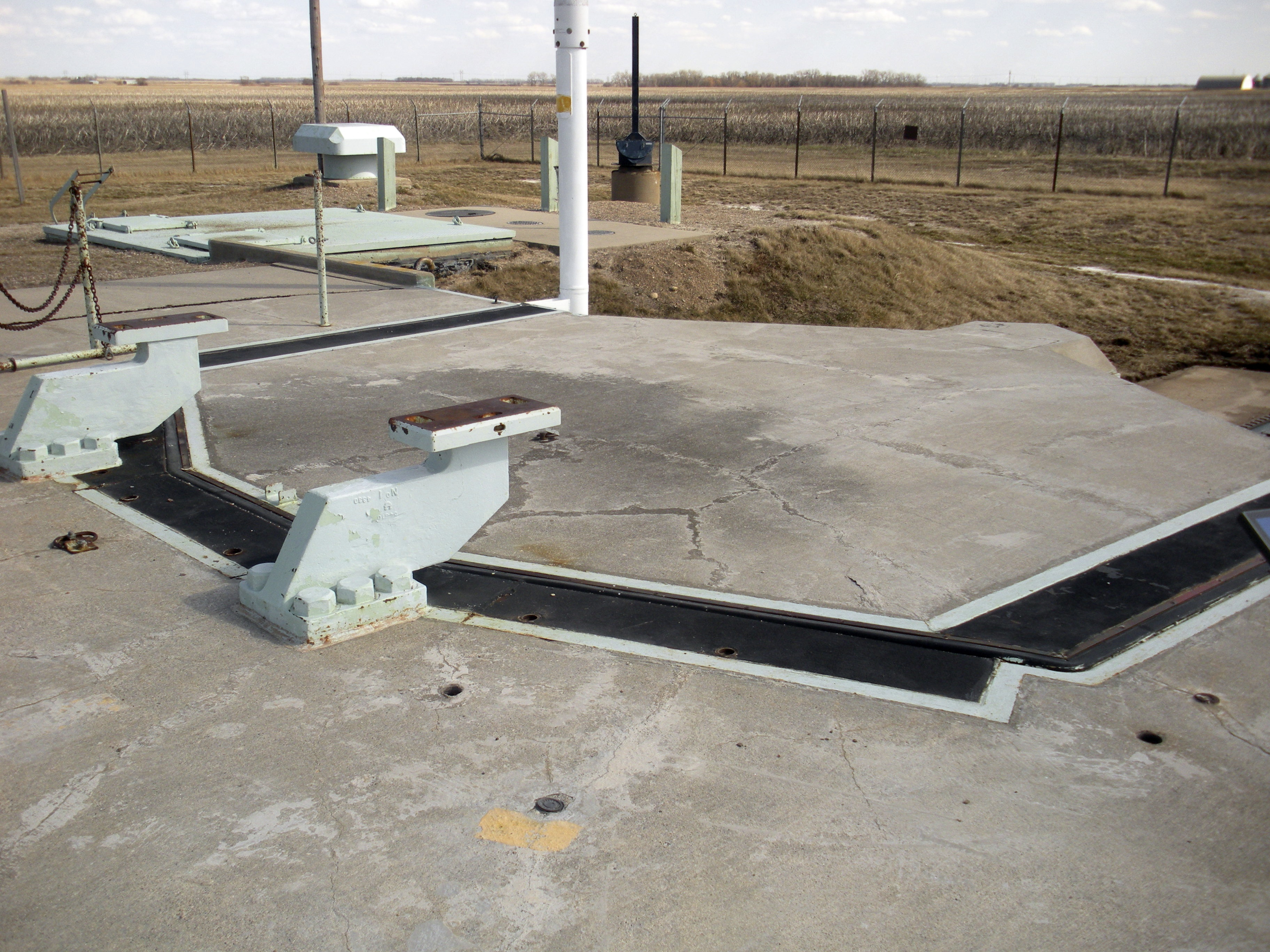
- LGM-30 Minuteman ICBM Silo
- Active: 1952–1971
- Country: United States
- Role: Command of Strategic Strike Forces

Commanders
- Notable commanders: General John Dale Ryan

Insignia
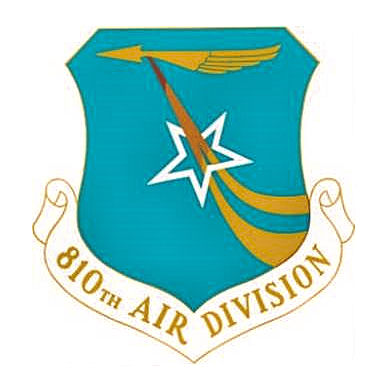
- Emblem of the 810th Strategic Aerospace Division (approved 20 April 1956)

The 810th Strategic Aerospace Division is an inactive United States Air Force organization. Its last assignment was with Strategic Air Command (SAC), assigned to Fifteenth Air Force at Minot Air Force Base, North Dakota, where it was inactivated on 30 June 1971.

The division was first activated in 1952 to manage Biggs Air Force Base, Texas and to command the two SAC bombardment wings stationed there. From 1954 to 1956 it also commanded a reconnaissance squadron that operated from bases in Japan and the United Kingdom. When SAC began to disperse its heavy bomber force in the late 1950s, one of the wings at Biggs moved to Arkansas, and, the other wing moved two of its operational squadrons to bases in Texas and Georgia. The division assumed command of the dispersed strategic wing at Amarillo Air Force Base, Texas, and transferred management of Biggs to the remaining wing there.

In 1962, SAC assumed control of bases in the northern United States from Air Defense Command and the division moved to Minot, where it took command of three strategic wings. Later that year, it added a Minuteman missile wing and was redesignated the 810th Strategic Aerospace Division. It continued to command the wings at Minot, and various wings in the midwestern United States until 1971, when SAC established separate command chains for its bomber and missile wings and inactivated the 810th.

== History ==
=== Biggs Air Force Base ===
The 810th Air Division was activated in 1952 at Biggs Air Force Base, Texas when Strategic Air Command (SAC) departed from the wing base organization system and created air divisions as the headquarters on bases with two operational wings.

The division's components were the 95th and 97th Bombardment Wings, and the newly activated 810th Air Base Group.

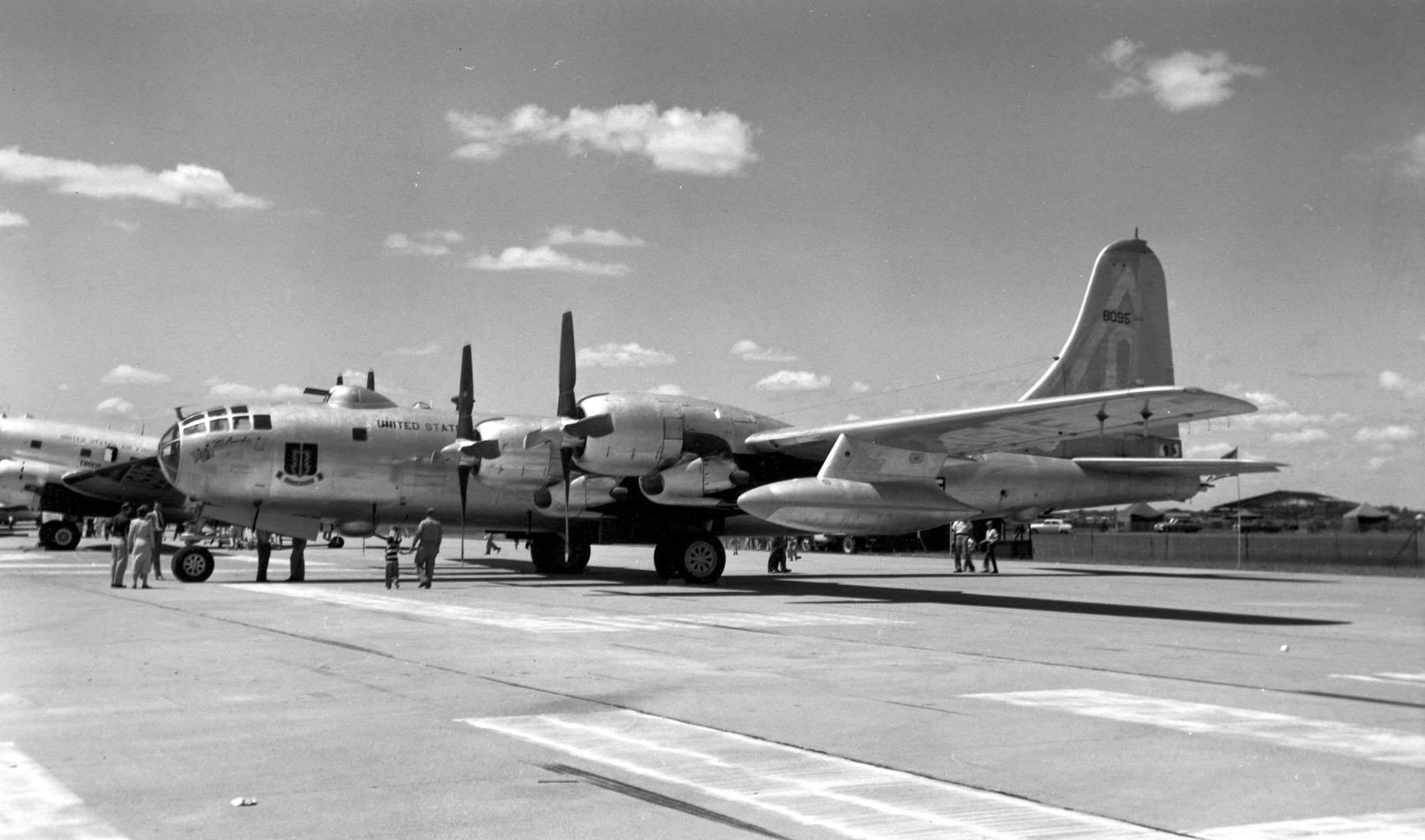
B-50D from the 97th Bomb Wing, Biggs AFB, early 1950s

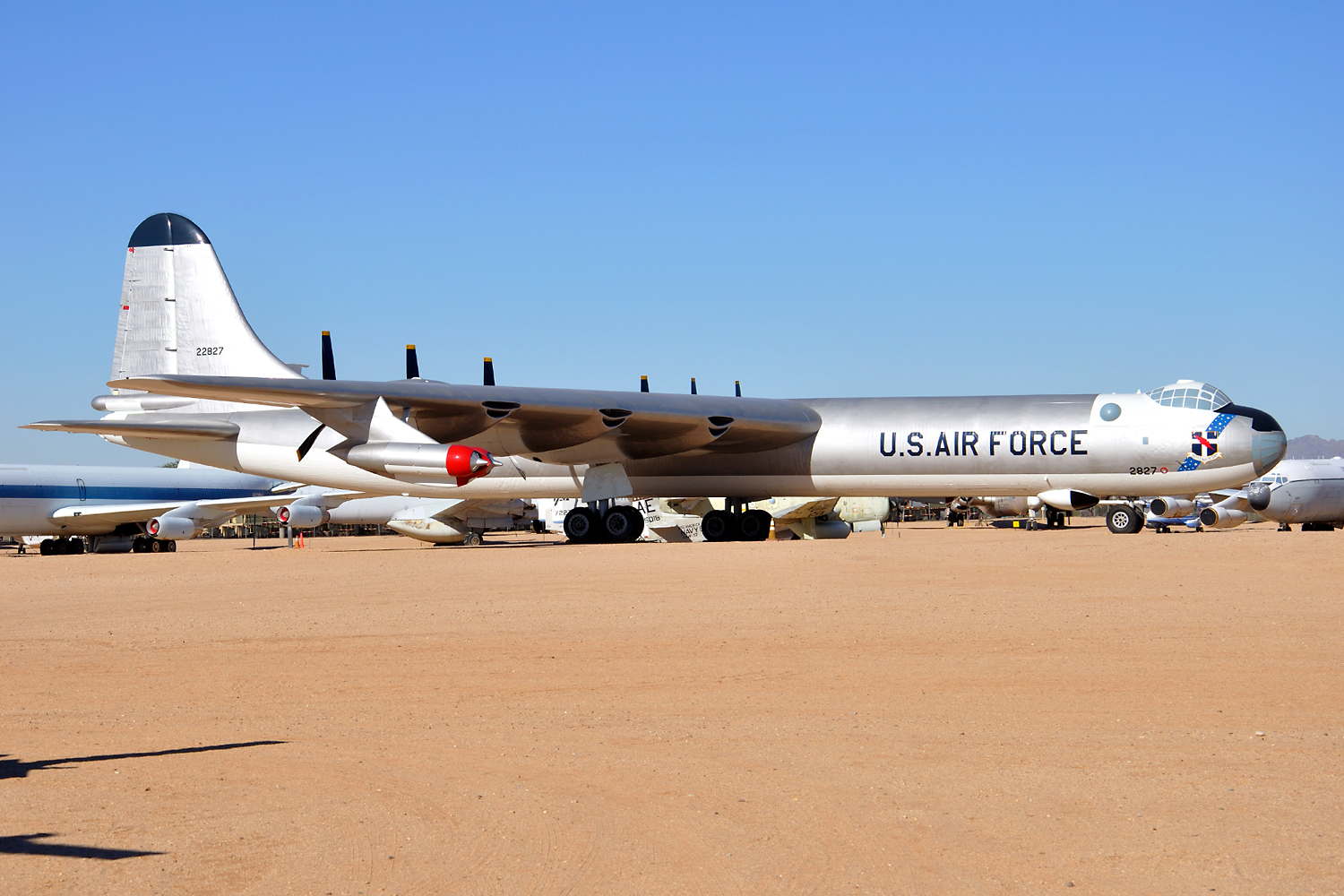
Former 95th Bomb Wing Convair B-36J Peacemaker at the Pima Air Museum

The 97th Bomb Wing's tactical squadrons flew the Boeing B-50 Superfortress and it was also assigned a refueling squadron with Boeing KB-29 Superfortress tankers. The division's 95th Bomb Wing was not manned, but was also nominally a medium bombardment wing.

In July 1953, the 95th wing began to receive personnel, but when it was equipped and began training the following month, it was as a Convair B-36 Peacemaker wing. The division assured the manning, training, and equipping of its two assigned wings to conduct long-range bombardment missions using either nuclear or conventional weapons. Each wing deployed to Andersen Air Force Base, Guam. The 97th wing deployed all its squadrons from December 1952 until March 1953 and again from December 1953 until July 1954. (Note: Wing headquarters remained at Biggs for both these deployments.) The 95th wing deployed from July to November 1955.

The 97th Bomb Wing continued to fly B-50s until 1955, when it converted to the Boeing B-47 Stratojet. Beginning in 1954, the wing's 340th Bombardment Squadron maintained detachments at RAF Lakenheath, England and Yokota Air Base, Japan, flying electronic reconnaissance models of the B-29 and B-50. As the 340th re-equipped with jet bombers, SAC formed the 4024th Bombardment Squadron to operate these planes.

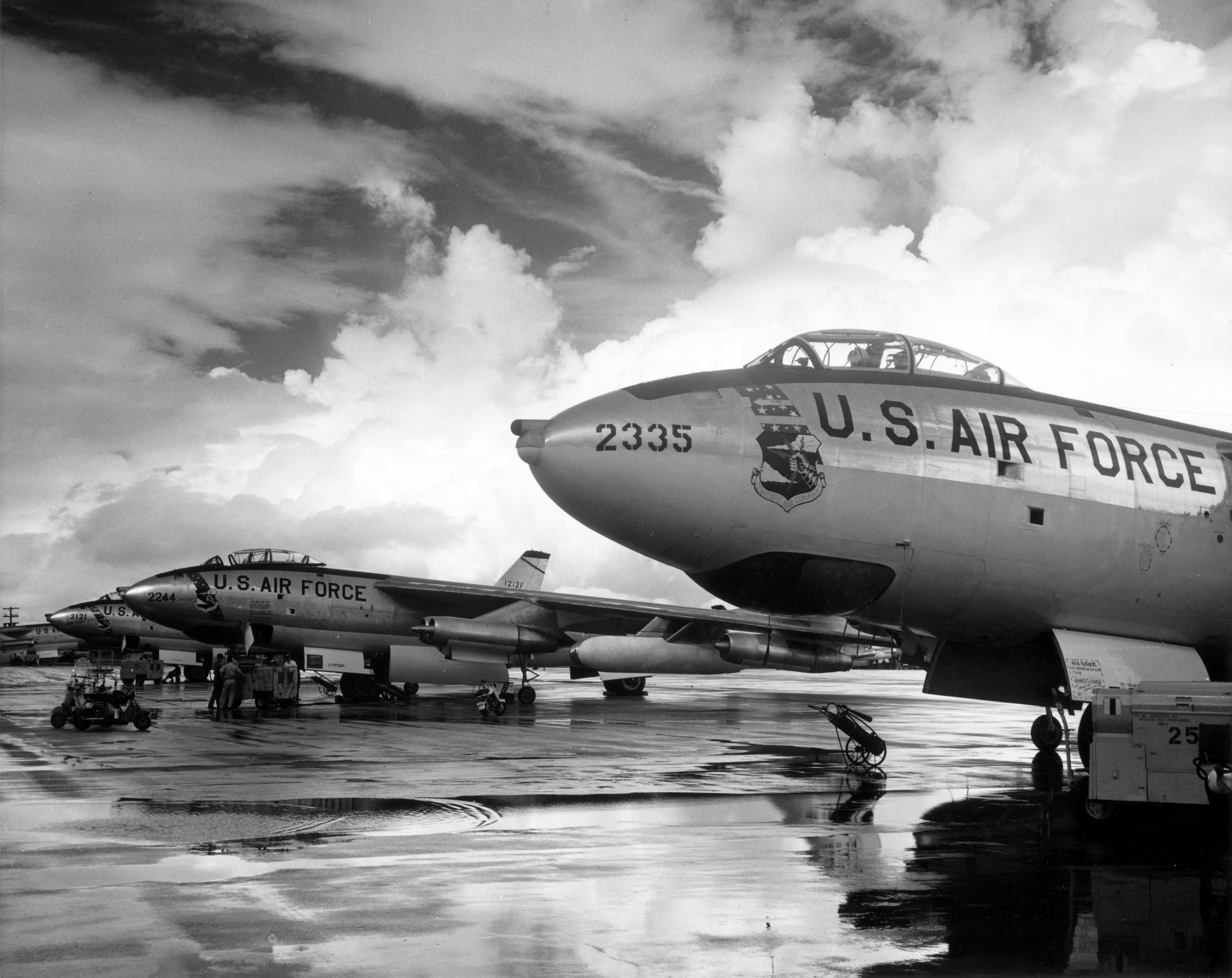
SAC B-47s on the flight line

Although the 4024th was assigned directly to the division, the 97th Bomb Wing continued to exercise operational control of the squadron. The 4024th was inactivated in 1956, but it shared an Air Force Outstanding Unit Award with the 340th squadron for its operations. (Note: The award was also shared with the 343d Strategic Reconnaissance Squadron, which had conducted the operation from 1950 to 1954.) Once the 97th converted to B-47s, it deployed as a unit to RAF Upper Heyford from May to July 1956. Although deployments of its planes and crews continued, that was the only deployment as a complete wing while assigned to the 810th Air Division.

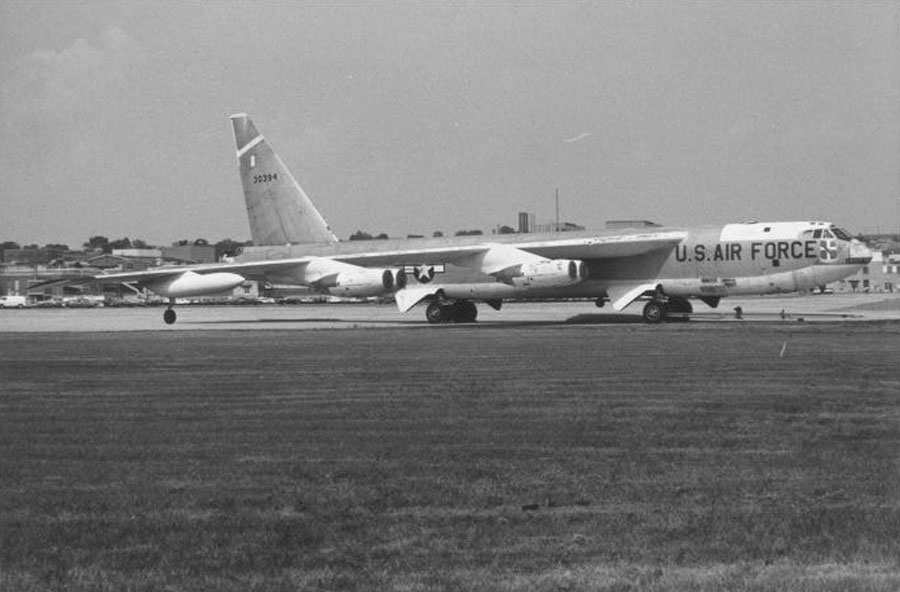
B-52B at Biggs AFB

In 1958, the division began a transformation of its bomber force. The 97th Bomb Wing began to lose its B-47s. In January 1959, it became non-operational. In July the 97th moved to Blytheville Air Force Base, Arkansas, where it re-equipped with Boeing B-52 Stratofortresses and was assigned to another division.

Meanwhile, starting in 1959, the 95th wing replaced its B-36s with B-52s. At the same time, it participated in a SAC plan to disperse its B-52s over a larger number of bases, thus making it more difficult for the Soviet Union to knock out the entire fleet with a surprise first strike. Two of the 95th wing's three bombardment squadrons moved, one to Bergstrom Air Force Base, Texas and the other to Turner Air Force Base, Georgia.

The move of the 97th Bomb Wing left only a single wing, the 95th, at Biggs. The 810th transferred support responsibilities at Biggs to the 95th wing and assumed a new role as an operational headquarters only for B-52 wings at multiple bases in July 1959, when the 4128th Strategic Wing at Amarillo Air Force Base was assigned in place of the 97th. The 4128th was a strategic wing that had been organized when B-52s at Ellsworth Air Force Base were dispersed. Although division aircraft had previously deployed to Guam and England to stand alert, starting in 1960, a portion of division aircraft began to stand alert at their home stations to reduce vulnerability to a Soviet missile strike.

=== Minot Air Force Base ===
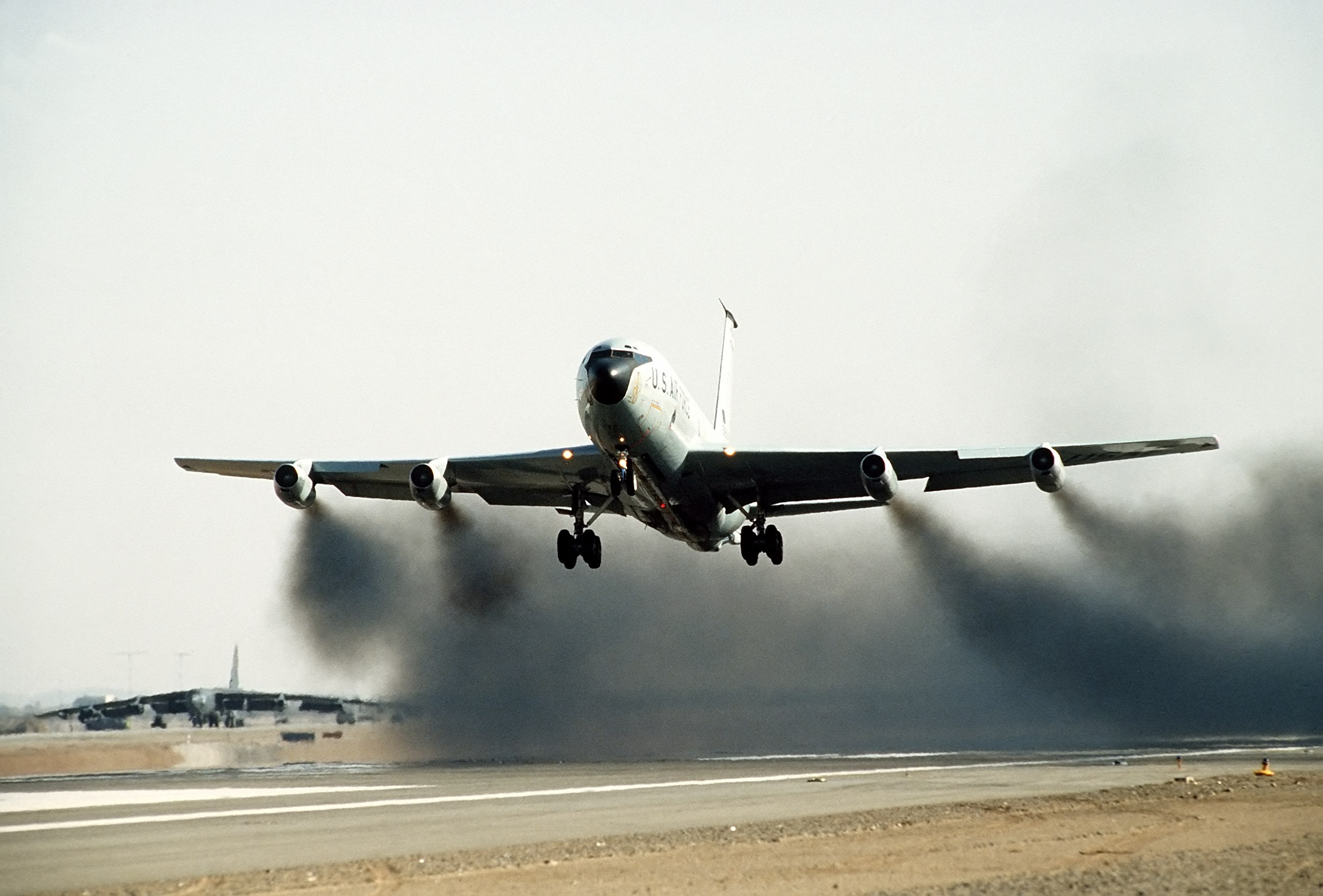
Boeing KC-135A on takeoff using water injection to increase thrust

On 1 July 1962, SAC assumed host responsibility at Minot Air Force Base from Air Defense Command (ADC) and the division moved to Minot from Biggs. On arrival at Minot, it assumed operational control of three dispersed strategic wings equipped with B-52s and Boeing KC-135 Stratotankers at northern tier bases that SAC had taken over from ADC, the 4136th at Minot, the 4141st at Glasgow Air Force Base, Montana and the 4133d at Grand Forks Air Force Base, North Dakota.

Soon after detection of Soviet missiles in Cuba, each of the division's wings was directed to put two additional planes on alert. Two days later, 1/8 of the division's B-52s were placed on airborne alert. Additional KC-135 were placed on alert to replace KC-135s devoted to maintaining the B-52 bomber force on airborne alert. On the 24th, SAC went to DEFCON 2, placing all aircraft on alert. Tanker Task Forces in Spain, Alaska, and the Northeast were increased in size and some division tankers moved and were placed under their operational control. SAC maintained the increased airborne alert until 21 November, when it returned to normal airborne alert posture and assumed DEFCON 3. On 27 November, SAC returned to normal ground alert posture.

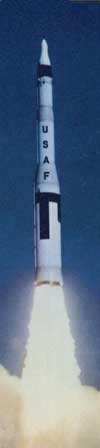
Minuteman I missile launch

In November, in the middle of the Cuban Missile Crisis, a second wing was organized at Minot, the 455th Strategic Missile Wing, equipped with the LGM-30A Minuteman I. In anticipation of the second wing at Minot, the division was assigned the 862d Combat Support Group and host base responsibility for Minot. However, the wing was not operationally ready and did not participate in the SAC response to the crisis. SAC units with responsibility for both aircraft and missiles at this time included the term "aerospace" in their names, and the 810th was redesignated as a Strategic Aerospace Division.

The division's three strategic wings were Major Command controlled (MAJCON) units that could not carry a permanent history or lineage. SAC received authority from Headquarters USAF to discontinue them and activate Air Force controlled (AFCON) units to replace them without altering their missions. On 1 February 1963, the 450th Bombardment Wing replaced the 4136th at Minot, the 91st Bombardment Wing replaced the 4141st at Glasgow and the 319th Bombardment Wing replaced the 4133d at Grand Forks.

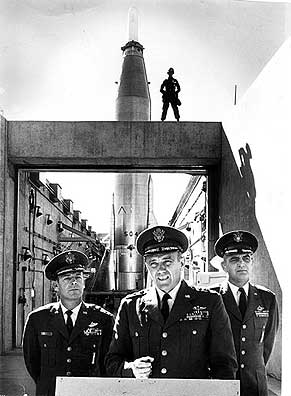
Dedication of 55th Strat Recon Wing Atlas missile site

During the 1960s, various shifts in SAC's division alignment resulted in wings not stationed at Minot being assigned to and reassigned from the wing. The division briefly commanded two wings equipped with SM-65 Atlas missiles between 1964 and 1966. These wings also returned the B-47 to the division's equipment, the 98th Strategic Aerospace Wing in the bomber role, and the 55th Strategic Reconnaissance Wing in reconnaissance and ferret roles.

Between 1966 and 1973, the 810th's subordinate organizations loaned KC-135 Stratotanker and B-52 Stratofortress aircraft and crews, at various times, to Strategic Air command organizations flying Operation Arc Light combat missions in Southeast Asia.

In the spring of 1968, some division aircraft and crews deployed to Okinawa in response to the Pueblo Incident, when the USS Pueblo, a United States Navy vessel, was seized on the high seas by the armed forces of the People's Republic of Korea (North Korea). In the summer of that year, as SAC reduced its B-52 forces as directed by Secretary of Defense Robert S. McNamara, (Note: In December 1965, Secretary McNamara directed the phaseout of the B-52C and several later models by 1971. Knaack, p. 248 n.41.) it inactivated its wings at Glasgow and at Travis Air Force Base, California. SAC decided to preserve the histories of these wings, and did so by moving both to Minot on paper. Travis' 5th Bombardment Wing replaced the 450th wing, while Glasgow's 91st Bombardment Wing became the 91st Strategic Missile Wing and replaced the 455th wing. Neither Minot wing changed its mission nor capability as a result of these moves.

The 810th also periodically participated in tactical exercises. It was inactivated in 1971, when SAC realigned its divisions to provide different headquarters for its missile and bomber forces. The 5th Bombardment Wing was transferred to the 47th Air Division, while the 91st and 341st Strategic Missile Wings were transferred to the 4th Strategic Missile Division.

On 30 November 1972, SAC tested a revival of the use of air divisions on its multi-wing bases, forming the Air Division, Provisional, 810th at Minot and attaching the 5th and 91st wings to it. The test and the provisional division were discontinued on 14 January 1973. Despite the similarity in names and basing, the provisional division is unrelated to the 810th Strategic Aerospace Division.

== Lineage ==
- Constituted as the 810th Air Division on 4 June 1952
- Activated on 16 June 1952

Redesignated 810th Strategic Aerospace Division on 1 November 1962
Inactivated on 30 June 1971

=== Assignments ===
- Eighth Air Force, 16 June 1952
- Fifteenth Air Force, 1 April 1955
- Second Air Force, 1 July 1963
- Fifteenth Air Force, 2 July 1966 – 30 June 1971

=== Stations ===
- Biggs Air Force Base, Texas, 16 June 1952
- Minot Air Force Base, North Dakota, 1 July 1962 – 30 June 1971

=== Components ===
Wings

- 5th Bombardment Wing: 25 July 1968 – 30 June 1971
- 55th Strategic Reconnaissance Wing: 1 September 1964 – 2 July 1966

Forbes Air Force Base, Kansas

- 91st Bombardment Wing (later 91 Strategic Missile Wing): 1 February 1963 – 1 July 1963, 1 July 1966 – 30 June 1971 (attached to Advanced Echelon, 3d Air Division c. 5 February 1968 – 15 April 1968)

Glasgow Air Force Base, Montana

- 95th Bombardment Wing: 16 June 1952 – 1 July 1962 (attached to 3d Air Division 23 July 1955 – 19 November 1955)
- 97th Bombardment Wing: 16 June 1952 – 1 July 1959 (attached to 7th Air Division 5 May 1956 – 4 July 1956)
- 98th Strategic Aerospace Wing: 15 March 1965 – 25 June 1966

Lincoln Air Force Base, Nebraska

- 319th Bombardment Wing: 1 February 1963 – 1 September 1964

Grand Forks Air Force Base, North Dakota

- 341st Strategic Missile Wing: 2 July 1968 – 30 June 1971

Malmstrom Air Force Base, Montana

- 450th Bombardment Wing: 1 February 1963 – 25 July 1968
- 455th Strategic Missile Wing: 1 November 1962 – 25 June 1968
- 4128 Strategic Wing: 1 July 1959 – 1 July 1962 (Note: The 810 SAD Factsheet incorrectly gives the dates for assignment as 1 July 1962 – 1 February 1963. Compare "Factsheet 22 Air Division". Air Force Historical Research Agency. 5 October 2007. Archived from the original on 24 October 2012. (Wing assigned to 22d Air Division on same dates), and see "Abstract, History 4128 Strategic Wing May 1962". Air Force History Index. (22d Air Division to move from Malmstrom and assume command from 810 Air Division in 1962).)

Amarillo Air Force Base, Texas

- 4133 Strategic Wing: 1 July 1962 – 1 February 1963

Grand Forks Air Force Base, North Dakota

- 4136 Strategic Wing: 1 July 1962 – 1 February 1963
- 4141 Strategic Wing: 1 July 1962 – 1 February 1963

Glasgow Air Force Base, Montana

Groups

- 95th Combat Support Group: 1 January 1959 – 1 July 1959
- 810th Air Base Group: 16 June 1952 – 1 January 1959
- 828th Medical Group: 1 January 1959 – 1 July 1959
- 862d Combat Support Group: 1 July 1962 – 30 June 1971
- 862d Medical Group: 1 July 1962 – 2 July 1969 (Note: The Minot hospital was not located on Minot Air Force Base, but just north of the Souris River, across from the city of Minot, North Dakota.)

Squadrons

- 34th Air Refueling Squadron: 1 April 1965 – 1 July 1965
- 4024 Bombardment Squadron: 1 April 1955 – 1 August 1956 (attached to 97th Bombardment Wing)

Other

- USAF Regional Hospital, Minot: 2 July 1969 – 30 June 1971

=== Aircraft and Missiles ===
- Boeing B-50 Superfortress, 1952–1955

RB-50, 1954–1956

- Boeing KB-29 Superfortress, 1952–1956

ERB-29, 1954–1956

- Convair B-36 Peacemaker, 1953–1959
- Boeing KC-97 Stratofreighter, 1954–1957
- Boeing B-47 Stratojet, 1955–1959, 1964–1965

EB-47, 1964–1966
RB-47, 1964–1966

- Boeing B-52 Stratofortress, 1959–1962, 1963–1971
- Boeing KC-135 Stratotanker, 1959–1962, 1963–1971

EC-135, 1966–1969

- Atlas, 1964–1965
- Minuteman I, 1963–1971
- Minuteman II, 1968–1971
- Minuteman III, 1968–1971

=== Commanders ===
Brig Gen John D. Ryan, 16 Jun 1952; Brig Gen John M. Reynolds, by Oct 1953; Col Salvatore E. Manzo, 15 Jul 1958; Brig Gen John B. McPherson, 11 Jul 1962; Col James H. Thompson, 15 Jun 1964; Brig Gen Henry L. Hogan III, 6 Oct 1965; Brig Gen Ralph T. Holland, 29 Jul 1968; Brig Gen Roy N. Casbeer, 4 Aug 1969; Brig Gen Alan C. Edmunds, 3 Sep 1970 – 30 Jun 1971

== See also ==
- List of United States Air Force air divisions
- List of USAF Bomb Wings and Wings assigned to Strategic Air Command
- List of missile wings of the United States Air Force
- List of USAF Strategic Wings assigned to the Strategic Air Command
- List of MAJCOM wings of the United States Air Force
- List of B-29 units of the United States Air Force
- List of B-50 units of the United States Air Force
- List of B-47 units of the United States Air Force
- List of B-52 Units of the United States Air Force
