= 4th Air Division =

- Active: 1940–41, 1942–45, 1946–49, 1951–52, 1952–88
- Country: United States
- Branch: United States Air Force
- Role: Command of strategic strike forces

Commanders
- Notable commanders: James Doolittle; Frederick W. Castle

Insignia
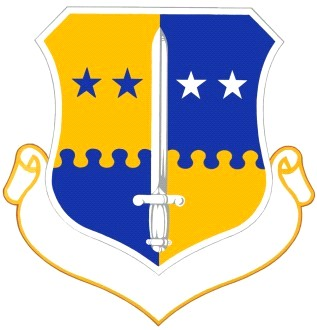
- 4th Air Division emblem (approved 25 June 1974)

The 4th Air Division is an inactive United States Air Force unit. Its last assignment was with Fifteenth Air Force, stationed at Francis E. Warren Air Force Base, Wyoming. It was inactivated on 23 August 1988.

As the 4th Bombardment Wing, the unit was one of the primary B-17 Flying Fortress heavy strategic bombardment wings of VIII Bomber Command (later Eighth Air Force in World War II.

During the Cold War, the 4th Air Division' was an intermediate command echelon of Strategic Air Command, controlling strategic bombardment and intercontinental strategic missile wings until inactivated in 1988.

== History ==
The 4th Bombardment Wing moved to England in June 1943 and as a part of Eighth Air Force began bombing operations against German occupied Europe. Targets included shipyards, synthetic rubber plants, chemical plants, marshalling yards, and oil facilities. In July the wing grew to seven combat groups, which resulted in a reorganization of its groups on 13 September 1943 into the 3d Bombardment Division as a new higher echelon over the 4th and two wings which had groups assigned for the first time: the 13th and 45th Combat Bomb Wings. The 4th CBW administratively controlled only two groups until December 1943, when the newly arrived 447th BG was assigned to it.

In 1944, some subordinate units attacked coastline defenses and marshalling yards in preparation for the Allied invasion of France. Some units supported ground troops during the Battle of the Bulge (December 1944 – January 1945) and the assault across the Rhine (March 1945 – April 1945).

In the postwar years, the command was part of Air Defense Command assigned as a reserve wing assigned to First Air Force from 1946 to 1949.

Rectivated in 1951 as an intermediate command echelon of Strategic Air Command, the 4th Air Division was part of Second Air Force, controlling B-29, Boeing B-50 Superfortress and B-47 wings. In 1962, units controlled by the 4th Air Division supported 2d Air Force's post attack command and control system, and became responsible for the Advanced Airborne Command Post. It participated in the 1962 Cuban Missile Crisis and trained in electronic countermeasures and conducted combat operations in Southeast Asia in the late 1960s.

Reassigned to SAC's Fifteenth Air Force in 1970, the 4th assured that assigned units were capable of conducting strategic aerospace warfare using intercontinental ballistic missiles, long-range bombardment, and air refueling resources, according to the Emergency War Order. In addition, the division assumed airborne command and control responsibilities that consisted of supporting auxiliary airborne command post aircraft.

Inactivated in 1988 as a result of budget reductions and a consolidation of SAC's command and control echelons.

== Lineage ==
- Established as the 4th Bombardment Wing on 19 October 1940

Activated on 18 December 1940
Inactivated on 1 October 1941

- Activated on 7 June 1942

Redesignated 4th Combat Bombardment Wing (Heavy) on 30 August 1943
Redesignated 4th Combat Bombardment Wing, Heavy on 24 August 1944
Disestablished on 18 June 1945

- Reestablished and redesignated 4th Bombardment Wing, Light on 31 December 1946

Activated in the Reserve on 20 December 1946
Redesignated 4th Air Division, Bombardment on 16 April 1948
Inactivated on 27 June 1949

- Redesignated 4th Air Division on 1 February 1951

Organized on 10 February 1951
Discontinued on 16 June 1952

- Activated on 16 June 1952

Redesignated 4th Strategic Aerospace Division on 1 September 1964
Redesignated 4th Strategic Missile Division on 30 June 1971
Redesignated 4th Air Division on 1 March 1973
Inactivated on 23 August 1988

=== Assignments ===
- General Headquarters Air Force, 18 December 1940 – 1 October 1941

Apparently further assigned to Northeast Air District (later, First Air Force) c. 16 January 1941

- VIII Bomber Command, 7 June 1942
- 3d Bombardment Division, 13 September 1943 – 18 June 1945
- First Air Force, 20 December 1946 – 27 June 1949
- Second Air Force, 16 June 1952
- Fifteenth Air Force, 31 March 1970 – 23 August 1988

=== Components ===
Wings

- 2d Bombardment Wing: 1 April 1963 – 1 September 1964
- 28th Bombardment Wing: 15 January 1973 – 1 May 1982
- 44th Strategic Missile Wing: 30 June 1971 – 1 May 1982; 23 January 1987 – 15 July 1988
- 55th Strategic Reconnaissance Wing: 1 October 1976 – 1 April 1980
- 90th Strategic Missile Wing: 30 June 1971 – 23 August 1988
- 91st Strategic Reconnaissance Wing (later 91st Strategic Missile Wing): 10 February – 11 September 1951; 30 June 1971 – 30 November 1972
- 92d Strategic Aerospace Wing: 31 March 1970 – 30 June 1971
- 97th Bombardment Wing: 1 July 1959 – 1 July 1963
- 301st Bombardment Wing (later 301st Air Refueling Wing): 10 February 1951 – 15 April 1958 (detached 3 December 1951 – c. 4 March 1953; c. 10 February-c. 17 April 1954); 5 January – 23 August 1988
- 319th Bombardment Wing: 1 September 1964 – 30 June 1971; 15 January 1973 – 22 January 1975; 1 May 1982 – 23 January 1987
- 321st Strategic Missile Wing: 1 November 1964 – 22 January 1975; 1 May 1982 – 23 January 1987
- 340th Bombardment Wing: 1 September 1963 – 1 September 1964 (detached c. 1–31 August 1964). 321 Strategic Missile: 1 November 1964 – 22 January 1975; 1 May 1982 – 23 January 1987
- 341st Strategic Missile Wing: 30 June 1971 – 15 January 1973; 23 January 1987 – 23 August 1988
- 351st Strategic Missile Wing: 30 June 1971 – 1 July 1973
- 376th Bombardment Wing: 1 June 1951 – 3 December 1957 (detached 1 June – 10 October 1951)
- 401st Provisional Combat Bombardment Wing: 6 June – 14 September 1943
- 410th Bombardment Wing: 1 September 1964 – 31 March 1970
- 454th Bombardment Wing: 1 February – 1 July 1963
- 494th Bombardment Wing: 1 July 1963 – 1 July 1964
- 4130th Strategic Wing: 1 July-l September 1963
- 4228th Strategic Wing: 1 July 1958 – 1 February 1963
- 4238th Strategic Wing: 1 March 1958 – 1 April 1963

Groups

- 34th Bombardment Group: 18 August-c. 1 October 1941
- 43d Bombardment Group: August-5 September 1941
- 94th Bombardment Group: 13 June 1943 – 6 January 1945
- 95th Bombardment Group: July-13 September 1943
- 96th Bombardment Group: c. May-c. September 1943
- 100th Bombardment Group: 6 June 1943 – 1 January 1944
- 319th Bombardment Group: 17 October 1947 – 27 June 1949
- 320th Bombardment Group: 17 October 1947 – 27 June 1949
- 385th Bombardment Group: c. June 1943-c. August 1945
- 388th Bombardment Group: c. July 1943-c. August 1945
- 390th Bombardment Group: c. July-13 September 1943
- 447th Bombardment Group: c. November 1943-c. June 1945
- 486th Bombardment Group: c. January-c. June 1945
- 487th Bombardment Group: c. January-c. August 1945

Squadron

- 376th Air Refueling Squadron: 1 June 1951 – 20 May 1952; 1 December 1957 – 15 April 1958

=== Stations ===
- Mitchel Field, New York, 18 December 1940
- Westover Field, Massachusetts, 20 March – 1 October 1941; 7 June 1942
- Bolling Field, District of Columbia, c. 28 July c. 28 August 1942
- RAF High Wycombe (Camp Lynn) (AAF-101), England, 12 September 1942
- Marks Hall (AAF-160), England, 18 January 1943
- Camp Blainey, England, June 1943
- RAF Bury St Edmunds (AAF-468), England, 13 September 1943 – 18 June 1945
- Mitchel Field, New York, 20 December 1946 – 27 June 1949
- Barksdale Air Force Base, Louisiana, 10 February 1951 16 June 1952; 16 June 1952 – 1 September 1964
- Grand Forks Air Force Base, North Dakota, 1 September 1964
- Francis E. Warren Air Force Base, Wyoming, 30 June 1971 – 23 August 1988

=== Aircraft and missiles ===
- A-29 Hudson 1941
- B-17 Flying Fortress 1941
- B-18 Bolo 1941
- LB-30 1941
- B-17 Flying Fortress 1943–1945
- B/RB-45 Tornado 1951
- RB-50 Superfortress 1951
- B-29 Superfortress 1951 – 1952, 1952–1954
- KB-29 Superfortress 1951 – 1952, 1952–1953
- B-47 Stratojet 1953 – 1958
- KC-97 Stratofreighter 1953 – 1958
- B/E/EB-47 Stratojet 1954 – 1957
- RB-47 Stratojet 1958
- B-52 Stratofortress 1959 – 1988
- KC-135 Stratotanker 1959 – 1988
- LGM-30A Minuteman I 1963 – 1974
- LGM-30F Minuteman II 1965 – 1988
- LGM 30G Minuteman III 1971 – 1972 1973 – 1988
- C-135 Stratolifter 1977 – 1980
- E-4 Nightwatch 1977 – 1980
- EC-135 Looking Glass 1977 – 1982
- RC-135 Rivet Joint 1977 – 1980
- LGM-118A Peacekeeper 1986 – 1988

== See also ==
- List of United States Air Force air divisions
