= Chengdu airport =

Chengdu airport may refer to the following airports in Chengdu, Sichuan, China:

- Chengdu Shuangliu International Airport ("Chengdu Airport"), the primary airport serving the City of Chengdu since 1938
- Chengdu Tianfu International Airport ("Tianfu Airport"), a suburban airport opened in 2021 serving the City of Chengdu
- Chengdu Fenghuangshan Airport, a military airport in suburban Chengdu since 1944
- Xinjin Airport, a general aviation airport in suburban Chengdu since 1928
