= Second Air Force =

Numbered air force of the United States Air Force responsible for non-flying training

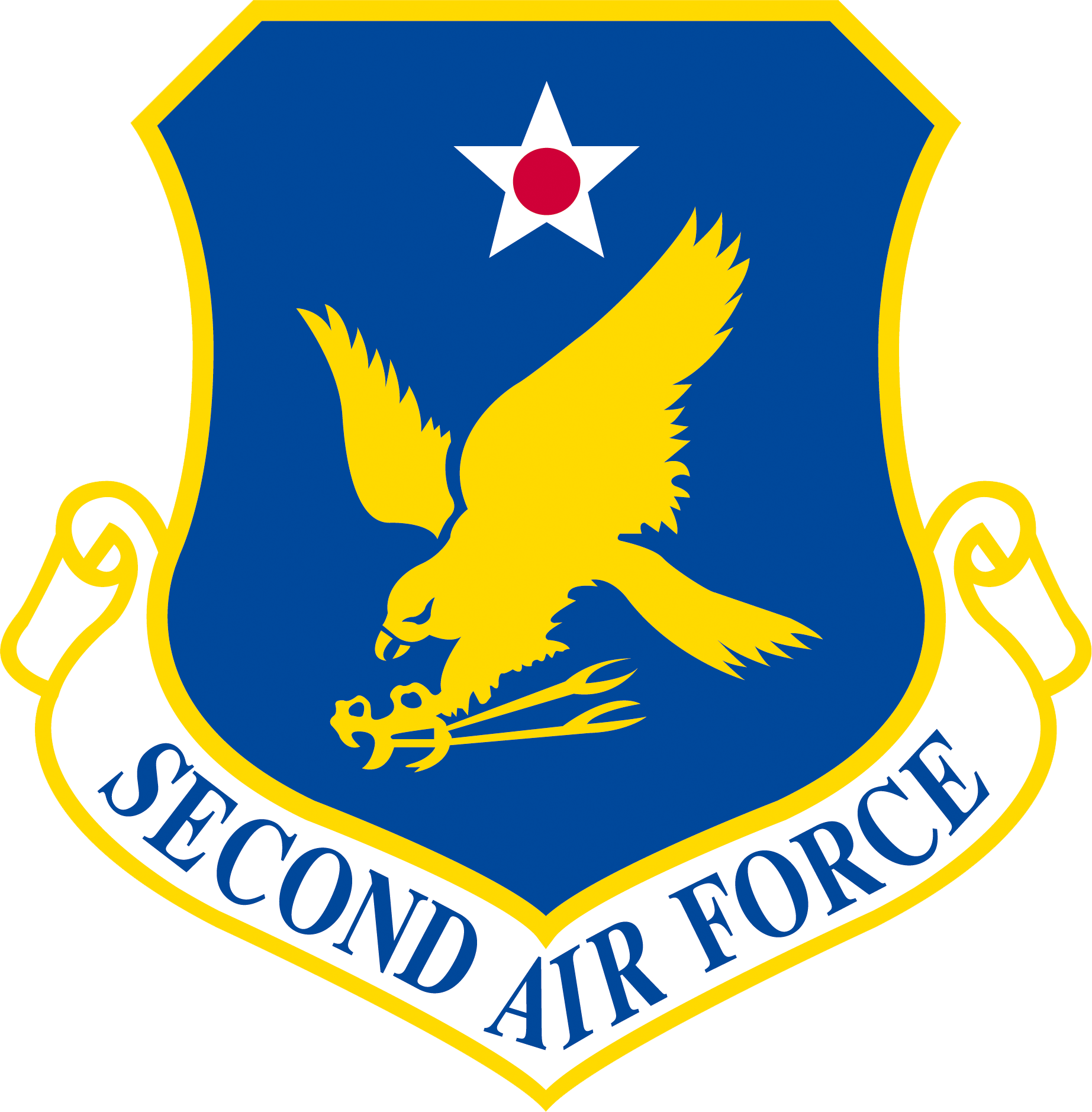
- Shield of the Second Air Force
- Active: 1 July 1993 – present 1 September 1991- 1 July 1993; 1 November 1949 – 1 January 1975; 6 June 1946 – 1 July 1948; 18 September 1942 – 30 March 1946 (as Second Air Force); 26 March 1941 – 18 September 1942 (as 2 Air Force); 19 October 1940 – 26 March 1941 (as Northwest Air District) (85 years, 10 months)
- Country: United States of America
- Branch: United States Air Force (18 September 1947 – present); United States Army ( Army Air Forces, 20 June 1941 – 18 September 1947; Army Air Corps 19 October 1940 – 20 June 1941)
- Type: Numbered Air Force
- Role: To provide basic military training and technical training for enlisted Airmen and non-flying officers
- Size: 13,900 Airmen
- Part of: Air Education and Training Command
- Headquarters: Keesler Air Force Base, Mississippi, U.S.
- Mottos: "Second to None…Train, Develop, Inspire!"
- Engagements: World War II – American Theater

- Decorations: Air Force Outstanding Unit Award
- Website: www.2af.aetc.af.mil

Commanders
- Commander: Maj Gen Matthew Wolfe Davidson
- Vice Commander: Col Nicholas Dipoma
- Command Chief: CMSgt Kristina B. Montgomery

The Second Air Force (2 AF; 2d Air Force in 1942) is a USAF numbered air force responsible for conducting basic military and technical training for Air Force enlisted members and non-flying officers. In World War II the CONUS unit defended the Northwestern United States and Upper Great Plains regions and during the Cold War, was Strategic Air Command unit with strategic bombers and missiles. Elements of Second Air Force engaged in combat operations during the Korean War; Vietnam War, as well as Operation Desert Storm.

== History ==
The Northwest Air District of the GHQ Air Force was established on 19 October 1940; activated on 18 December 1940 at McChord Field, and then re-designated, amidst some internal confusion, as 2d Air Force on 26 March 1941. 5th Bombardment Wing was assigned to Second Air Force up until 5 September 1941.

=== 2nd Air Force ===
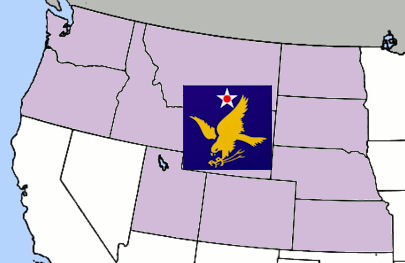
Second Air Force region of the United States, World War II

On 11 December 1941, four days after the Pearl Harbor attack, 2d Air Force was placed under Western Defense Command. However, on 5 January 1942, it was returned to the Air Force Combat Command (a redesignation of GHQAF after creation of the United States Army Air Forces on 20 January 1941), and later placed directly under Headquarters AAF when Air Force Combat Command was dissolved in March 1942.

From December 1941, 2d Air Force organized air defense for the northwest Pacific Ocean coastline of the United States (1940–1941) and flew antisubmarine patrols along coastal areas until October 1942. It appears that immediately after 7 December 1941, only the 7th, 17th, 39th and 42d Bombardment Groups under II Bomber Command were available for this duty. In late January 1942, elements of the B-25 Mitchell-equipped 17th Bombardment Group at Pendleton Field, Oregon were reassigned to Columbia Army Air Base, South Carolina ostensibly to fly antisubmarine patrols off the southeast coast of the United States, but in actuality came to prepare for the Doolittle Raid against Japan.

In January 1942, the 2d Air Force was withdrawn from the Western Defense Command and assigned the operational training of units, crews, and replacements for bombardment, fighter, and reconnaissance operations. It received graduates from Army Air Forces Training Command flight schools; navigator training; flexible gunnery schools and various technical schools, organized them into newly activated combat groups and squadrons, and conducted operational unit training (OTU) and replacement training (RTU) to prepare groups and replacements for deployment overseas to combat theaters.

As the Second Air Force it became predominantly the training organization of B-17 Flying Fortress and B-24 Liberator heavy bombardment groups. Nearly all new heavy bomb groups organized after Pearl Harbor were organized and trained by Second Air Force OTU units, then were deployed to combat commands around the world. After most of the heavy bombardment groups had completed OTU training, the Second Air Force conducted replacement training of heavy bombardment combat crews and acquired a new mission of operational and replacement training of very heavy bombardment (B-29 Superfortress) groups and crews.

Designated the Second Air Force on 18 September 1942, starting in mid-1943 the unit's training of B-17 and B-24 replacement crews began to be phased out, and reassigned to First, Third and Fourth Air Forces as the command began ramping up training of B-29 Superfortress Very Heavy bomb groups, destined for Twentieth Air Force. Under the newly organized XX Bomber Command, B-29 aircraft were received from Boeing's manufacturing plants and new combat groups were organized and trained. XX Bomber Command and the first B-29 groups were deployed in December 1943 to airfields in India for Operation Matterhorn operations against Japan.

A football team made up of Second Air Force personnel defeated Hardin–Simmons University in the 1943 Sun Bowl.

XXI Bomber Command, the second B-29 combat command and control organization was formed under Second Air Force in March 1944 with its combat groups beginning to deploy to the Mariana Islands in the Western Pacific beginning in December 1944. A third B-29 organization, XXII Bomber Command was formed by Second Air Force in August 1944, however the organization never got beyond forming Headquarters echelon and Headquarters squadron. Inactivated before any operational groups were assigned, as XX Bomber Command units were reassigned from India to the Marianas, eliminating need for the command.

On 13 December 1944, First, Second, Third and Fourth Air Force were all placed under the unified command of the Continental Air Forces (CAF) with the Numbered Air Forces becoming subordinate commands of CAF. The training of B-29 groups and replacement personnel continued until August 1945 and the end of the Pacific War. With the war's end, Second Air Force was inactivated on 30 March 1946. In what was effectively a redesignation, the headquarters staff and resources were used to create Fifteenth Air Force, which became the first Numbered Air Force of the new Strategic Air Command ten days later.

=== Cold War ===
The command was reactivated on 6 June 1946 under Air Defense Command, at Offutt Air Force Base. The Second Air Force assumed responsibility for the air defense of certain portions of the continental United States. In 1947, the 73d Bomb Wing was reactivated with the 338th and 351st Bombardment Groups being assigned to it, both reserve B-29 Superfortress organizations. The wing was assigned to Second Air Force. A third group, the 381st was added in 1948. However SAC was having enough difficulties keeping its front-line active duty bomb units in the air to maintain even minimal pilot proficiency in the late 1940s. The wing and its bomb groups were all inactivated in 1949.

The Second Air Force was also assigned the reserve 96th Bombardment Wing, which was later redesignated an air division, and several C-46 Commando troop carrier groups under the 322d Troop Carrier Wing. One of these groups was the 440th Troop Carrier Group. It was again inactivated on 1 July 1948.

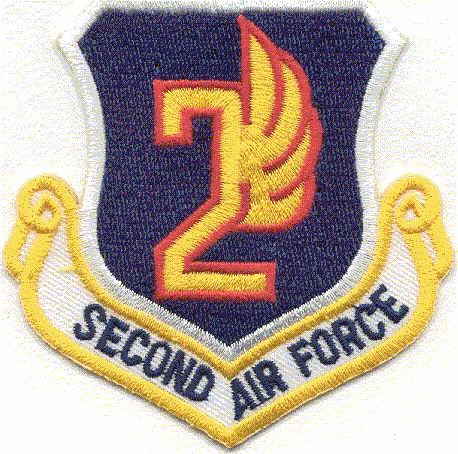

The Second Air Force was (re)-activated and assigned to Strategic Air Command on 1 November 1949 at Barksdale AFB, Louisiana. It drew personnel and equipment from the 311th Air Division, inactivated on the same base on the same day. Initial units of the Second Air Force as part of SAC included:

- 6th Air Division, MacDill AFB, Florida (assigned 10 February 1951)

305th Bombardment Wing (MacDill AFB) (B-29)
306th Bombardment Wing (MacDill AFB) (B-47A)(Initial B-47 Stratojet Operational Training Unit – Not on Operational Alert)
307th Bombardment Wing (MacDill AFB) (B-29)

Detached for Korean War combat service with Far East Air Force, Kadena AB, Okinawa

- 40th Air Division, Turner AFB, Georgia (assigned 14 March 1951)

31st Fighter Escort Wing (Turner AFB) (F-84)
108th Fighter Wing (Turner AFB) (F-47D) (Federalized New Jersey Air National Guard wing)

37th and 38th Air Divisions joined Second Air Force on 10 October 1951. 37th Air Division was responsible for Lockbourne Air Force Base and Lake Charles Air Force Base, and 38th Air Division was located at Hunter Air Force Base, Georgia.

With the end of fighting in Korea, President Eisenhower's administration chose to invest in the Air Force, especially Strategic Air Command. The nuclear arms race shifted into high gear. The Air Force retired nearly all of its propeller-driven bombers and they were replaced by new Boeing B-47 Stratojet medium jet bombers. In 1955, the Boeing B-52 Stratofortress heavy bomber began entering the inventory in substantial numbers and as a result, Second Air Force grew both in scope and in numbers.

After the Korean War, the history of Second Air Force became part of Strategic Air Command's history, as B-47 Stratojet, and later B-52 Stratofortress and KC-135 Stratotanker aircraft entered SAC's inventory. During the Cold War, Second Air Force aircraft and intercontinental ballistic missiles (ICBM)s stood nuclear alert, providing a deterrence against an attack on the United States by the Soviet Union. In 1966, an order of battle for the force showed units spread across most of the United States, from the 6th Strategic Aerospace Wing at Walker AFB, New Mexico, to the 11th Strategic Aerospace Wing at Altus AFB, Oklahoma, to the 97th Bombardment Wing at Blytheville AFB, Arkansas.

During the Vietnam War, squadrons of Second Air Force B-52 Stratofortesses (primarily B-52Ds, augmented by some B-52Gs) were deployed to bases on Guam, Okinawa and Thailand to conduct Arc Light bombing attacks on communist forces. The 28th Bombardment Wing was among the units assigned this duty. The 2d Air Force organization was inactivated during the post-Vietnam drawdown, on 1 January 1975, with those 2 AF bomb wings not inactivated and/or those 2 AF bases not closed, redistributed to 8 AF and 15 AF.

With the end of the Cold War and the restructuring of Strategic Air Command, Second Air Force was reactivated and became the steward for reconnaissance and battlefield management assets, based at Beale AFB, California. This assignment lasted from 1 September 1991 until 1 July 1993, when it was inactivated by Air Combat Command.

=== Air Education and Training Command ===
Second Air Force was reactivated and reassigned on 1 July 1993 to Keesler AFB, Mississippi. Its mission became conducting basic military and technical training for Air Force enlisted members and support officers at five major AETC training bases in the United States.

The command has the mission is to train mission ready graduates to support combat readiness and to build 'the world's most respected air, space, and cyberspace force'. To carry out this mission, Second Air Force manages all operational aspects of nearly 5,000 active training courses taught to approximately 250,000 students annually in technical training, basic military training, medical and distance learning courses. Training operations across Second Air Force range from intelligence to computer operations to space and missile operations and maintenance.

The first stop for all Air Force, Air National Guard and Air Force Reserve enlisted airmen is basic military training (BMT) at Lackland AFB, Texas. After completing BMT, airmen begin technical training in their career field specialties, primarily at five installations: Goodfellow, Lackland, and Sheppard Air Force bases in Texas; Keesler AFB, Mississippi; and Vandenberg AFB, California. Each base is responsible for a specific portion of formal technical training airmen require to accomplish the Air Force mission. Instructors conduct technical training in specialties such as enlisted aviator, aircraft maintenance, civil engineering, medical services, computer systems, security forces, air traffic control, personnel, intelligence, fire fighting, and space and missile operations.

Commissioned officers attend technical training courses for similar career fields at the same locations.

Wings and Groups under Second Air Force are:

- 37th Training Wing Lackland Air Force Base Texas
  Provides Basic Military Training to Air Force recruits as well as technical training in the career enlisted aviator, logistics, and Security Forces career fields.
- 81st Training Wing Keesler Air Force Base Mississippi
  Provides training in Aviation Resource Management, weather, basic electronics, communications electronic systems, communications computer systems, air traffic control, airfield management, command post, air weapons control, precision measurement, education and training, financial management and comptroller, information management, manpower and personnel.
- 17th Training Wing Goodfellow Air Force Base Texas
  Provides training in intelligence and firefighting career fields. Also provides training to Army, Navy and Marine detachments.
- 82d Training Wing Sheppard Air Force Base Texas
  Provides specialized technical training, medical, and field training for officers, Airmen, and civilians of all branches of the military, other DoD agencies, and foreign nationals.
- 381st Training Group Vandenberg AFB, California
  Provides qualification training for intercontinental ballistic missiles (ICBM), space surveillance, missile warning, spacelift, and satellite command and control operators. It also performs initial and advanced maintenance training on air-launched missiles (ALM) and ICBMs. It conducts training in joint space fundamentals and associated computer maintenance. The group also conducts qualification and orientation training for Air Force Space Command (AFSPC) staff and senior-level personnel, as well as instructor enhancement in support of operational units.
- 602d Training Group Keesler Air Force Base Mississippi
  Provides fully combat mission capable Airmen to all Combatant Commanders in direct support of the Joint Expeditionary Tasking (JET) mission.

In 2006, Second Air Force was assigned the responsibility of coordinating training for Joint Expeditionary Tasked (JET) Training Airmen. These Airmen are assigned to perform traditional US Army duties in Iraq, Afghanistan and the Horn of Africa. An Expeditionary Mission Support Group was formed to provide command and control of these JET Airmen as they are trained at US Army Power Projection Platforms across the US prior to deploying to their assigned Area of Responsibility (AOR). This group has been named the 602d Training Group.

In 2007, Second Air Force was given responsibility to provide curricula and advice to the Iraqi Air Force as it stands up its own technical training and branch specific basic training among others. This mission is known as "CAFTT" for Coalition Air Forces Technical Training.

== Lineage ==
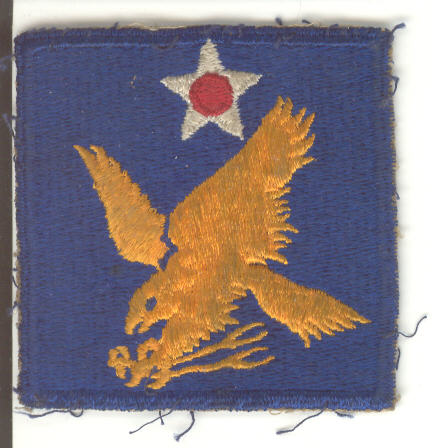
Patch of Second Air Force during World War II

- Established as Northwest Air District on 19 October 1940

Activated on 18 December 1940
Re-designated: 2d Air Force on 26 March 1941
Re-designated: Second Air Force on 18 September 1942
Inactivated on 30 March 1946.

- Activated on 6 June 1946.

Inactivated on 1 July 1948.

- Activated on 1 November 1949.

Inactivated on 1 January 1975.

- Activated on 1 September 1991.

Inactivated on 1 July 1993.

- Activated on 1 July 1993

=== Assignments ===
- General Headquarters Air Force

(later, Air Force Combat Command) 18 December 1940

- Western Defense Command, 11 December 1941
- Air Force Combat Command

(later, United States Army Air Forces), 5 January 1942

- Continental Air Forces 13 December 1944

Strategic Air Command 21 March 1946 – 30 March 1946

- Air Defense Command, 6 June 1946 – 1 July 1948
- Strategic Air Command, 1 November 1949 – 1 January 1975; 1 September 1991 – July 1993
- Air Combat Command, 1 June 1992 – 1 July 1993
- Air Education and Training Command, 1 July 1993

=== Stations ===
- McChord Field, Washington, 18 December 1940
- Fort George Wright, Washington, 9 January 1941
- Colorado Springs AAF, Colorado, 13 June 1943 – 30 March 1946
- Fort Crook, Nebraska, 6 June 1946 – 1 July 1948
- Barksdale AFB, Louisiana, 1 November 1949 – 1 January 1975
- Beale AFB, California, 1 September 1991 – 1 July 1993
- Keesler AFB, Mississippi. 1 July 1993 –

=== Components ===
==== Commands ====
- I Bomber Command: 1 May – 6 October 1943

Redesignated: XX Bomber Command: 20 November 1943 – 29 June 1944

- 2d Air Force Service (later, 2d Air Force Base) Command: 1 October 1941 – 20 May 1942.
- 2d Air Support (later, 2d Ground Air Support; II Air Support) Command: 1 September 1941 – 25 January 1943
- 2d Bomber (later, II Bomber) Command: 5 September 1941 – 6 October 1943.
- 4th Air Support (later, IV Air Support) Command: 12 August 1942 – 21 January 1943.
- XXI Bomber Command: 1 March 1944 – 9 November 1944
- XXII Bomber Command: 14 August 1944 – 13 February 1945

==== Divisions ====
- 4th Air (later, 4th Strategic Aerospace): 16 June 1952 – 31 March 1970
- 6th Air: 10 February 1951 – 16 June 1952; 16 June 1952 – 1 January 1959.
- 17th Air (later, 17th Strategic Aerospace): 15 July 1959 – 1 July 1963
- 19th Air: 1 July 1955 – 1 January 1975.
- 21st Air (later, 21st Strategic Aerospace): 1 January 1959 – 1 September 1964
- 22d Air: 15 July 1959 – 9 September 1960. 37 Air: 10 October 1951 – 28 May 1952
- 37th Air: 10 October 1951 – 28 May 1952
- 38th Air: 10 October 1951 – 16 June 1952; 16 June 1952 – 1 January 1959
- 40th Air

14 March 1951 – 1 July 1952
1 July 1952 – 1 April 1957
1 July 1959 – 1 January 1975

- 42d Air (later, 42d Strategic Aerospace; 42d Air)

1 April 1955 – 1 July 1957
15 July 1959 – 2 July 1969
1 January 1970 – 1 January 1975

- 45th Air: 31 March 1970 – 1 January 1975
- 47th Air: 31 March 1970 – 1 July 1971
- 73d Air (formerly, 73d Bombardment Wing): 12 June 1947 – 1 July 1948
- 96th Air (formerly, 96th Bombardment Wing): 12 June 1947 – 1 July 1948
- 322d Air (formerly, 322d Troop Carrier Wing): 12 June 1947 – 1 July 1948
- 801st Air: 28 May 1952 – 1 July 1955. 806 Air: 16 June 1952 – 15 June 1960
- 806th Air: 16 June 1952 – 15 June 1960
- 810th Strategic Aerospace: 1 July 1963 – 2 July 1966
- 813th Air: 15 July 1954 – 1 June 1956
- 816th Air (later, 816th Strategic Aerospace): 1 July 1958 – 1 July 1965
- 817th Air: 31 March 1970 – 30 June 1971
- 818th Air (later, 818th Strategic Aerospace): 1 January 1959 – 25 March 1965
- 819th Strategic Aerospace: 1 July 1965 – 2 July 1966
- 823d Air: 1 June 1956 – 1 January 1959; 31 March 1970 – 30 June 1971
- 825th Air (later, 825th Strategic Aerospace): 1 August 1955 – 1 January 1970.

==== Wings ====
- 5th Bombardment Wing: 18 December 1940 – 1 September 1941.
- 11th Pursuit Wing: 18 December 1940 – 1 October 1941.
- 15th Bombardment Training Wing: 23 June 1942 – 6 April 1946 (ceased all activity February 1945).
- 20th Bombardment Wing: 18 December 1940 – 1 September 1941.

==== Squadrons ====
- 393rd Bombardment Squadron, Very Heavy: 25 November - 17 December 1944

== List of commanders ==
No.	Commander		Term		
No.	Portrait	Name	Took office	Left office	Term length
1	John C. Griffith	Major General; John C. Griffith	1 July 1993	13 June 1995	1 year, 347 days
2	Henry M. Hobgood	Major General; Henry M. Hobgood	13 June 1995	28 August 1996	1 year, 76 days
3	Lance W. Lord	Major General; Lance W. Lord	28 August 1996	1 August 1997	338 days
4	Andrew J. Pelak Jr.	Major General; Andrew J. Pelak Jr.	1 August 1997	25 August 2000	3 years, 24 days
5	John F. Regni	Major General; John F. Regni	25 August 2000	8 July 2004	3 years, 318 days
6	Lloyd S. Utterback	Major General; Lloyd S. Utterback	8 July 2004	9 November 2005	1 year, 124 days
7	Michael C. Gould	Major General; Michael C. Gould	9 November 2005	23 May 2008	2 years, 196 days
8	Alfred K. Flowers	Major General; Alfred K. Flowers	23 May 2008	29 September 2009	1 year, 129 days
9	Mary Kay Hertog	Major General; Mary Kay Hertog	29 September 2009	21 July 2011	1 year, 295 days
10	Leonard A. Patrick	Major General; Leonard A. Patrick	21 July 2011	3 July 2014	2 years, 347 days
11	Mark Anthony Brown	Major General; Mark Anthony Brown	3 July 2014	26 August 2016	2 years, 54 days
12	Robert D. LaBrutta	Major General; Robert D. LaBrutta	26 August 2016	23 August 2017	362 days
13	Timothy J. Leahy	Major General; Timothy J. Leahy	23 August 2017	29 August 2019	2 years, 6 days
14	Andrea Tullos	Major General; Andrea Tullos	29 August 2019	30 July 2021	1 year, 335 days
15	Michele C. Edmondson	Major General; Michele C. Edmondson	30 July 2021	2 August 2024	3 years, 3 days
16	Matthew Wolfe Davidson	Major General; Matthew Wolfe Davidson	2 August 2024	Incumbent	2 years, 43 days
