= 426th Tactical Fighter Training Squadron =

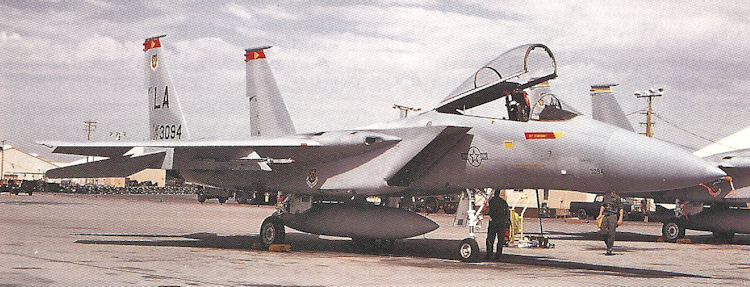
- 426th Tactical Fighter Training Squadron F-15A-8-MC Eagle 73-0094, 1984
- Active: 1943–1945; 1970–1990
- Country: United States
- Branch: United States Air Force
- Type: Squadron
- Role: Interceptor training
- Engagements: China-Burma-India Theater: World War II Asiatic-Pacific Theatre

Insignia
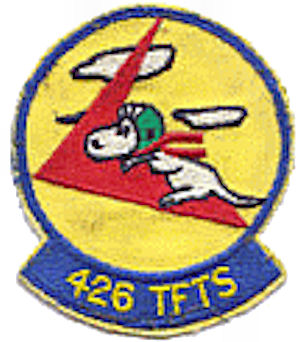
- 426th Tactical Fighter Training Squadron emblem

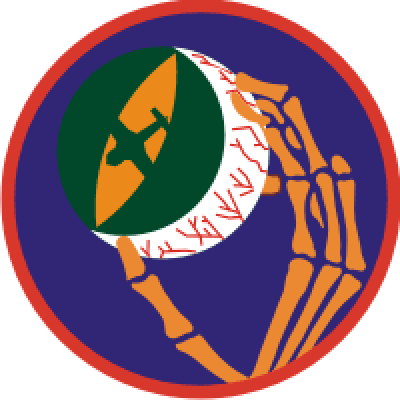
- 426th Night Fighter Squadron emblem (approved 8 June 1944)

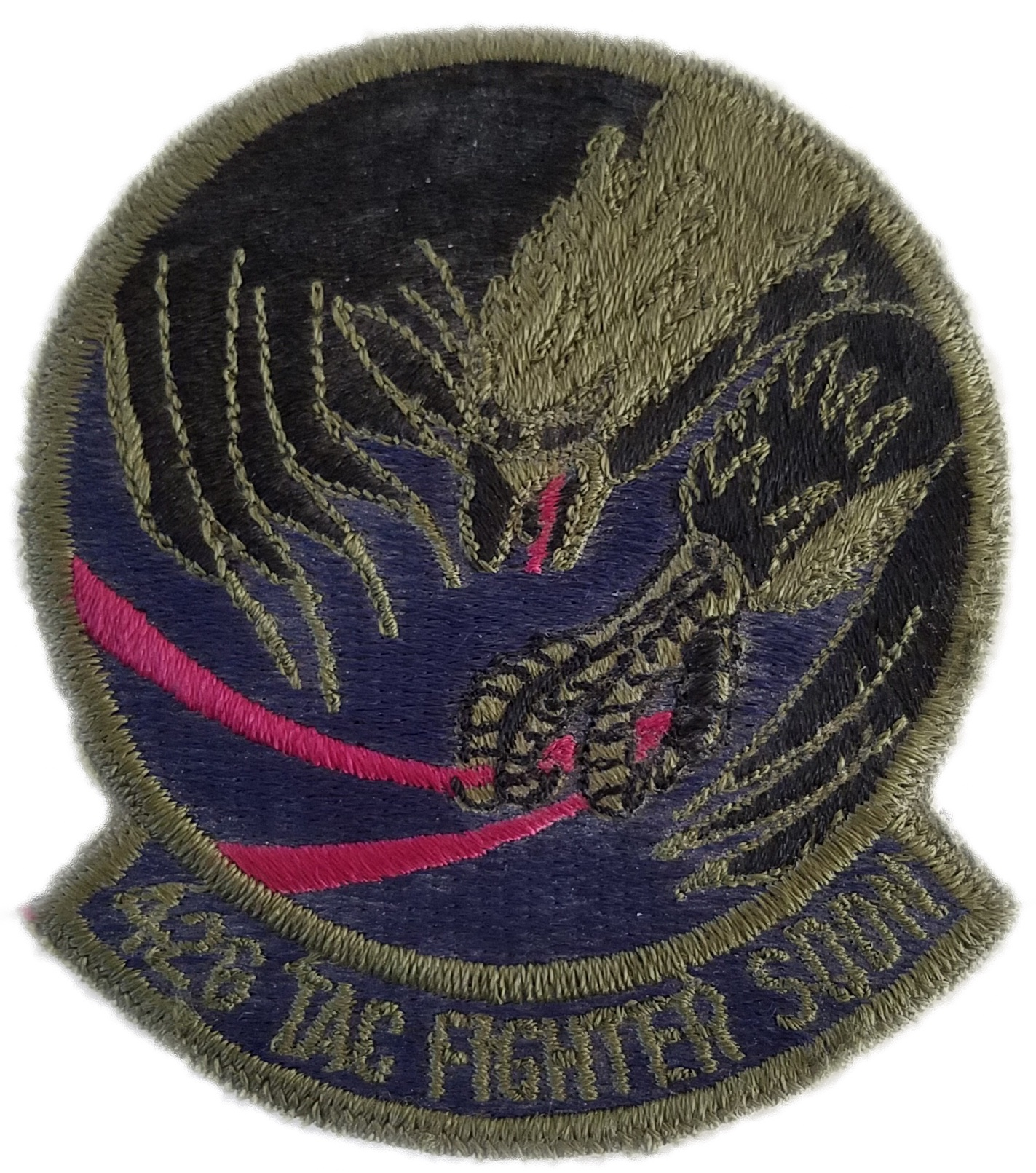
Patch worn by 426th TFTS during the early 1980s

The 426th Tactical Fighter Training Squadron is an inactive United States Air Force fighter squadron. Its last assignment was with the 405th Tactical Training Wing, being inactivated at Luke Air Force Base, Arizona, on 19 November 1990.

During World War II, the 426th Night Fighter Squadron was a night fighter squadron assigned to Tenth Air Force in India, and Fourteenth Air Force in China. It was reactivated in 1970 as a tactical fighter Replacement Training Unit (RTU) at Luke AFB.

== History ==
=== World War II ===
The 426th Night Fighter Squadron was formed at Hammer Field, California in January 1944. It was the first night fighter squadron formed in California and was the first programmed for deployment to the China-Burma-India Theater of Operations. It and the 427th Night Fighter Squadron were also the first squadrons fully trained on the Northrup P-61 Black Widow night fighter. The two squadrons remained close to each other through their training cycles, flying training missions in the Bakersfield area. With its training as a unit completed, the members of 426th NFS packed their bags and left California's sunny San Joaquin Valley in mid-June 1944.

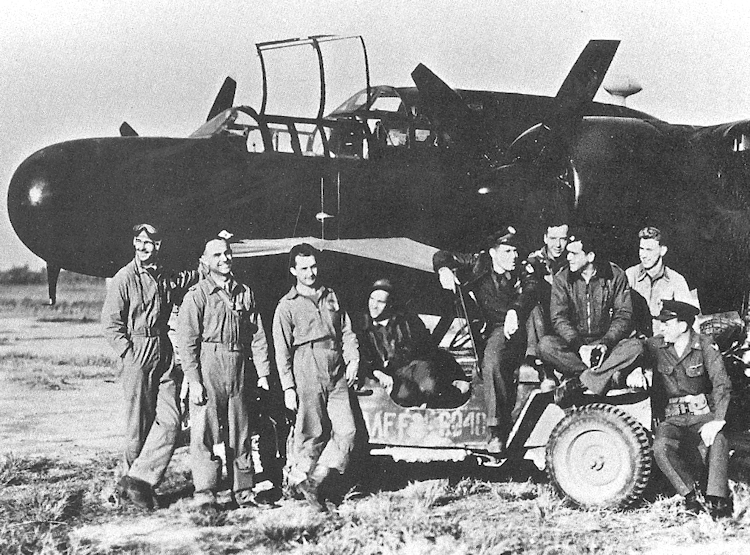
Aircrews of the 426th Night Fighter Squadron at their first operational base at Chengtu, China, 1944. From Chengtu, their mission was to protect B-29 Superfortresses using Chinese Air Bases as staging bases from India on Operation Matterhorn Missions to Japan. After the B-29s moved to the Central Pacific, the Black Widows were used for night intruder and ground attack missions during daylight hours.

The squadron took a long route getting to India, traveling across the United States to Newport News, Virginia, where they boarded the USS General A. E. Anderson for India. Arriving on 8 August, they boarded a train that took them to their next stop, Calcutta. Their destination, for a while at least, was Camp Kanchapara, about forty miles from Calcutta. They would have quite a bit of time on their hands, because it wasn't until late September that their P-61 Black Widows arrived by ship in Calcutta.

During this period, some of the ground echelon was sent to Sylhet (now part of Bangladesh), on temporary duty with a combat cargo unit. When P-61s were unloaded on the Calcutta docks on 25 September, these partially disassembled craft were transported to Barrackpore where they were reassembled by the Air Service Command. Once checked out, the 426th NFS took possession of the planes and flew them to Madhaiganj Air Base. During the next couple of weeks, the planes would be rotated to Ondal, where Air Service Command modified them (one of the modifications being additional radio equipment).

5 October marked the start of the 426th's combat deployment; four aircraft were sent to Chengtu Airfield, China, Upon their arrival the mission of the 426th NFS was night defense for the Twentieth Air Force B-29 Superfortresses based there. The 426th replaced the P-51B Mustangs of the 311th Fighter Group that had escorted the B-29s. However, as the 426th was several aircraft short of its full complement, the 311th transferred eight of its Mustangs to the squadron. By the end of October, the 426th was up-to-strength with P-61s at Chengtu. On 27 October, a detachment of the 426th initiated operations out of Kunming, China, where Fourteenth Air Force was headquartered.

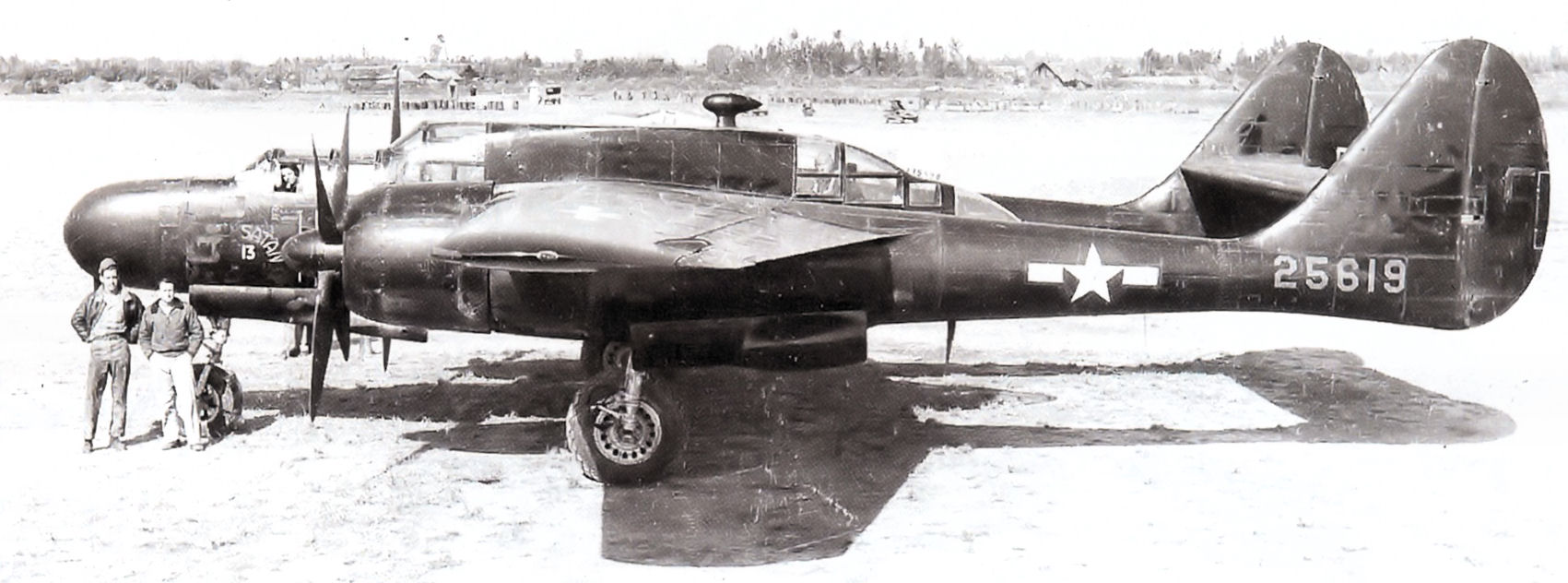
426th Night Fighter Squadron Northrop P-61A-10-NO Black Widow 42-5619

The Japanese were well aware of the P-61s effectiveness, however many bomber crews were aware that there were too few of them to cover the entire Chinese front. Another issue faced by the Americans was that the terrain in China was very rugged and it caused permanent echoes on radar. This made picking out enemy aircraft very difficult, and because of this, the Japanese flew many of their aircraft low to the ground. It was impossible for the P-61s airborne radar to pick up the enemy aircraft without the help of ground-based interceptor radar, so in many areas, the freelance interceptions by the P-61s was almost impossible.

Bomber escort missions continued until February 1945, when Japanese night fighter flying against the B-29s nearly ceased. More and more, the squadron flew night intruder missions. The 426th started staging out of Ankang, Liangshan, and Sian (now known as Xi'an), China, from which they attacked communication, motor transport and railway lines until the end of the war.

With the war finally ending in August, in September 1945, the 426th returned to India, where some of the squadron left from Karachi (now part of Pakistan) and others from Calcutta, India for their return voyage home. The squadron was inactivated on 8 November 1945.

=== Cold War ===
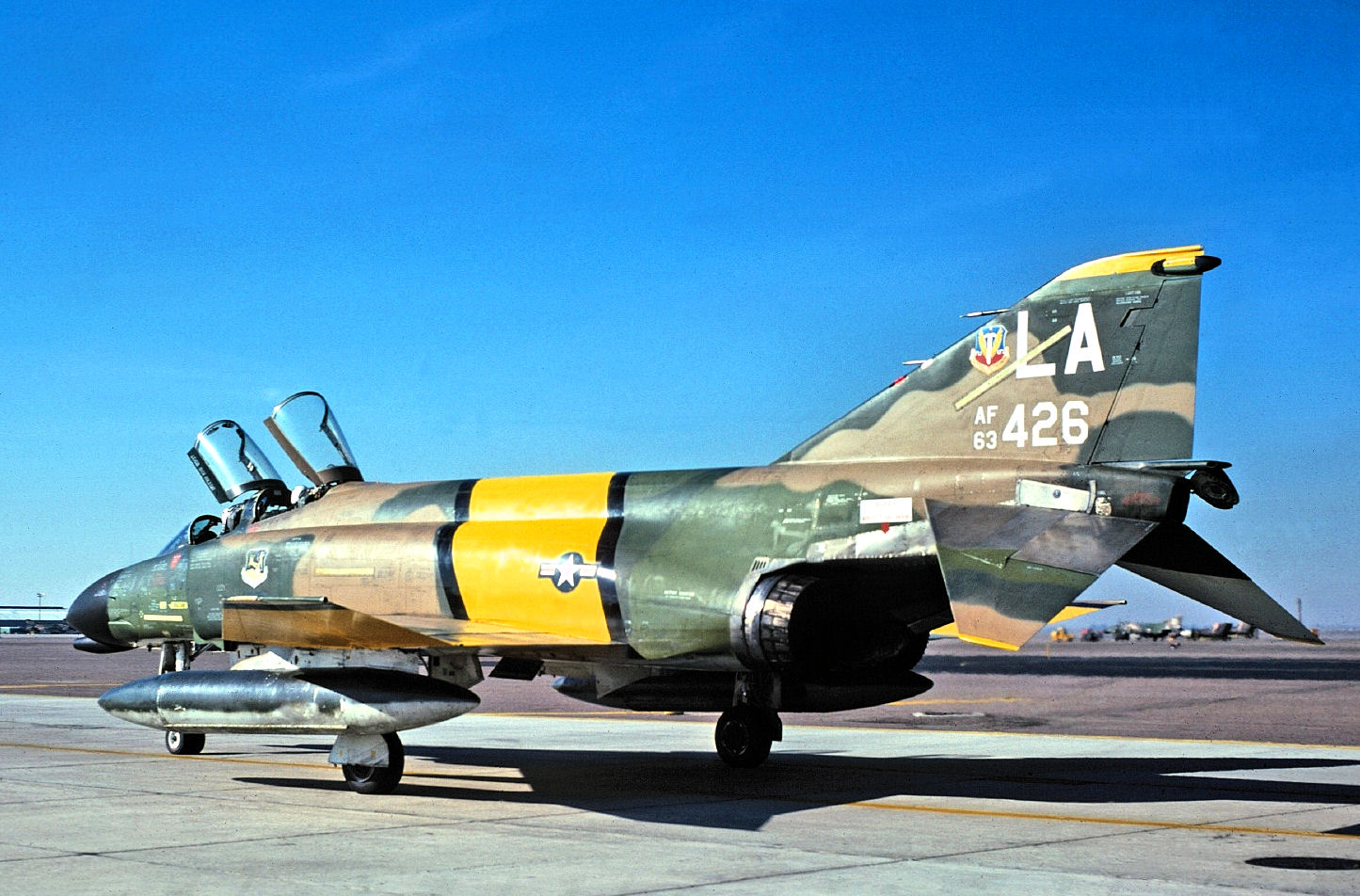
426th TFTS F-4C-16-MC Phantom F-4C 63-7426. Later converted to an GF-4C instructional airframe at Sheppard AFB, TX. Now an on pedestal there

In 1970, the 426th Tactical Fighter Training Squadron was assigned to the 58th Tactical Fighter Training Wing at Luke AFB, Arizona from 18 January 1970 until being reassigned to the 405th Tactical Training Wing on 1 January 1981 Squadron carried tail code "LA". The squadron was initially equipped with the F-100D Super Sabres that it inherited from the provisional 4515th Combat Crew Training Squadron. Its mission was to train Aerospace Defense Command (ADCOM) fighter-interceptor squadron pilots flying F-106 Delta Darts to intercept intruder aircraft. The F-100s would act as supersonic intruder aircraft in training flights over the large desert ranges of Arizona. As part of the phase-out of the F-100 from active service, it received McDonnell F-4C Phantom IIs in August 1971, with aircraft carrying a blue fin cap.

In 1981 the squadron received F-15A/B Eagles, and its mission was changed to train interceptor pilots with the F-15, which was beginning to replace the F-106 Delta Dart in the air defense mission of the United States. The F-15s carried red tail stripes by 1983 and added a yellow centered delta shape. The squadron also flew some F-15D models in 1989. It was inactivated in 1990 when the air defense training on the F-15 was moved to Tyndall AFB, Florida and to First Air Force as part of the realignment of air defense of the United States from the active-duty air force to the Air National Guard.

=== Lineage ===
- Constituted as: 426th Night Fighter Squadron on 8 December 1943

Activated on: 1 January 1944
Inactivated: 5 November 1945

- Re-designated: 426th Tactical Fighter Training Squadron, 18 January 1970

Activated 18 January 1970 assuming the assets of the 4515th Combat Crew Training Squadron (Provisional)
Inactivated: 29 November 1990

=== Assignments ===
- Fourth Air Force

IV Fighter Command, 1 January 1944
481st Night Fighter Operational Training Group, 7 February 1944 – 18 June 1944

- Tenth Air Force, 11 June 1944
- Army Air Force, India-Burma Sector, 22 August 1944
- Fourteenth Air Force. November 1944 – 5 November 1945

Attached to 312th Fighter Wing, February–5 November 1945

- 58th Tactical Fighter Training Wing, 18 January 1970 – 1 January 1981
- 405th Tactical Training Wing, 1 January 1981 – 19 November 1990

=== Stations ===
- Hammer Field, California, 1 January 1944
- Delano Airport, California, 31 March – 15 June 1944
- Dum Dum Airport, India 29 June 1944
- Madhaiganj Airfield, India, 9 August 1944
- Chengtu Airfield, China, 5 October 1944 – 15 March 1945

Detachment: Kunming Airport, China, 27 October – 25 December 1944
Detachment: Hsian Airfield, China, 27 November 1944 – 17 October 1945
Detachment: Guskhara Airfield, India, January–August 1945

- Shwangliu Airfield, China, 15 March 1945 – September 1945

Detachment: Liangshan Airfield, China, – 19 April August 1945
Detachment: Ankang Airfield, China, – 21 April August 1945

- Unit began relocating to Shwangliu Airfield, China on 17 August 1945
- India (undetermined location), September–October 1945
- Camp Kilmer, New Jersey, 3 November–5, 1945.
- Luke Air Force Base, Arizona, 18 January 1970 – 19 November 1990

=== Aircraft flown ===
- P-61 Black Widow, 1944–1945
- P-70 Havoc, 1944
- F-100D Super Sabre, 1970–1971
- F-4C Phantom II, 1971–1980
- F-15A/B/D Eagle, 1981–1990

== See also ==
- 481st Night Fighter Operational Training Group
