= 405th Air Expeditionary Wing =

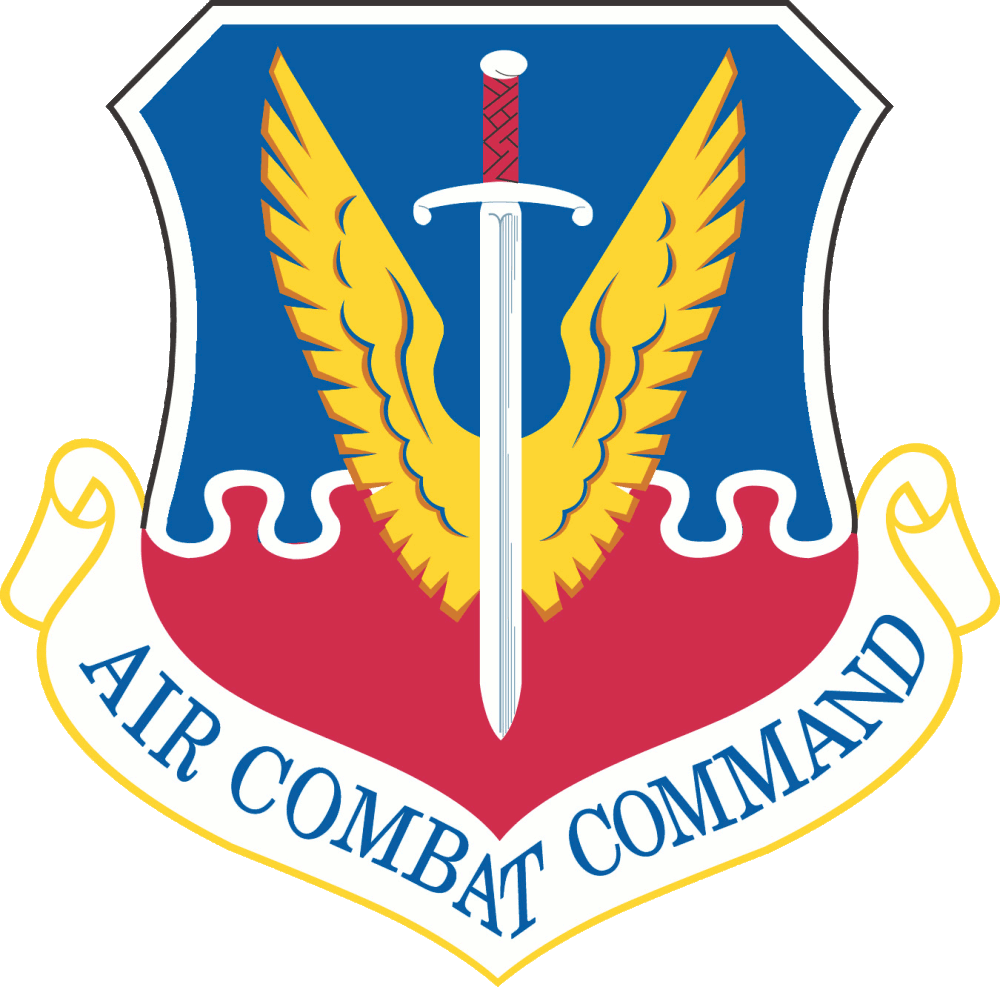
405th Air Expeditionary Wing

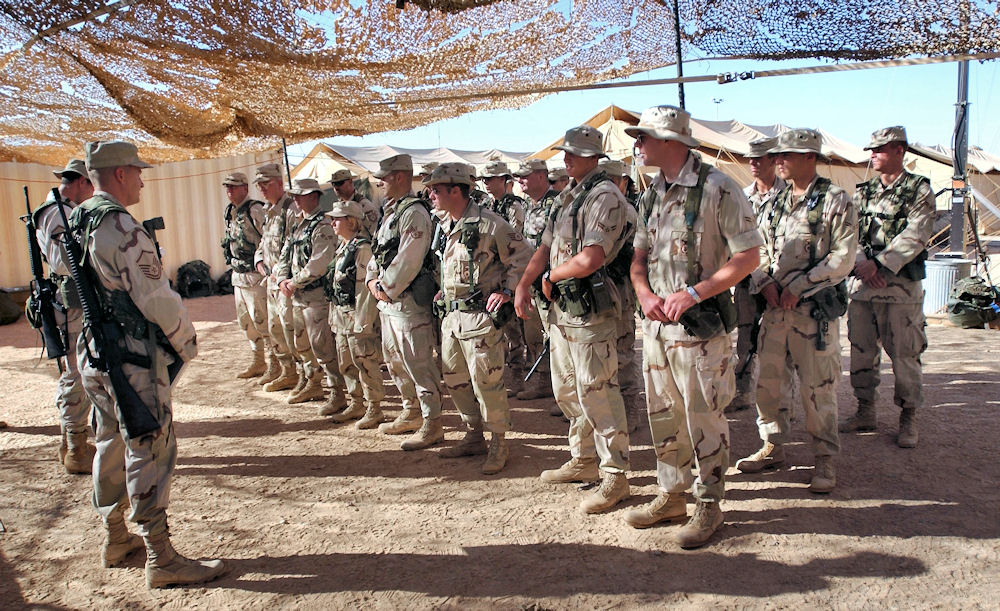
- Security forces from the 405th Air Expeditionary Wing listen to instruction during guard mount at an Operation Enduring Freedom location (Note: Guard mount is conducted to brief security forces troops before a shift change.)
- Active: 1952–1958; 1959–1974; 1979–1991; after 2001
- Country: United States
- Branch: United States Air Force
- Part of: Air Combat Command
- Mottos: Novere et Aggredi (Latin for 'Deploy and Attack')

Commanders
- Notable commanders: James Ferguson; James E. Hill; William T. Hobbins; Chuck Horner; Chuck Yeager

Insignia
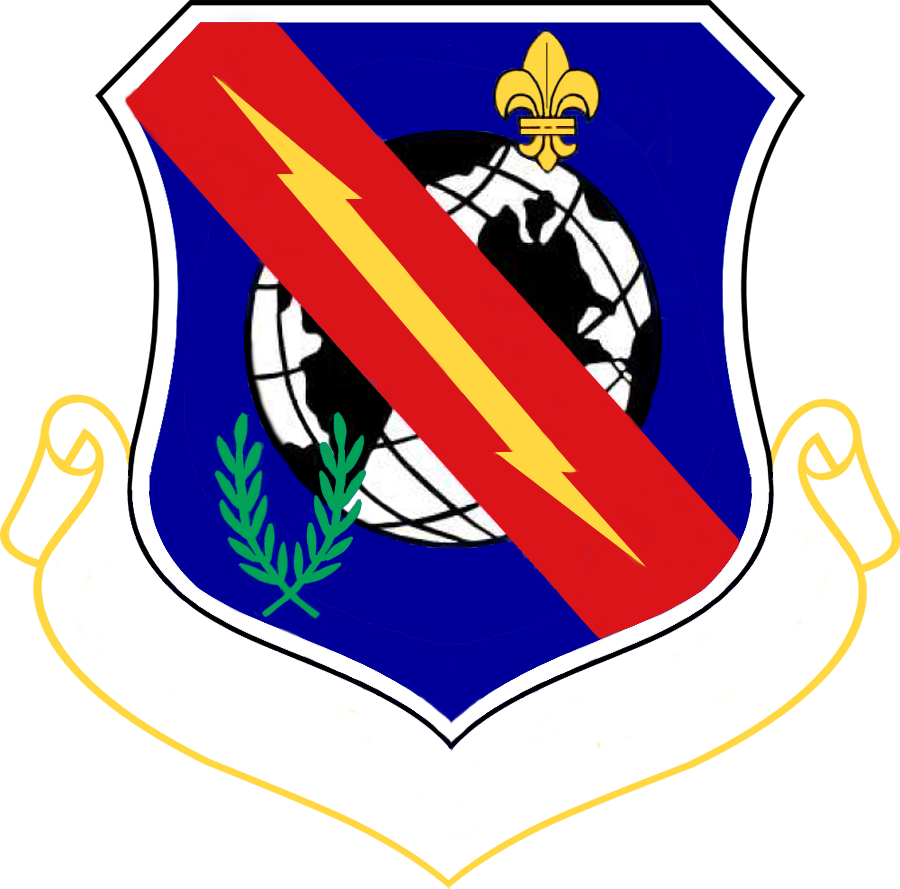
- 405th Air Expeditionary Wing emblem (Note: Approved 10 November 1955. Description: on a shield azure, a sphere argent, land marking and grid lines sable, surmounted by a bend gules, charged with a lightning flash or, between a fleur-de-lis of the last [color mentioned], and two olive branches in saltire proper, all within a diminutive bordure of the second [color].)

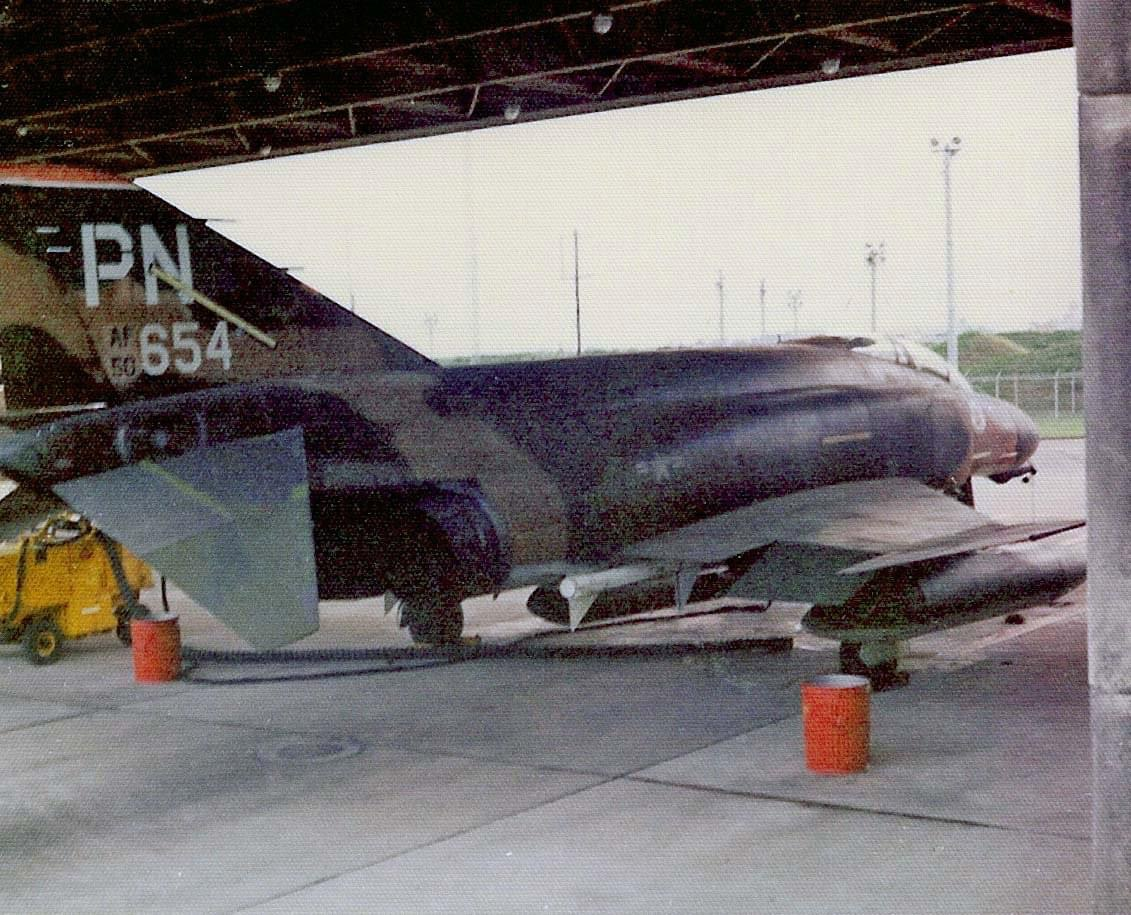
Wing F-4D Phantom on alert at Tainan Air Base (Note: Aircraft is McDonnell F-4D-27-MC Phantom II, serial 65-0654 with Detachment 1 of the 405th Fighter Wing.) 1972

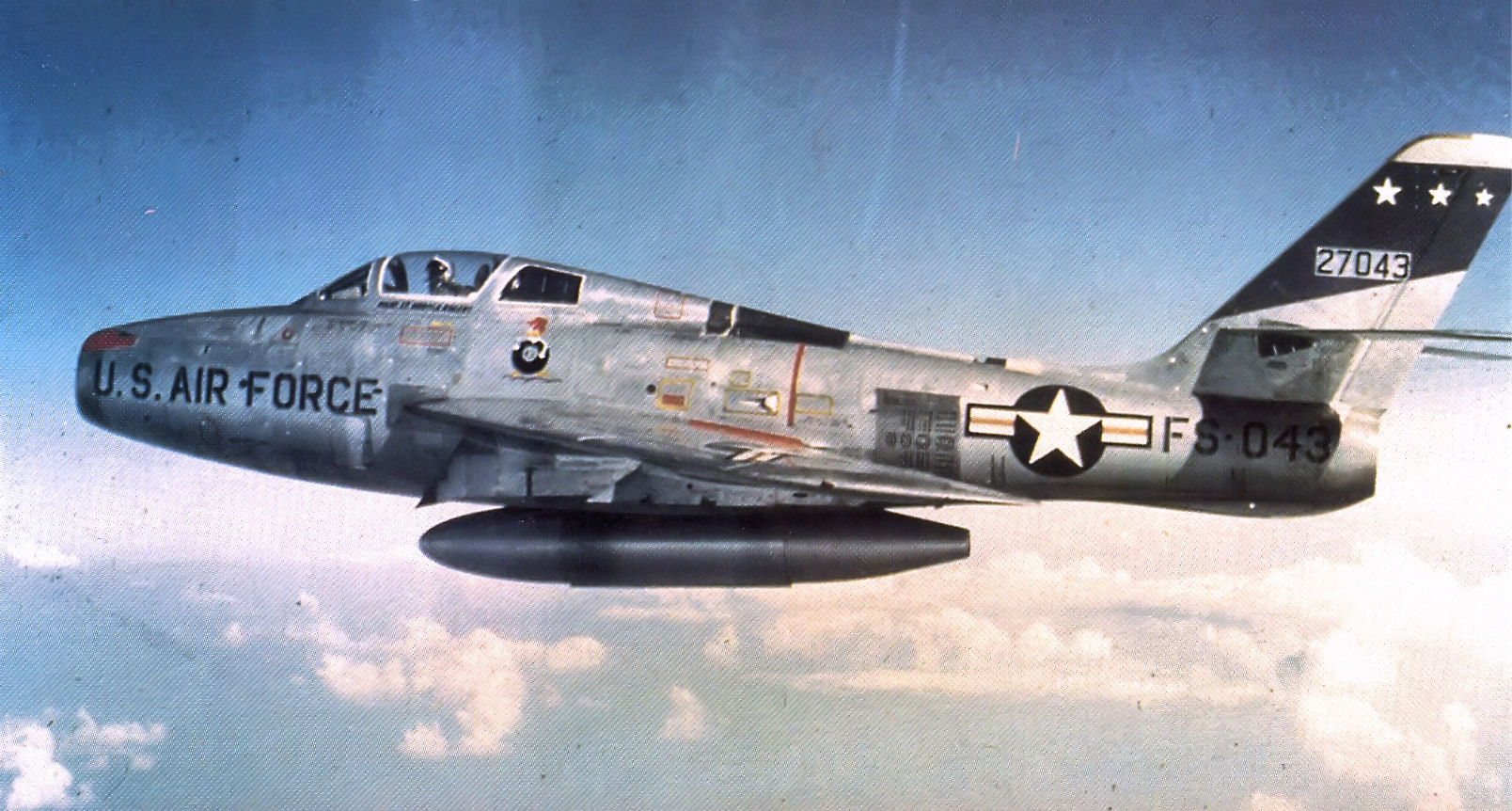
Wing F-84F Thunderstreak at Langley AFB in 1955 (Note: Aircraft is Republic F-84F-35-RE Thunderstreak, serial 52-7043.)

The 405th Air Expeditionary Wing is a provisional United States Air Force unit assigned to Air Combat Command. It may be activated or inactivated at any time.

== History ==
=== Cold War ===
==== Tactical Air Command ====
Established on 1 December 1952 at Godman Air Force Base, Kentucky. The 405th Fighter-Bomber Wing was an active duty replacement for the federalized New Jersey Air National Guard 108th Fighter-Bomber Wing which returned to state control after its activation during the Korean War. The wing's 405th Fighter-Bomber Group was a reactivation of the IX Fighter Command 405th Fighter Group, which had fought in the ETO during World War II.

When activated the group replsced the New Jersey Air National Guard 141st, 149th and 153d Fighter-Bomber Squadrons as the 509th, 510th, and 511th Fighter-Bomber Squadrons. Initially equipped with Republic F-47D and F-47N Thunderbolts inherited from the Air National Guard, the 405th being the last active duty USAF Thunderbolt fighter Wing.

On 1 May 1953, the F-47s were withdrawn and sent to the Military Aircraft Storage and Disposition Center, and the 405th moved to Langley Air Force Base, Virginia due to the programmed closing of Godman on 1 September. At Langley, the 405th replaced the provisional 4430th Air Base Wing and was re-equipped with Republic F-84F Thunderstreak jet aircraft. Also attached to the group was the 422d Bombardment Squadron with Douglas B-26 Invader light bombers (1 May – 20 December 1953) and the 429th Air Refueling Squadron (19 July 1954 – 8 October 1957) with Boeing KB-29 Superfortress tankers. Operations included gunnery and bombardment training, firepower demonstrations, weapons delivery training, and numerous tactical exercises, 1952–1958, plus air refueling, 1954–1958.

==== Pacific Air Forces ====
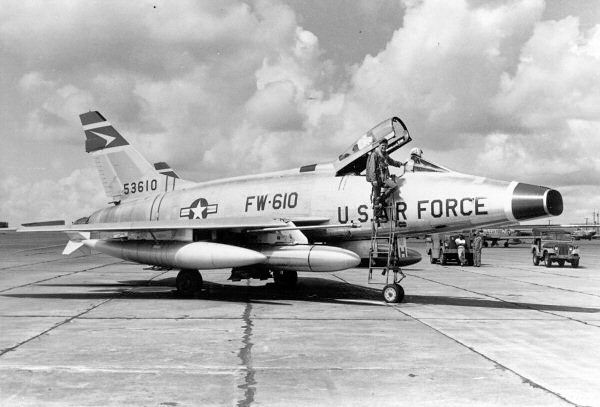
F-100D Super Sabre at Clark AB (Note: Aircraft is North American F-100D-25-NA, serial 55-3610 in 1959.)

The wing was reassigned to Pacific Air Forces in April 1959, replacing the PACAF 6200th Air Base Wing at Clark Air Base, Philippines. This was part of a general buildup of USAF tactical forces in the Southwest Pacific, as Clark in the postwar era was largely a maintenance and supply depot, and the signing of a new Status of Forces agreement with the Philippine Government with regards to Clark AB.

Re-designated as the 405th Fighter Wing, the wing provided host mission duties at Clark as well as air defense and offensive fighter operations in the Philippines, Taiwan, and other Far Eastern points, April 1959 – June 1962. Initially the transferred 509th Fighter-Interceptor Squadron operated North American F-86D Sabre interceptors in an air defense mission, being replaced by Convair F-102 Delta Dagger interceptors in 1960.

The 510th Tactical Fighter Squadron inherited the North American F-100D Super Sabres of the inactivated 72d Tactical Fighter Squadron in a defensive fighter-bomber mission. It began a series of rotational deployments to Chai-Yi Air Base, Taiwan in July 1959 to defend Taiwan as part of an ongoing USAF defense mission after the 1958 Taiwan Strait Crisis.

On 1 April 1961, 405th FW permanently deployed a force to Tainan Air Base, Taiwan in support of Quick Strike Commitment.

In 1964 the 510th was transferred to England Air Force Base, Louisiana. It was replaced by the 90th Tactical Fighter Squadron, which was attached to the 401st by the TAC 834th Air Division at England in November 1965 for a 6-month temporaty duty and returned to England in May 1966.

===== Vietnam War =====
Beginning in 1962, the 510th Tactical Fighter Squadron began deployments to Takhli Royal Thai Air Force Base, Thailand, providing air defense training for Royal Thai Air Force personnel, as well as to try to restrain the Communist Pathet Lao which were busily overrunning most of northwestern Laos.

From mid-1962 until the end of the conflict in Southeast Asia, the wing frequently deployed assigned and attached components to bases in Southeast Asia for air defense and combat operations under operational control of other organizations. When not so involved, components trained in air defense and other tactical exercises in Taiwan and the Philippines.

====== B-57B light bombers ======
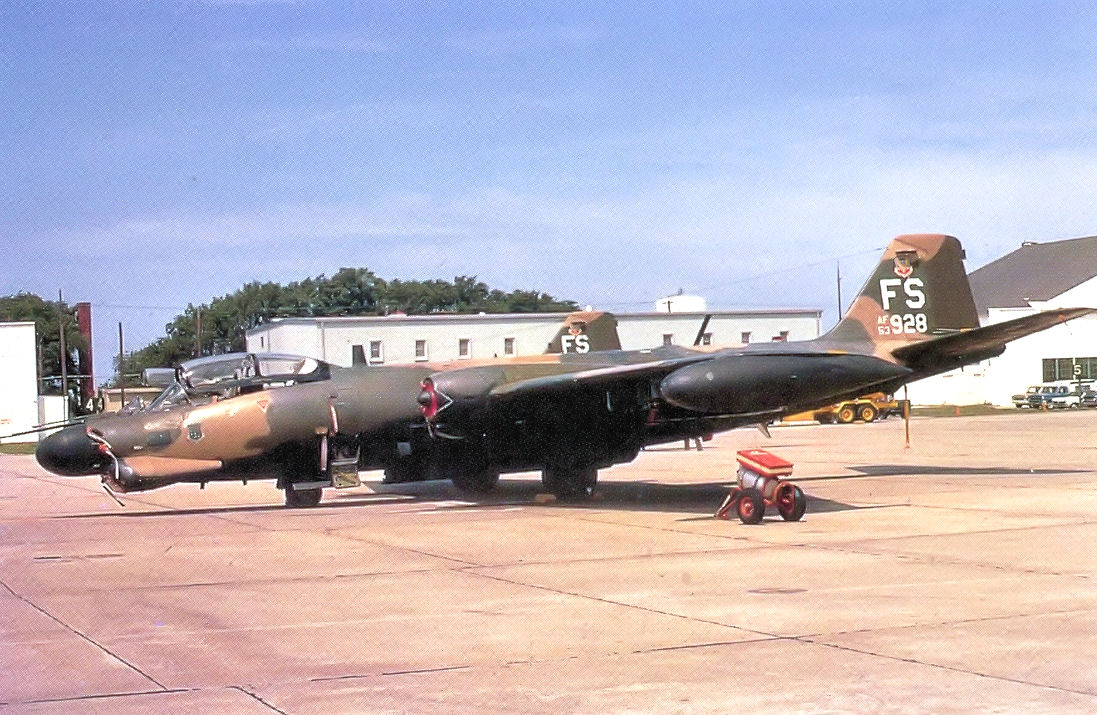
8th Bombardment Squadron B-57B Canberra after its return to the United States (Note: Aircraft is Martin B-57B-MA, serial 53-0928 in 1974.)

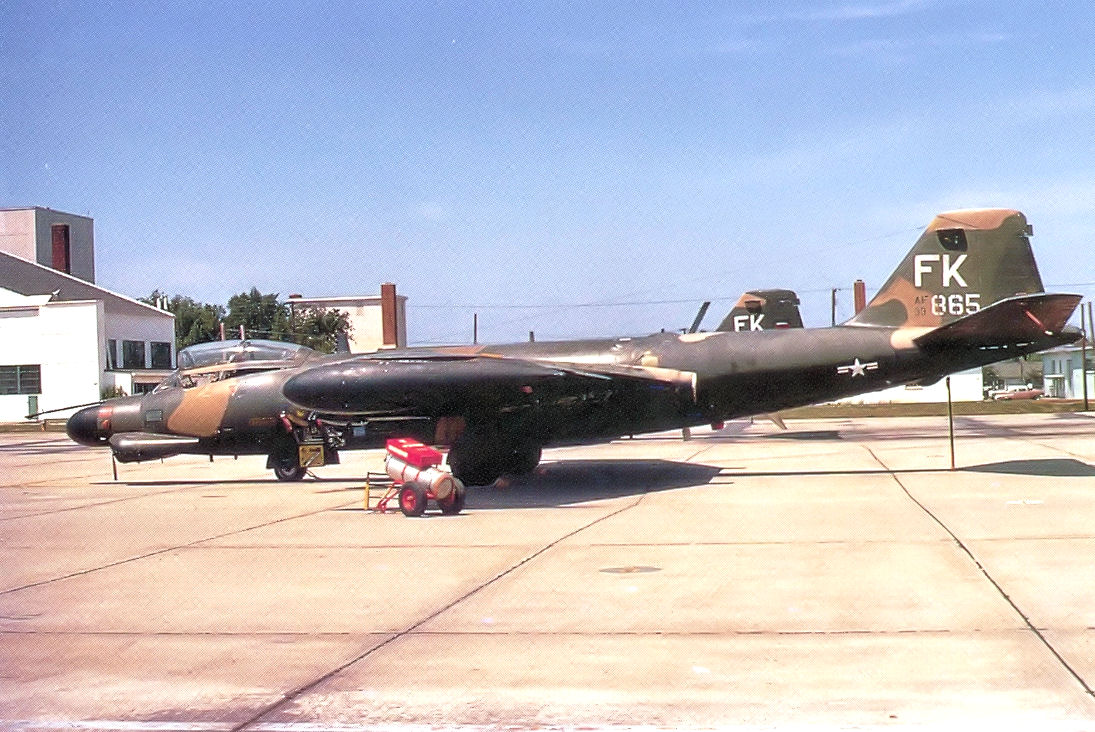
13th Bombardment Squadron B-57B Canberra after its return to the United States (Note: Aircraft is Martin B-57B-MA, serial 53-0865. Photo taken at Forbes Air Force Base, Kansas shortly after aircraft was returned to the United States. Photo (and the one above) show aircraft after being assigned to the 190th Bombardment Group, Kansas Air National Guard. Both had been converted to the B-57G night intruder version where they served until 1974, when they were consigned to storage at Davis Monthan AFB.)

In April 1964, the situation in Indochina led to orders for the PACAF 41st Air Division Martin B-57B Canberra 8th and 13th Bombardment Squadrons to be reassigned from rotational nuclear "quick strike" alert in South Korea to Thirteenth Air Force at Clark for possible tactical bombardment missions against communist aggressor forces in South Vietnam. On 9 April 1965, the first Canberras of the 13th Bomb Squadron began arriving at Clark; the 8th began arriving on 17 April. By the end of the month all 47 of the former 3d Bomb Wing's aircraft arrived in the Philippines. The squadrons were assigned to Thirteenthth Air Force, however they were attached to the 405th Wing for administrative and logistical support.

During the summer of 1964, a war of nerves was taking place between the United States, North and South Vietnam. United States ground forces were present in South Vietnam, officially in an advisory role to the Army of the Republic of Vietnam (ARVN) at the invitation of the South Vietnamese government. United States forces could not attack communist forces unless provoked by aggressive action of the communist Viet Cong, or in some cases, by North Vietnamese Army (NVA) ground units in the South.

On the night of 2 August 1964 the Gulf of Tonkin incident occurred in which North Vietnamese gunboats directly clashed with United States Navy destroyers. At Clark, the base went on alert and the atmosphere was that of a wartime appearance. Fighter Squadrons were deploying to USAF bases in Thailand, and transports began shipping supplies and equipment to South Vietnamese bases used by the United States. The two B-57 squadrons went on alert and on 5 August the squadrons were notified to deploy 20 B-57Bs of the 8th and 13th Squadrons to Bien Hoa Air Base. This would mark the first deployment of jet combat aircraft to Vietnam.

However, this was technically a violation of the Geneva Protocols which forbade the introduction of jet combat aircraft to Vietnam. To abide by the Geneva protocols, both squadrons rotated frequently over the next four years first to Bien Hoa, then to later Tan Son Nhut Air Base. In November 1964, both squadrons were transferred from Thirteenth Air Force control to the 405th Fighter Wing at Clark.

Rotations were moved to Da Nang Air Base in June 1965 to facilitate attacks in Laos and North Vietnam, but high attrition rates over the North led to the movement to Phan Rang Air Base on the south central coast in June 1966. Finally, in October 1966 the 35th Tactical Fighter Wing moved to Phan Rang and took over the units on a permanent basis.

In late December 1972, the 13th Bombardment Squadron returned to the 405th from the 8th Tactical Fighter Wing at Ubon Royal Thai Air Force Base, Thailand with B-57G Canberras, which were B-57B that had been returned to Martin in 1969 and modified as night intruders for use in Vietnam in September 1970 under a project known as Tropic Moon. The B-57s, however were transferred almost immediately back to the United States and assigned to the 190th Bombardment Group (Tactical) of the Kansas Air National Guard at Forbes Air Force Base. The 13th Squadron remained assigned to the wing as an administrative unit until it was inactivated on 30 September 1973.

====== South Vietnam B-57 program ======
In 1964, the United States secretly agreed to supply a few B-57Bs to the Republic of Vietnam Air Force. The United States had initially been reluctant to equip the Vietnamese Air Force with jet aircraft, since this would be a technical violation of the Geneva Accords and might further escalate the war. However, the US had already equipped other friendly nations in the region with jet aircraft, and pressure from the government leadership in Saigon coupled with a need to boost the sagging morale of the South Vietnamese people, led to a change of heart.

The first VNAF B-57 crews began training in secret with 405th aircraft at Clark AB later in 1964. One of the students was none other than Nguyen Cao Ky, the commander of the VNAF and later president of the Republic of Vietnam. As the crews completed their training at Clark, they went to Da Nang Air Base and flew combat missions with the 405th's 8th or 13th Bombardment Squadrons, whichever happened to be on station at the time. To gain combat experience, each new crewmember flew with an American pilot or navigator, whichever the case may be. Eventually, the VNAF crew members flew in VNAF-marked B-57s, but their combat missions always remained strictly under USAF operational control. The South Vietnamese government felt at this stage that the VNAF B-57 program should be given some more visibility, and to celebrate Vietnamese Armed Forces Day, on 29 October 1965, five B-57s from the 8th Bombardment Squadron, then based at Da Nang, were repainted with VNAF insignia and carried out an air strike against a suspected Viet Cong stronghold and landed Tan Son Nhut Air Base. After landing, the planes took off again and joined other VNAF aircraft in a formation flyover of Saigon. Although manned solely by American crews, this attack was heralded as the introduction of VNAF B-57s into combat.

However, Republic of Vietnam Air Force pilots had severe difficulties operating the B-57. Vietnamese crews suddenly began to complain of various illnesses, which grounded many trainees and brought their training to a standstill. In addition, on 8 January 1966 a B-57 was destroyed in a training accident, further lowering morale. Some Vietnamese crews flatly stated that they could not physically perform the maneuvers required in the B-57. To make matters even worse, Major Nguyen Ngoc Bien, the leader of the VNAF B-57 program, was killed in a freak ground accident on 23 February 1966 at Da Nang. The death of Major Bien, who was well-liked and well-respected by both Vietnamese and Americans, resulted in a complete loss of any incentive for the Vietnamese crewmen to stay with the B-57, and from this point on there was very little Vietnamese activity in the B-57 program. On 20 April 1967, the VNAF B-57 operation was formally terminated.

====== F-102 interceptors ======
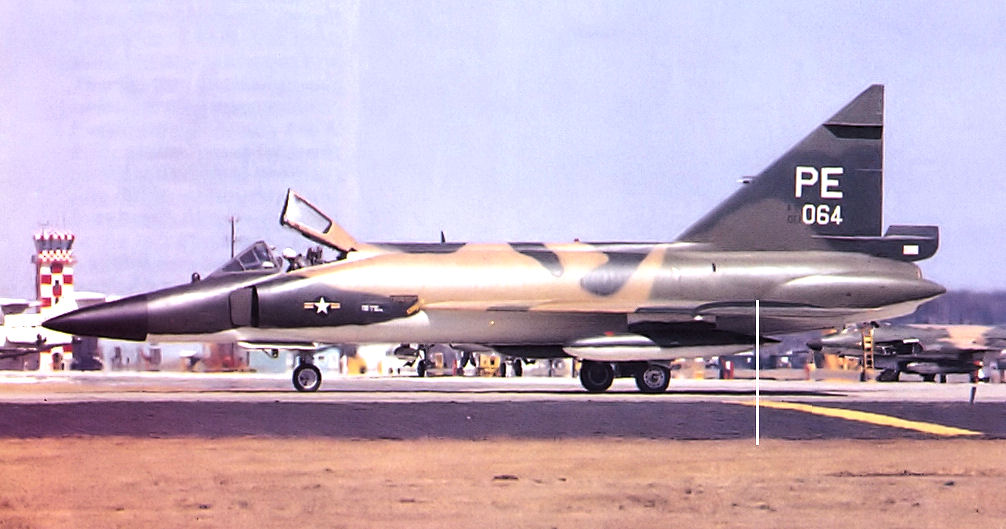
64th Fighter-Interceptor Squadron F-102A Delta Dagger (Note: Aircraft is Convair F-102A-60-CO Delta Dagger, serial 56-1064 at Clark Air Base in 1967.)

Flights of F-102 interceptors from the 509th Fighter-Interceptor Squadron began to deploy to Tan Son Nhut Air Base in March 1962 to provide air defense against the unlikely event that North Vietnamese aircraft would attack the South. They also deployed to Don Muang Royal Thai Air Force Base near Bangkok, Thailand and began exchanging rotational duty with the 16th Fighter-Interceptor Squadron based at Naha Air Base on Okinawa. In 1965, operating under the code-name "Project Stovepipe", 509th FIS F-102s used their heat sinking Falcon missiles to lock onto heat sources over the Ho Chi Minh Trail at night, often Viet Cong campfires. The F-102s soon switched to a day role, firing the 12 unguided FFAR rockets from the missile bays, using the optical sight. 618-day sorties were flown, the last one being flown at the end of 1965.

The Air Defense Command 64th Fighter-Interceptor Squadron was deployed from the 25th Air Division at Paine Field, Washington to Clark AB and assigned to the 405th on 10 June 1966 to supplement the F-102 mission in Southeast Asia as well as provide air defense for the Philippines. F-102s stood rotational alert at Bien Hoa and Da Nang Air Bases in South Vietnam and at Udorn and Don Muang Air Bases in Thailand. The F-102A was finally withdrawn from Southeast Asia in December 1969 with the phaseout of the aircraft from the USAF inventory, also the clear lack of need for a dedicated air defense interceptor over South Vietnam. The F-102A established an excellent safety record during its duty in Vietnam. In almost seven years of flying air defense and a few combat air patrols for SAC B-52s, only 15 F-102As were lost.

===== Post-Vietnam era =====
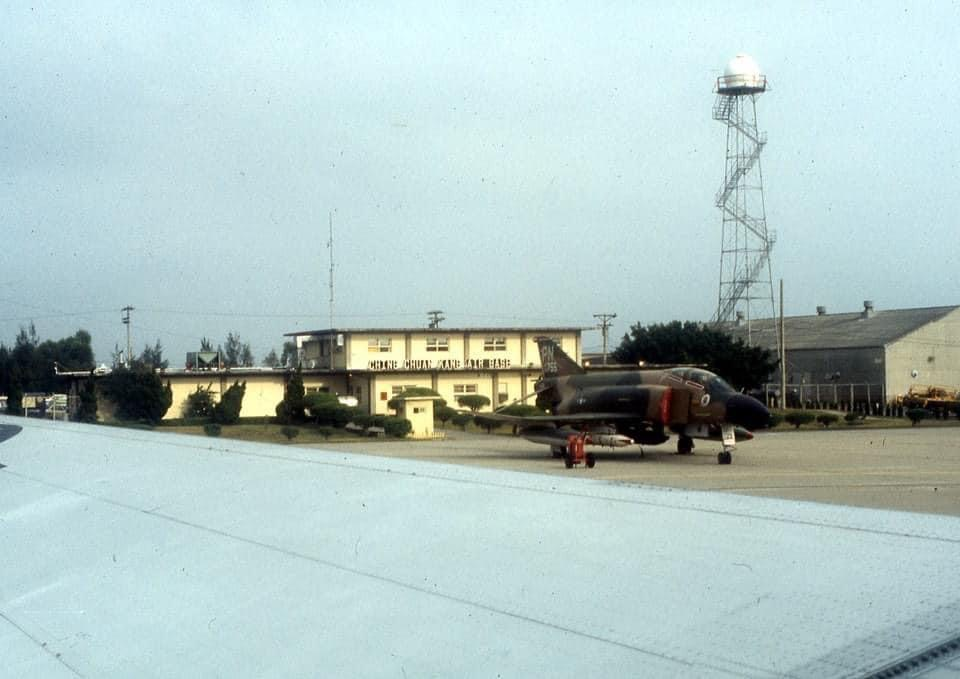
F-4D Detachment of the 90th Tactical Fighter Squadron at CCK Air Base, Taiwan, 1974

The 1st Test Squadron conducted weapons system evaluation (Combat Sage) of repaired battle-damaged McDonnell F-4 Phantom IIs from 30 April 1970 until the end of the Vietnam War. It remained assigned to the 405th until the wing's re-designation in September 1974.

The 90th Tactical Fighter Squadron returned to Clark and the 405th on 15 December 1972 after being withdrawn from the 18th Tactical Fighter Wing at Nha Trang Air Base, South Vietnam as part of the Vietnam drawdown. It flew F-4E Phantom IIs also until the 405th's inactivation in September 1974.

During July–August 1972, provided extensive flood relief to Philippine areas inundated by monsoon rains. During February–March 1973, provided medical, logistical, and administrative support for former prisoners of war, on their way to the United States from North Vietnam. With the end of the USAF presence in South Vietnam, the wing was re-designated as the 3d Tactical Fighter Wing in September 1974 to retain the history of the senior unit after its standdown as part of the closure of Bien Hoa.

The 405th Fighter Wing also deployed an F-4 Phantom II contingent in Tainan Air Base, Taiwan. Until July 1974, The main mission was to assist Taiwan's air defense, as well as the use of tactical nuclear weapons.

==== Tactical Training Wing ====
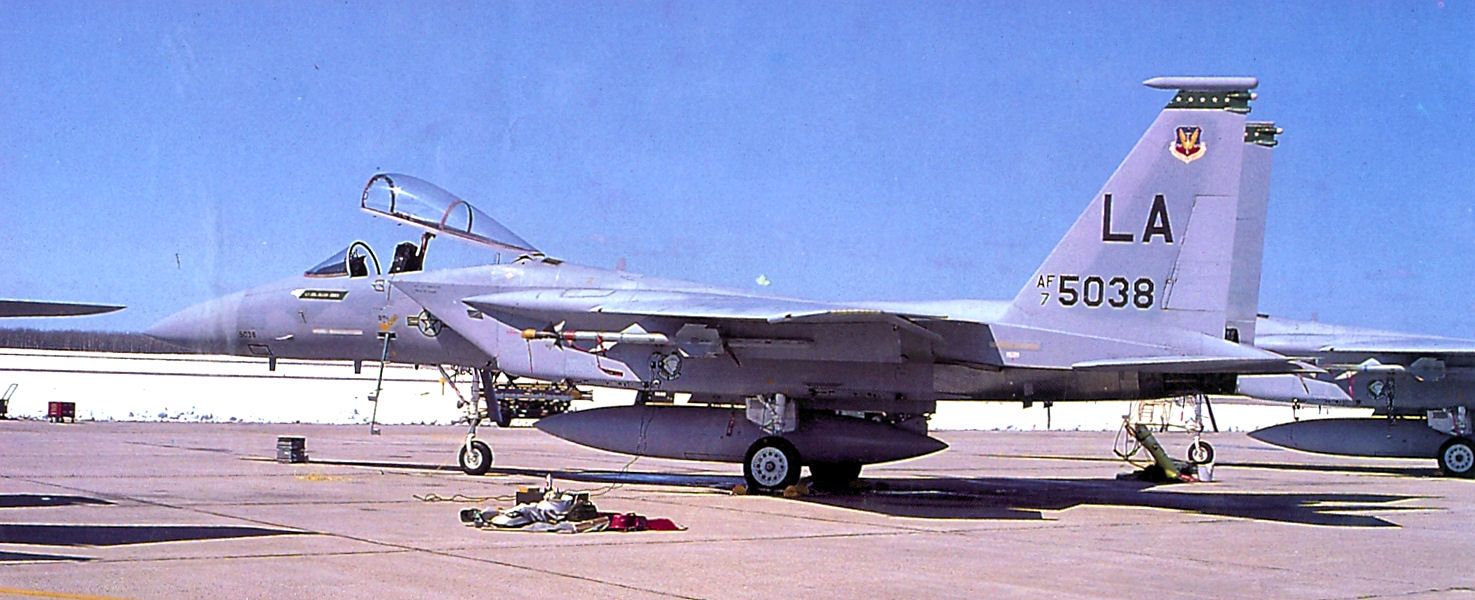
555th Tactical Fighter Training Squadron F-15A Eagle (Note: Aircraft is McDonnell Douglas F-15A-13-MC Eagle, serial 75-0038. it was sent to AMARC on 10 September 1992.)

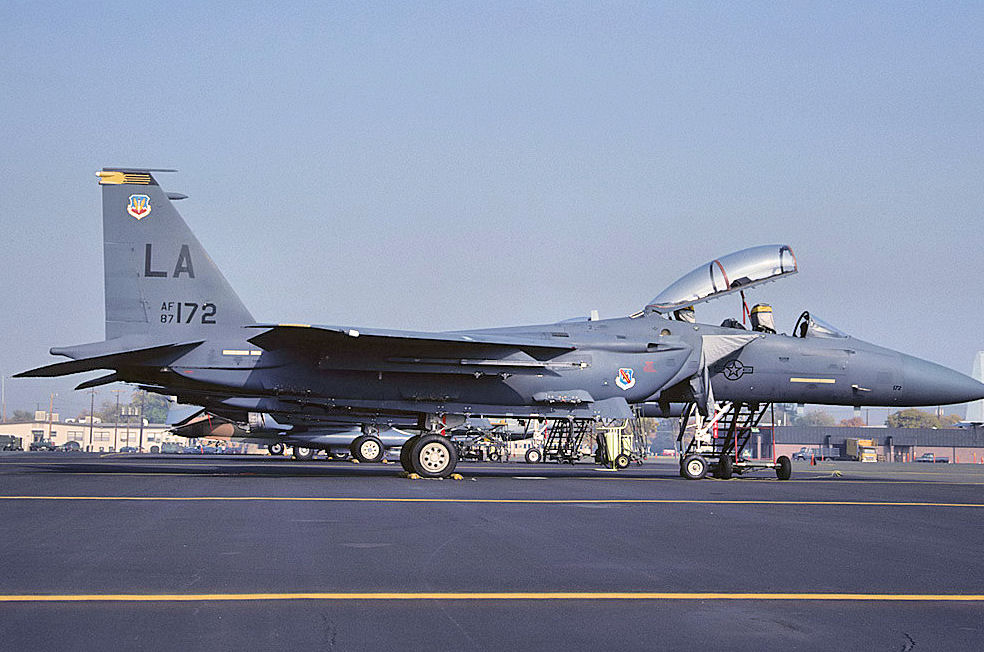
461st Tactical Fighter Training Squadron F-15E Strike Eagle (Note: Aircraft is McDonnell Douglas F-15E-43-MC Strike Eagle, serial 87–0172 in 1990. This aircraft Crashed 42 nautical miles south-south-west of Gila Bend, Arizona on 16 September 1991. The pilot survived.)

On 25 August 1979, the 405th Tactical Training Wing was activated at Luke Air Force Base, Arizona by Tactical Air Command (TAC) to consolidate the McDonnell Douglas F-15 Eagle Replacement Training Unit operations. It took over the 425th, 461st 550th and 555th Tactical Fighter Training Squadrons from the 58th Tactical Training Wing. The F-15As were replaced by the much more capable F-15C in January 1981 which was being delivered to front-line USAF combat squadrons.

With the upgrading to the F-15C, the lowest-hour F-15As were transferred to the 426th Tactical Fighter Training Squadron which converted from F-4 Phantom II. The 426th provided F-15A interceptor training specifically to support the Air Defense Tactical Air Command training mission inherited from the inactivated Aerospace Defense Command which was merged into TAC.

On 19 November 1990, the 555th Squadron changed its course from air superiority combat training with the Eagle to air defense interceptor training with the F-15C when TAC began assigning F-15Cs to Air National Guard interceptor duty and phasing out the F-15A all together, the 426th being inactivated.

The 461st Squadron received first F-15E Strike Eagle in July 1988, and the 550th Squadron became the second F-15E Strike Eagle training squadron in March 1989.

On 1 October 1991, due to the implementation of the Objective Wing at Luke and the "One base, one wing" policy, the 405th was inactivated and the F-15s were reassigned back to the 58th Tactical Training Wing.

=== Twenty-first century ===
Reactivated as the 405th Air Expeditionary Wing after the September 11 terrorist attacks in 2001 attacks as part of USCENTAF. Bombed targets in Afghanistan during the beginning of the War in Afghanistan (2001-2021); flew bombing missions during the War in Iraq from 2002; carried out operations over the Horn of Africa. Based at RAFO Thumrait. Flew B-1, AWACS, KC-135, and RC-135 aircraft, and possibly others.

As of April 2002 Brigadier General Wendell Griffin was the 405th Air Expeditionary Wing commander. Colonel Wendell Griffin was the 7th Bomb Wing commander at Dyess AFB during 2001.

A National Guard squadron from the 108th Air Refueling Wing was deployed to Thumrait in early 2002.

== Lineage ==
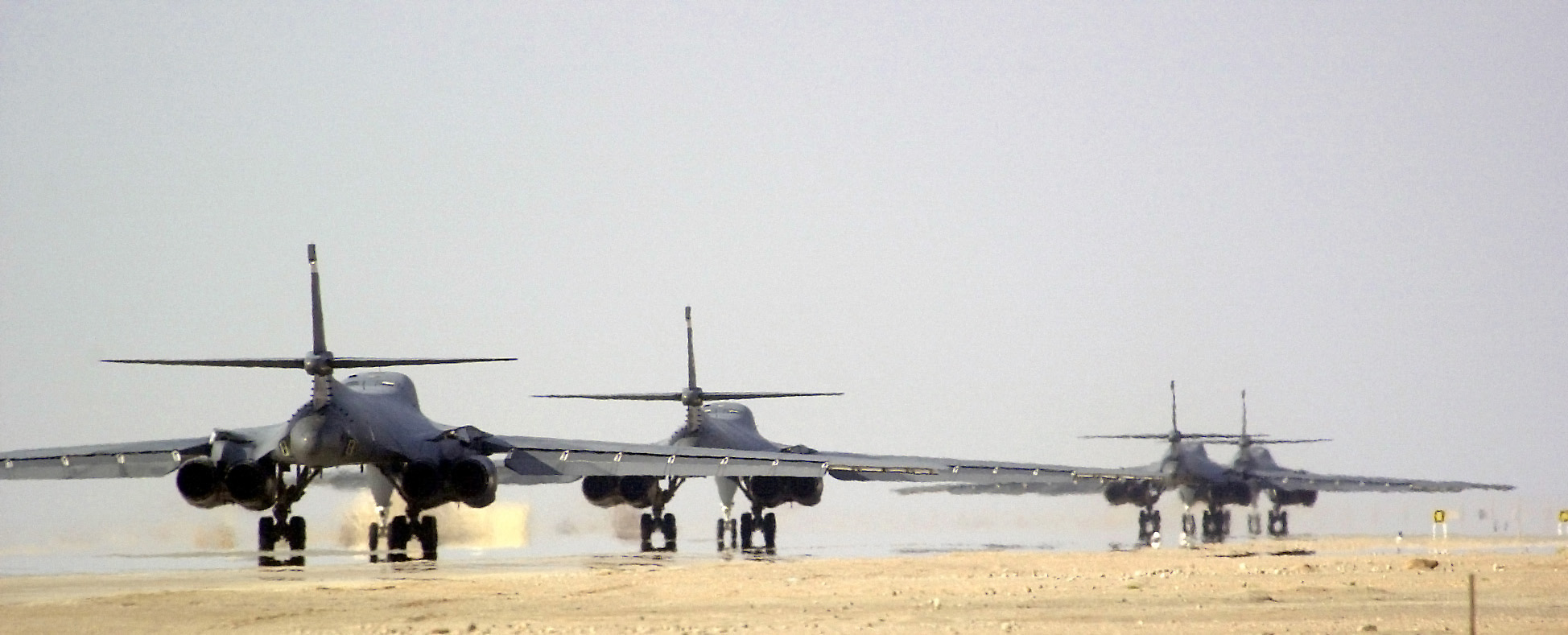
Four B-1s of the 405th AEW taxi to takeoff at Thumrait, 2 January 2002.

- Established as 405th Fighter-Bomber Wing on 15 October 1952

Activated on 1 December 1952
Inactivated on 1 July 1958
Redesignated 405th Fighter Wing on 11 March 1959
Activated on 9 April 1959
Inactivated on 16 September 1974
Redesignated 405th Tactical Training Wing, and activated on 29 August 1979
Inactivated 1 October 1991
Redesignated 405th Air Expeditionary Wing and converted to provisional status in September 2001
Activated at unknown dates

=== Assignments ===
- Ninth Air Force, 1 December 1952
- Tactical Air Command, 16 April 1953
- Ninth Air Force, 1 July 1956
- 836th Air Division, 8 October 1957 – 1 July 1958
- Thirteenth Air Force, 9 April 1959
- 6th Air Division, 1 August 1968
- Thirteenth Air Force, 15 December 1969 – 16 September 1974
- Twelfth Air Force, 29 August 1979 – 1 October 1991
- Air Combat Command to activate or inactivate any time after September 2001

Attached to United States Central Command Air Forces (later United States Air Forces Central)

=== Components ===
- 1st Test Squadron: 30 April 1970 – 16 September 1974
- 8th Bombardment Squadron (later 8th Special Operations Squadron, 8th Fighter Squadron): 18 November 1964 – 15 January 1968
- 13th Bombardment Squadron (later 13th Fighter Squadron): 18 November 1964 – 15 January 1968
- 20th Operations Squadron: 31 December 1971 – 16 September 1974
- 64th Fighter-Interceptor Squadron: 10 June 1966 – 15 December 1969
- 90th Tactical Fighter Squadron: (Attached: 5 December 1965 – 7 May 1966); 15 December 1972 – 16 September 1974
- 425th Tactical Fighter Training Squadron: 29 August 1979 – 30 September 1991
- 426th Tactical Fighter Training Squadron: 1 January 1981 – 29 November 1990
- 461st Tactical Fighter Training Squadron: 29 August 1979 – 30 September 1991
- 508th Fighter-Bomber Squadron: 8 October 1957 – 1 April 1958
- 509th Fighter-Interceptor Squadron: 8 October 1957 – 1 July 1958, 9 April 1959 – 24 July 1970
- 510th Tactical Fighter Squadron: 8 October 1957 – 1 July 1958, 9 April 1959 – 16 March 1964
- 511th Fighter-Bomber Squadron: 8 October 1957 – 1 July 1958
- 523d Tactical Fighter Squadron: 8 October 1957 – 1 July 1958, 20 November 1965 – 31 August 1973
- 550th Tactical Fighter Training Squadron: 29 August 1979 – 30 September 1991
- 555th Tactical Fighter Training Squadron: 29 August 1979 – 30 September 1991
- 774th Tactical Airlift Squadron: 31 December 1971 – 15 September 1972

=== Stations ===
- Godman Air Force Base, Kentucky, 1 December 1952
- Langley Air Force Base, Virginia, 16 April 1953 – 1 July 1958
- Clark Air Base, Philippines, 9 April 1959 – 16 September 1974

Detachment 1 at Tainan Air Base, Taiwan, 1 April 1961 – 31 July 1974

- Luke Air Force Base, Arizona, 29 August 1979 – 1 October 1991
- Southwest Asia, 2001-unknown

=== Aircraft ===
- McDonnel Douglas F-15 Eagle, 1979–1991
- McDonnell Douglas F-15E Strike Eagle, 1988–1991
- Douglas C-9 Nightingale, 1972–1974
- Lockheed C-130 Hercules, 1968–1972
- Martin B-57 Canberra, 1964–1968; 1972–1974
- McDonnell F-4 Phantom II, 1967–1973
- Convair F-102 Delta Dagger, 1960–1970
- North American F-86D Sabre, 1959–1960
- North American F-100 Super Sabre, 1959–1967
- Republic F-47 Thunderbolt, 1952–1954
- Republic F-84F Thunderstreak, 1954–1958
