= 806th Air Division =

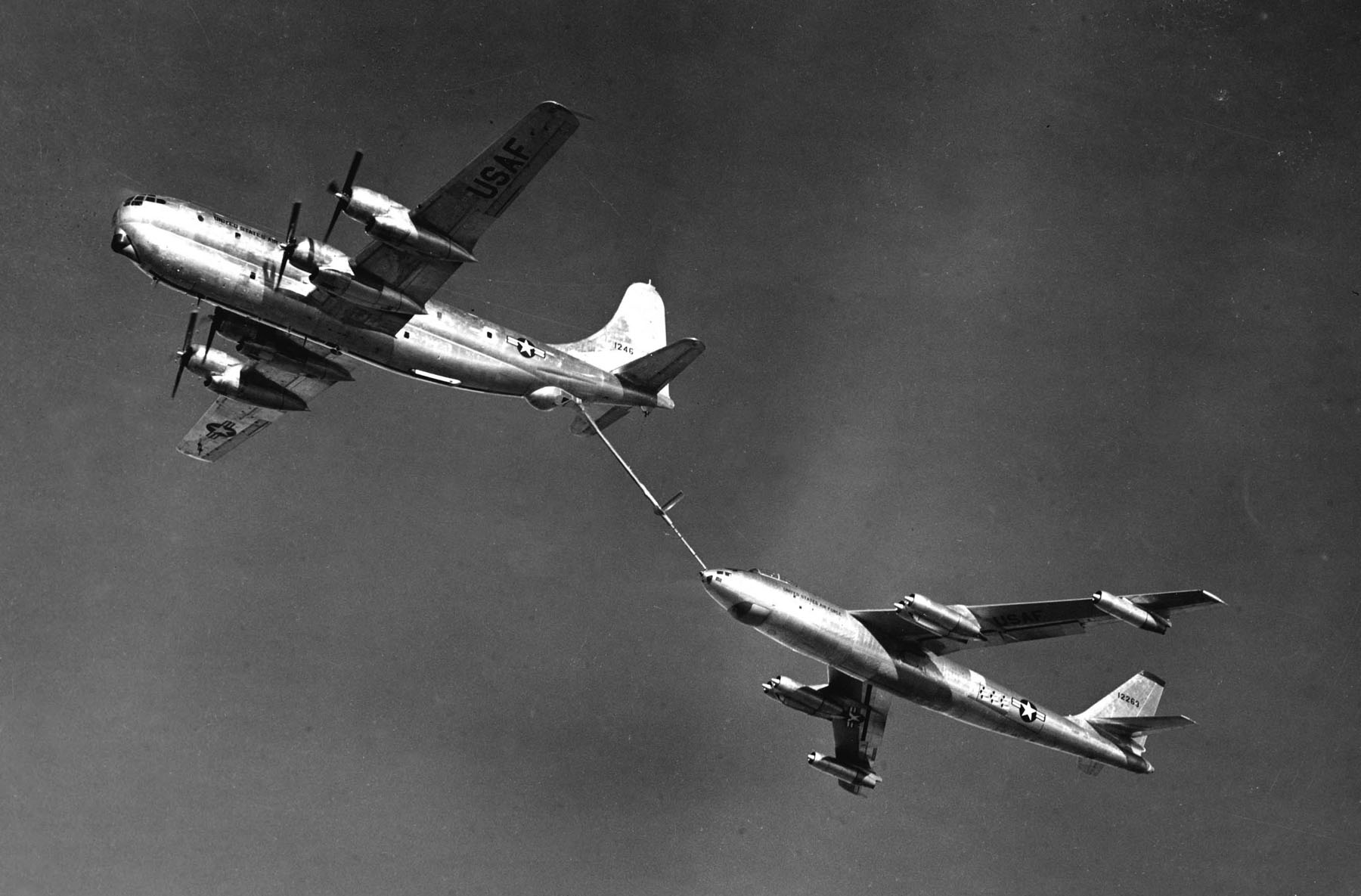
- USAF KC-97F Stratotanker refueling B-47B Stratojet
- Active: 1952–1960
- Country: United States
- Branch: United States Air Force
- Role: Bombardment

Insignia
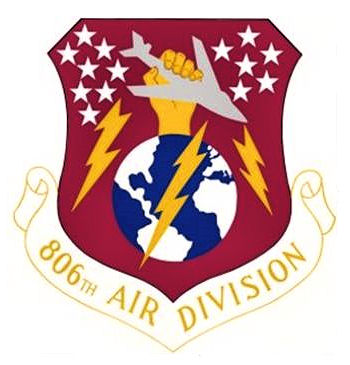
- 806th Air Division emblem (Note: Approved 13 April 1954. Description: Gules, issuing from the top of a globe argent with water areas azure, a left hand or grasping a stylized aircraft silver grey and emitting three lightning bolts to base of the fourth [color mentioned], the center one surmounting the globe, in dexter chief a cluster of eight mullets of the second [color mentioned] and in sinister chief a cluster of six of the like [color].)

The 806th Air Division is an inactive United States Air Force organization. It was assigned to Second Air Force of Strategic Air Command at Chennault Air Force Base, Louisiana. where it was inactivated on 15 June 1960.

The division was activated to manage the two Strategic Air Command medium bombardment wings at Chennault in 1952. Shortly after the division was activated, its mission changed from crew training to strategic bombardment, originally with Boeing B-29 Superfortresses, then with Boeing B-47 Stratojets. It was inactivated with one of its wings, which left Chennault as a single wing base.

== History ==
The 806th Air Division was activated in 1952 at Lake Charles Air Force Base, Louisiana when Strategic Air Command (SAC) departed from the wing base organization system and created air divisions as the headquarters on bases with two operational wings. The division's components were the 44th and 68th Bombardment Wings, and the newly activated 806th Air Base Group. Both its operational wings flew variants of the Boeing B-29 Superfortress. Its 44th Wing served as an Operational Training Unit for B-29 aircrews and maintenance personnel being assigned to Far East Air Forces until late August.

The following year, the division's bombardment units upgraded to the Boeing B-47 Stratojet and expanded to include air refueling squadrons flying Boeing KC-97 Stratofreighters. The 98th Air Refueling Squadron moved to Lake Charles from MacDill Air Force Base, Florida in November 1953 and was assigned to the division. The squadron was inactivated a few days later and its personnel and equipment were transferred to the 68th wing's 68th Air Refueling Squadron. The division monitored and coordinated the units' manning, equipping, and training for global strategic air warfare on a global scale. In fulfilling its mission, the division participated in numerous tactical exercises.

The division's 44th Wing deployed as a unit to 5th Air Division forward locations in Morocco, while the 68th deployed to bases in the United Kingdom controlled by 7th Air Division. The division's tanker units deployed separately to locations including Canada.

On 14 November 1958, Lake Charles Air Force Base was renamed Chennault Air Force Base in honor of General Claire Lee Chennault, the founder of the Flying Tigers, who died in July of that year.

The 806th was inactivated in June 1960 when the 44th Bombardment Wing was inactivated as a first step toward the planned closure of Chennault in 1962. This left only a single wing at Chennault and the 68th Bombardment Wing and its 68th Combat Support Group assumed host base responsibility as the sole remaining wing at Chennault.

== Lineage ==
- Constituted as the 806 Air Division on 4 June 1952

Activated on 16 June 1952
Discontinued on 15 June 1960

=== Assignments ===
- Second Air Force, 16 June 1952 – 15 June 1960.

=== Stations ===
- Lake Charles Air Force Base (later Chennault Air Force Base), Louisiana, 16 June 1952 – 15 June 1960

=== Components ===
Wings

- 44th Bombardment Wing: 16 June 1952 – 15 June 1960 (attached to 5th Air Division 19 January 1953 – 22 February 1953 and 19 April 1954 – 17 June 1954)
- 68th Bombardment Wing: 16 June 1952 – 15 June 1960

Groups

- 806th Air Base Group (later 806th Combat Support Group): 16 June 1952 – 15 June 1960
- 806th Medical Group: 1 December 1958 – 15 June 1960

Squadrons

- 98th Air Refueling Squadron: 22 November 1953 – 25 November 1953
- 505th Aviation Squadron: 18 September 1953 – 1 July 1954

Other

- 4232d USAF Hospital: 1 April 1954 – 1 December 1958 (attached to 806th Air Base Group)

=== Aircraft ===
- Boeing B-29 Superfortress, 1952–1953
- Boeing B-47 Stratojet, 1953–1960
- Boeing KC-97 Stratofreighter, 1953–1960

=== Commanders ===
Col Carlos J. Cochrane, 16 June 1952; Brig Gen Raymond L. Winn, 3 November 1952; Brig Gen Henry K. Mooney, 2 August 1954; Brig Gen John K. Hester, 1 August 1955; Col Jacob J. Brogger, 24 July 1957; Col Robert H. Strauss, 4 December 1958; Col William J. Cain Jr., 27 May – 15 June 1960

== See also ==
- List of United States Air Force air divisions
- List of USAF Bomb Wings and Wings assigned to Strategic Air Command
- List of B-29 units of the United States Air Force
- List of B-47 units of the United States Air Force
