= 98th Expeditionary Air Refueling Squadron =

Inactive US Air Force unit

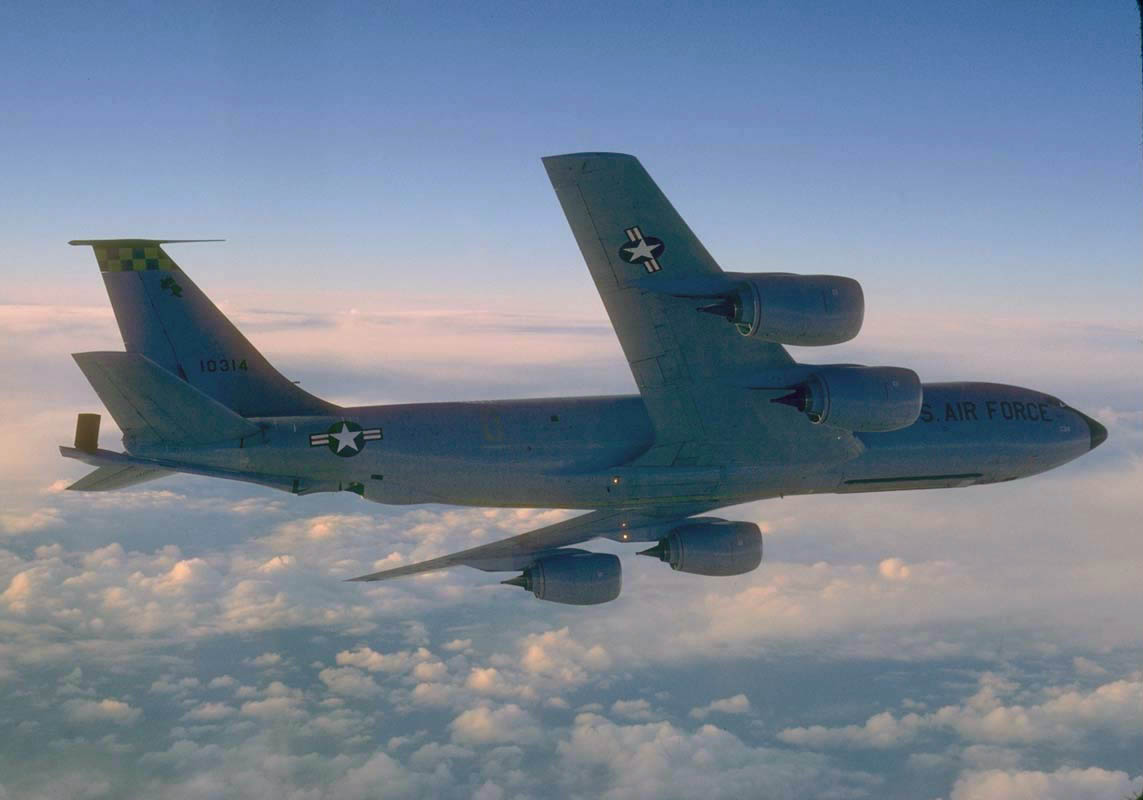
- KC-135 Stratotanker from Fairchild Air Force Base
- Active: 1942–1943; 1944–1946; 1950–1952; 1952–1953; 1954–1963; 1994–1998
- Country: United States
- Branch: United States Air Force
- Role: Air refueling
- Motto: We Change the Range (1955-1963)
- Decorations: Distinguished Unit Citation; Air Force Outstanding Unit Award

Insignia
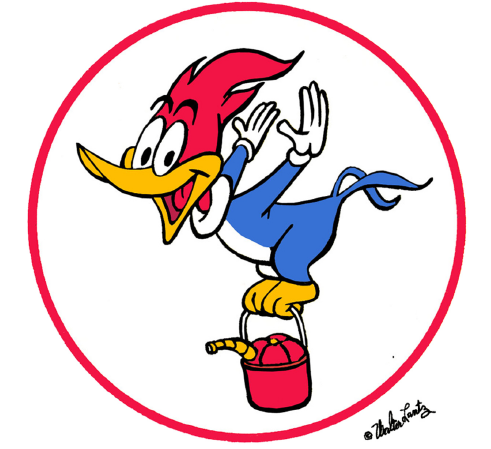
- 98th Air Refueling Squadron emblem (Note: Approved 11 August 1955. Description: On a white disc, edged Red, the character Woody Woodpecker in his natural colors of Red, Light Blue, White, Yellow and Black, flying through the air, and carrying with his feet a Red gasoline container with Yellow, White and Black detail. Endicott, p. 705. The emblem was designed in 1954 by two crew chiefs at Lincoln AFB, although the final design based on their design was made by Walter Lantz Studios.)

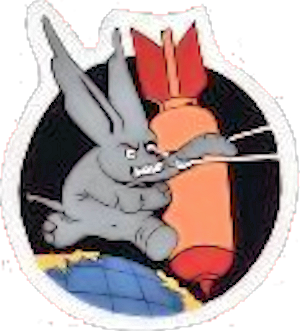
- 398th Bombardment Squadron, Very Heavy emblem (Note: Approved 20 September 1944. Description: Over and through a black disc, a caricatured white elephant with aerial machine guns for tusks, firing, proper, face expressing anger, running and holding with the trunk a very large yellow orange aerial bomb, trimmed red at nose and tail fin, all over a segment of the globe with light blue water area, yellow orange land area, and marked with darker blue lines of latitude and longitude.)

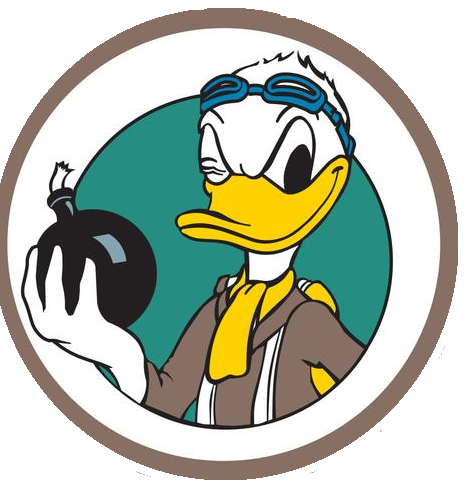
- 398th Bombardment Squadron (Medium) emblem

The 98th Air Refueling Squadron is an inactive United States Air Force unit. Its last assignment was with the 92d Operations Group at Fairchild Air Force Base, Washington, where it was inactivated on 1 July 1998.

Two of the squadron's predecessors were formed during World War II under the name 398th Bombardment Squadron. The first was a medium bomber Operational Training Unit, which was disbanded in 1943, when the Army Air Forces ended Martin B-26 Marauder training at MacDill Field. The second was a very heavy operational unit that participated in the strategic bombing campaign against Japan, earning two Distinguished Unit Citations before inactivating in the Philippines after V-J Day. They were consolidated with the 98th in 1985.

The 98th Air Refueling Squadron was a tanker unit. It was active as part of Strategic Air Command between 1950 and 1963, then served with Air Mobility Commands from 1994 to 1998. It was converted to provisional status as an expeditionary unit in 2002.

== History ==
=== World War II ===
==== Medium bomber operational training unit ====
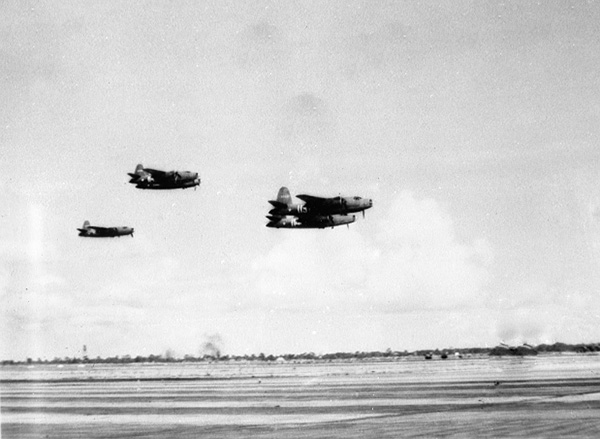
21st Bombardment Group B-26 Marauders at MacDill Field

The squadron's first predecessor was activated at Bowman Field, Kentucky, as the 8th Reconnaissance Squadron in February 1942 and attached to the 21st Bombardment Group. It moved a week later to Jackson Army Air Base, Mississippi, where it began to organize with North American B-25 Mitchells. On 22 April, the squadron was redesignated the 398th Bombardment Squadron (Medium) and its attachment to the 21st Group became an assignment. It moved to Columbia Army Air Base, South Carolina on 24 April. At Columbia, the unit became a medium bomber Operational Training Unit (OTU). The OTU program involved the use of an oversized parent unit to provide cadres to "satellite" units. The program was patterned after the unit training system of the Royal Air Force. The parent assumed responsibility for training the satellite units and oversaw their expansion with graduates of Army Air Forces Training Command schools to become effective combat units. Phase I training concentrated on individual training in crewmember specialties. Phase II training emphasized the coordination for the crew to act as a team. The final phase concentrated on operation as a unit.

On 26 May the 398th Squadron moved to Key Field, Mississippi. The squadron interrupted its training mission on 8 June to fly an antisubmarine warfare mission from Hattiesburg Army Air Field, Mississippi, returning to Key Field a few days later. It moved to MacDill Field, Florida on 26 June 1942. At MacDill, the squadron converted to Martin B-26 Marauders. It again flew antisubmarine missions between 31 July and 8 August 1942. The 398th resumed its OTU mission at MacDill until July 1943, when it began preparing for disbanding on 10 October 1943, as MacDill prepared to transition to Boeing B-17 Flying Fortress training.

==== B-29 Superfortress operations against Japan ====
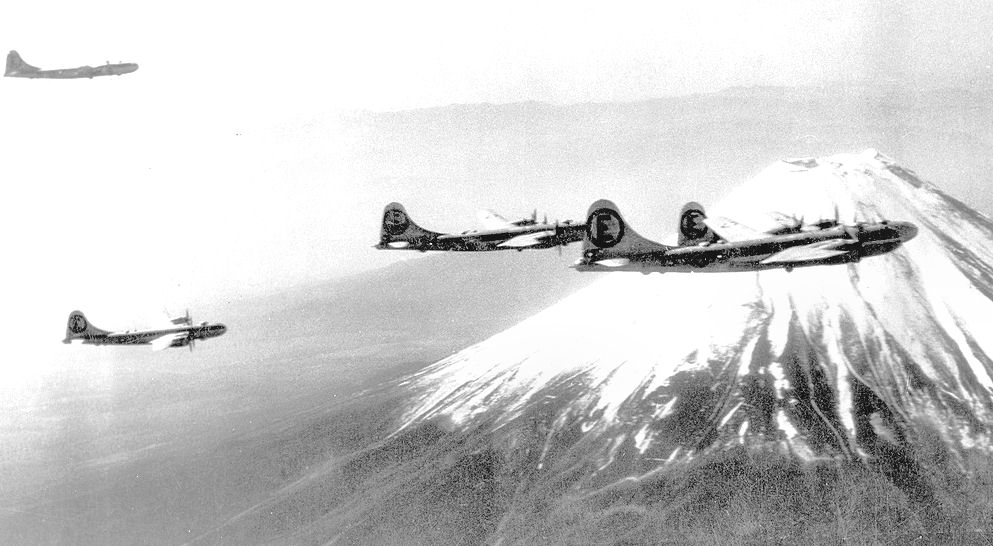
504th Bombardment Group B-29s over Mount Fuji, 1945

The second predecessor of the squadron was activated at Dalhart Army Air Field, Texas on 11 March 1944 and assigned to the 504th Bombardment Group, but it moved to Fairmont Army Air Field, Nebraska the following day to begin training as a Boeing B-29 Superfortress squadron. However, due to a lack of B-29s, the squadron initially equipped with Boeing B-17 Flying Fortresses. The squadron completed training with B-29s and departed for the Pacific Theater on 5 November 1944.

The squadron arrived at its combat station, North Field, Tinian on 23 December, and flew its first combat mission in January 1945. It initially flew missions against Japanese airfields and other installations on Maug, Iwo Jima, and the Truk islands. The squadron flew its first combat mission over Japan on 25 February 1945, when it bombed the industrial area of Kobe. It initially flew high altitude daylight missions, attacking aircraft factories, chemical plants, harbors and arsenals. However, the results of high altitude B-29 raids on Japan were disappointing. After a raid on 19 January, no mission had been able to bomb visually, and radar bombing results were generally unsatisfactory. Low altitude night area attacks with incendiaries promised better results, for XXI Bomber Command. The switch in tactics began in March 1945, when the squadron began to fly low altitude night missions against area targets.

During April and May 1945 the squadron was diverted from the strategic bombing campaign against Japan to support Operation Iceberg, the invasion of Okinawa. It struck air bases from which kamikaze attacks were being launched. Many of these bases were located on Kyushu, only 300 miles from Okinawa. The attacks directly impacted kamikaze launches, but also forced the Japanese military to retain interceptor aircraft to defend the Japanese Special Attack Units that otherwise might have been used to challenge air superiority over Okinawa.

On 28 May, the 398th attacked the industrial center of Yokohama, for which it was awarded a Distinguished Unit Citation (DUC). The squadron had begun mining operations in March, and its conduct of mining missions against Korean shipping routes, harbors on the Inland Sea, and Shimonoseki Strait from late July until V-J Day earned the squadron a second DUC.

Following the Japanese surrender, its B 29s carried relief supplies to Allied prisoners of war, dropping food and other supplies. It flew show of force missions and bomb damage assessment missions over Japan. In March 1946, the squadron moved to Clark Field in the Philippines, where it was inactivated on 15 June 1946.

=== Strategic Air Command air refueling operations ===
On 16 August 1950, the 98th Air Refueling Squadron was activated at Spokane Air Force Base, Washington and assigned to the 98th Bombardment Group. Its parent group deployed to Yokota Air Base, Japan for the Korean War seven days after the squadron was activated, and it was apparently not equipped before it was inactivated on 8 April 1952.

The squadron was activated the same day at MacDill Air Force Base, Florida. Its parent remained in Japan, and it was attached to the 6th Air Division. It received its first Boeing KC-97 Stratofreighters in 1953, and was assigned to the 6th Air Division in July. The squadron moved to Lake Charles Air Force Base, Louisiana on 22 November 1953. It was inactivated three days later, and its personnel and Stratofreighters were used to form the 68th Air Refueling Squadron.

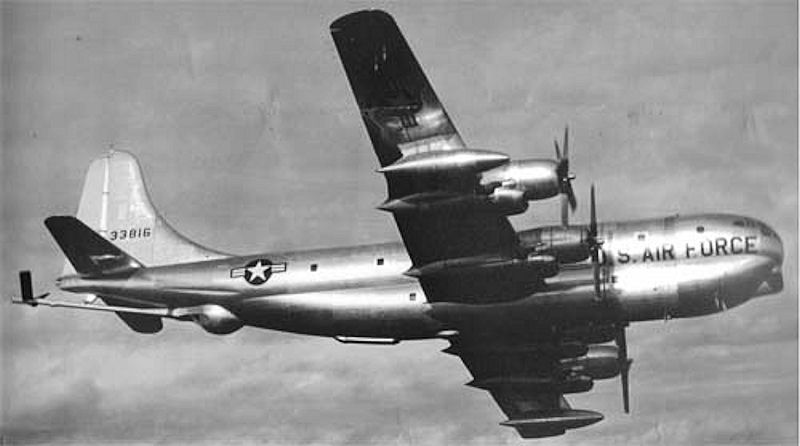
Squadron KC-97G Stratofreighter (Note: Aircraft is KC-97G-29-BO, serial 53-3816. This was the last KC-97 built by Boeing. It was sent to the Military Aircraft Storage and Disposal Center on 17 December 1965, but returned to service with the Air National Guard in 1970 after conversion to KC-97L. Dirkx, Marco (7 June 2025). "1953 USAF Serial Numbers". Joe Baugher’s Serial Number List.)

The squadron was activated at Lincoln Air Force Base, Nebraska in February 1954, in anticipation of the return of the 98th Bombardment Wing from Japan, and began equipping with KC-97Gs, drawing its personnel from the 55th Air Refueling Squadron, which moved from Forbes Air Force Base, Kansas to Lincoln and was inactivated two days later. The 55th had been flying Boeing KB-29 Superfortresses at Forbes, and the squadron began transitioning into the KC-97G. Until the 98th Wing returned from the Far East in the summer of 1954, the squadron was attached to the 98th Air Base Group. From September through November 1954, the runways at Lincoln were lengthened and strengthened to support B-47s and the squadron operated from Forbes.

The squadron made frequent deployments with its KC-97s to forward locations, placing it ahead of the faster Boeing B-47 Stratojets it would refuel, and on their programmed wartime routes. It deployed to Goose Air Base, Labrador from 7 January to 1 February 1955, RAF Mildenhall, England from 7 November 1955 to 31 January 1966, (Note: Although squadron personnel were stationed at Mildenhall for this deployment, its tankers flew from RAF Lakenheath. 98th Air Refueling Squadron History.) Ernest Harmon Air Force Base, Newfoundland from 27 December 1956 to 14 March 1957 and from 28 December 1957 to 15 March 1958, and to Lajes Air Base, Azores from 1 April to 8 July 1959. During its first deployment to Ernest Harmon, the squadron supported Operation Power Flite, the non-stop flight of Boeing B-52 Stratofortresses around the world. During the Lebanon Crisis of 1958, SAC placed the entire squadron on alert.

Starting in 1958, the squadron began to assume an alert posture at Lincoln, reducing the amount of time spent on alert at overseas bases to meet General Thomas S. Power’s initial goal of maintaining one third of SAC's planes on fifteen minute ground alert, fully fueled and ready for combat to reduce vulnerability to a Soviet missile strike.

When Soviet missiles were detected in Cuba, the squadron was forward deployed to Lajes Air Base. Strategic Air Command (SAC) ordered all degraded and adjusted alert sorties to be brought up to full capability. In addition, the squadron was tasked to fly reconnaissance missions over the mid-Atlantic, searching for vessels that might be transporting additional missiles to Cuba. On 29 October additional KC-97s were dispersed to Lajes to provide refueling for B-47s on increased alert status.. On 21 November SAC went to DEFCON 3. Although dispersed tankers were recalled on 24 November and on 27 November SAC returned to normal alert posture, the squadron remained at Lajes until 1963, when it returned to Lincoln. At Lincoln, the squadron began transferring its personnel and planes to other units, flying its last mission on 29 March 1963. The squadron was inactivated on 15 April 1963.

=== Air Mobility Command operations ===
In September 1985 the 98th was consolidated with the two 398th Bombardment Squadrons. It was activated on 1 April 1994 at Fairchild Air Force Base, flying Boeing KC-135T Stratotanker aircraft and assigned to the 453rd Operations Group of Air Mobility Command (AMC). In July 1994, the 92d Bombardment Wing transferred from SAC to AMC and became the 92nd Air Refueling Wing, while the squadron became part of its 92nd Operations Group. The squadron was inactivated in 1998 as the Air Force drew down after the end of the Cold War.

In 2002 the squadron was converted to provisional status and redesignated the 98th Expeditionary Air Refueling Squadron and assigned to AMC to activate or inactivate as needed. The following year, its assignment was changed to Air Combat Command.

=== Awards and campaigns ===
Award streamer	Award	Dates	Notes
	Distinguished Unit Citation	28 May 1945	Yokohama, Japan 398th Bombardment Squadron
	Distinguished Unit Citation	27 July 1945–14 August 1945	Japan and Korea 398th Bombardment Squadron

Campaign Streamer	Campaign	Dates	Notes
	Antisubmarine	8 June 1942, 31 July 1942–8 August 1942	398th Bombardment Squadron
	Air Offensive, Japan	23 December 1944–2 September 1945	398th Bombardment Squadron
	Western Pacific	17 April 1945–2 September 1945	398th Bombardment Squadron
	Eastern Mandates	23 December 1944–January 1945	398th Bombardment Squadron (Note: Award given for actual combat after campaign termination date. Maurer, Combat Squadrons, p. 802 (note).)

== Lineage ==
398th Bombardment Squadron (Medium)

- Constituted as the 8th Reconnaissance Squadron (Medium) on 13 January 1942

Activated on 1 February 1942
Redesignated 398th Bombardment Squadron (Medium) on 22 April 1942
Disbanded on 10 October 1943

- Consolidated on 19 September 1985 with the 398th Bombardment Squadron, Very Heavy and the 98th Air Refueling Squadron as the 98th Air Refueling Squadron

398th Bombardment Squadron, Very Heavy

- Constituted as the 398th Bombardment Squadron, Very Heavy on 28 February 1944

Activated on 11 March 1944
Inactivated on 15 June 1946

- Consolidated on 19 September 1985 with the 398th Bombardment Squadron, Very Heavy and the 98th Air Refueling Squadron as the 98th Air Refueling Squadron

98th Air Refueling Squadron

- Constituted as the 98th Air Refueling Squadron, Medium on 1 August 1950

Activated on 16 August 1950
Inactivated on 8 April 1952

- Activated on 8 April 1952

Inactivated on 25 November 1953

- Activated on 18 February 1954

Inactivated on 15 April 1963

- Consolidated on 19 September 1985 with the 398th Bombardment Squadron (Medium) and the 398th Bombardment Squadron, Very Heavy
- Redesignated 98th Air Refueling Squadron, Heavy on 19 September 1986 (remained inactive)
- Redesignated 98th Air Refueling Squadron on 1 April 1994 and activated

Inactivated on 30 September 1998

- Redesignated 98th Expeditionary Air Refueling Squadron and converted to provisional status on 12 June 2002

=== Assignments ===
- Air Force Combat Command, 1 February 1942, (attached to 21st Bombardment Group)
- 21st Bombardment Group, 22 April 1942 – 10 October 1943
- 504th Bombardment Group, 11 March 1944 – 15 June 1946
- 98th Bombardment Group, 16 August 1950 – 8 April 1952 (attached to 98th Bombardment Wing after 14 February 1951)
- 98th Bombardment Group, 8 April 1952 (attached to 6th Air Division)
- 98th Bombardment Wing, 16 June 1952 (attached to 6th Air Division)
- 6th Air Division, 1 July 1953
- 806th Air Division, 22 November 1953 – 25 November 1953
- 98th Bombardment Wing, 18 February 1954 – 15 April 1963 (attached to 98th Air Base Group until 1 August 1954, unknown 7 January – 1 February 1955, Ernest Harmon Task Force, 27 December 1956 – 14 March 1957, 28 December 1957 – 15 March 1958, Lajes Tanker Task Force, 1 April – 8 July 1959, 2 October 1962 – 7 January 1963)
- 453rd Operations Group, 1 April 1994
- 92nd Operations Group, 1 July 1994 – 30 September 1998
- Air Mobility Command to activate or inactivate as needed after 12 June 2002
- Air Combat Command to activate or inactivate as needed, 19 March 2003

=== Stations ===
- Bowman Field, Kentucky, 1 February 1942
- Jackson Army Air Base, Mississippi, 8 February 1942
- Columbia Army Air Base, South Carolina, 24 April 1942
- Key Field, Mississippi, 26 May 1942
- MacDill Field, Florida, 28 June 1942 – 10 October 1943
- Dalhart Army Air Field, Texas, 11 March 1944
- Fairmont Army Air Field, Nebraska, 12 March – 5 November 1944
- North Field, Tinian, 23 December 1944
- Clark Field, Luzon, Philippines, 13 March – 15 June 1946
- Spokane Air Force Base (later Fairchild Air Force Base, Washington, 16 August 1950 – 8 April 1952
- MacDill Air Force Base, Florida, 8 April 1952
- Lake Charles Air Force Base, Louisiana, 22 November 1953 – 25 November 1953
- Lincoln Air Force Base, Nebraska, 16 April 1954 – 15 April 1963 (deployed to Goose Air Base, Labrador 7 January – 1 February 1955, RAF Mildenhall, England, 7 November 1955 – 31 January 1966, Ernest Harmon Air Force Base, 27 December 1956 – 14 March 1957, 28 December 1957 – 15 March 1958, Lajes Air Base, 1 April – 8 July 1959, 2 October 1962 – 7 January 1963)
- Fairchild Air Force Base, Washington, 19 September 1986 – 30 September 1998

=== Aircraft ===
- North American B-25 Mitchell, 1942
- Martin B-26 Marauder, 1942–1943
- Boeing B-17 Flying Fortress, 1944
- Boeing B-29 Superfortress, 1944–1946
- Boeing KC-97 Stratofreighter, 1952–1960
- Boeing KC-135 Stratotanker, 1960–1963; 1986–1998

== See also ==
- List of United States Air Force air refueling squadrons
- List of B-29 Superfortress operators
- List of Martin B-26 Marauder operators
