= 6th Air Division (United States) =

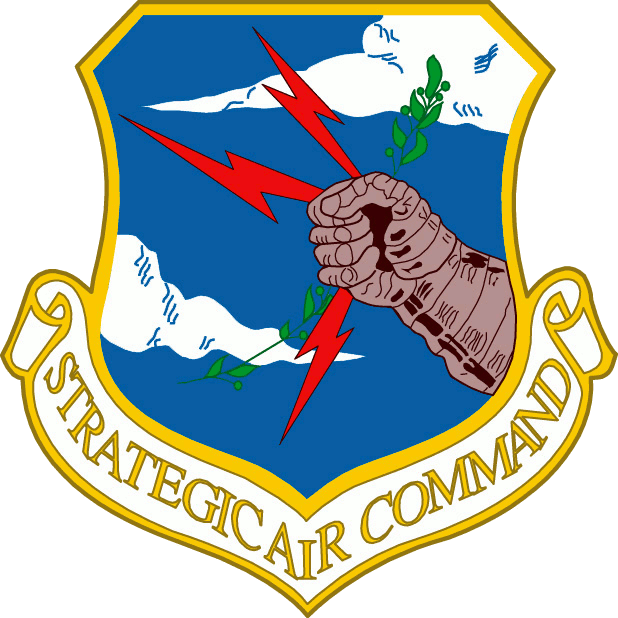
6th Air Division
- Active: 1940–1941; 1942–1943; 1946–1948; 1951–1966; 1968–1969
- Country: United States
- Branch: United States Air Force
- Equipment: see Aircraft

Insignia
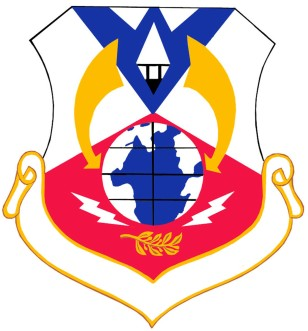
- 6th Air Division emblem (approved 5 October 1955)

The 6th Air Division is an inactive United States Air Force unit. Its last assignment was with the Thirteenth Air Force, based at Clark Air Base, Philippines. It was inactivated on 15 December 1969.

== Heraldry ==
On a shield per chevron argent and gules, in chief, a stylized silhouetted jet aircraft, issuing from chief, nose toward base azure; in base a sphere with land areas of the first and water areas of the third, grid lines black, over a branch of olive or, between two lightning bolts argent; superimposed overall and flanking the dexter and sinister, two stylized arrows or. (Approved 5 October 1955)

== History ==
Established as a pursuit wing in 1940, under Northeast Air District (later First Air Force). Deployed to the European Theater of Operations in the summer of 1942, the 6th Fighter Wing was a training organization for VIII Fighter Command in England during 1942/43 where it trained replacement pilots for fighter organizations. After the war, it served in the Canal Zone as part of the defense forces of the Panama Canal

Being redesignated as an Air Division in 1951, the 6th Air Division was an intermediate command echelon of Strategic Air Command, performing, organizing, and training assigned units for sustained long–range offensive bombardment and air-to-air refueling operations around the world.

Inactivated by SAC with the closure of Dow Air Force Base in 1966, the unit was reactivated under Thirteenth Air Force in the Philippines as a theater transport command and control organization, supporting US forces in the Vietnam War. Units under the division's control participated in Arc Light missions and controlled aircraft that flew weather reconnaissance missions in Southeast Asia.

Inactivated in 1969 due to budget restraints.

=== Lineage ===
- Established as the 6th Pursuit Wing on 19 October 1940

Activated on 18 December 1940
Inactivated on 7 December 1941

- Redesignated 6th Fighter Wing on 30 May 1942

Activated on 7 June 1942
Disestablished on 13 September 1943

- Reestablished on 5 August 1946

Activated on 25 August 1946
Inactivated on 28 July 1948

- Redesignated 6th Air Division on 1 February 1951

Organized on 10 February 1951
Discontinued on 16 June 1952

- Activated on 16 June 1952

Discontinued and inactivated on 2 July 1966

- Activated on 5 July 1968

Organized on 1 August 1968
Inactivated on 15 December 1969

=== Assignments ===
- GHQ Air Force, 18 December 1940 – 7 December 1941

Apparently further assigned to: Northeast Air District, later 1st Air Force, 16 January 1941
Apparently further assigned to: I Interceptor Command, 5 June – 7 December 1941

- VIII Fighter Command, 7 June 1942 – 13 September 1943 (attached to I Fighter Command until c. 5 August 1942)
- Caribbean Air Command, 25 August 1946 – 28 July 1948
- Second Air Force, 10 February 1951 – 16 June 1952
- Second Air Force, 16 June 1952
- Eighth Air Force, 1 January 1959 – 2 July 1966
- Pacific Air Forces, 5 July 1968 (not organized)
- Thirteenth Air Force, 1 August 1968 – 15 December 1969

=== Components ===
Wings

- 2d Bombardment Wing: 1 November 1959 – 1 April 1961
- 17th Bombardment Wing: 1 July 1963 – 1 July 1965
- 36th Fighter Wing: attached 2–28 July 1948
- 305th Bombardment Wing: 10 February 1951 – 1 June 1959

Detached 4 September – 5 December 1953, 3 November 1955 – 8 January 1956, and 7 January – 8 March 1957

- 306th Bombardment Wing: 10 February 1951 – 6 February 1961

Detached 11 June – 7 September 1953, 5 January – 21 February 1955, 23 October 1956 – 9 January 1957 and 9–15 October 1957

- 307th Bombardment Wing: 10 February 1951 – 11 October 1954 (detached entire period)
- 321st Bombardment Wing: 1 January – 1 February 1959; 1 July 1959 – 6 February 1961
- 397th Bombardment Wing: 1 February 1963 – 2 July 1966
- 405th Fighter Wing: 1 August 1968 – 15 December 1969
- 416th Bombardment Wing: 1 February 1963 – 2 July 1966
- 463d Tactical Airlift Wing: 1 November 1968 – 15 December 1969
- 4038th Strategic Wing: 1 April 1961 – 1 February 1963
- 4039th Strategic Wing: 1 April 1961 – 1 February 1963

Groups

- 1st Pursuit Group: 3 December 1940 – 4 September 1941
- 31st Pursuit Group: 16 January – 1 October 1941
- 36th Fighter Group: 15 October 1946-c. 13 August 1948
- 52d Pursuit Group: 16 January – 1 October 1941

Squadrons

- 1st Test Squadron: 15 October – 15 December 1969
- 4th Tactical Reconnaissance Squadron: 1 June – 26 July 1948
- 71st Air Refueling Squadron, 1 February 1956 – 1 February 1963
- 20th Operations Squadron: 15 October – 15 December 1969
- 24th Fighter Squadron, 25 August – 15 October 1946
- 28th Fighter Squadron: 25 August – 15 October 1946
- 30th Fighter Squadron: 25 August – 15 October 1946
- 32d Fighter Squadron: 25 August – 15 October 1946
- 43d Fighter Squadron: 25 August – 15 October 1946
- 51st Fighter Squadron: 25 August – 15 October 1946
- 98th Air Refueling Squadron: 1 July – 22 November 1953
- 319th Fighter Squadron: 1 June – 26 July 1948

341st Air Refueling Squadron: 1 April 1961 – 1 February 1963

- 414th Night Fighter Squadron: 24 March – 1 September 1947
- 6400th Test Squadron: 1 August 1968 – 15 October 1969
- 6485th Operations Squadron: 1 December 1968 – 15 October 1969

=== Stations ===
- Selfridge Field, Michigan, 18 December 1940 – 7 December 1941
- Olmsted Field, Pennsylvania, 7 June-c. 4 August 1942
- RAF Bushey Hall (AAF-341), England, c. 16 August 1942
- RAF Atcham (AAF-342), England, c. 24 August 1942 – 13 September 1943
- Howard Field, Panama Canal Zone, 25 August 1946 – 28 July 1948
- MacDill Air Force Base, Florida, 10 February 1951
- Dow Air Force Base, Maine, 1 April 1961 – 2 July 1966
- Clark Air Base, Philippines, 1 August 1968 – 15 December 1969

=== Aircraft ===
- P-39 Airacobra, 1940–1941;
- P-40 Warhawk, 1941.
- P-38 Lightning, 1946;
- P-39 Airacobra, 1946;
- P-47 Thunderbolt, 1946–1948;
- F-80 Shooting Star, 1946–1948;
- P-51 Mustang, 1947;
- P-61 Black Widow, 1947–1948;
- F-6 Skyray, 1948;
- FP-80 Shooting Star, 1948;
- F-82 Twin Mustang, 1948.
- B-29 Superfortress, 1951–1952
- B-47 Stratojet, 1951–1952
- B-50 Superfortress, 1951;
- KC-97 Stratofreighter, 1951–1952.
- B-29 Superfortress, 1952–1954;
- B-47 Stratojet, 1952–1961;
- KC-97 Stratofreighter, 1952–1961, 1963–1964;
- RB-47 Stratojet, 1958;
- C-124 Globemaster II, 1959–1961;
- KC-135 Stratotanker, 1959, 1963–1966;
- B-52 Stratofortress, 1963–1966.
- B-57 Canberra, 1968;
- C-130 Hercules, 1968–1969;
- F-4 Phantom II, 1968–1969;
- F-102 Delta Dagger, 1968–1969

== See also ==
- List of United States Air Force air divisions
