= XXII Bomber Command =

- Active: 1944-1945
- Country: United States
- Branch: United States Air Force
- Role: Command of heavy bomber training units

The XXII Bomber Command was a United States Army Air Forces unit. It was assigned to Second Air Force at Peterson Field, Colorado. It was inactivated on 13 February 1945.

Began organization for second B-29 Superfortress command in Pacific under Second Air Force. Wings attached but never permanently assigned. Organization never got beyond forming Headquarters echelon and Headquarters squadron. Inactivated before any operational groups assigned, as XX Bomber Command units were reassigned from India to the Marianas, eliminating need for command.

== Lineage ==
- Constituted as the XXII Bomber Command (Very Heavy) on 4 August 1944

Activated on 14 August 1944
Disbanded on 13 February 1945

== Assignments ==
- Second Air Force, 14 August 1944 – 13 February 1945 (Attached to 17th Bombardment Operational Training Wing)

== Stations ==
- Peterson Field, Colorado, 14 August 1944 – 13 February 1945

== Components ==
- 315th Bombardment Wing, Very Heavy (Attached), c. 14 August-c. 7 December 1944
- 316th Bombardment Wing, Very Heavy (Attached), c. 14 August-c. 7 December 1944
