= 312th Fighter Wing =

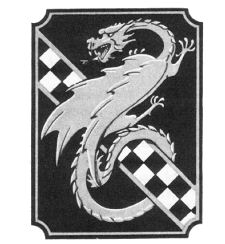
- Emblem of the 312th Fighter Wing
- Active: 1944–1945
- Country: United States
- Branch: United States Army Air Forces
- Role: Fighter
- Part of: Fourteenth Air Force
- Garrison/HQ: China Burma India Theater of World War II
- Engagements: World War II: Asiatic-Pacific Campaign (1944–1945)

The 312th Fighter Wing was a United States Army Air Forces organization. It was a command and control organization of Fourteenth Air Force that fought in the China Burma India Theater of World War II.

== History ==
=== Lineage ===
Constituted as 312th Fighter Wing on 7 March 1944.

Activated in China on 13 March.
Inactivated on 5 November 1945.

=== Assignments ===
- Fourteenth Air Force, 13 March 1944 – 1 October 1945.
- Army Service Forces, 3–5 November 1945.

=== Stations ===
- Kunming Airport, China, 13 March 1944.
- Chengtu Airfield, China, c. 25 March 1944 – c. 1 October 1945.
- Camp Kilmer, New Jersey, United States, c. 3–5 November 1945.

=== Major components ===
- 33d Fighter Group, 11 May – 24 August 1944 (P-38, P-47).
- 81st Fighter Group, 12 May – 1 October 1945 (P-40, P-47).
- 311th Fighter Group, 18 August 1944 – 1 October 1945 (P-51).

=== Operations history ===
Activated in China on 13 March 1944. Assigned to Fourteenth Air Force. Commanded and controlled assigned units in combat in China from July 1944 until August 1945. Moved to the US, October–November 1945 and was inactivated.
