= 602d Training Group =

The 602d Training Group (Provisional) is a training group of the United States Air Force, established in 2007. It is headquartered at Keesler Air Force Base, MS.

The group is responsible for ensuring U.S. Air Force personnel who are tasked with joint expeditionary deployments have the skills necessary to operate in a hostile environment. These Airman are embedded with Army, Marine Corps and Navy units.

"Our mission in the 602nd TRG (Provisional) is to provide capable and confident Airmen to combatant commands," said Chief Master Sgt. Heather Ransom, 602nd TRG (Provisional) superintendent. "We facilitate Army Combat Skills Training, Air Force Evasion and Conduct After Capture and 12 specialty training courses for Airmen filling joint expeditionary and individual augmentee taskings."

The group has detachments at Fort Bliss and Fort Johnson. "Training at Fort Bliss consists of two major focus areas.. The first is our civil engineer training composed of units deploying to perform airfield maintenance and other engineering tasks downrange. The second is individual augmentee training composed of Air Force and Navy personnel who perform varied missions when joint service units have a need for troops." The Combat Advisor Course takes place at Fort Johnson, where Airmen learn to serve as advisors through completion of the Army’s Security Force Assistance training program.

The group provides a 24-hour, seven day a week link for Airmen in training. The group is responsible for all trainee logistics, reception, bed down, care and feeding and redeployment of more than 1,300 students annually.
