= Chengdu Fenghuangshan Airport =

Military air base in Chengdu, China

Chengdu Fenghuangshan Airport
- Sichuan Province, China

Site information
- Type: Military
- Controlled by: Fourteenth Air Force - 1944 to 1945; Republic of China Air Force - 1931 to 1949; People's Liberation Army Air Force - 1949 to present
- Condition: In service

Location
- Location within China

Site history
- Battles/wars: China Defensive Campaign 1942-1945

Garrison information
- Garrison: Western Theater Command Air Force

Chengdu Fenghuangshan Airport (Chinese: 成都凤凰山机场) is a People's Liberation Army Air Force airbase in Chengdu, Sichuan province, China. During World War II it was a United States Army Air Forces airfield. It is located approximately 10 miles south of Chengdu.

== History ==
Fenghuangshan Airport, also known as Chungsing Chang, Fenghwangshan and Makiashipen was built under the directives of Sichuan warlord Liu Xiang in 1931 for his fledgling air force operations, and was integrated into the centralized operations of the Chinese Nationalist Air Force as the War of Resistance-World War II was starting with the invasion and occupation by the Empire of Japan; Fenghuangshan served as an operations base for Chinese fighter squadrons during the terror bombings of Chengdu and Chongqing, and was regularly under bombing attack by Japanese. Fenghuangshan was also the base where Captain Xu Huansheng and his B-10 bomber crews initially trained for the planned transoceanic strategic bombing mission against the Empire of Japan in 1938. Years later, after the United States became involved in World War II, it was a major command and control base for Tenth Air Force, being the home of the 312th Fighter Wing from July 1944 until August 1945. The wing commanded three fighter groups (33rd, 81st and 311th) in central China as well as provided support to Twentieth Air Force B-29 Superfortress groups which staged strategic bombardment missions over Japan though bases in the Chengdu area from their home bases in India (see: Operation Matterhorn).

Also, the 426th Night Fighter Squadron operated P-61 Black Widow night interceptor aircraft from the airfield, providing a night defense against Japanese fighter and bomber raids at night in the area, along with the B-29 bases before their move to the Marianas.

At 2:00 p.m. on December 10, 1949, Chiang Kai-shek and his son Chiang Ching-kuo took off from Chengdu Fenghuangshan Airport on an airplane and arrived at Taipei Songshan Airport in Taiwan at 6:30 a.m. They never returned to mainland China again.

During the 2013 Lushan earthquake in Sichuan, the airport was used as a major air hub for the relief effort and medical evacuation.
