= Lete Airfield =

World War II military airfield in Libya

Site information
- Type: Military airfield

Location
- Coordinates: 32°05′59.97″N 020°10′38.16″E

Site history
- Built: 1943
- In use: 1943

Location of Lete Airfield, Libya

Lete Airfield is an abandoned World War II military airfield located in the vicinity of Al Jukhkh al Kabir; about 10 km east of Benghazi. Its precise location is undetermined, likely redeveloped as part of the suburbs of Benghazi.

It was used by the United States Army Air Force Ninth Air Force during the Eastern Desert Campaign by the British Eighth Army by the 343rd Bombardment Squadron (98th Bombardment Group) from 3 March-25 September 1943, B-24 Liberator and the 344th Bombardment Squadron (98th Bombardment Group), from 4 March-24 September 1943, B-24 Liberator.
