= 343rd Bomb Squadron =

US Air Force Reserve unit

343d Bomb Squadron

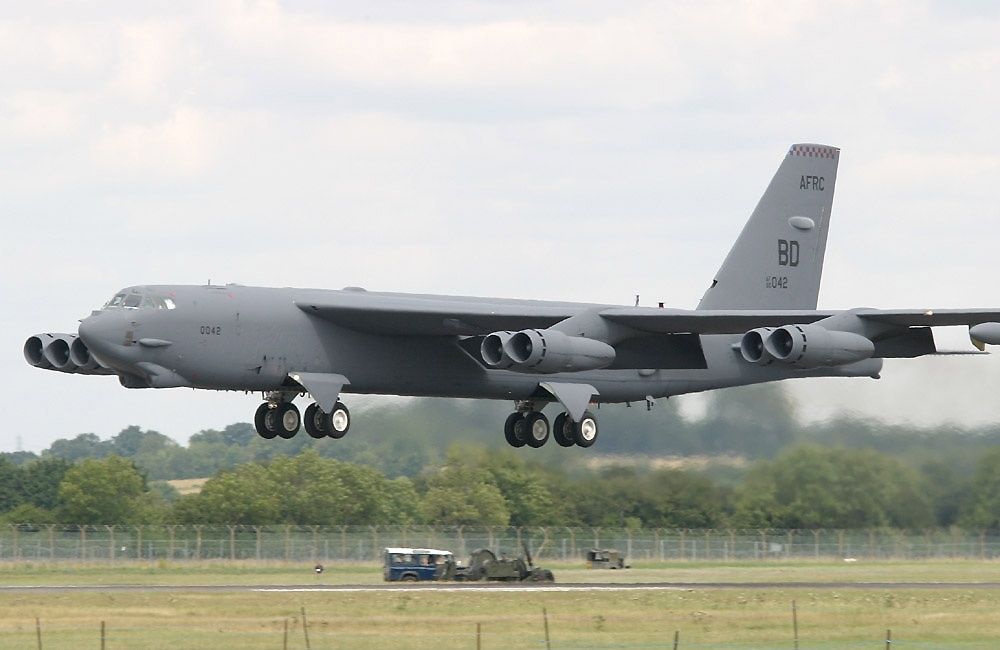
- Squadron B-52H Stratofortress landing at RAF Fairford (Note: Aircraft is Boeing B-52H-150-BW Stratofortress, serial 60-0042 of the 307th Bomb Wing.)
- Active: 1942–1946; 1947–1966; 2010–present
- Country: United States
- Branch: United States Air Force
- Role: Bombardment
- Part of: Air Force Reserve Command
- Nickname: Avengers
- Motto: Heed the Avengers (1957–1966)
- Engagements: Mediterranean Theater of Operations
- Decorations: Distinguished Unit Citation; Air Force Outstanding Unit Award; Republic of Korea Presidential Unit Citation

Insignia
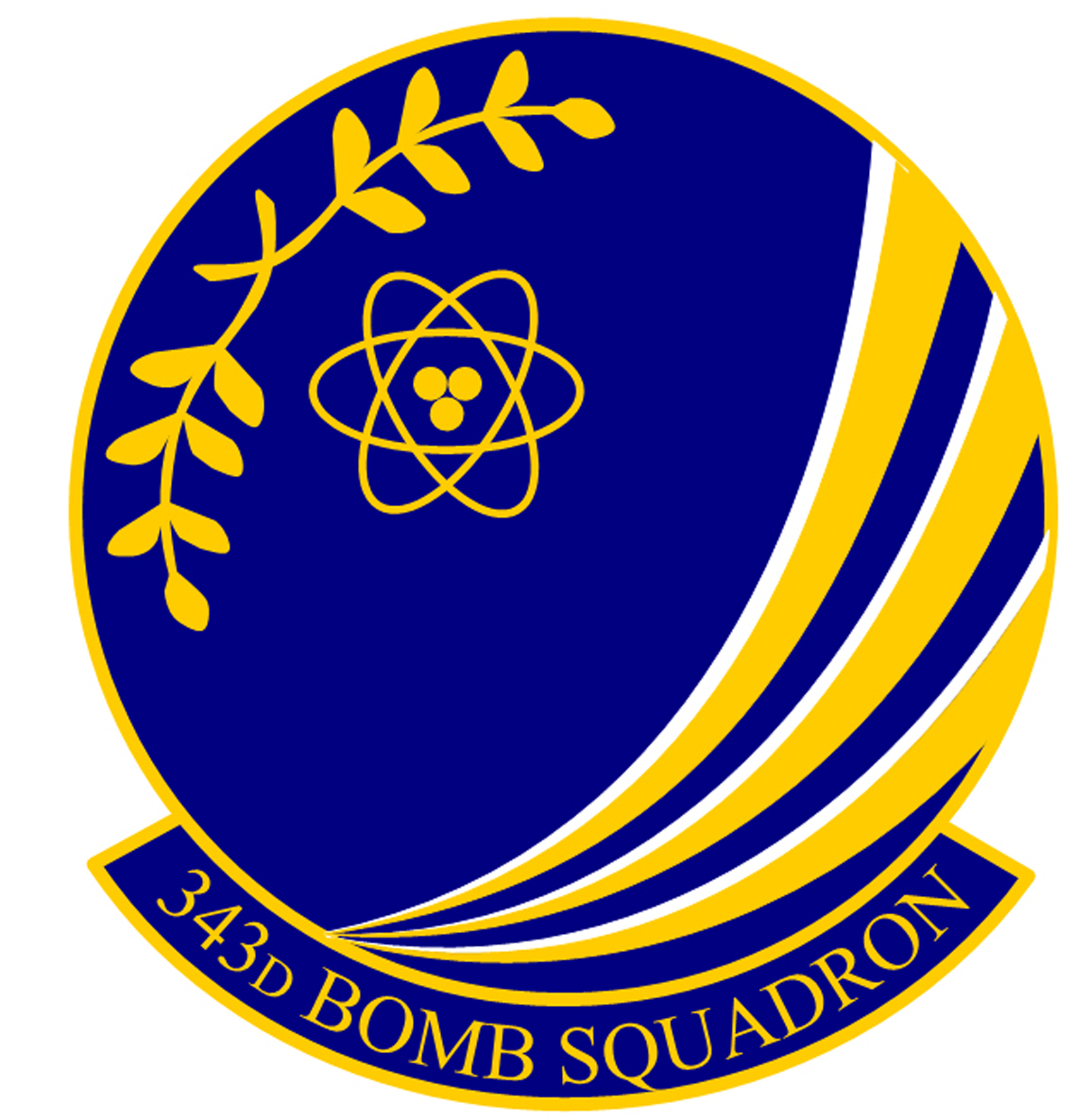
- 343 Bomb Sq emblem

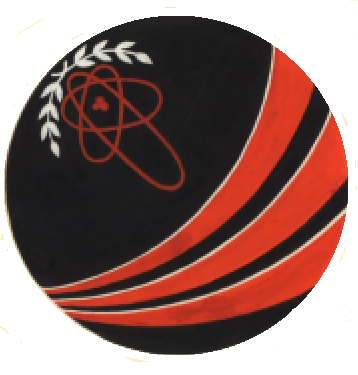
- 343d Bombardment Squadron emblem (Note: Approved 15 April 1957. Description: A black disc, over the left (sinister) area of the disc, three curved golden orange bands, highlighted white; in the upper right (dexter) area of the disc, an atomic symbol of the second [mentioned color], and two silhouetted branches of olive white.)

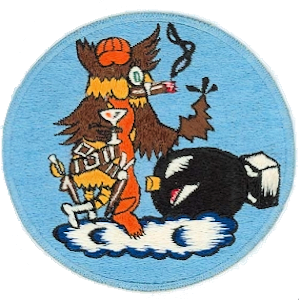
- 343d Bombardment Squadron emblem (World War II)

The 343d Bomb Squadron is a United States Air Force Reserve squadron, assigned to the 307th Operations Group. It is stationed at Barksdale Air Force Base, Louisiana.

The squadron was first activated during World War II as the 343d Bombardment Squadron. It saw combat in the Mediterranean Theater of Operations, participating in Operation Tidal Wave, the low level attack on oil refineries near Ploiești, Romania. It earned two Distinguished Unit Citation (DUC)s for its combat operations. After VE Day the squadron returned to the United States and trained with Boeing B-29 Superfortresses until inactivating in spring 1946.

The squadron was reactivated in 1947 with Superfortresses. During the Korean War, it was deployed to Japan and earned another DUC for its combat operations. The squadron returned to the United States and converted to the Boeing B-47 Stratojet, which it flew until inactivating in 1966 when the B-47 was withdrawn from service and Lincoln Air Force Base closed. It was activated in the reserve in 2010 as a Boeing B-52H Stratofortress squadron.

== Mission ==
The 343rd Bomb Squadron performs the nuclear enterprise and global strike missions in classic association with the 2nd Operations Group. It is the only nuclear-certified bomb squadron in Air Force Reserve Command with the Boeing B-52 Stratofortress.

== History ==
=== World War II ===
==== Training in the United States ====
The squadron was first activated at MacDill Field, Florida as one of the original four squadrons assigned to the 98th Bombardment Group. The 343d soon moved to Barksdale Field, Louisiana, where it began to train as a Consolidated B-24 Liberator heavy bomber squadron under Third Air Force.

The squadron's training was short and it deployed to Egypt in July 1942 over the South Atlantic Ferrying Route transiting from Morrison Field, Florida though the Caribbean Sea to Brazil. It made the Atlantic crossing from Brazil to Liberia, then transited east across central Africa to Sudan. The air echelon of the group reformed with the ground echelon which traveled by the SS Pasteur around the Cape of Good Hope, joining with the air echelon of the squadron, the 344th Bombardment Squadron and group headquarters at St Jean d'Acre Airfield, in Palestine.

==== Combat in the Middle East ====
Upon arrival in the Near East, the squadron became part of United States Army Middle East Air Force, which was replaced by Ninth Air Force in November. It entered combat in August, attacking shipping and harbor installations to cut Axis supply lines to North Africa. It also bombed airfields and rail transit lines in Sicily and mainland Italy. The squadron moved forward with Ninth Air Force to airfields in Egypt; Libya and Tunisia supporting the British Eighth Army in the Western Desert Campaign. Its support of this campaign earned the squadron the Distinguished Unit Citation.

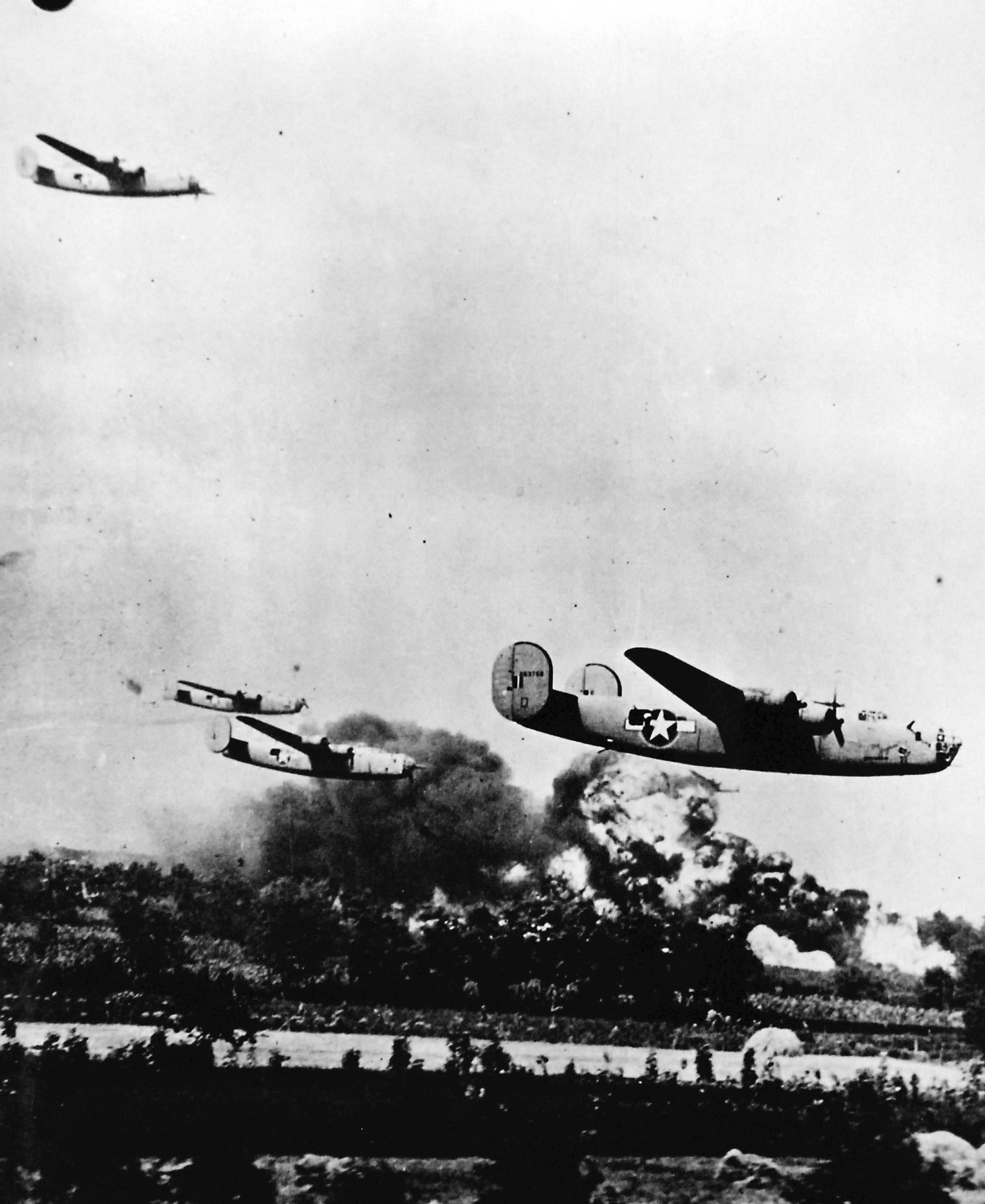
98th Bomb Group Liberators attacking Ploiești (Note: In the foreground is Consolidated B-24D-1-CF, serial 42-63758 Li’l Jughaid. Following in formation are Daisy Mae and Black Magic in the 1 August 1943 low level attack on Ploesti. Baugher, Joe (4 March 2023). "1942 USAF Serial Numbers". Joe Baugher.)

On 1 August 1943, the squadron participated in Operation Tidal Wave, the low-level raid on oil refineries near Ploiești, Romania. Alerted to the vulnerability of the Ploiești refineries by a June 1942 raid by the HALPRO project, the area around Ploiești had become one of the most heavily defended targets in Europe. The squadron pressed its attack on the Asta Romana Refinery through smoke and fire from bombing by another group's earlier attack and heavy flak defenses. The squadron's actions in this engagement earned it a second Distinguished Unit Citation. The squadron lost half of its B-24s on the Ploiești Raid.

When the forces driving East from Egypt and Libya met up with those moving westward from Algeria and Morocco in Tunisia in September 1943, Ninth Air Force was transferred to England to become the tactical air force for the invasion of the European Continent. The squadron, along with all Army Air Forces units in North Africa became part of Twelfth Air Force. In November 1943, the squadron moved to Brindisi Airport, Italy, where it became part of Fifteenth Air Force, which assumed control of strategic operations in the Mediterranean Theater of Operations, while Twelfth became a tactical air force.

==== Strategic operations in Italy ====
The squadron continued strategic bombardment raids on targets in occupied France, southern Germany, Czechoslovakia, Hungary, Austria and targets in the Balkans. These included industrial sites, airfields, harbors and lines of communication. Although focusing on strategic bombing, the squadron was sometimes diverted to tactical operations, supporting Operation Shingle, the landings at Anzio and the Battle of Monte Cassino. In the summer of 1944, the squadron supported Operation Dragoon, the invasion of southern France. The unit also assisted the Soviet advance into the Balkans, and supported Yugoslav Partisans and guerillas in neighboring countries.

==== Return to the United States ====
The squadron returned to the United States in May 1945. Upon arrival it was redesignated as a very heavy Boeing B-29 Superfortress squadron and began training for deployment to the Pacific to join strategic bombing campaign against Japan. In November 1945, the 98th Group was inactivated and the squadron moved to March Field, California, where it was assigned to the 40th Bombardment Group. B-29 training continued until the unit was inactivated in March 1946.

==== Medal of Honor ====
1st Lt. Donald D. Pucket was posthumously award the Medal of Honor for his actions in the attack against the oil installations in Ploesti, Rumania, on 9 July 1944. Just after "bombs away," his plane received heavy and direct hits from antiaircraft fire. One crewmember was instantly killed and 6 others severely wounded. The airplane was badly damaged, two engines were knocked out, the control cables cut, the oxygen system on fire, and the bomb bay flooded with gas and hydraulic fluid. He calmed the crew and administered first aid. He used the hand crank to open the jammed bomb bay doors to allow the gas to escape. The plane continued to lose altitude rapidly, so he ordered the crew to abandon ship. Three of the crew would not leave. he refused to abandon the 3 hysterical men and was last seen fighting to regain control of the plane. A few moments later the flaming bomber crashed on a mountainside.

=== Strategic Air Command ===
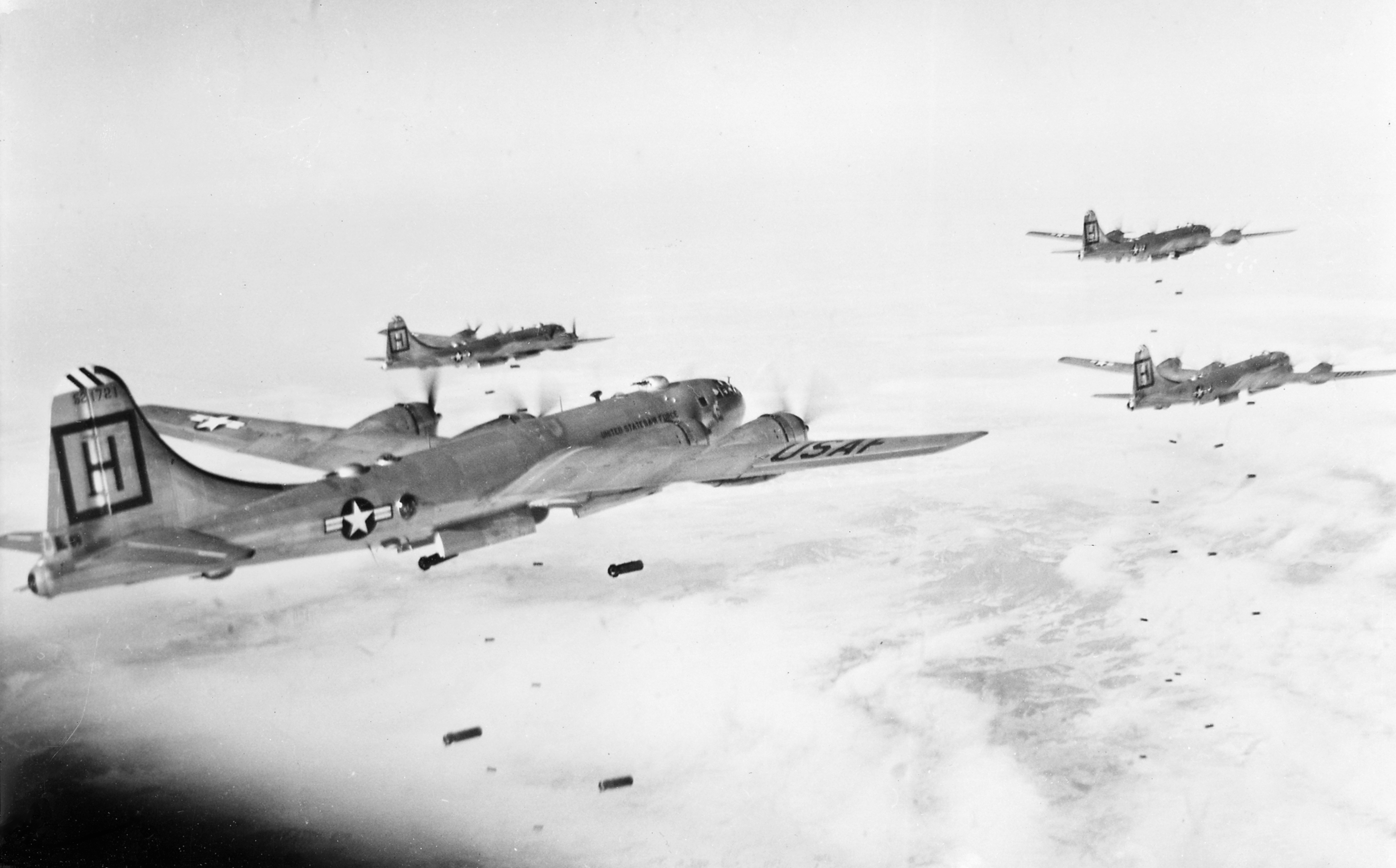
98th Bomb Group B-29s attacking a target in Korea (Note: In the foreground is Boeing B-29-90-BW Superfortress, serial 45-21721, which crashed after takeoff eight kilometers north of Yokota Air Base, Japan, on 7 February 1952. The crew of 13 were killed. Baugher, Joe (4 March 2023). "1945 USAF Serial Numbers". Joe Baugher.)

The squadron was reactivated in 1947 as a Strategic Air Command (SAC) Superfortress unit at Spokane Army Air Field, Washington. The squadron performed strategic bombardment training missions until the Korean War broke out.

In the summer of 1950, when the Korean War began, the 19th Bombardment Wing was the only medium bomber unit available for combat in the Pacific. In August, SAC dispatched the squadron and other elements of the 98th Bombardment Group to Yokota Air Base, Japan to augment Far East Air Forces Bomber Command, Provisional. The group flew its first combat mission on 7 August against marshalling yards near Pyongyang, capital of North Korea. The squadron's missions focused on interdiction of enemy lines of communications, attacking rail lines, bridges and roads. The squadron also flew missions that supported United Nations ground forces.

SAC's mobilization for the Korean War highlighted that SAC wing commanders were not sufficiently focused on combat operations. Under a plan implemented for most wings in February 1951 and finalized in June 1952, the wing commander focused primarily on the combat units and the maintenance necessary to support combat aircraft by having the combat and maintenance squadrons report directly to the wing and eliminating the intermediate group structures. This reorganization was implemented in April 1951 for the 98th Wing, when wing headquarters moved on paper to Japan, taking over the personnel and functions of the 98th Group, which became a paper organization, and the squadron began operating under wing control.

Starting in January 1952, the threat posed by enemy interceptors forced the squadron to fly only night missions. The unit flew its last mission, a propaganda leaflet drop, on the last day before the armistice was signed. After the truce began, the squadron conducted training missions and remained in combat ready status in Japan until July 1954 when it moved to Lincoln Air Force Base, Nebraska.

==== Conversion to jet bombers ====
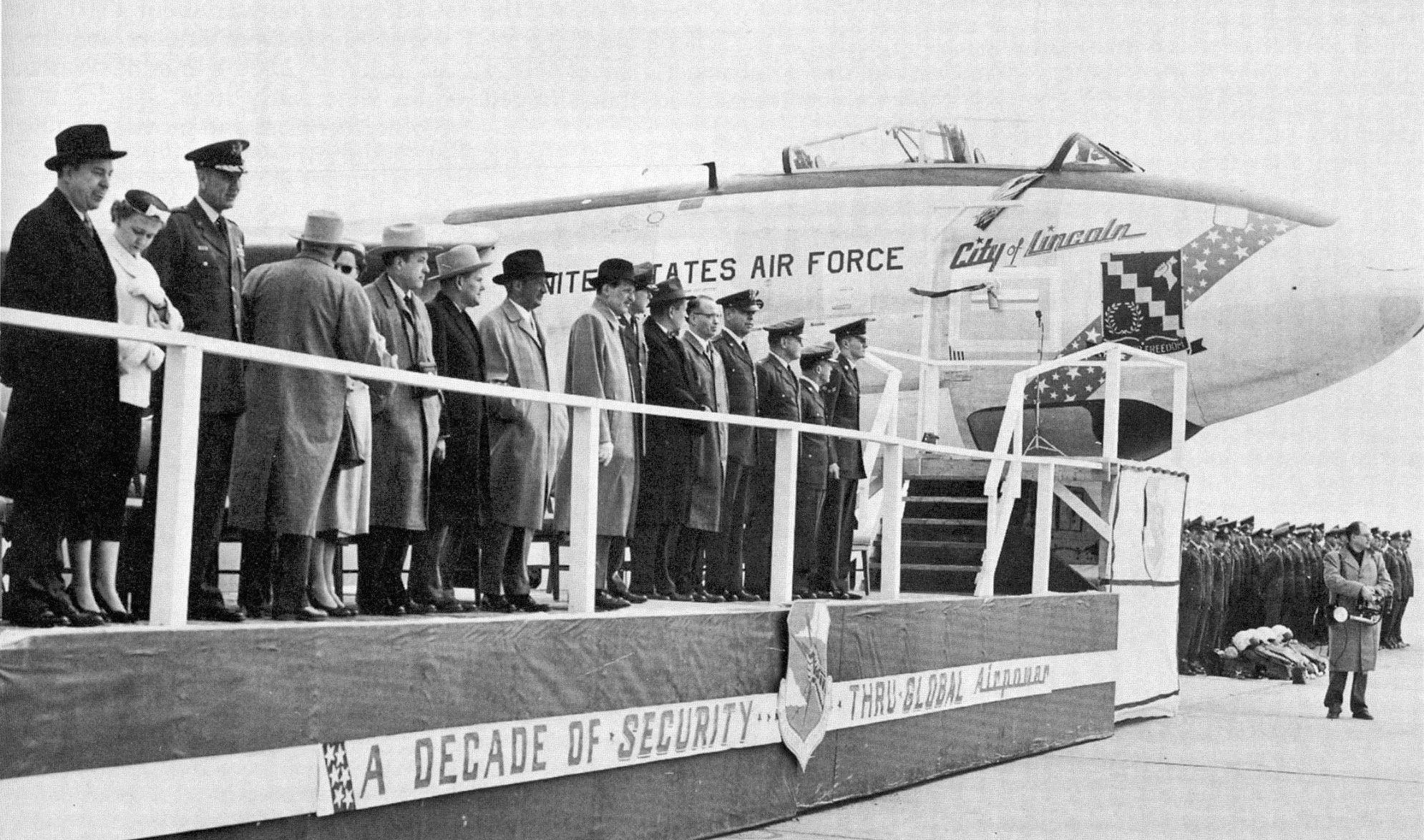
Dedication of first Boeing B-47 at Lincoln AFB (Note: Aircraft is Douglas Aircraft built Boeing B-47E-55-DT, serial 53-2134. City of Lincoln. This plane crashed on landing at RAF Greenham Common on 5 February 1963. Baugher, Joe (2 April 2023). "1953 USAF Serial Numbers". Joe Baugher.)

The squadron disposed of its B-29s to storage at Davis–Monthan Air Force Base, Arizona. At Lincoln, the squadron was equipped with new Boeing B-47E Stratojets. it engaged in strategic bombardment training with the B-47 throughout the rest of the 1950s, into the early 1960s. From November 1955 through January 1966, the squadron deployed to RAF Lakenheath.

From 1958, the 343d began to assume an alert posture at its home base, reducing the amount of time spent on alert at overseas bases to meet General Thomas S. Power's initial goal of maintaining one third of SAC's planes on fifteen minute ground alert, fully fueled and ready for combat to reduce vulnerability to a Soviet missile strike. The alert commitment was increased to half the squadron's aircraft in 1962.

==== Cuban Missile Crisis ====
Soon after detection of Soviet missiles in Cuba, on 22 October 1962 the squadron's B-47s dispersed. On 24 October the 343d went to DEFCON 2, placing all its aircraft on alert. Most dispersal bases were civilian airfields with AF Reserve or Air National Guard units. The unit's B-47s were configured for execution of the Emergency War Order as soon as possible after dispersing. On 15 November 1/6 of the squadron's dispersed B-47s were recalled to Lincoln. The remaining B-47s and their supporting tankers were recalled on 24 November. On 27 November SAC returned its bomber units to normal alert posture. The squadron was inactivated in June 1966 with the phaseout of the B-47 and closure of Lincoln.

=== Air Force Reserve ===
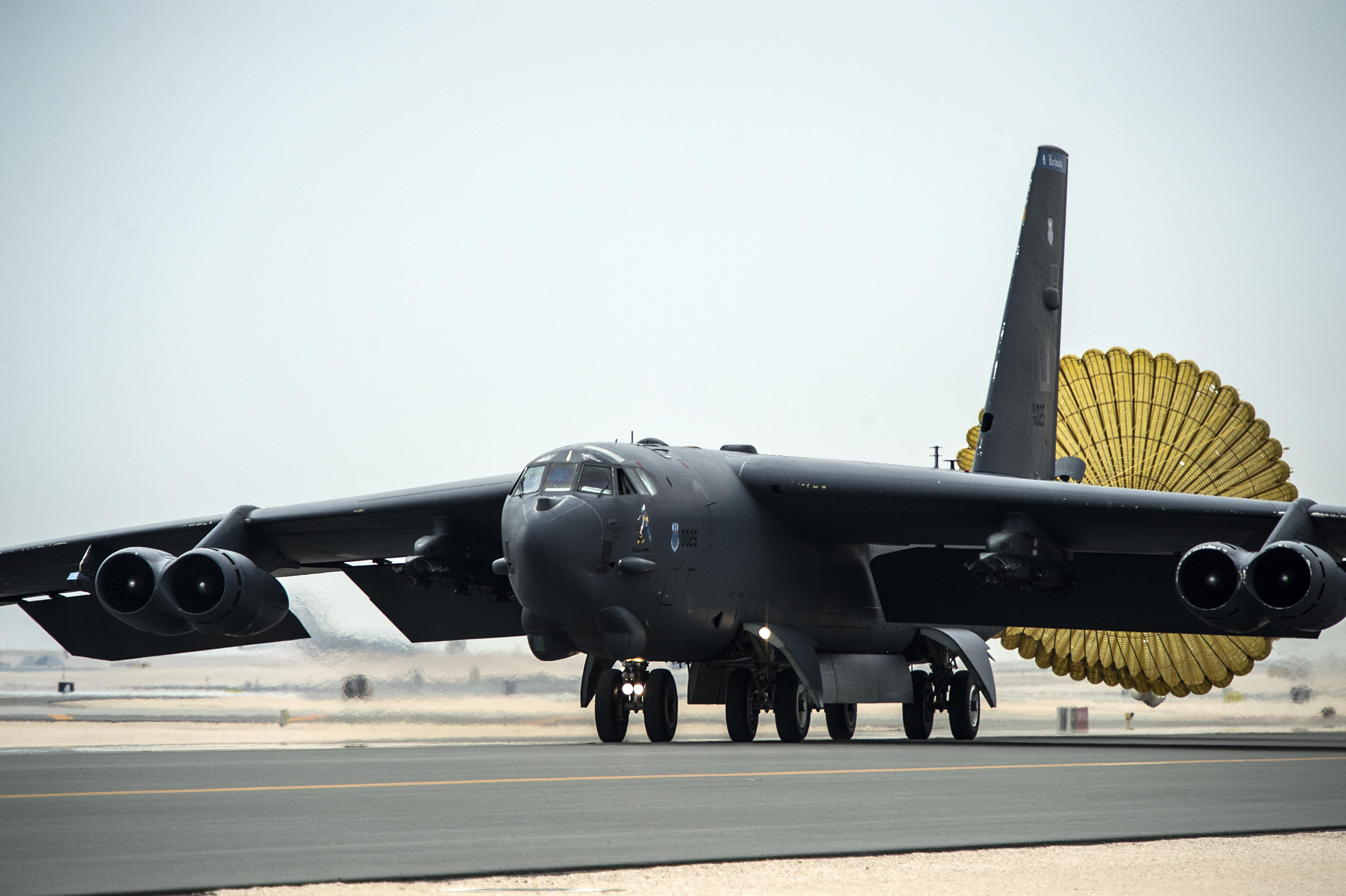
B-52H from Barksdale arrives at Al Udeid Air Base, Qatar. (Note: Taken on 9 April 2016. Barksdale B-52s supported Operation Inherent Resolve.)

The squadron was reactivated at Barksdale Air Force Base, Louisiana as an Air Force Reserve Command B-52 Stratofortress squadron in January 2010. The squadron routinely deployed aircrew and maintainers for B-52 missions from Al Udeid Air Base, Qatar for Operation Inherent Resolve and Operation Freedom's Sentinel.

On 19 April 2013, the 343rd Bomb Squadron participated in their first nuclear readiness exercise. As the only B-52 squadron in the Air Force Reserve, the 343rd BS is also the only nuclear certified squadron in the Air Force Reserve.

The 343rd Bomb Squadron received the Mitchell Trophy for most accurate munition drop during the Global Strike Challenge 2017. Global Strike Challenge is a bomber, intercontinental ballistic missile, helicopter operations and security forces competition with units from Air Force Global Strike Command, Air Combat Command, Air Force Reserve Command and the Air National Guard.

During Global Strike Challenge 2019, the 343rd Bomb Squadron consecutively earned the Mitchell Trophy for most accurate munitions drop. They were also awarded with the Linebacker Trophy for best B-52 Squadron and the LeMay Trophy for best bomber operations, as the top performing unit.

== Lineage ==
- Constituted 343d Bombardment Squadron (Heavy) on 28 January 1942

Activated on 3 February 1942
Redesignated 343d Bombardment Squadron, Heavy on 1 July 1943

- Redesignated 343d Bombardment Squadron, Very Heavy on 23 May 1945

Inactivated on 27 March 1946

- Activated on 1 July 1947

Redesignated 343d Bombardment Squadron, Medium on 28 May 1948
Discontinued, and inactivated on 25 June 1966

- Redesignated as 343d Bomb Squadron on 9 March 2010

Activated on 1 April 2010

=== Assignments ===
- 98th Bombardment Group, 3 February 1942
- 40th Bombardment Group, 10 November 1945 – 27 March 1946
- 98th Bombardment Group, 1 July 1947 (attached to 98th Bombardment Wing after 1 April 1951)
- 98th Bombardment Wing (later 98th Strategic Aerospace Wing), 16 June 1952 – 25 June 1966
- 917th Operations Group, 1 April 2010
- 307th Operations Group, 8 January 2011 – present

=== Stations ===
- MacDill Field, Florida, 3 February 1942
- Barksdale Field, Louisiana, 16 February 1942
- Page Field, Florida, 30 March 1942
- Drane Field, Florida, 15 May–3 July 1942
- RAF Ramat David, Palestine, 7 August 1942
- St Jean d'Acre Airfield, Palestine, 21 August 1942
- RAF Kabrit, Egypt, 10 November 1942
- RAF Gambut, Libya, 31 January 1943
- Lete Airfield, Libya, 3 March 1943
- Hergla Airfield, Tunisia, 25 September 1943
- Brindisi Airport, Italy, 18 November 1943
- Manduria Airfield, Italy, 19 December 1943
- Lecce Airfield, Italy, 17 January 1944 – 19 April 1945
- Fairmont Army Air Field, Nebraska, 8 May 1945
- McCook Army Air Field, Nebraska, 25 June 1945
- March Field, California, 10 November 1945 – 27 March 1946
- Andrews Field, Maryland, 1 July 1947
- Spokane Army Air Field (later Spokane Air Force Base, Fairchild Air Force Base), Washington, 24 September 1947
- Yokota Air Base, Japan, 5 August 1950 – 22 July 1954
- Lincoln Air Force Base, Nebraska, 25 July 1954 – 25 June 1966 (deployed to RAF Lakenheath, England, 12 November 1955 – 28 January 1956)
- Barksdale Air Force Base, Louisiana, 1 April 2010 – present

=== Aircraft ===
- Consolidated B-24 Liberator, 1942–1945
- Boeing B-29 Superfortress, 1945; 1947–1954
- Boeing B-47 Stratojet, 1954–1966
- Boeing B-52 Stratofortress, 2010–present

=== Awards and campaigns ===
Award streamer	Award	Dates	Notes
	Distinguished Unit Citation	August 1942–17 August 1943	North Africa and Sicily 343d Bombardment Squadron
	Distinguished Unit Citation	1 August 1943	Ploesti, Romania, 343d Bombardment Squadron
	Distinguished Unit Citation	1 December 1952–30 April 1953	Korea, 343d Bombardment Squadron
	Air Force Outstanding Unit Award	1 July 1964–1 June 1965	343d Bombardment Squadron
	Air Force Outstanding Unit Award	1 January–31 December 2014	343d Bomb Squadron
	Air Force Outstanding Unit Award	1 January–31 December 2015	343d Bomb Squadron
	Air Force Outstanding Unit Award	1 January–31 December 2016	343d Bomb Squadron
	Air Force Outstanding Unit Award	1 January–31 December 2019	343d Bomb Squadron
	Republic of Korea Presidential Unit Citation	[7 August] 1950–27 July 1953	Korea, 343d Bombardment Squadron (Note: AFHRA adjusted the start date for this award to agree with the squadron's first combat mission.)

Campaign Streamer	Campaign	Dates	Notes
	Antisubmarine	3 February 1942–3 July 1942	343d Bombardment Squadron (Note: Robertson lists this as a service streamer, rather than a campaign streamer. However, American Campaign credit without participation in the Antisubmarine Campaign was only awarded after a full year service in theater.)
	Air Combat, EAME Theater	7 August 1942–11 May 1945	343d Bombardment Squadron
	Air Offensive, Europe	7 August 1942–5 June 1944	343d Bombardment Squadron
	Egypt-Libya	7 August 1942–12 February 1943	343d Bombardment Squadron
	Tunisia	12 November 1942–13 May 1943	343d Bombardment Squadron
	Sicily	14 May 1943–17 August 1943	343d Bombardment Squadron
	Naples-Foggia	18 August 1943–21 January 1944	343d Bombardment Squadron
	Anzio	22 January 1944–24 May 1944	343d Bombardment Squadron
	Rome-Arno	22 January 1944–9 September 1944	343d Bombardment Squadron
	Central Europe	22 March 1944–21 May 1945	343d Bombardment Squadron
	Normandy	6 June 1944–24 July 1944	343d Bombardment Squadron
	Northern France	25 July 1944–14 September 1944	343d Bombardment Squadron
	Southern France	15 August 1944–14 September 1944	343d Bombardment Squadron
	North Apennines	10 September 1944–4 April 1945	343d Bombardment Squadron
	Rhineland	15 September 1944–21 March 1945	343d Bombardment Squadron
	Po Valley	3 April 1945–8 May 1945	343d Bombardment Squadron
	UN Defensive	7 August 1950–15 September 1950	343d Bombardment Squadron
	UN Offensive	16 September 1950–2 November 1950	343d Bombardment Squadron
	CCF Intervention	3 November 1950–24 January 1951	343d Bombardment Squadron
	1st UN Counteroffensive	25 January 1951–21 April 1951	343d Bombardment Squadron
	CCF Spring Offensive	22 April 1951–9 July 1951	
	UN Summer-Fall Offensive	9 July 1951–27 November 1951	
	Second Korean Winter	28 November 1951–30 April 1952	
	Korea Summer-Fall 1952	1 May 1952–30 November 1952	
	Third Korean Winter	1 December 1952–30 April 1953	
	Korea Summer-Fall 1953	1 May 1953–27 July 1953	

== See also ==
- B-24 Liberator units of the United States Army Air Forces
- List of B-29 Superfortress operators
- List of B-47 units of the United States Air Force
- List of United States Air Force squadrons

== External link ==
- "B-47 Stratojet Historical Website". B-47 Association.
