= 345th Bomb Squadron =

US Air Force Reserve unit

345th Bomb Squadron

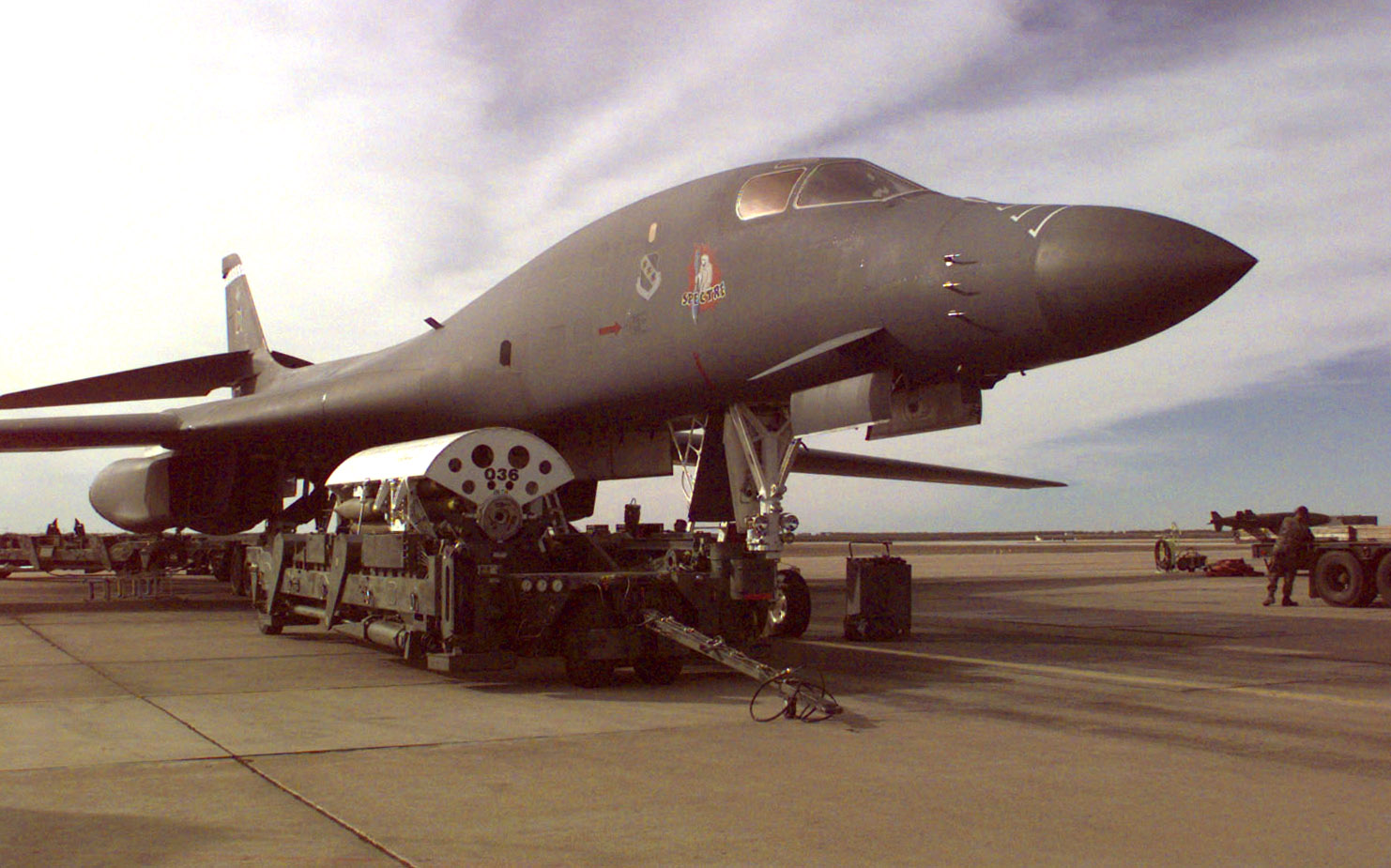
- B-1 Lancer at Dyess AFB
- Active: 1942–1946; 1947–1966; 2015–present
- Country: United States
- Branch: United States Air Force
- Role: Bomber
- Part of: Air Force Reserve Command
- Garrison/HQ: Dyess Air Force Base
- Engagements: Mediterranean Theater of Operations; Korean War
- Decorations: Distinguished Unit Citation; Republic of Korea Presidential Unit Citation

Insignia
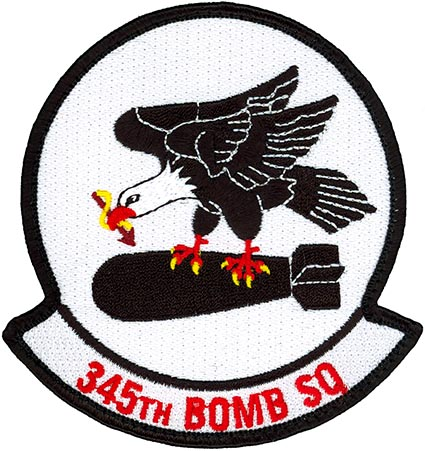
- 345th Bomb Sq emblem (Note: Approved 7 December 1956. Description: On a disc white, edged black, a stylized eagle perched on a bomb, all black, detail outlines of eagle and bomb white, is head white, eyeball beak and feet red, talons yellow; holding in his beak an arrow purple, the shaft entwined with a cord golden yellow. Significance: The eagle is symbolic of our country [as shown on] the Great Seal of the United States of America, and is emblematic of strength, courage, ferocity, and fighting spirit; qualities appropriately used as the emblem of this . . . organization. The arrow in the eagle's beak is symbolic of swift, direct, unwavering flight to the heart of the target. The bomb carried in the claws of the eagle signifies that the Squadron is a bombardment squadron.)

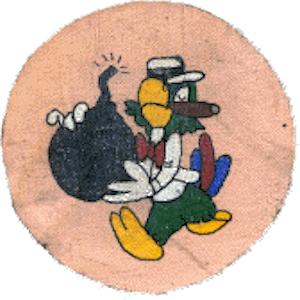
- Patch with early 345th Bombardment Squadron emblem

The 345th Bomb Squadron is a United States Air Force Reserve squadron, assigned to the 489th Bomb Group. It is stationed at Dyess Air Force Base, Texas, where it is an associate unit of the 7th Bomb Wing.

The squadron was first activated during World War II as the 345th Bombardment Squadron. It saw combat in the Mediterranean Theater of Operations, participating in the low level attack on oil refineries near Ploiești, Romania. It earned two Distinguished Unit Citation (DUC)s for its combat operations. After VE Day the squadron returned to the United States and trained with Boeing B-29 Superfortresses until inactivating in Spring 1946.

The squadron was reactivated in 1947 with Superfortresses. During the Korean War, it deployed to Japan and earned another DUC for its combat operations. The squadron returned to the United States and converted to the Boeing B-47 Stratojet, which if flew until inactivating in 1966 when the B-47 was withdrawn from service and Lincoln Air Force Base closed. It was activated as an associate unit at Dyess in 2015.

== Mission ==
The 345th Bomb Squadron operates in a classic association with the 9th Bomb Squadron, flying the Rockwell B-1B Lancer and providing deployable combat aviators. When it is the major force provider, its deployed elements are designated the 345th Expeditionary Bomb Squadron.

== History ==
=== World War II ===
==== Training in the United States ====
The squadron was first activated at MacDill Field, Florida as one of the original four squadrons assigned to the 98th Bombardment Group. The 345th soon moved to Barksdale Field, Louisiana, where it began to train as a Consolidated B-24 Liberator heavy bomber squadron under Third Air Force.

The squadron's training was short and it deployed to Egypt in July 1942 over the South Atlantic Ferrying Route transiting from Morrison Field, Florida though the Caribbean Sea to Brazil. It made the Atlantic crossing from Brazil to Liberia, then transited east across central Africa to Sudan. The air echelon of the group reformed with the ground echelon which traveled by the SS Pasteur around the Cape of Good Hope, joining with the air echelon of the squadron and the 415th Bombardment Squadron at RAF Ramat David, in Palestine.

==== Combat in the Middle East ====
Upon arrival in the Near East, the squadron became part of United States Army Middle East Air Force, which was replaced by Ninth Air Force in November. It entered combat in August, attacking shipping and harbor installations to cut Axis supply lines to North Africa. It also bombed airfields and rail transit lines in Sicily and mainland Italy. The squadron moved forward with Ninth Air Force to airfields in Egypt; Libya and Tunisia supporting the British Eighth Army in the Western Desert Campaign. Its support of this campaign earned the squadron the Distinguished Unit Citation (DUC).

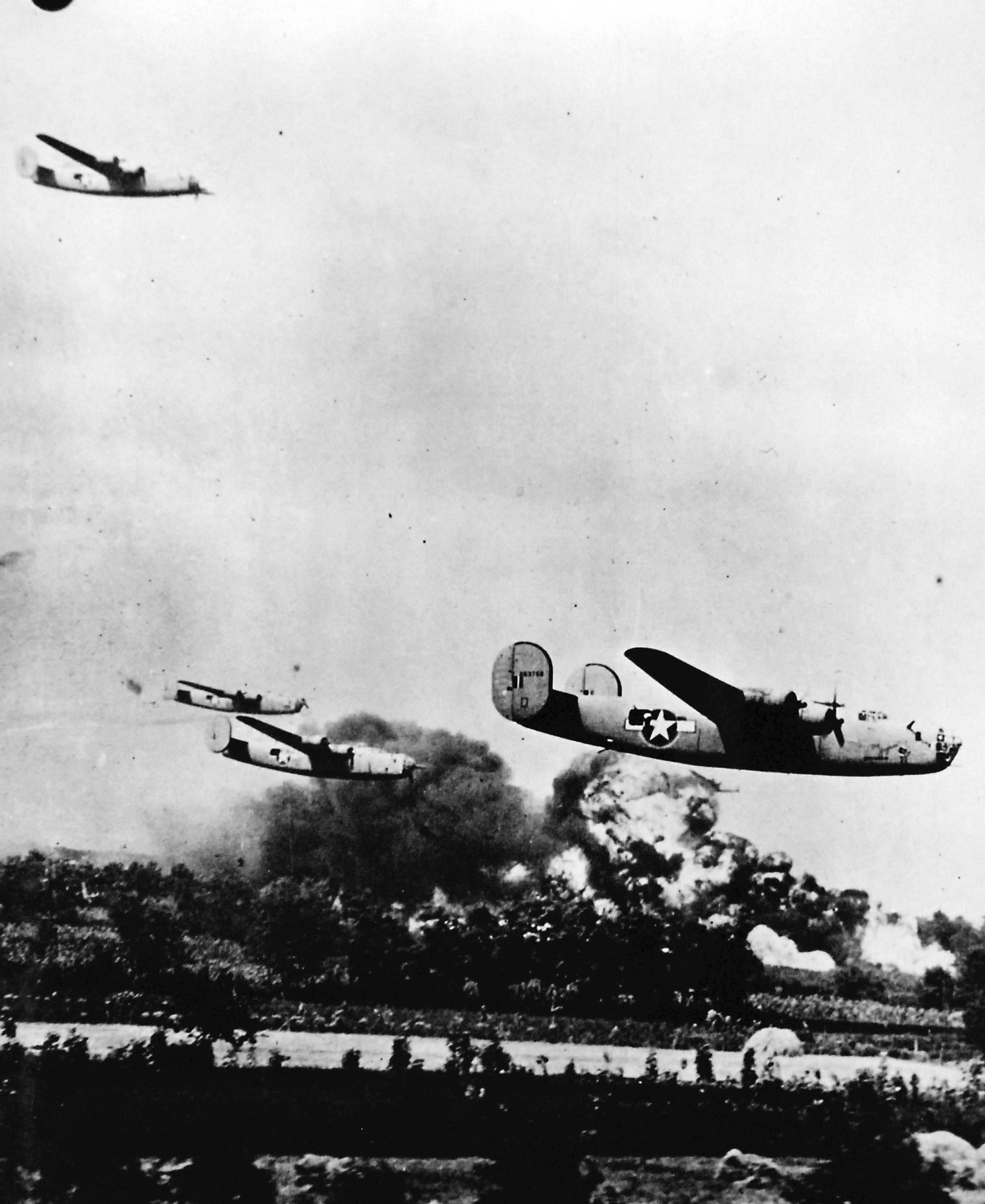
98th Bomb Group Liberators attacking Ploiești (Note: In the foreground is Consolidated B-24D-1-CF, serial 42-63758 Li’l Jughaid. Following in formation are Daisy Mae and Black Magic in the 1 August 1943 low level attack on Ploesti. Baugher, Joe (4 March 2023). "1942 USAF Serial Numbers". Joe Baugher.)

On 1 August 1943, the squadron participated in Operation Tidal Wave, the low-level raid on oil refineries near Ploiești, Romania. Alerted to the vulnerability of the Ploiești refineries by a June 1942 raid by the HALPRO project, the area around Ploiești had become one of the most heavily defended targets in Europe. The squadron pressed its attack on the Asta Romana Refinery through smoke and fire from bombing by another group's earlier attack and heavy flak defenses. The squadron's actions in this engagement earned it a second DUC.

When the forces driving East from Egypt and Libya met up with those moving westward from Algeria and Morocco in Tunisia in September 1943, Ninth Air Force was transferred to England to become the tactical air force for the invasion of the European Continent. The squadron, along with all Army Air Forces units in North Africa became part of Twelfth Air Force. In November 1943, the squadron moved to Brindisi Airport, Italy, where it became part of Fifteenth Air Force, which assumed control of strategic operations in the Mediterranean Theater of Operations, while Twelfth became a tactical air force.

==== Strategic operations in Italy ====
The squadron continued strategic bombardment raids on targets in Occupied France, southern Germany, Czechoslovakia, Hungary, Austria and targets in the Balkans. These included industrial sites, airfields, harbors and lines of communication. Although focusing on strategic bombing, the squadron was sometimes diverted to tactical operations, supporting Operation Shingle, the landings at Anzio and the Battle of Monte Cassino. In the summer of 1944, the squadron supported Operation Dragoon, the invasion of southern France. The unit also assisted the Soviet advance into the Balkans, and supported Yugoslav Partisans and guerillas in neighboring countries.

==== Return to the United States ====
The squadron returned to the United States in May 1945. Upon arrival it was redesignated as a very heavy Boeing B-29 Superfortress squadron and began training for deployment to the Pacific to conduct strategic bombardment raids on Japan. In November 1945, the 98th Group was inactivated and the squadron moved to MacDill Field, Florida, where it was assigned to the 462d Bombardment Group. B-29 training continued until the unit was inactivated in July 1946.

=== Strategic Air Command ===
==== Reactivation ====
The squadron was reactivated in 1947 as a Strategic Air Command (SAC) Superfortress unit at Spokane Army Air Field, Washington. The squadron performed strategic bombardment training missions until the outbreak of the Korean War.

==== Korean War ====
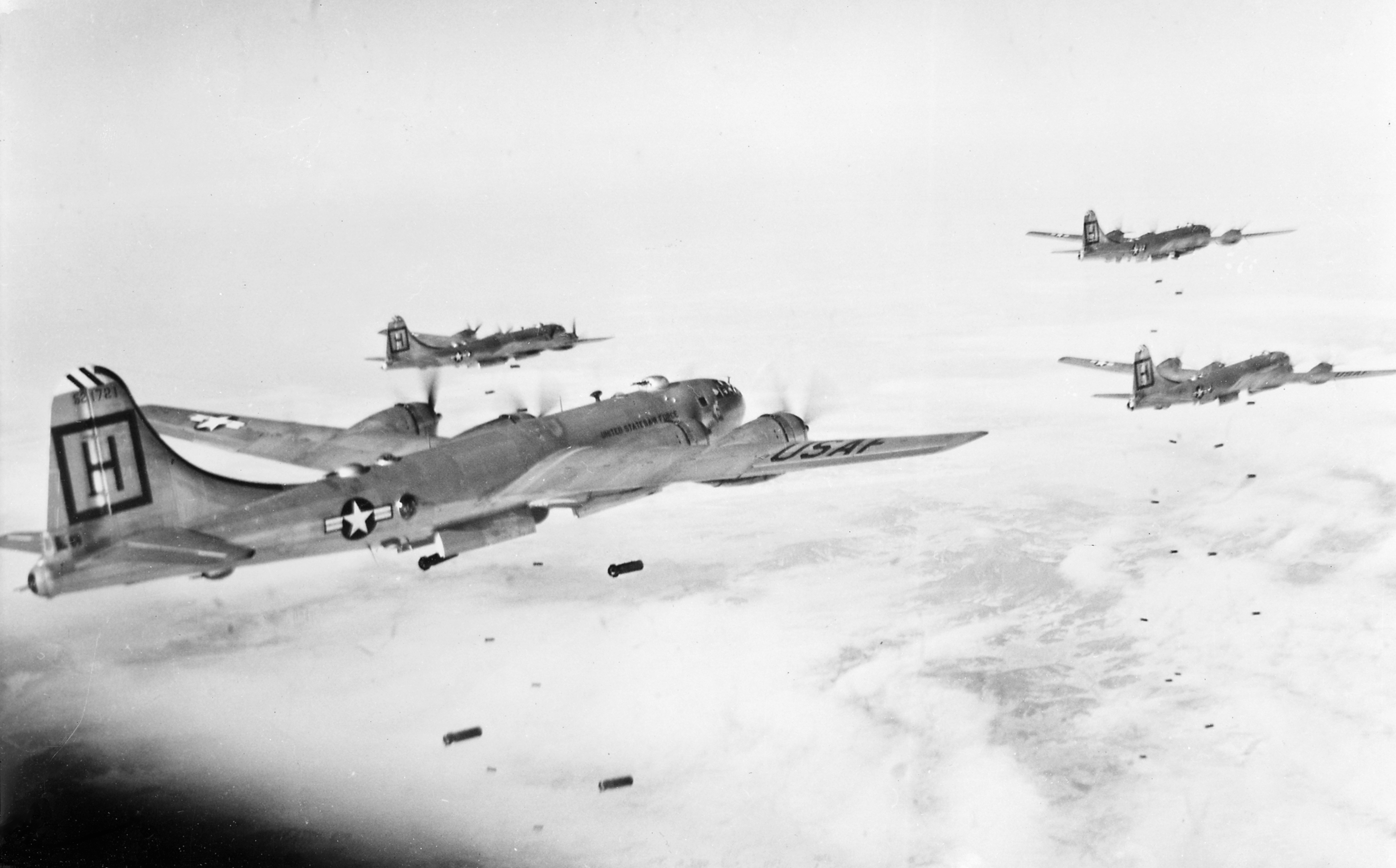
98th Bomb Group B-29s attacking a target in Korea (Note: In the foreground is Boeing B-29-90-BW Superfortress, serial 45-21721, which crashed after takeoff eight kilometers north of Yokota Air Base, Japan, on 7 February 1952. The crew of 13 were killed. Baugher, Joe (4 March 2023). "1945 USAF Serial Numbers". Joe Baugher.)

In the summer of 1950, when the Korean War began, the 19th Bombardment Wing was the only medium bomber unit available for combat in the Pacific. In August, SAC dispatched the squadron and other elements of the 98th Bombardment Group to Yokota Air Base, Japan to augment FEAF Bomber Command, Provisional. The group flew its first combat mission on 7 August against marshalling yards near Pyongyang, capital of North Korea. The squadron's missions focused on interdiction of enemy lines of communications, attacking rail lines, bridges and roads. The squadron also flew missions that supported United Nations ground forces.

SAC’s mobilization for the Korean War highlighted that SAC wing commanders were not sufficiently focused on combat operations. Under a plan implemented for most wings in February 1951 and finalized in June 1952, the wing commander focused primarily on the combat units and the maintenance necessary to support combat aircraft by having the combat and maintenance squadrons report directly to the wing and eliminating the intermediate group structures. This reorganization was implemented in April 1951 for the 98th Wing, when wing headquarters moved on paper to Japan, taking over the personnel and functions of the 98th Group, which became a paper organization, and the squadron began operating under wing control.

Starting in January 1952, the threat posed by enemy interceptors forced the squadron to fly only night missions. The unit flew its last mission, a propaganda leaflet drop, on the last day before the armistice was signed. The squadron conducted training missions and remained in combat ready status in Japan until July 1954 when it moved to Lincoln Air Force Base, Nebraska.

==== Conversion to jet bombers ====
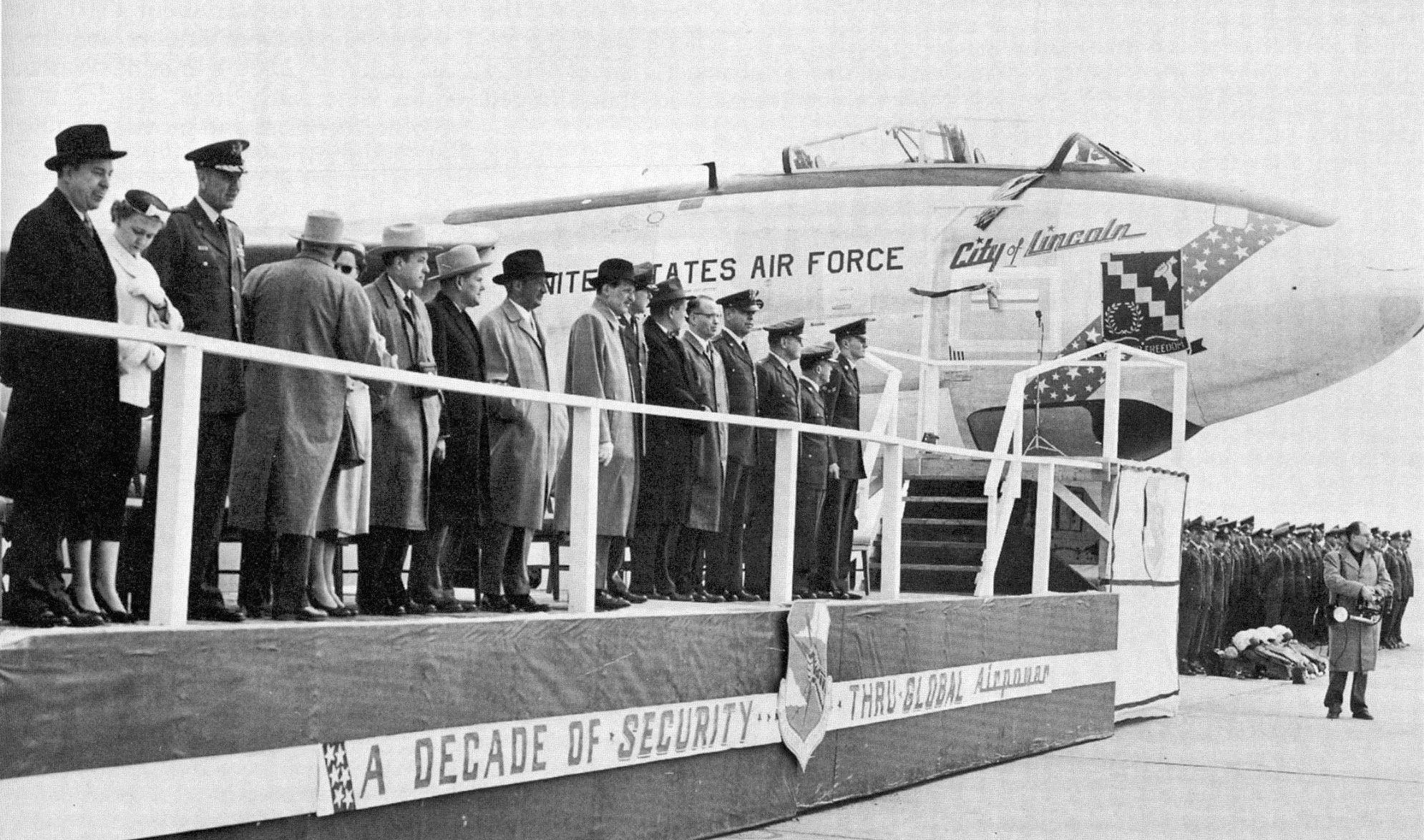
Dedication of first Boeing B-47 at Lincoln AFB (Note: Aircraft is Douglas Aircraft built Boeing B-47E-55-DT, serial 53-2134. City of Lincoln. This plane crashed on landing at RAF Greenham Common on 5 February 1963. Baugher, Joe (2 April 2023). "1953 USAF Serial Numbers". Joe Baugher.)

The squadron disposed of its B-29s to storage at Davis–Monthan Air Force Base, Arizona. At Lincoln, the squadron was equipped with new Boeing B-47E Stratojets. It engaged in strategic bombardment training with the B-47 throughout the rest of the 1950s, into the early 1960s. From November 1955 through January 1966, the squadron deployed to RAF Lakenheath .

From 1958, the 345th began to assume an alert posture at its home base, reducing the amount of time spent on alert at overseas bases to meet General Thomas S. Power's initial goal of maintaining one third of SAC’s planes on fifteen minute ground alert, fully fueled and ready for combat to reduce vulnerability to a Soviet missile strike. The alert commitment was increased to half the squadron's aircraft in 1962.

==== Cuban Missile Crisis ====
Soon after detection of Soviet missiles in Cuba, on 22 October 1962 the squadron's B-47s dispersed. On 24 October the 343d went to DEFCON 2, placing all its aircraft on alert. Most dispersal bases were civilian airfields with AF Reserve or Air National Guard units. The unit's B-47s were configured for execution of the Emergency War Order as soon as possible after dispersing. On 15 November 1/6 of the squadron's dispersed B-47s were recalled to Lincoln. The remaining B-47s and their supporting tankers were recalled on 24 November. On 27 November SAC returned its bomber units to normal alert posture.

The squadron was inactivated in June 1966 with the phaseout of the B-47 and closure of Lincoln.

=== Air Force reserve ===
In October 2015, the squadron, now named the 345th Bomb Squadron was activated at Dyess Air Force Base, Texas as an associate. The squadron operates and maintains the Rockwell B-1 Lancers assigned to the 7th Bomb Wing at Dyess.

From February through August 2017 squadron personnel provided "Continuous Bomber Presence" in the Pacific Theater. It deployed personnel to RAF Fairford, maintaining two B-1 Lancers in an integrated detachment of the 7th Bomb Wing and 489th Bomb Group. In June 2018, the squadron led a bomber task force in support of the joint, multinational maritime-focused Exercise Baltic Operation. It has also deployed with the 9th Expeditionary Bomb Squadron.

== Lineage ==
- Constituted 345th Bombardment Squadron (Heavy) on 28 January 1942

Activated on 3 February 1942
Redesignated 345th Bombardment Squadron, Heavy on 1 July 1943
Redesignated 345th Bombardment Squadron, Very Heavy on 23 May 1945
Inactivated on 27 March 1946
Activated on 1 July 1947
Redesignated 345th Bombardment Squadron, Medium on 28 May 1948
Inactivated on 25 June 1966
Redesignated 345th Bomb Squadron
Activated on 17 October 2015

=== Assignments ===
- 98th Bombardment Group, 3 February 1942
- 462d Bombardment Group, 10 November 1945 – 27 March 1946
- 98th Bombardment Group, 1 July 1947 (attached to 98th Bombardment Wing after 1 April 1951)
- 98th Bombardment Wing (later 98th Strategic Aerospace Wing), 16 June 1952 – 25 June 1966
- 489th Bomb Group, 17 October 2015 – present

=== Stations ===
- MacDill Field, Florida, 3 February 1942
- Barksdale Field, Louisiana, c. 9 February 1942
- Page Field, Florida, 30 March 1942
- Drane Field, Florida, 16 May–3 July 1942
- RAF Ramat David, Palestine, 5 August 1942
- RAF Fayid, Egypt, 16 November 1942
- Tobruk Airport, Libya, 25 January 1943
- Benina Airfield, Libya, 16 February 1943
- Hergla Airfield, Tunisia, 26 September 1943
- Brindisi Airport, Italy, 18 November 1943
- Manduria Airfield, Italy, 20 December 1943
- Lecce Airfield, Italy, 18 January 1944 – 19 April 1945
- Fairmont Army Air Field, Nebraska, 8 May 1945
- McCook Army Air Field, Nebraska, 25 June 1945
- MacDill Field, Florida, 10 November 1945 – 5 July 1946
- Andrews Field, Maryland, 1 July 1947
- Spokane Army Air Field (later Spokane Air Force Base, Fairchild Air Force Base), Washington, 24 September 1947
- Yokota Air Base, Japan, 5 August 1950
- Lincoln Air Force Base, Nebraska, 24 July 1954 – 25 June 1966
- Dyess Air Force Base, Texas, 17 October 2015 – present

=== Aircraft ===
- Consolidated B-24 Liberator, 1942–1945
- Boeing B-29 Superfortress, 1945; 1947–1954
- Boeing B-47 Stratojet, 1954–1966
- Rockwell B-1 Lancer, 2015–present

=== Awards and campaigns ===
Award streamer	Award	Dates	Notes
	Distinguished Unit Citation	August 1942–17 August 1943	North Africa and Sicily 345th Bombardment Squadron
	Distinguished Unit Citation	1 August 1943	Ploesti, Romania, 345th Bombardment Squadron
	Distinguished Unit Citation	1 December 1952–30 April 1953	Korea, 345th Bombardment Squadron
	Republic of Korea Presidential Unit Citation	[7 August] 1950–27 July 1953	Korea, 345th Bombardment Squadron (Note: AFHRA adjusted the start date for this award to agree with the squadron's first combat mission.)

Campaign Streamer	Campaign	Dates	Notes
	Antisubmarine	3 February 1942–3 July 1942	345th Bombardment Squadron (Note: Robertson lists this as a service streamer, rather than a campaign streamer. However, American Campaign credit without participation in the Antisubmarine Campaign was only awarded after a full year service in theater.)
	Air Combat, EAME Theater	7 August 1942–11 May 1945	345th Bombardment Squadron
	Air Offensive, Europe	7 August 1942–5 June 1944	345th Bombardment Squadron
	Egypt-Libya	7 August 1942–12 February 1943	345th Bombardment Squadron
	Tunisia	12 November 1942–13 May 1943	345th Bombardment Squadron
	Sicily	14 May 1943–17 August 1943	345th Bombardment Squadron
	Naples-Foggia	18 August 1943–21 January 1944	345th Bombardment Squadron
	Anzio	22 January 1944–24 May 1944	345th Bombardment Squadron
	Rome-Arno	22 January 1944–9 September 1944	345th Bombardment Squadron
	Central Europe	22 March 1944–21 May 1945	345th Bombardment Squadron
	Normandy	6 June 1944–24 July 1944	345th Bombardment Squadron
	Northern France	25 July 1944–14 September 1944	345th Bombardment Squadron
	Southern France	15 August 1944–14 September 1944	345th Bombardment Squadron
	North Apennines	10 September 1944–4 April 1945	345th Bombardment Squadron
	Rhineland	15 September 1944–21 March 1945	345th Bombardment Squadron
	Po Valley	3 April 1945–8 May 1945	345th Bombardment Squadron
	UN Defensive	7 August 1950–15 September 1950	345th Bombardment Squadron
	UN Offensive	16 September 1950–2 November 1950	345th Bombardment Squadron
	CCF Intervention	3 November 1950–24 January 1951	345th Bombardment Squadron
	1st UN Counteroffensive	25 January 1951–21 April 1951	345th Bombardment Squadron
	CCF Spring Offensive	22 April 1951–9 July 1951	345th Bombardment Squadron
	UN Summer-Fall Offensive	9 July 1951–27 November 1951	345th Bombardment Squadron
	Second Korean Winter	28 November 1951–30 April 1952	345th Bombardment Squadron
	Korea Summer-Fall 1952	1 May 1952–30 November 1952	345th Bombardment Squadron
	Third Korean Winter	1 December 1952–30 April 1953	345th Bombardment Squadron
	Korea Summer-Fall 1953	1 May 1953–27 July 1953	345th Bombardment Squadron

== See also ==
- B-24 Liberator units of the United States Army Air Forces
- List of B-29 Superfortress operators
- List of B-50 units of the United States Air Force
- List of B-47 units of the United States Air Force
