= Donald D. Pucket =

United States Army Air Forces Medal of Honor recipient

Donald Dale Pucket
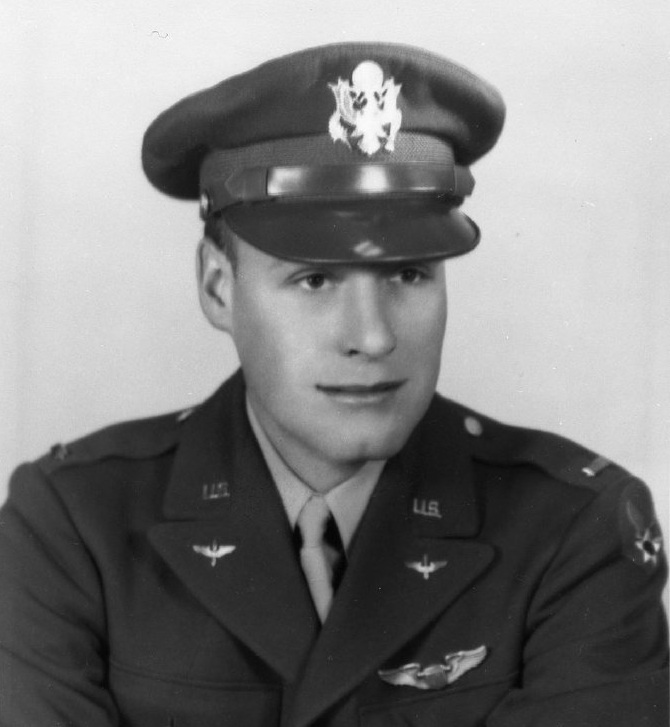
- Born: December 15, 1915; Longmont, Colorado, US
- Died: July 9, 1944 (aged 28) near Ploieşti, Romania
- Burial place: Jefferson Barracks National Cemetery in Saint Louis, Missouri
- Military career
- Allegiance: United States of America
- Branch: United States Army Air Forces
- Service years: 1942 - 1944
- Rank: First Lieutenant
- Units: 343rd Bombardment Squadron, 98th Bombardment Group
- Conflicts: World War II
- Awards: Medal of Honor; Distinguished Flying Cross; Air Medal (3); Purple Heart

Donald Dale Pucket (December 15, 1915 – July 9, 1944) was a United States Army Air Forces officer and a recipient of the United States military's highest decoration—the Medal of Honor—for his actions in World War II.

== Biography ==
Pucket joined the Army from Boulder, Colorado in 1942, and by July 9, 1944, was a first lieutenant piloting bombers with the 98th Bombardment Group. During a raid that day over Ploiești, Romania, his airplane was badly damaged by anti-aircraft fire. He ordered his crew to abandon the craft, but three men were too frightened to parachute out. Pucket voluntarily stayed behind with the men and tried unsuccessfully to regain control of the plane. The aircraft crashed into a mountainside, killing all on board. Pucket was posthumously awarded the Medal of Honor a year later, on June 23, 1945.

Aged 28 at his death, Pucket was buried at Jefferson Barracks National Cemetery in Saint Louis, Missouri.

== Citations ==
=== Medal of Honor ===
First Lieutenant Pucket's official Medal of Honor citation reads:

He took part in a highly effective attack against vital oil installation in Ploesti, Rumania, on 9 July 1944. Just after "bombs away," the plane received heavy and direct hits from antiaircraft fire. One crewmember was instantly killed and 6 others severely wounded. The airplane was badly damaged, 2 were knocked out, the control cables cut, the oxygen system on fire, and the bomb bay flooded with gas and hydraulic fluid. Regaining control of his crippled plane, 1st Lt. Pucket turned its direction over to the copilot. He calmed the crew, administered first aid, and surveyed the damage. Finding the bomb bay doors jammed, he used the hand crank to open them to allow the gas to escape. He jettisoned all guns and equipment but the plane continued to lose altitude rapidly. Realizing that it would be impossible to reach friendly territory he ordered the crew to abandon ship. Three of the crew, uncontrollable from fright or shock, would not leave. 1st Lt. Pucket urged the others to jump. Ignoring their entreaties to follow, he refused to abandon the 3 hysterical men and was last seen fighting to regain control of the plane. A few moments later the flaming bomber crashed on a mountainside. 1st Lt. Pucket, unhesitatingly and with supreme sacrifice, gave his life in his courageous attempt to save the lives of 3 others.

=== Distinguished Flying Cross ===
Citation:

The President of the United States of America, authorized by Act of Congress, July 2, 1926, takes pleasure in presenting the Distinguished Flying Cross to First Lieutenant (Air Corps) Donald Dale Pucket (ASN: 0-692817), United States Army Air Forces, for extraordinary achievement while participating in aerial flight while serving as Pilot of a B-24 Bomber with the 343d Bombardment Squadron, 98th Bombardment Group (H), EIGHTH Air Force. On 26 June 1944, while participating in a bombing mission against an enemy aircraft factory in Austria, Lieutenant Pucket’s formation encountered intense and accurate enemy anti-aircraft fire in the target area which severely damaged his plane and wounded one of his gunners. Shortly thereafter, a companion ship in his unit was hit by flak and forced out of the formation. Lieutenant Pucket gallantly elected to fall back with it to add the protection of the guns on his ship and both of these planes were attacked by an enemy aircraft which shot down the other B-24. The attacker was in turn destroyed by one of Lieutenant Pucket’s gunners. His courage and expert pilotage made possible a safe return with his damaged plane from deep in enemy territory, and a safe landing at home base, despite great mechanical difficulties. By his outstanding courage, professional skill and devotion to duty as evidenced throughout over twenty-nine (29) successful missions against the enemy, Lieutenant Pucket has reflected great credit upon himself and the Armed Forces of the United States of America.

== Awards and decorations ==
In addition to the Medal of Honor, Pucket also received the Distinguished Flying Cross, three Air Medals, and the Purple Heart.

Badge	Army Air Forces Pilot Badge		
1st row	Medal of Honor		
2nd row	Distinguished Flying Cross	Purple Heart	Air Medal with 2 Oak leaf clusters
3rd row	American Campaign Medal	European–African–Middle Eastern Campaign Medal with 5 Campaign stars	World War II Victory Medal
Unit awards	Presidential Unit Citation		

== See also ==
- List of Medal of Honor recipients for World War II
