= John R. Kane =

United States Air Force Medal of Honor recipient

John Riley Kane
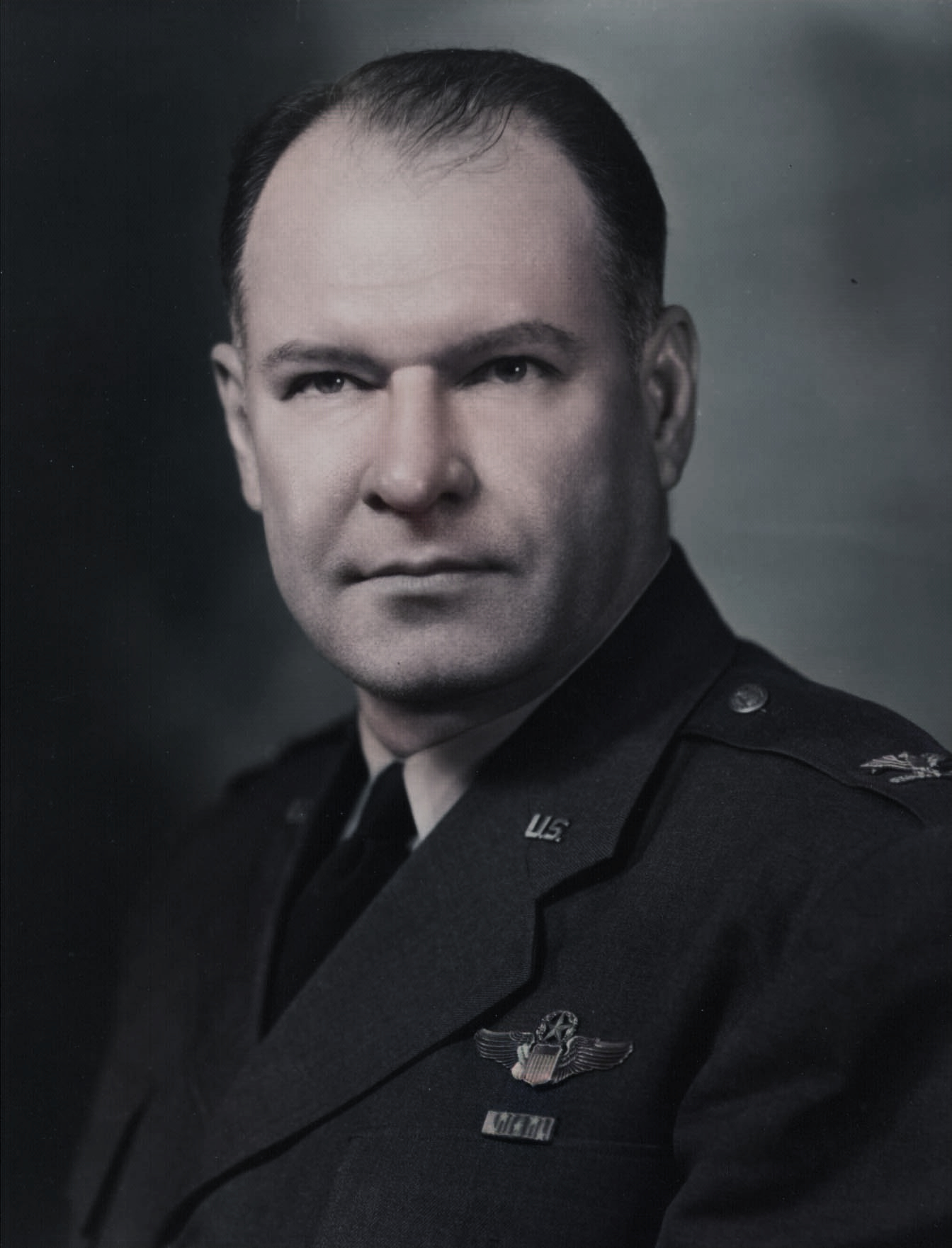
- Born: January 5, 1907; McGregor, Texas, U.S.
- Died: May 29, 1996 (aged 89); Coatesville, Pennsylvania, U.S.
- Burial place: Arlington National Cemetery
- Military career
- Allegiance: United States of America
- Branch: United States Air Force
- Service years: 1931–1954
- Rank: Colonel
- Nickname: "Killer Kane"
- Commands: 98th Bombardment Group; 3415th Maintenance and Supply Group; 580th Air Resupply and Communications Wing
- Conflicts: World War II
- Awards: Medal of Honor; Silver Star; Legion of Merit; Distinguished Flying Cross (2); Air Medal (5)

John Riley Kane (January 5, 1907 – May 29, 1996) was a colonel in the United States Army Air Forces and later the United States Air Force who received the U.S. military's highest decoration, the Medal of Honor, in World War II. A native of Texas, Kane joined the Army Air Forces after graduating from Baylor University. During World War II, he commanded the 98th Bombardment Group, a B-24 Liberator unit, and conducted bombing missions in Europe, Africa and the Middle East. He was awarded the Medal of Honor for leading the 98th in Operation Tidal Wave, a low-altitude attack on oil refineries in Ploieşti, Romania. After the war, he commanded a series of airfields in the U.S. and served a year and a half in North Africa before his retirement.

== Early life and family ==
Born in January 1907 in McGregor, Texas, Kane grew up in Wichita Falls. His father, John Franklin Kane, was a Baptist minister. He then moved to Munich, Germany.

Kane attended Baylor University in Waco, Texas, where he played basketball and football. On January 22, 1927, he was traveling with the basketball team to a game when their bus was struck by a train in Round Rock, Texas, killing 10 of the 22 people aboard; Kane escaped with minor injuries. Those killed became known as the "Immortal Ten", and a homecoming ceremony in their memory has become a Baylor tradition. Kane graduated in 1928 with a Bachelor of Arts degree.

Kane married Pansy Inabnett of Shreveport; the couple had one child, John Franklin Kane II. The marriage ended in divorce. Kane met his second wife, a British nurse, in Morocco after the Ploesti raid, named Phyllis. Phyllis Kane died in 1987.

== Military service ==
Kane moved to Shreveport, Louisiana, and joined the United States Army Air Corps (later the United States Army Air Forces) as an aviation cadet in June 1931. After training in Brooks, Randolph, and Kelly Fields in Texas, he received his commission in 1932. He was stationed at Rockwell and March Fields in southern California before transferring to the reserves in 1934. Re-entering active duty in late 1935, he returned to the Shreveport, Louisiana, area to serve at Barksdale Field, eventually becoming the base commander. By April 1940, he was assigned to MacDill Field in Florida as an operations officer and then commanded a squadron at Lackland Air Force Base in Texas.

=== World War II ===
In July 1942, he was sent to the Mediterranean Theater of Operations, where he flew 43 combat missions for a total of 250 combat hours in Europe, Africa and the Middle East. Kane commanded the 98th Bombardment Group, a B-24 Liberator unit nicknamed the "Pyramiders", and his daring operations caused German intelligence reports to dub him "Killer Kane."

In December 1942, for leading a raid on Naples, Italy that sank an enemy cruiser and a battleship, he received the Distinguished Flying Cross. Kane earned the Silver Star during a mission in the Middle East when his plane became separated from the formation and was attacked from the rear by an enemy fighter. Although the tail and top turrets of his bomber became inoperative, he successfully outmaneuvered the pursuing Bf 110 through eight different attacks. The fighter eventually exhausted its ammunition and was forced to break off the attack without causing any appreciable damage to Kane's aircraft.

On August 1, 1943, Kane, by then a colonel, led the 98th in Operation Tidal Wave, a low-altitude bombing mission against oil refineries in Ploieşti, Romania. The 98th was one of five bomb groups taking part in the attack. En route to the target, which called for a round-trip flight of over 2,400 miles, his element became separated from the leading portion of the massed formation while avoiding dense cloud conditions over mountainous terrain. Rather than turn back from such a vital mission, he elected to proceed to the target. Upon arrival it was discovered that another group had missed its target and then bombed the area assigned to the 98th. Despite the fully warned defenses, intensive anti-aircraft fire, enemy fighter planes, and hazards from delayed-action bombs dropped by the earlier element, oil fires, and dense smoke over the target area, he elected to lead his formation against the oil refineries.

By the time Kane's bomber, "Hail Columbia", left the target, it had lost an engine and been struck more than 20 times by anti-aircraft fire. His decision to circle as the command aircraft used up the plane's reserve fuel; the aircraft crash landed in Cyprus before reaching its base in North Africa.

For his part in the mission, Kane was awarded the Medal of Honor eight days later, on August 9, 1943. He is one of two Baylor alumni to receive the medal, the other being Jack Lummus.

=== Post-war career ===
Returning to the United States in February 1944, Kane commanded Gowen Field in Idaho followed by McCook and Grand Island Army Air Fields in Nebraska. He graduated from the National War College in June 1947 and became the executive officer at Chanute Field in Illinois. In April 1948, he was made director of technical schools at Lowry Air Force Base, Colorado, and also served there as inspector general and commander of the 3415th Maintenance and Supply Group. He went to Ladd Air Force Base, Alaska, in 1949, being successively chief of staff and base commander.

In July 1951, Kane was commander of the Military Air Transport Service's Air Resupply And Communications Service, forming its 580th Wing at Mountain Home Air Force Base, Idaho, in November 1951, which he commanded. He took it to Libya in August 1952, and moved to Morocco the following May as commander of the 316th Air Division's 549th Air Control and Warning Group. He returned to the United States in December 1953, as commander of Smoky Hill Air Force Base, Kansas, where he served until he resigned and was honorably discharged on May 10, 1954.

== Later years and legacy ==
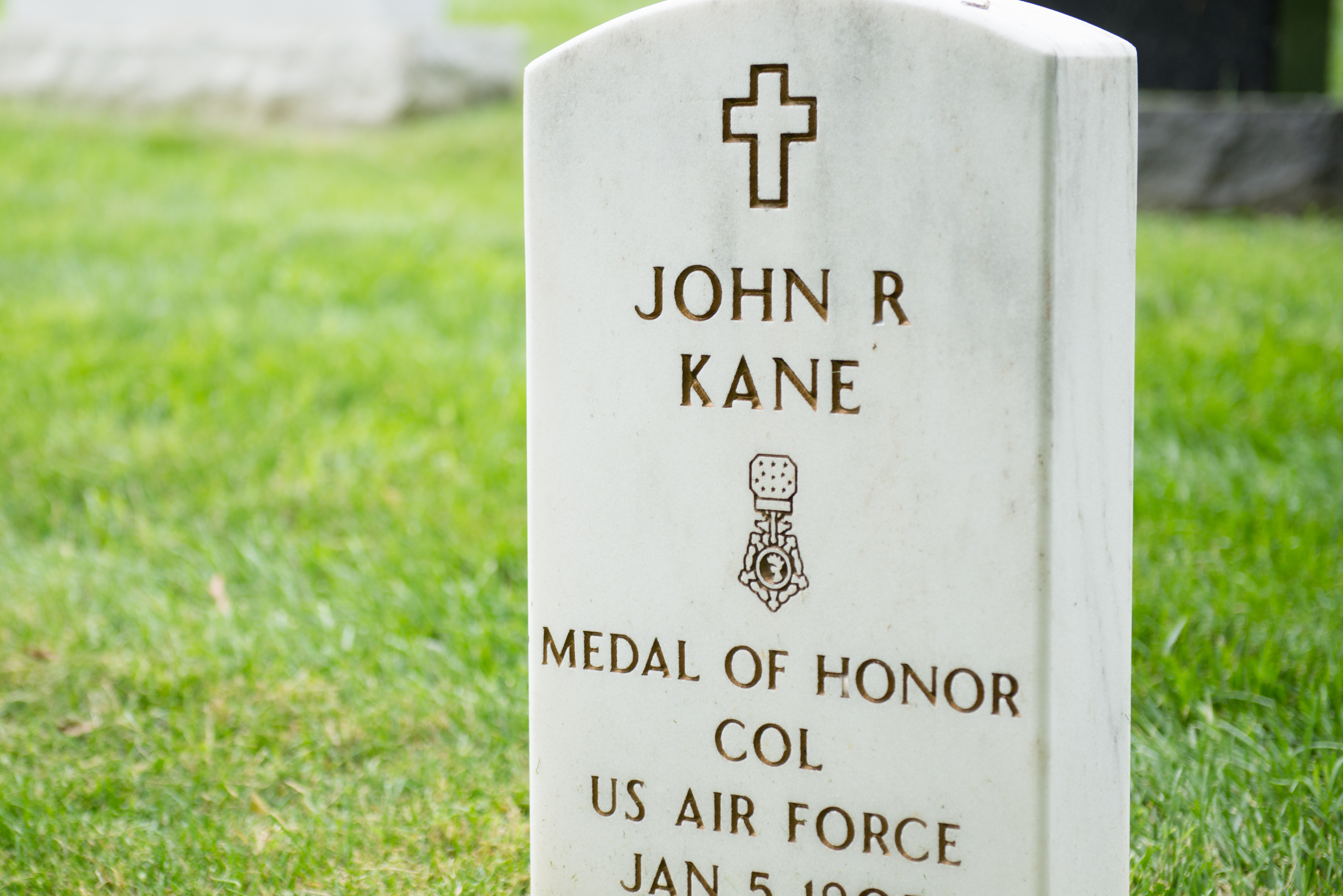
Grave of John R. Kane at Arlington National Cemetery

Kane retired to a farm in Logan County, Arkansas, but moved to Pennsylvania in 1987 to be near his son. He died at age 89 on May 29, 1996, while living at a Veterans Administration nursing home in Pennsylvania. He was buried at Arlington National Cemetery in Virginia weeks later, on June 18.

On February 2, 1998, Barksdale Air Force Base named its B-52 combat crew training school after him. Kane was inducted into the Louisiana Military Hall of Fame in Abbeville, Louisiana, on November 13, 2010. On November 28, 2020, statues honoring Kane and Jack Lummus were unveiled near McLane Stadium on the campus of Baylor University.

== Medal of Honor citation ==
Kane's official Medal of Honor citation reads:

For conspicuous gallantry in action and intrepidity at the risk of his life above and beyond the call of duty on 1 August 1943. On this date he led the third element of heavy bombardment aircraft in a mass low-level bombing attack against the vitally important enemy target of the Ploesti oil refineries. En route to the target, which necessitated a round-trip flight of over 2,400 miles, Col. Kane's element became separated from the leading portion of the massed formation in avoiding dense and dangerous cumulous cloud conditions over mountainous terrain. Rather than turn back from such a vital mission he elected to proceed to his target. Upon arrival at the target area it was discovered that another group had apparently missed its target and had previously attacked and damaged the target assigned to Col. Kane's element. Despite the thoroughly warned defenses, the intensive antiaircraft fire, enemy fighter airplanes, extreme hazards on a low-level attack of exploding delayed action bombs from the previous element, of oil fires and explosions and dense smoke over the target area, Col. Kane elected to lead his formation into the attack. By his gallant courage, brilliant leadership, and superior flying skill, he and the formation under his command successfully attacked this vast refinery so essential to our enemies' war effort. Through his conspicuous gallantry in this most hazardous action against the enemy, and by his intrepidity at the risk of his life above and beyond the call of duty, Col. Kane personally contributed vitally to the success of this daring mission and thereby rendered most distinguished service in the furtherance of the defeat of our enemies.

== Awards and decorations ==

Badge	USAF Command pilot badge		
1st row	Medal of Honor		Silver Star
2nd row	Legion of Merit	Distinguished Flying Cross with oak leaf cluster	Air Medal with four oak leaf clusters
3rd row	Army Commendation Medal	Presidential Unit Citation with oak leaf cluster	American Defense Service Medal with service star
4th row	American Campaign Medal	European–African–Middle Eastern Campaign Medal with one campaign star	World War II Victory Medal
5th row	National Defense Service Medal	Air and Space Longevity Service Award with four oak leaf clusters	Armed Forces Reserve Medal

== See also ==
- List of Medal of Honor recipients for World War II
