= Berca Airfield =

Former airfield in Libya

- Bengazi, Libya
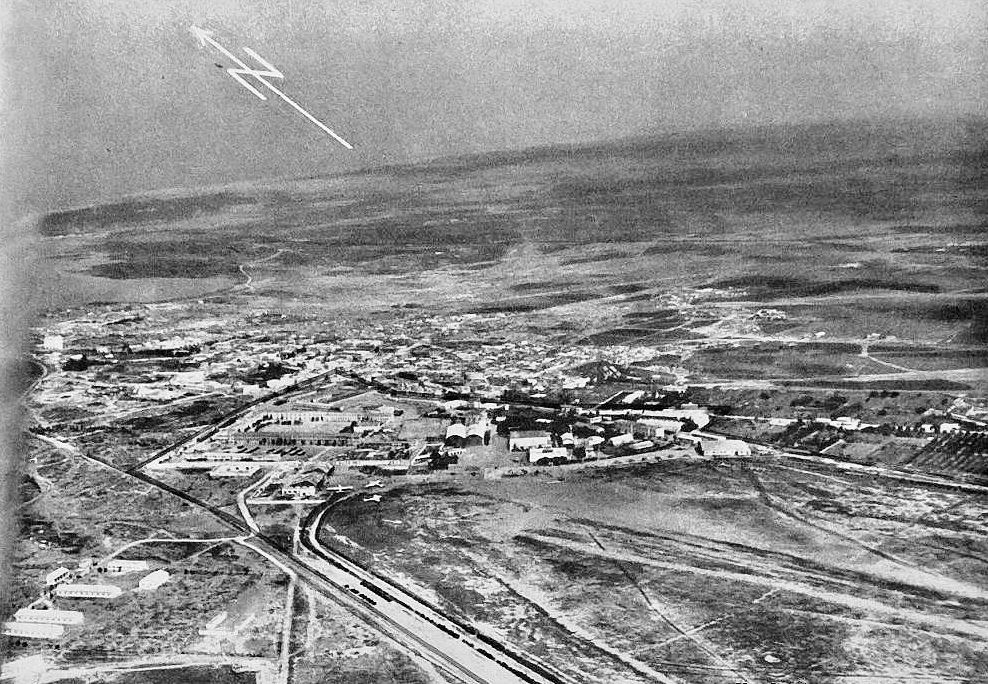
- German Luftwaffe oblique airphoto of Berca Airfield

Site information
- Type: Civil Airport/Military Airfield
- Controlled by: Italian Regia Aeronautica; German Luftwaffe; United States Army Air Forces

Location
- Coordinates: 32°05′29″N 020°04′43″E

Site history
- Built: Before 1940
- In use: 1940-1943

Location of Berca Airfield, Libya

Berca Airfield is a former civil airport and military airfield, located in the Al Birkah suburb of Benghazi, Libya.

The facility appears to be a pre-World War II civil airport which may have also been used by the Italian Regia Aeronautica Air Force. After the Italian invasion of Egypt and the arrival of the German Luftwaffe in 1941, it was used by the Axis as a military airfield.

After the seizure of Bengazi by the British Eighth Army during the Western Desert Campaign in early 1943, it was used by the United States Army Air Force during the North African Campaign by the 98th Bombardment Group, which flew B-24 Liberator heavy bombers from the airfield between 26 March-4 April 1943.

In the 1950s and 1960s Berka II was Detachment 3 (a radar site ) of the 633rd Aircraft Control and Warning Squadron, which had its main site at Wheelus Air Force Base at Tripoli and Detachment 2 at Misurata, both in Libya.

Its subsequent postwar history is unknown, today the area has been rebuilt into part of the urban area of Benghazi.

From about 1960 to 1967 or thereabouts the airstrip was used as a base by World Wide Helicopters Ltd who were flying both small fixed wing aircraft and helicopters in support of oil exploration activity in the desert. Two airfields south of Berca were Berca-2, which had by the 1980s been demolished and Berca-3, which had still existed in the 1980s and was demolished as well. They both had 2 runways.
