= 415th Flight Test Flight =

United States Air Force reserve squadron

415th Flight Test Flight

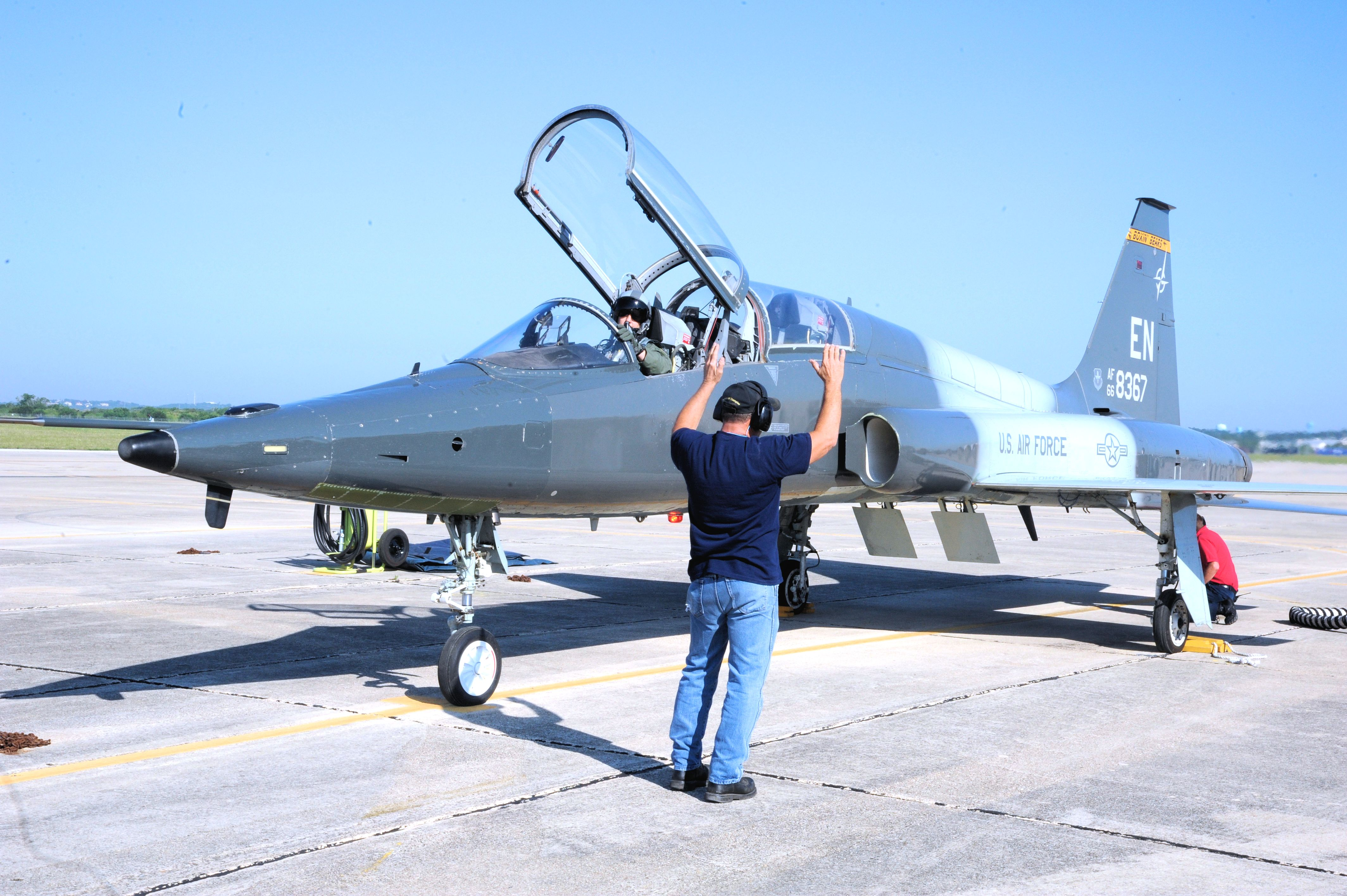
- A maintenance contractor performs final checks to a 415th Flight Test Flight T-38 Talon prior to taking off from Joint Base San Antonio-Randolph. (Note: Aircraft is Northrop T-38-65-NO Talon, serial 66-8367,Baugher, Joe (19 January 2023). "1966 USAF Serial Numbers". Joe Baugher. piloted by the flight commander.)
- Active: 1942–1945; 1958–1962; 1989–1994; 2001–present
- Country: United States
- Branch: United States Air Force
- Role: Flight Test
- Part of: Air Force Reserve Command
- Garrison/HQ: Joint Base San Antonio-Randolph, Texas
- Engagements: Mediterranean Theater of Operations
- Decorations: Distinguished Unit Citation; Air Force Outstanding Unit Award

Insignia
- 415th Flight Test Flight emblem (Note: Approved 1 August 1989.)

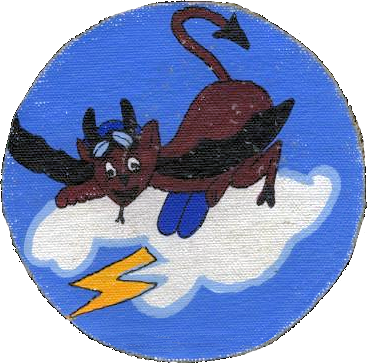
- Unofficial World War II 415th Bombardment Squadron emblem

Aircraft flown
- Trainer: Northrop T-38 Talon

The 415th Flight Test Flight is a United States Air Force reserve unit. It is assigned to the 413th Flight Test Group of Air Force Reserve Command, stationed at Joint Base San Antonio-Randolph, Texas.

The squadron was first activated during World War II as the 25th Reconnaissance Squadron. After redesignation as the 415th Bombardment Squadron, it saw combat in the Mediterranean Theater of Operations, participating in the low level attack on oil refineries near Ploiești, Romania. It earned two Distinguished Unit Citations for its combat operations. After VE Day the squadron returned to the United States and trained with Boeing B-29 Superfortresses until inactivating in Spring 1946.

The squadron was reactivated in 1958 when Strategic Air Command (SAC) reorganized its Boeing B-47 Stratojet wings and placed one third of its bombers on ground alert. It was inactivated in 1962, when SAC's alert status was altered.

In 1994, the squadron was consolidated with the 6515th Test Squadron, which had been performing flight tests on McDonnell Douglas F-15 Eagle aircraft at Edwards Air Force Base, California, since 1989. It was inactivated in 1994, but in 2001 was activated in the reserve to perform flight tests on trainer aircraft.

== Mission ==
The 415th is a small unit, consisting of a handful of test pilots and a cadre of noncommissioned officers. The unit performs flight testing for Northrop T-38 Talon jet trainers at Randolph Air Force Base. The unit performs functional check flights, making sure the aircraft are ready to fly after undergoing modifications and repairs.

The flight tests planes repaired or modified by the 571st Aircraft Maintenance Squadron of the 309th Maintenance Wing, which performs T-38 overhauls at Randolph and handles depot maintenance of all T-38s in the Air Force, as well as some Navy T-38s. Planes are given functional check flights before delivery to the field. Flights last about an hour and certify the aircraft for flight. The tests are performed before the planes are returned to operational service. The flight also ferries T-38s between their bases and the repair depot.

== History ==
=== World War II ===
==== Training in the United States ====
The squadron was first activated as the 25th Reconnaissance Squadron at MacDill Field, Florida as one of the four original squadrons of the 98th Bombardment Group. Since a reorganization of General Headquarters Air Force in September 1936, each bombardment group of the Army Air Forces (AAF) had an assigned or attached reconnaissance squadron, which operated the same aircraft as that group's assigned bombardment squadrons. The 25th soon moved to Barksdale Field, Louisiana, where it began to train as a Consolidated B-24 Liberator squadron under Third Air Force. In April, it was converted to a heavy bomber unit and redesignated the 415th Bombardment Squadron and was assigned, rather than attached to the 98th Bombardment Group.

The squadron's training was short and it deployed to Egypt in July 1942 over the South Atlantic Ferrying Route transiting from Morrison Field, Florida, though the Caribbean Sea to Brazil. It made the Atlantic crossing from Brazil to Liberia, then transited east across central Africa to Sudan. The air echelon of the group reformed with the ground echelon which traveled by the SS Pasteur around the Cape of Good Hope, joining with the air echelon of the squadron and the 345th Bombardment Squadron at RAF Ramat David, in Palestine.

==== Combat in the Middle East ====
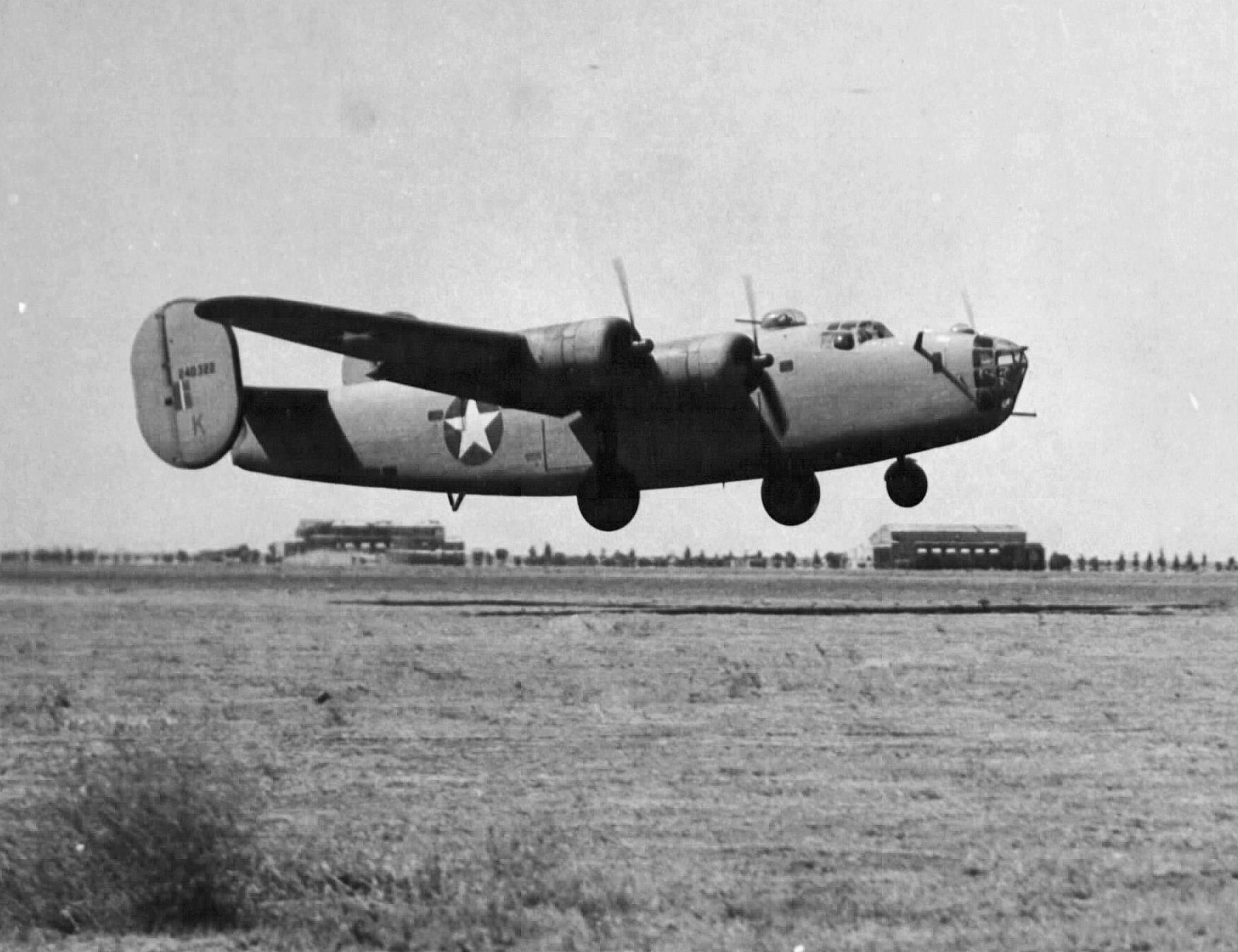
415th Bomb Squadron B-24D (Note: Aircraft is Consolidated B-24D-45-CO Liberator, serial 42-40322 Cornhusker. This plane was shot down over the Ionian Sea west of Cephalonia Island by Bf 109 from IV/JG 27 flown by Hans Flor while returning from 1 August 1943 low-level mission to Ploești, Romania. All 10 crew members were KIA. Missing Air Crew Report 178. Photo taken at Tobruk or Benina Airfield, Libya.)

Upon arrival in the Near East, the squadron became part of United States Army Middle East Air Force, which was replaced by Ninth Air Force in November. It entered combat in August, attacking shipping and harbor installations to cut Axis supply lines to North Africa. It also bombed airfields and rail transit lines in Sicily and mainland Italy. The squadron moved forward with Ninth Air Force to airfields in Egypt; Libya and Tunisia supporting the British Eighth Army in the Western Desert Campaign. Its support of this campaign earned the squadron the Distinguished Unit Citation.

On 1 August 1943, the squadron participated in Operation Tidal Wave, the low-level raid on oil refineries near Ploiești, Romania. Alerted to the vulnerability of the Ploiești refineries by a June 1942 raid by the HALPRO project, the area around Ploiești had become one of the most heavily defended targets in Europe. The squadron pressed its attack on the Asta Romana Refinery through smoke and fire from bombing by another group's earlier attack and heavy flak defenses. The squadron's actions in this engagement earned it a second Distinguished Unit Citation.

When the forces driving East from Egypt and Libya met up with those moving westward from Algeria and Morocco in Tunisia in September 1943, Ninth Air Force was transferred to England to become the tactical air force for the invasion of the European Continent. The squadron, along with all Army Air Forces units in North Africa became part of Twelfth Air Force. In November 1943, the squadron moved to Brindisi Airport, Italy, where it became part of Fifteenth Air Force, which assumed control of strategic operations in the Mediterranean Theater of Operations, while Twelfth became a tactical air force.

==== Strategic operations in Italy ====
The squadron continued strategic bombardment raids on targets in occupied France, southern Germany, Czechoslovakia, Hungary, Austria and targets in the Balkans. These included industrial sites, airfields, harbors and lines of communication. Although focusing on strategic bombing, the squadron was sometimes diverted to tactical operations, supporting Operation Shingle, the landings at Anzio and the Battle of Monte Cassino. In the summer of 1944, the squadron supported Operation Dragoon, the invasion of southern France. The unit also assisted the Soviet advance into the Balkans, and supported Yugoslav Partisans and guerillas in neighboring countries.

==== Return to the United States ====
The squadron returned to the United States in May 1945. Upon arrival it was redesignated as a very heavy Boeing B-29 Superfortress squadron and began training for deployment to the Pacific to join the strategic bombing campaign against Japan. However, very heavy bomber groups were organized with three squadrons, rather than the four of the 98th Group, so in July 1945, the squadron was inactivated and its personnel and equipment were transferred to the other squadrons of the 98th Group.

=== Strategic Air Command ===
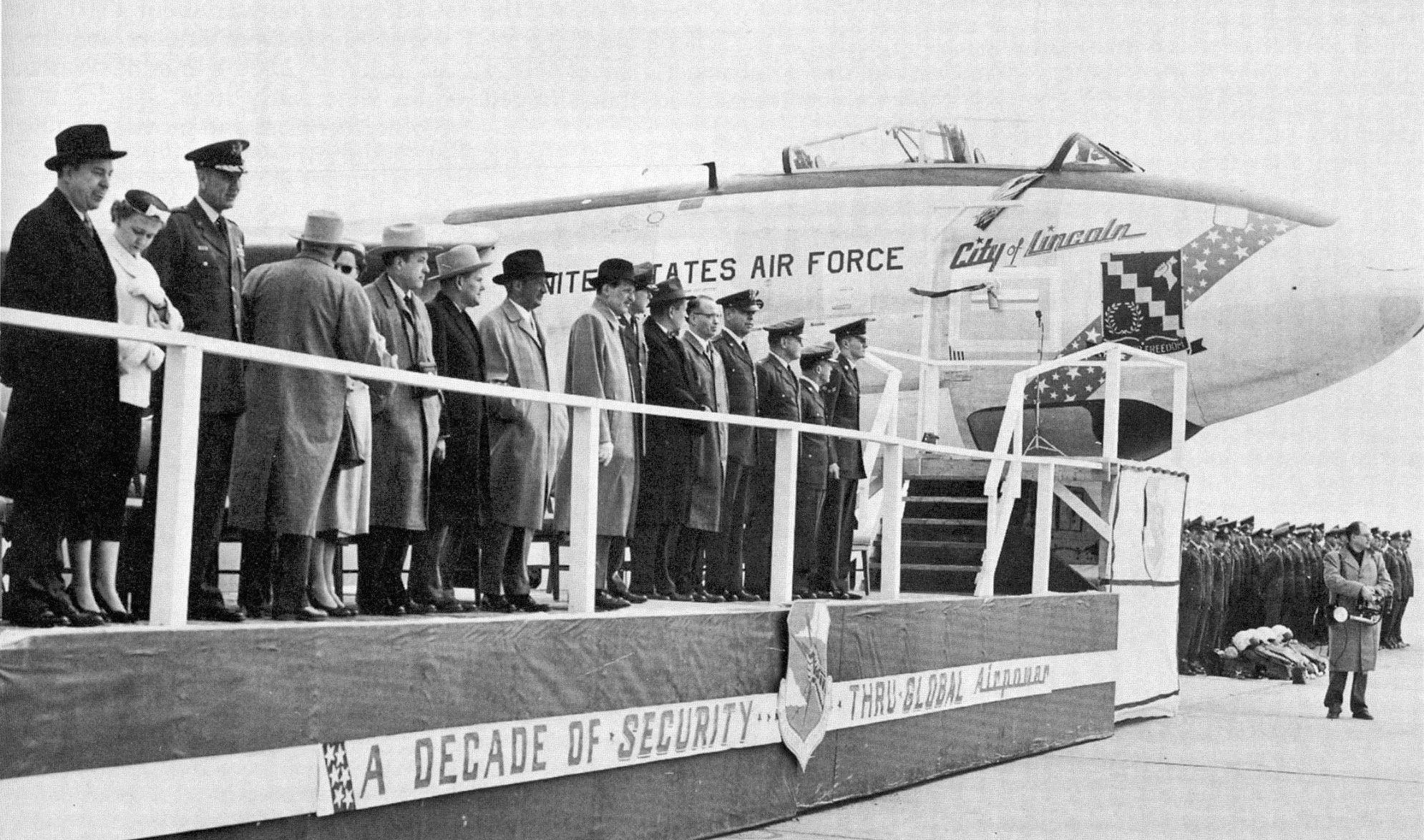
Dedication of first Boeing B-47 at Lincoln AFB

From 1958, the Boeing B-47 Stratojet wings of Strategic Air Command (SAC) began to assume an alert posture at their home bases, reducing the amount of time spent on alert at overseas bases. The SAC alert cycle divided itself into four parts: planning, flying, alert and rest to meet General Thomas S. Power's initial goal of maintaining one third of SAC's planes on fifteen minute ground alert, fully fueled and ready for combat to reduce vulnerability to a Soviet missile strike. To implement this new system B-47 wings reorganized from three to four squadrons. The 415th was activated at Lincoln Air Force Base as the fourth squadron of the 98th Bombardment Wing. The alert commitment was increased to half the wing's aircraft in 1962 and the four squadron pattern no longer met the alert cycle commitment, so the squadron was inactivated on 1 January 1962.

=== Flight test ===
==== Testing modifications for Air Force Systems Command ====
The second predecessor of the flight was activated in March 1989 by Air Force Systems Command at Edwards Air Force Base, California, as the 6515th Test Squadron and assigned to the 6510th Test Wing. The squadron assumed the McDonnell Douglas F-15 Eagle testing mission, evaluating modifications prior to them being implemented for operational aircraft. In 1992, as the Air Force eliminated MAJCON (four-digit) units, the 6515th was consolidated with the 415th as the 415th Test Squadron The squadron was inactivated in 1994 and its testing mission was assumed by the 419th Flight Test Squadron.

==== Functional testing for Air Force Reserve Command ====
The squadron was reactivated as the 415th Flight Test Flight in 2001 as a Northrop T-38 Talon functional check flight organization at Randolph Air Force Base. The squadron participates in a program designed to extend the service life of the Air Force's fleet of T-38C Talon aircraft through the year 2020. In addition to modifying the propulsion system, the program also involves an upgrade to the plane's avionics. This upgrade is designed to improve the training capabilities of the T-38 and provide one configuration for all training roles. Once completed, the program will make it easier for pilot trainees to transition from the T-38 to a front-line fighter or bomber aircraft.

Air Education and Training Command is the lead command responsible for sustainment and modernization of T-38s in the Air Force inventory. The T-38 System Program Office at the Ogden Air Logistics Center at Hill Air Force Base, Utah, provides primary field support for the aircraft and has operational control of the flight, while Air Force Reserve Command maintains administrative control.

== Lineage ==
415th Bombardment Squadron

- Constituted as the 25th Reconnaissance Squadron (Heavy) on 28 January 1942

Activated on 3 February 1942
Redesignated 415th Bombardment Squadron (Heavy) on 22 April 1942
Redesignated 415th Bombardment Squadron, Heavy on 1 July 1943
Inactivated on 3 July 1945
Redesignated 415th Bombardment Squadron, Medium on 11 August 1958
Activated on 1 September 1958
Inactivated and discontinued on 1 January 1962
Consolidated with the 6515th Test Squadron as the 6515th Test Squadron on 1 October 1992

415th Flight Test Flight

- Designated as the 6515th Test Squadron and activated on 10 March 1989

Consolidated with the 415th Bombardment Squadron on 1 October 1992
Redesignated 415th Test Squadron on 2 October 1992
Redesignated 415th Flight Test Squadron on 1 March 1994
Inactivated 1 October 1994
Redesignated 415th Flight Test Flight on 24 September 2001
Activated in the Reserve on 1 October 2001

=== Assignments ===
- 98th Bombardment Group, 3 February 1942 – 3 July 1945
- 98th Bombardment Wing, 1 September 1958 – 1 January 1962
- 6510th Test Wing (later 412th Test Wing), 10 March 1989
- 412th Operations Group, 1 October 1993 – 1 October 1994
- 622d Flight Test Group, 1 October 2001
- 413th Flight Test Group, 1 October 2003 – present

=== Stations ===
- MacDill Field, Florida, 3 February 1942
- Barksdale Field, Louisiana, c. 9 February 1942
- Page Field, Florida, 31 March 1942
- Drane Field, Florida, 15 May-3 July 1942
- RAF Ramat David, Palestine, 31 July 1942
- RAF Fayid, Egypt, 12 November 1942
- Tobruk Airfield, Libya, 26 January 1943
- Benina Airfield, Libya, 11 February 1943
- Hergla Airfield, Tunisia, 26 September 1943
- Brindisi Airport, Italy, 18 November 1943
- Manduria Airfield, Italy, 19 December 1943
- Lecce Airfield, Italy, 18 January 1944 – 19 April 1945
- Fairmont Army Air Field, Nebraska, 8 May-3 July 1945
- Lincoln Air Force Base, Nebraska, 1 September 1958 – 1 January 1962
- Edwards Air Force Base, California, 10 March 1989 – 1 October 1994
- Joint Base San Antonio, Texas, 1 October 2001 – present

=== Aircraft ===
- Consolidated B-24 Liberator, 1942–1945
- Boeing B-47 Stratojet, 1958–1961
- McDonnell Douglas F-15 Eagle, 1989–1994
- Northrop T-38 Talon, 2001–present

=== Awards and campaigns ===
Award streamer	Award	Dates	Notes
	Distinguished Unit Citation	August 1942-17 August 1943	North Africa and Sicily, 415th Bombardment Squadron
	Distinguished Unit Citation	1 August 1943	Ploesti, Romania, 415th Bombardment Squadron
	Air Force Outstanding Unit Award	1 January 2013–31 December 2014	415th Flight Test Flight

Campaign Streamer	Campaign	Dates	Notes
	Air Offensive, Europe	31 July 1942 – 5 June 1944	415th Bombardment Squadron
	Air Combat, EAME Theater	31 July 1942 – 11 May 1945	415th Bombardment Squadron
	Egypt-Libya	31 July 1942 – 12 February 1943	415th Bombardment Squadron
	Tunisia	12 November 1942 – 13 May 1943	415th Bombardment Squadron
	Sicily	14 May 1943 – 17 August 1943	415th Bombardment Squadron
	Naples-Foggia	18 August 1943 – 21 January 1944	415th Bombardment Squadron
	Anzio	22 January 1944 – 24 May 1944	415th Bombardment Squadron
	Rome-Arno	22 January 1944 – 9 September 1944	415th Bombardment Squadron
	Central Europe	22 March 1944 – 21 May 1945	415th Bombardment Squadron
	Normandy	6 June 1944 – 24 July 1944	415th Bombardment Squadron
	Northern France	25 July 1944 – 14 September 1944	415th Bombardment Squadron
	Southern France	15 August 1944 – 14 September 1944	415th Bombardment Squadron
	North Apennines	10 September 1944 – 4 April 1945	415th Bombardment Squadron
	Rhineland	15 September 1944 – 21 March 1945	415th Bombardment Squadron
	Po Valley	3 April 1945 – 8 May 1945	415th Bombardment Squadron

== See also ==
- List of United States Air Force test squadrons
