= 98th Operations Group =

US Air Force unit

98th Operations Group

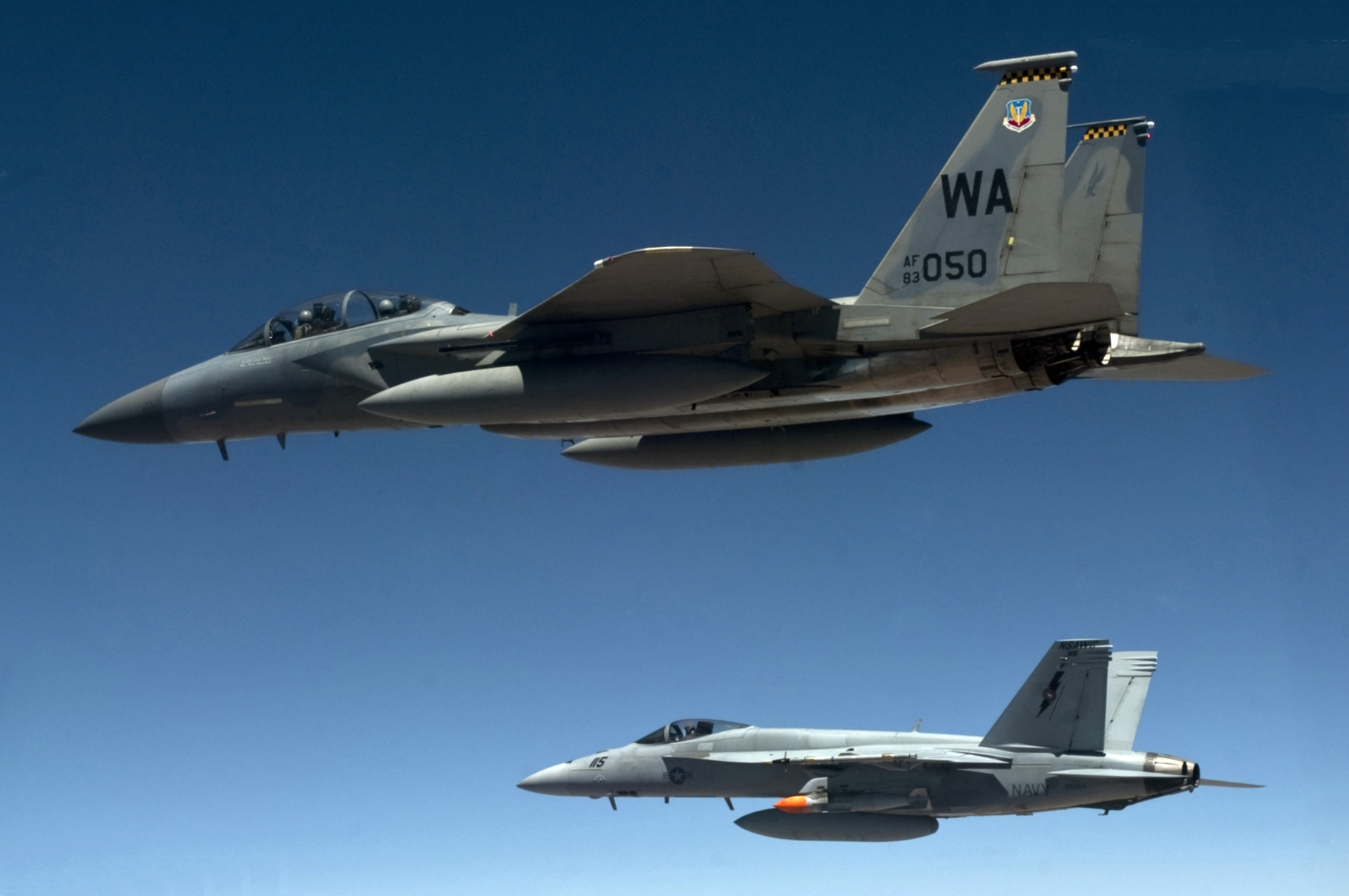
- F-15D and F/A-18E over the Nevada Test Range
- Active: 1942–1945; 1947–1952; 1992–1994; 2001–present
- Country: United States
- Branch: United States Air Force
- Part of: Air Combat Command
- Garrison/HQ: Nellis Air Force Base
- Motto: Force for Freedom
- Engagements: Mediterranean Theater of Operations; Korean War
- Decorations: Distinguished Unit Citation; Republic of Korea Presidential Unit Citation

Insignia
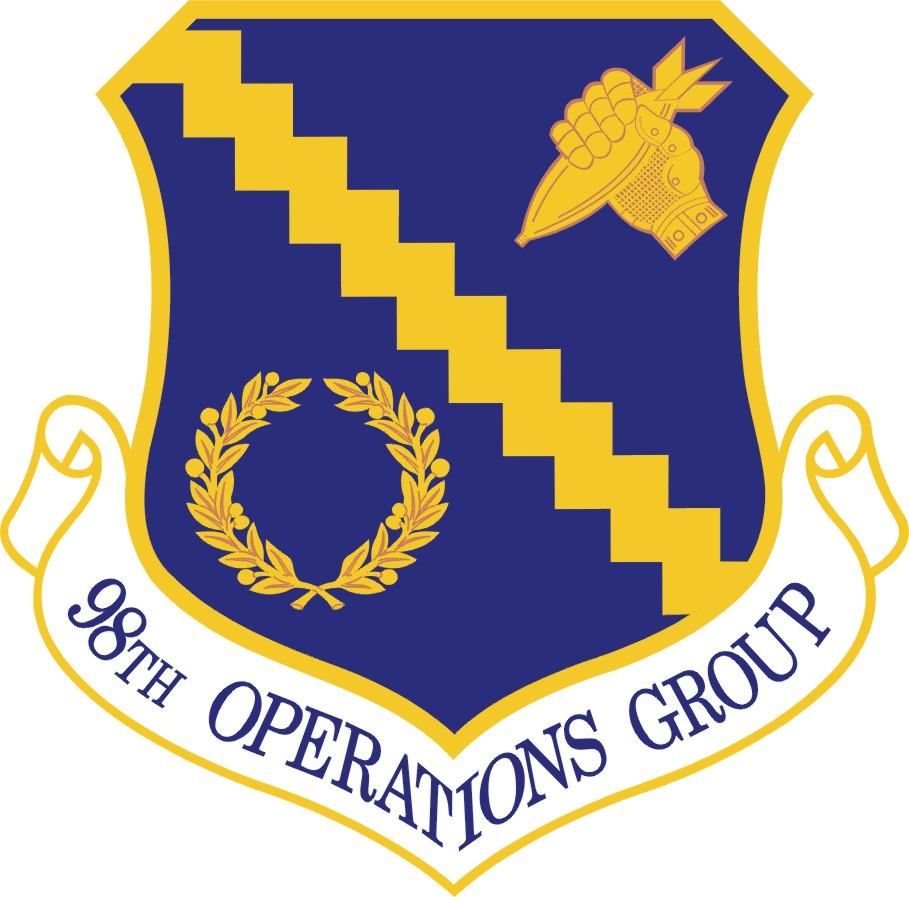
- 98th Operations Group emblem (Note: The group uses the wing emblem with the group designation on the scroll. Air Force Instruction 84-105, Organizational Lineage, Honors and Heraldry, 19 March 2013, para 3.3.3.)

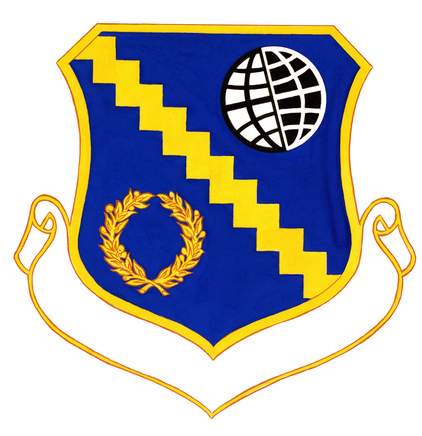
- 98th Air Refueling Group emblem (Note: Approved c. December 1988.)

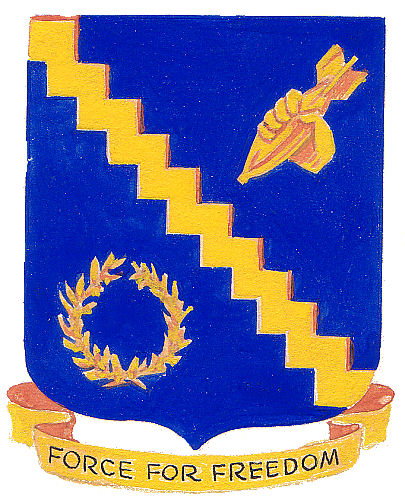
- 98th Bombardment Group emblem (Note: Approved 28 July 1942.)

The 98th Operations Group is a component unit of the Nevada Test and Training Range, assigned to the United States Air Force Air Combat Command. The group is stationed at Nellis Air Force Base, Nevada. It provides day-to-day control of the Nevada Test and Training Range (NTTR) and directly supports Air Force, joint and multi-national test and training activities; and operates two Air Combat Command bombing ranges; the NTTR and Leach Lake Tactics Range, near Barstow, California.

During World War II, the group's predecessor unit, the 98th Bombardment Group was a Consolidated B-24 Liberator heavy bomb group that fought in North Africa and Italy. Two of its members, Colonel John R. (Killer) Kane and First Lieutenant Donald Pucket were awarded the Medal of Honor for their actions in combat. The group flew a total of 417 missions, earning a total of 15 battle streamers as well as two Presidential Unit Citations.

In the postwar era, the 98th Bombardment Group was one of the first United States Army Air Forces units assigned to Strategic Air Command (SAC) on 1 July 1947, prior to the establishment of the USAF. Equipped with low-hour Boeing B-29 Superfortress World War II aircraft, it was deployed to Far East Air Force in 1950 and flew combat missions over North Korea early in the Korean War. The group was inactivated in 1952 when the parent wing adopted the Tri-Deputate organization and assigned all of the group's squadrons directly to the wing. It was reactivated in 1987 as the 98th Air Refueling Group, Heavy; as an Air Force Reserve associate unit of the 434th Air Refueling Wing.

== History ==
=== World War II ===
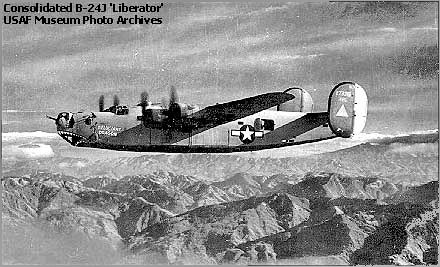
B-24 of the 98th Bombardment Group

The 98th trained for bombardment missions with Consolidated B-24 Liberators during the first half of 1942.

The group was alerted and departed for the Middle East on 15 July 1942, arriving in Palestine in late July 1942. The 98th was initially assigned to the United States Middle East Air Force (USMEAF). However, the USMEAF was dissolved on 12 November 1942. At that time, the 98th came under Ninth Air Force. It flew its first mission to Mersa Matruh, Libya on 1 August 1942, with the aircraft being serviced by Royal Air Force personnel until 98th maintenance personnel arrived in mid-August 1942.

It supported the British Eighth Army in its westward advance from Egypt into Libya and Tunisia. It bombed shipping and harbor installations in North Africa, Sicily, Italy, Crete, and Greece to cut enemy supply lines to Africa and to prepare for the Allied invasion of Italy. The 98th earned a Distinguished Unit Citation (DUC) for action against the enemy in the Middle East, North Africa, and Sicily from August 1942 to August 1943. It received a second DUC for participation in a low-level bombing raid on enemy-held oil refineries at Ploesti, Romania, on 1 August 1943. On this raid, of 47 B-24s launched, only 21 returned safely. One crashed on takeoff with the loss of all crewmembers except two. Six aborted before reaching the target. Seventeen went down in enemy territory. Two went down at sea. The Group Commander, Col. John R. (Killer) Kane was awarded the Medal of Honor for his leadership.

The 98th was under the command of the Twelfth Air Force in September and October 1943. From 1 November 1943 it was under the Fifteenth Air Force and moved to Italy. It flew many long-range missions to France, Germany, Austria, Czechoslovakia, Hungary, and Romania to bomb enemy heavy industries, airdromes, harbors, oil fields, and communication centers. On another raid on Ploesti on 9 July 1944, Lt. Donald Pucket sacrificed his life trying to save three of his crewmembers who could not or would not bail out of their doomed B-24. Donald Pucket was awarded the Medal of Honor posthumously for his sacrifice.

In the summer of 1944, the 98th participated in the invasion of southern France, assisted in the Soviet advance into the Balkans, and supported the partisans and guerrillas in Yugoslavia and neighboring countries. It flew a total of 417 missions and earned a total of 15 battle streamers as well as two Presidential Unit Citations.

The group returned to the United States as the war was ending in Europe, where it trained in preparation for movement to the Pacific Theater. It was re-designated the 98th Bombardment Group, Very Heavy and equipped with Boeing B-29 Superfortresses, but the war with Japan ended before redeployment.

The 98th was inactivated as a group on 10 November 1945. However, its 343rd, 344th, and 345th Squadrons were reassigned to other B-29 groups. The 343d Squadron was assigned to the 40th Bombardment Group at March Air Force Base, California and inactivated on 27 November 1946. The 344th was assigned to the 444th Bombardment Group at Davis-Monthan Field, Arizona and inactivated on 1 October 1946. The 345th was assigned to the 462nd Bombardment Group at MacDill Field, Florida and inactivated on 31 March 1946.

=== Postwar era and Korean War ===
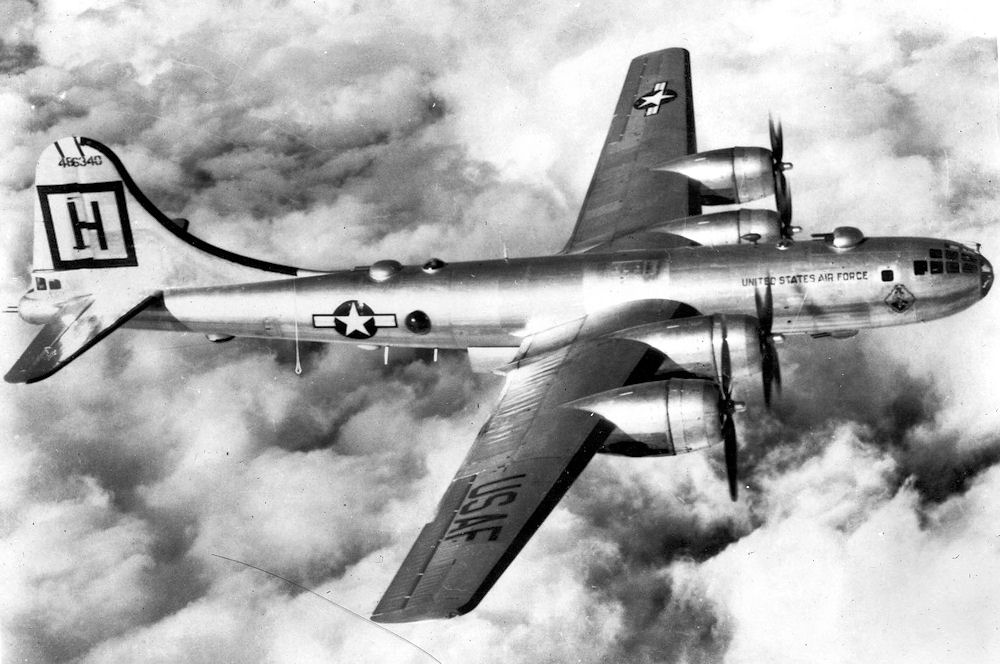
Martin-Omaha B-29-50-MO Superfortress 44-86340, 98th Bomb Group

The 98th was reactivated on 1 July 1947 and equipped with B-29 Superfortresses at Spokane Army Air Field, Washington. In 1948, it carried out a 90-day deployment to Kadena Air Base, Okinawa. During this period, the 98th lost two B-29s; and a Douglas C-54 Skymaster returning to the US with 98th personnel ditched in the Pacific. Another 90-day deployment was conducted in the summer of 1949 to RAF Sculthorpe, England. During the training phase of the years 1947–1950, the 98th recorded six B-29 losses.

During the deployment to England, the 98th practiced high level (35,000 ft) bombing missions on the German Island of Helgoland. The aircraft were challenged by RAF and USAF fighters. The gunners were evaluated on gun camera film. The bombardiers were rated on their performance as well as were other air crew members. As a result of the exercise, the 98th was rated very highly and combat ready.

In early 1950, the 98th was alerted for permanent change of stations to Ramey Air Force Base, Puerto Rico. However, before the move was completed, the Korean War broke out and the 98th arrived at Yokota Air Base, Japan in the first week of August 1950, and was placed under the operational control of the Far East Air Forces Bomber Command (Provisional). The first planes arrived at Yokota on 5 August 1950.

It flew its first combat mission on 7 August, striking marshalling yards at Pyongyang, capital of North Korea. The Group attacked enemy communication lines and supported United Nations ground forces during the war. Targets included rail facilities, oil centers, bridges, roads, troop concentrations, airfields, and military installations. There were 34 known losses.

It became an administrative unit in 1951 when its operational squadrons were assigned directly to the wing as a result of the SAC dual deputate reorganization.

=== Reserve refueling operations ===
The unit was reactivated in the Air Force Reserve on 1 October 1987 as the 98th Air Refueling Group, Heavy at Barksdale Air Force Base, Louisiana with McDonnell Douglas KC-10 Extender aircraft. It consisted of the 78th Air Refueling Squadron and the 98th Consolidated Maintenance Squadron under the command of the 452d Air Refueling Wing at March Air Force Base.

On 12–14 May 1989, the group was tasked to support USAF transport aircraft airlifting troops into Panama, which was the prelude to Operation Just Cause. In early August 1990 aircraft and crews of the 98th again were called on to support operations in the Gulf War. Following that operation, the 98th was involved with President Bush's code name Sinbad, a secret plan to monitor drug trafficking in South America.

Yet again the 98th flew mercy missions into Mogadishu, Somalia delivering 491,610 pounds of supplies to try to alleviate the humanitarian disaster. Still operating in Operation Southern Watch the group flew missions along the southern border of Iraq in January 1993 until inactivated on 30 September 1994.

=== Nevada range ===
It was redesignated the 98th Operations Group and reactivated in October 2001, supporting the 98th Range Wing in its operations at Nellis Air Force Base, Nevada. It is now a non-flying unit that commands two squadrons with 55 military and civil service personnel and has functional responsibility for approximately 300 contract personnel.

It prioritizes and schedules all range activities for all range users, provides ground control intercept operations, flight-following safety deconfliction, simulated threat command and control operations, communications, data link operations, and range access control. It also assists test customers by coordinating support activities, and coordinates airspace issues with military and federal agencies.

The 98th Operations Support Squadron is the scheduling, command and control and project support authority for NTTR operations. The Weapons and Tactics Flight provides qualified ground control intercept and Link 16 operations for more than 5,000 test and training sorties per year on the NTTR. The Current Operations Flight is responsible for range scheduling, range monitoring and advisory control (Blackjack), and provides a comprehensive debrief tool for combat air forces aircrews. The Operations Plans Flight coordinates all exercise, test and experimentation customer assistance.

The 98th Range Squadron is responsible for technical support of NTTR Air Force, joint and multinational aircrew training. The Communications Flight provides small computer hardware and software support and all communications. The Operations and Maintenance Flight provides operation, maintenance and deployment of threat systems, mission control and debriefing systems, time-space-position indicator/scoring systems and Roulette (Red Forces Command and Control). The Engineering Flight conducts research, engineers, develops and manages hardware and software projects.

== Lineage ==
- Established as the 98th Bombardment Group (Heavy) on 28 January 1942

Activated on 3 February 1942
Redesignated: 98th Bombardment Group, Heavy on 1 July 1943
Redesignated: 98th Bombardment Group, Very Heavy on 12 July 1945
Inactivated on 10 November 1945

- Activated on 1 July 1947

Redesignated 98th Bombardment Group, Medium on 12 July 1948
Inactivated on 16 June 1952

- Redesignated 98th Air Refueling Group, Heavy on 12 May 1987

Activated in the reserve on 1 October 1987
Redesignated: 98th Air Refueling Group on 1 February 1992
Inactivated on 30 September 1994

- Redesignated: 98th Operations Group on 21 September 2001

Activated on 29 October 2001

=== Assignments ===
- Third Air Force, 3 February 1942
- US Army Middle East Air Force, c. 25 July 1942
- Ninth Air Force, 12 November 1942
- Twelfth Air Force, 13 September 1943
- XII Bomber Command, 19 September 1943
- 47th Bombardment Wing, 24 September 1943
- 5th Bombardment Wing, 1 November 1943
- 47th Bombardment Wing, 17 November 1943
- Second Air Force, c. 29 April – 10 November 1945
- Strategic Air Command, 1 July 1947
- Fifteenth Air Force, 24 September 1947
- 98th Bombardment Wing, 10 November 1947 – 16 June 1952 (attached to 92d Bombardment Wing, 10 November 1947 – 24 August 1948, 10 December 1948 – 16 May 1949, 18 August 1949 – 15 April 1950; 32d Composite Wing, c. 25 August – 10 December 1948; 3d Air Division, 17 May – 17 August 1949; Far East Air Forces Bomber Command [Provisional], 7 August 1950 – 31 March 1951)
- 434th Air Refueling Wing, 1 October 1987
- 452d Air Refueling Wing, 1 August 1992
- 514th Airlift Wing, 1 October 1993 – 30 September 1994
- 98th Range Wing (later Nevada Test and Training Range), 29 October 2001 – present

=== Components ===
- 25th Reconnaissance Squadron (later 415th Bombardment Squadron): 3 February 1942 – 3 July 1945
- 78th Air Refueling Squadron: 1 October 1987 – 1 August 1992
- 98th Air Refueling Squadron: 16 August 1950 – 16 June 1952 (attached to 98th Bombardment Wing)
- 98th Operations Support Squadron (circa 2017)
- 98th Range Squadron (circa 2017)
- 343d Bombardment Squadron: 3 February 1942 – 10 November 1945; 1 July 1947 – 16 June 1952 (attached to 98th Bombardment Wing after c. 1 April 1951)
- 344th Bombardment Squadron: 3 February 1942 – 10 November 1945; 1 July 1947 – 16 June 1952 (attached to 98th Bombardment Wing after c. 1 April 1951)
- 345th Bombardment Squadron: 3 February 1942 – 10 November 1945; 1 July 1947 – 16 June 1952 (attached to 98th Bombardment Wing after c. 1 April 1951)

=== Stations ===
- MacDill Field, Florida, 3 February 1942
- Barksdale Field, Louisiana, 9 February 1942
- Fort Myers Army Air Field, Florida, 30 March 1942
- Drane Field, Florida, 17 May– July 1942
- RAF Ramat David, Palestine, 25 July 1942 (air echelon), 21 August 1942 (ground echelon)
- RAF Fayid, Egypt, c. 11 November 1942
- Baheira Airfield, Libya, 29 January 1943
- Benina Airfield, Libya, c. 14 February – 26 March 1943; 4 Ap4 – 25 September 1943
- Berca Airfield, Libya, 26 March – 4 April 1943
- Hergla Airfield, Tunisia, c. 25 September 1943
- Brindisi Airfield, Italy, c. 22 November 1943
- Manduria Airfield, Italy, 19 December 1943
- Lecce Airfield, Italy, 17 January 1944 – 19 April 1945
- Fairmont Army Air Field, Nebraska, 8 May 1945
- McCook Army Air Field, Nebraska, 25 June – 10 November 1945
- Andrews Field, Maryland, 1 July 1947
- Spokane Army Air Field (later Spokane Air Force Base, Fairchild Air Force Base), Washington, 24 September 1947 – 16 June 1952

Deployed to Kadena Air Base, Okinawa, c. 25 August – 10 December 1948
Deployed to RAF Sculthorpe, England, 17 May – 17 August 1949
Deployed to Yokota Air Base, Japan, c. 5 August 1950 – 16 June 1952

- Barksdale Air Force Base, Louisiana, 1 October 1987 – 30 September 1994
- Nellis Air Force Base, Nevada, 29 October 2001 – present

=== Aircraft ===
- Consolidated B-24 Liberator, 1942–1945
- Boeing B-29 Superfortress, 1945; 1947–1953
- McDonnell Douglas KC-10 Extender, 1987–1994.
