= Kenneth R. Powell =

United States Air Force general

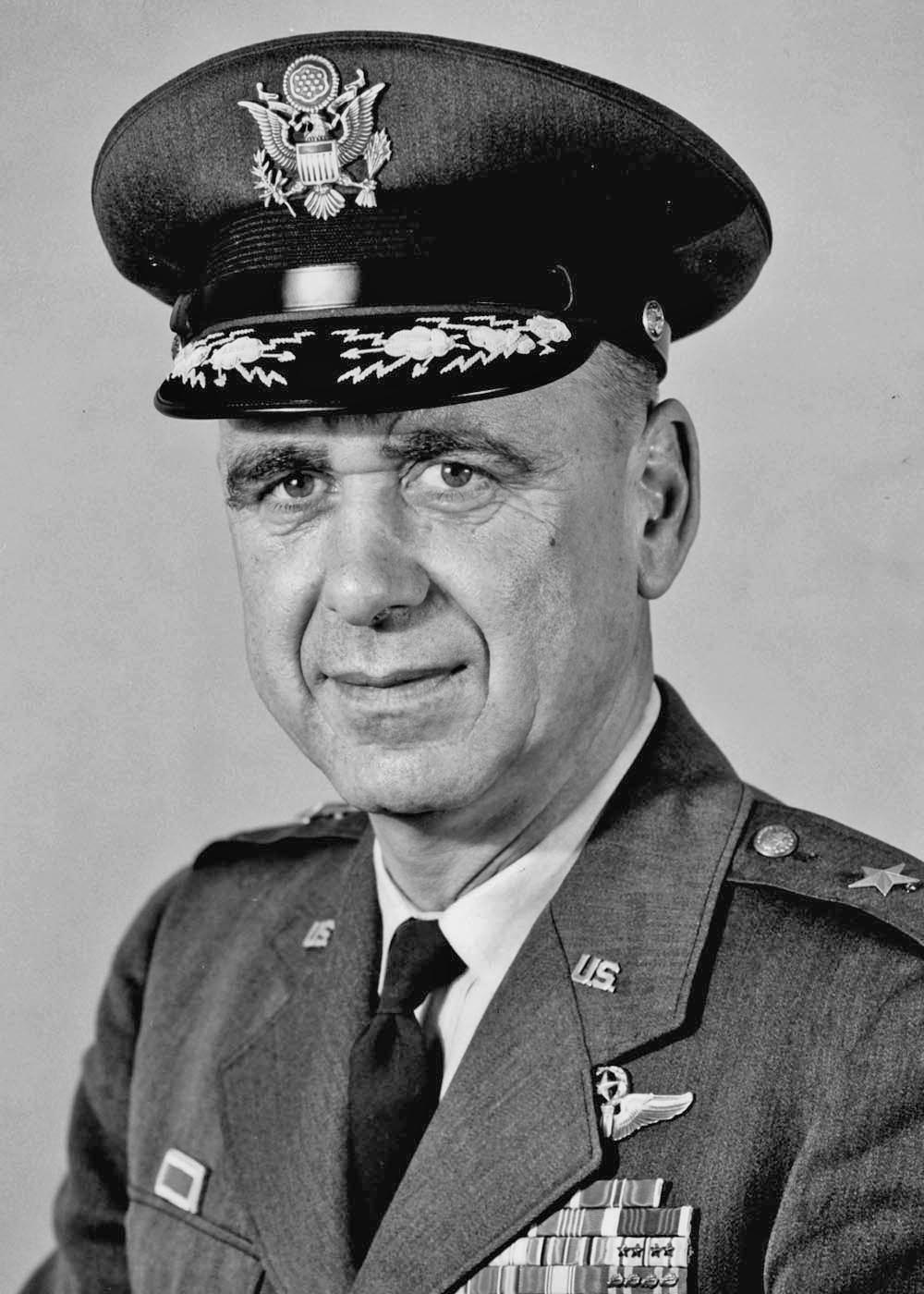
General Kenneth R. Powell, 46th Fighter Pursuit Squadron Commander, 1942-43

Kenneth R. Powell (1915 – September 16, 1987) was a Major General of the United States Air Force.

== Early life ==
Kenneth R. Powell was born in 1915 on a small farm in McMinnville, before moving to Bozeman, Montana after a short stay in Oregon. In 1921, his family moved to Tacoma, Washington. He graduated from Stadium High School in 1934. On the fall of 1934, he entered the Washington State University. He was a varsity letterman in track and field, a Reserve Officers Training Corps cadet, and was a member of the Scabbard and Blade, Crimson Circle, national senior men's honorary society, and Phi Delta Theta fraternity. He graduated on June 6, 1938, with a Bachelor of Arts degree in Sociology and Psychology with a reserve commission as a second lieutenant.

== Military service ==
=== Education ===
- Bachelor of Arts degree in Sociology and Psychology, graduated June 6, 1938.
- Flight School, Kelly Field, graduated July 1940.
- United States Army Command and General Staff College, Fort Leavenworth, graduated July 1945.
- Royal Air Force Staff College, Bracknell, England, graduated May 1947.
- Air War College, graduated 1952.

=== World War II ===
==== Pearl Harbor ====
During Pearl Harbor, Lieutenant Powell was a flight leader assigned to the United States Army Air Corps, 78th Pursuit Squadron at Wheeler Field in Hawaii. During the Japanese attack, all of his unit's aircraft were either damaged or destroyed. As a result, none of the members from his squadron were able to go airborne.

==== Central Pacific ====
By 1942, Powell had been put in command of the 46th Fighter Squadron on Canton Island. He was promoted to lieutenant colonel in 1943 and was appointed as the deputy commander of the 15th Fighter Group. On April 21, 1944, Colonel Powell organized and activated the 21st Fighter Group. This wing was set up to provide fighter protection for bombing raids against Japan. In February 1945, the 21st Fighter Group was directly resubordinated under the VII Fighter Command and was transported by ship to Iwo Jima, arriving at Central Field on March 25, 1945.

On the morning of February 26, 1945, the elements of the 21st Fighter Group were attacked by Imperial Japanese Army soldiers on the ground. Fighting alongside a contingent of U.S. Marines, the airmen killed 250 Japanese soldiers in tent-to-tent fighting, with fourteen airmen from the 21st Fighter Group killed and 50 wounded, including Colonel Powell. He was evacuated to a military hospital on Guam. He returned to his post as soon as he recovered from his injuries. After returning, he participated in several escort missions over Japan. His wing was awarded the Presidential Unit Citation for their escort work of land-based fighters over the Japanese homeland.

=== Post War Service ===
Between 1947 and 1949, Colonel Powell was the commander of the Air Force Public Relations School, where he organized and supervised the Comptroller Course for the Air Force Special Staff School located at Craig Field in Alabama. From 1949 to 1951, Powell was the deputy commandant of the Armed Forces Information School in New York. In 1951, he was appointed as Chief of the Airmen's Assignment Division in the Directorate of Military Personnel at the United States Air Force headquarters.

Between July 1955 and July 1959, Colonel Powell commanded the 10th Tactical Reconnaissance Wing at Spangdahlem Air Base, Germany. While in Germany, he was awarded the Honor Shield of the German State of Rhineland-Pfalz for his work promoting German-American relations. Powell was the first American military commander to receive the Honor Shield. The grand duchess of Luxembourg awarded Colonel Powell the Officer's Cross in the Order of LA Couronne de Chene, the country's highest decoration for foreign officers.

In 1959, Colonel Powell received the Legion of Merit from the United States Armed Forces. After Powell returned from Europe, he was assigned as the commander of the 1st Strategic Aerospace Division at Vandenberg Air Force Base in California.

=== Assignments ===
Sources:

- 15th Infantry, Fort Lewis, Washington, 1938
- 78th Pursuit Squadron, Wheeler Field, Territory of Hawaii
- 46th Fighter Squadron, Canton Island
- 15th Fighter Group
- 21st Fighter Group, June 15, 1944 – October 10, 1946
- Dover Air Base, Delaware, Commander, 1946
- Air Show Unit, Tactical Air Command, Langley Field, Virginia, 1946
- Spangdahlem Air Base, Germany, July 1955 - July 1959
- Vandenberg Air Force Base, California, 1961
- Commander, 819th Strategic Aerospace Division, Dyess Air Force Base, Texas, 14 May 1964 - 2 July 1966

=== Rank History ===
Sources:

- Second Lieutenant, June 6, 1938
- Lieutenant, 1940
- Captain, between 1940 and 1942
- Major, 1942
- Lieutenant Colonel, 1943
- Colonel, between April 21, 1944, and March 1961
- Brigadier General, March 1961
- Major General, between March 1961 and May 14, 1964
