= Donavon F. Smith =

U.S. Air Force lieutenant general

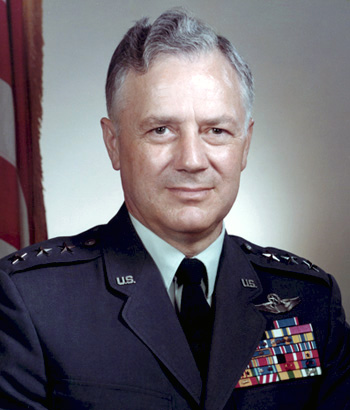
- Born: October 2, 1922; Dowagiac, Michigan, U.S.
- Died: September 10, 1974 (aged 51); Bexar County, Texas, U.S.
- Burial place: United States Air Force Academy Cemetery
- Military career
- Allegiance: United States
- Branch: United States Air Force
- Service years: 1942–1973
- Rank: Lieutenant general
- Nicknames: "Don", "Dieppe"
- Unit: 56th Fighter Group
- Commands: 61st Fighter Squadron; No. 1 Squadron RAF; 63rd Fighter Interceptor Squadron; 76th Air Base Squadron; 518th Air Defense Group; 21st Fighter Bomber Group; 325th Fighter Wing; Ninth Air Force; Nineteenth Air Force; Alaskan Air Command; Sixth Allied Tactical Air Force
- Conflicts: World War II; Vietnam War
- Awards: Distinguished Service Cross; Air Force Distinguished Service Medal (2); Legion of Merit; Distinguished Flying Cross (4); Air Medal (9)

Donavon Francis Smith (October 2, 1922 – September 10, 1974) was a United States Air Force lieutenant general. During World War II, he was a flying ace, credited with 5.5 aerial victories. After World War II, Smith served as commander of the 21st Fighter Bomber Group in France, chief of the Air Force Advisory Group in South Vietnam and commander of the Sixth Allied Tactical Air Force in Turkey. He also served in key strategic and operational positions within the Air Defense Command and at Headquarters of the United States Air Force during the Cold War. He retired from the Air Force on November 1, 1973.

== Early life ==
Smith was born on October 2, 1922, in Dowagiac, Michigan. He graduated from Niles High School in Niles, Michigan, in 1940.

== World War II ==
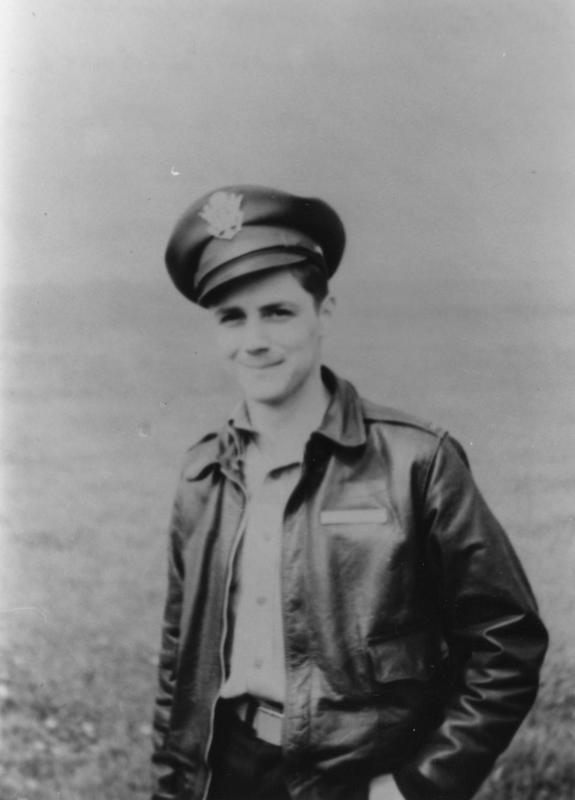
Smith during World War II

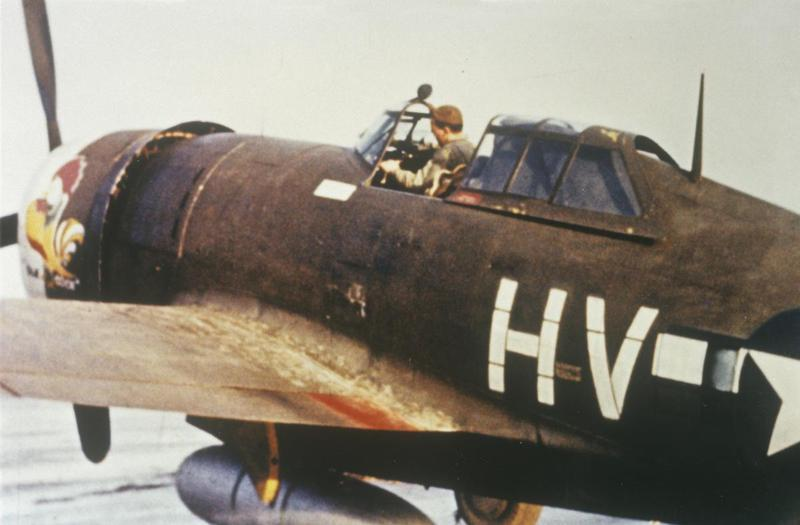
P-47 Thunderbolt "Ole Cock II"

He entered the aviation cadet program in January 1942 and commenced his primary training at Bruce Field, Texas on March 30, 1942; he soloed the Fairchild PT-19 after seven hours and 16 minutes of instruction. He later moved to Randolph Field, Texas, for basic training and advanced training at Foster Field, Texas. Smith was awarded his pilot wings on October 9, 1942. After completing P-47 Thunderbolt training, Smith joined the 61st Fighter Squadron of the 56th Fighter Group at Bridgeport, Connecticut, in November 1942.

He was deployed with the group to England in January 1943. Arriving at RAF Kings Cliffe in January 1943, he flew his first mission from RAF Horsham St. Faith on May 4. In July 1943, the group moved to RAF Halesworth. On July 30, 1943, while escorting B-17 Flying Fortresses over Emden, Germany, Smith was credited with a probable destruction of a Messerschmitt Bf 109. On December 11, he was escorting bombers to the heavily defended area in Emden when his flight was attacked by Messerschmitt Bf 110s. Engaging five of them, he shot down two and damaged one. He was also credited with a shared destruction of a Focke-Wulf Fw 190. For his heroism, Smith received the Distinguished Service Cross.

He shot down two Bf 110s over Steinhude Lake on February 20, 1944, and two days later became a flying ace when he shot down a Fw 190 over Lippstadt. In April 1944, Smith finished his operational tour, then took 30 days of shore leave. In July 1944, he returned for a second tour with the 56th Fighter Group, which was equipped with the new "bubbletop" P-47s and was stationed at RAF Boxted. He was appointed as commander of the 61st Fighter Squadron in September 1944. He flew his 124th and final combat mission with the 56th FG on January 5, 1945.

During World War II, Smith was credited with the destruction of 5.5 enemy aircraft in aerial combat plus 1 probable, 2 damaged, and 2 destroyed on the ground while strafing enemy airfields. While serving with the 56th FG, he flew P-47s bearing the names "P J & Hun Hunter", "Ole Cock II" and "Ole Cock III". He earned the nickname "Dieppe" for skillfully evading enemy anti-aircraft fire while flying over the French port city.

== United States Air Force career ==
Smith returned to the United States in March 1945 and was assigned as project officer in the Tactics Division, Army Air Forces Board, at Orlando Army Air Field in Florida. In November 1945, he was transferred to Headquarters Army Air Forces in Washington, D.C., as an air staff officer in Intelligence. In May 1946, he was assigned to the Strategic Air Command at Selfridge Field in Michigan, where he rejoined the 56th Fighter Group as commander of the 61st Fighter Squadron. He then served as operations officer for the 56th Fighter Group and later as chief of supply for the 56th Fighter Wing. In 1948, he participated as operations officer in the first overseas deployment of jet fighter aircraft from Selfridge Air Force Base to West Germany and back. He served as the U.S. Air Force/Royal Air Force exchange officer from August 1949 to September 1950 and commanded No. 1 Squadron RAF at Tangmere, England. From October 1950 to July 1956, he served with the Air Defense Command in various roles including inspector general for the 56th Fighter Interceptor Group at Selfridge Air Force Base, commander of the 63rd Fighter Interceptor Squadron at Wurtsmith Air Force Base in Michigan, commander of the 518th Air Defense Group at Niagara Falls Air Force Base in New York, and director of military personnel at Headquarters Air Defense Command in Ent Air Force Base in Colorado.

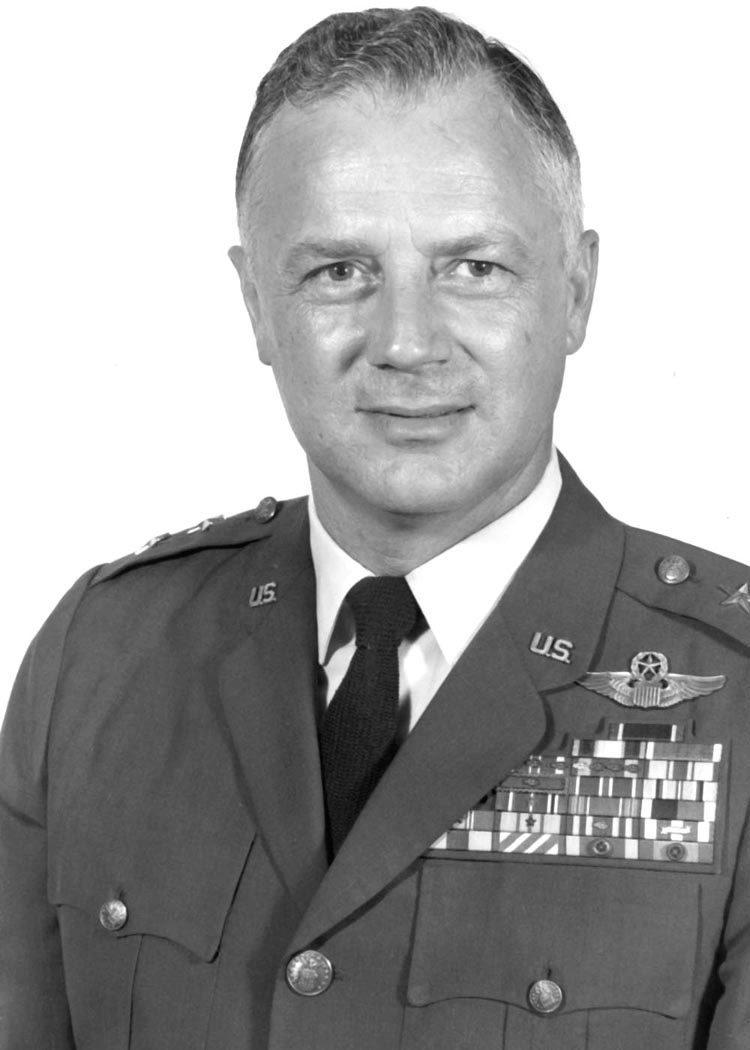
LTG Donavon F. Smith

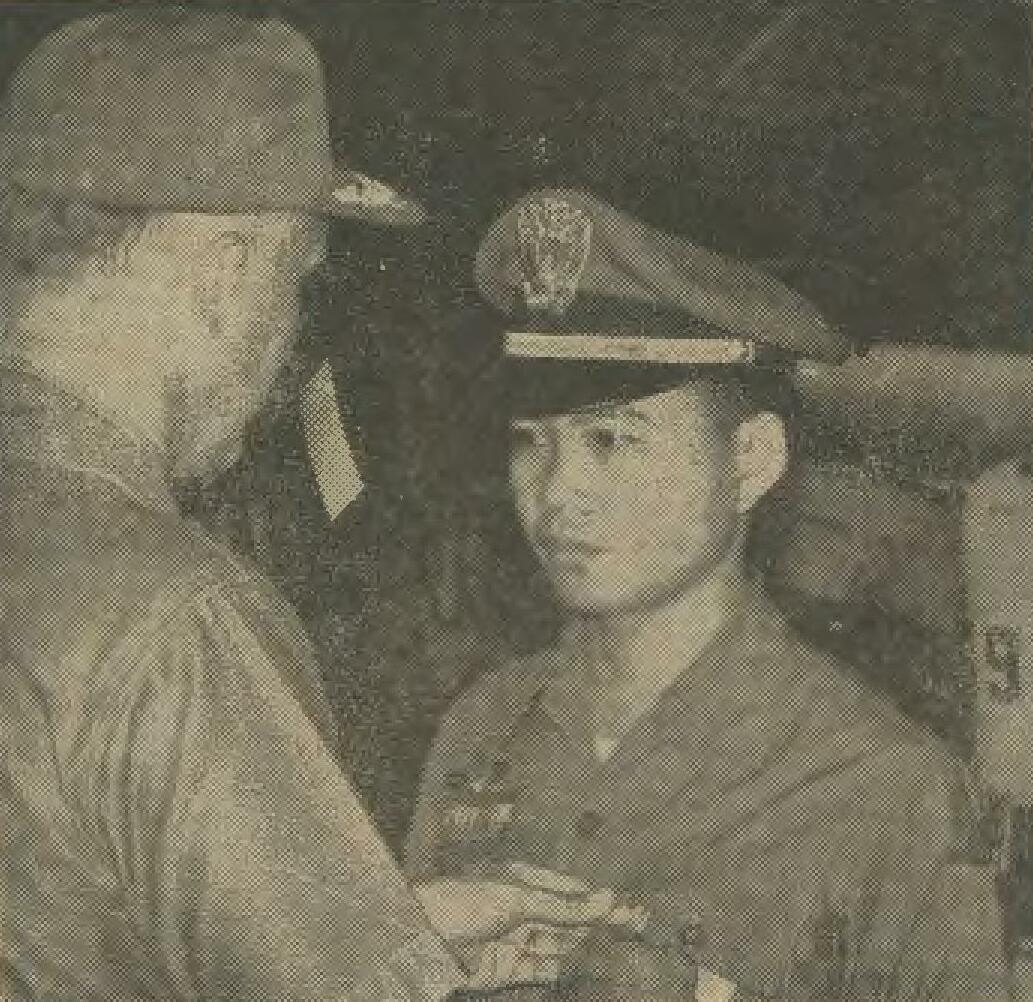
Brigadier General Smith awards a Silver Star to Captain Thai Van De of the Republic of Vietnam Air Force (1967)

In July 1956, Smith returned to Europe as commander of the 21st Fighter Bomber Group at Chambley-Bussières Air Base in France. In December 1957, he was assigned to Supreme Headquarters Allied Powers Europe in Paris, France, as chief of the Atomic Operations Section of the Air Atomic Operations Division (Joint Staff). Smith returned to the United States in July 1960 and was reassigned to the Air Defense Command at McChord Air Force Base in Washington, as director of North American Air Defense Command Operations at Headquarters 25th NORAD Region and later as commander of the 325th Fighter Interceptor Wing. In August 1962, he entered the National War College at Fort McNair in Washington, D.C and graduated in June 1963. He was next assigned to Headquarters U.S. Air Force as chief of the Air Defense Division in the Directorate of Operational Requirements and deputy chief of staff for Programs and Requirements. From February to May 1966, he attended the Advanced Management School at Harvard University and then returned to Headquarters U.S. Air Force as deputy director of strategic and defense forces in the Directorate of Operational Requirements and Development Plans.

In October 1966, Smith was named chief of the Air Force Advisory Group of the Military Assistance Command, Vietnam, serving the next 18 months as chief adviser to the Republic of Vietnam Air Force during the Vietnam War. In May 1968, he returned to the United States as vice commander of the Ninth Air Force at Shaw Air Force Base in South Carolina, and assumed duties as commander of the Nineteenth Air Force at Seymour Johnson Air Force Base in North Carolina, in August 1969. Smith returned to Headquarters U.S. Air Force in February 1970, assuming duties as director of operational requirements and development plans, and in April 1971 became assistant deputy chief of staff for Plans and Operations. In August 1972, he was appointed commander of the Alaskan Air Command, with additional duties as vice commander of the Alaskan North American Air Defense Command and Continental Air Defense Command Region, headquartered at Elmendorf Air Force Base in Alaska. His final assignment was as commander of the Sixth Allied Tactical Air Force in İzmir, Turkey, from June 1973 until his retirement from the Air Force on November 1, 1973.

== Later life ==
Smith died of brain cancer on September 10, 1974, in Bexar County, Texas, at the age of 51, and was buried with military honors at the United States Air Force Academy Cemetery in Colorado Springs, Colorado. In his honor, the city of Niles, Michigan, renamed its Veterans' Memorial Park to Donavon Smith Memorial Park in 1980. In 2012, he was posthumously enshrined in the Michigan Aviation Hall of Fame.

== Aerial victory credits ==
Date	#	Type	Location	Aircraft flown	Unit Assigned
December 11, 1943	2; 0.5	Messerschmitt Bf 110; Focke-Wulf Fw 190	Emden, Germany	P-47C Thunderbolt	61 FS, 56 FG
February 20, 1944	2	Bf 110	Steinhude Lake, Germany	P-47D Thunderbolt	61 FS, 56 FG
February 22, 1944	1	Fw 190	Lippstadt, Germany	P-47D	61 FS, 56 FG

SOURCES: Air Force Historical Study 85: USAF Credits for the Destruction of Enemy Aircraft, World War II

== Awards and decorations ==
During his lengthy career, Smith earned many decorations, including:

USAF Command pilot badge
Distinguished Service Cross
Air Force Distinguished Service Medal with bronze oak leaf cluster
Legion of Merit
Distinguished Flying Cross with three bronze oak leaf clusters
Air Medal with one silver and three oak leaf clusters
Air Force Commendation Medal
Air Force Presidential Unit Citation with bronze oak leaf cluster
Air Force Outstanding Unit Award with Valor device and bronze oak leaf cluster
American Campaign Medal
European-African-Middle Eastern Campaign Medal with silver campaign star
World War II Victory Medal
Army of Occupation Medal with 'Germany' clasp
National Defense Service Medal with bronze service star
Vietnam Service Medal with three bronze campaign stars
Air Force Longevity Service Award with silver and bronze oak leaf clusters
Commander's Cross of the National Order of Vietnam
Vietnam Air Force Distinguished Service Order (1st Class)
Vietnam Gallantry Cross with Palm
Vietnam Staff Service Medal (1st class)
Chuong My Medal (2nd class)
Republic of Vietnam Gallantry Cross Unit Citation
Vietnam Campaign Medal

=== Distinguished Service Cross citation ===

Smith, Donavon F.
First Lieutenant (Air Corps), U.S. Army Air Forces
61st Fighter Squadron, 56th Fighter Group, 8th Air Force
Date of Action: December 11, 1943

Citation:

The President of the United States of America, authorized by Act of Congress July 9, 1918, takes pleasure in presenting the Distinguished Service Cross to First Lieutenant (Air Corps) Donavon Francis Smith, United States Army Air Forces, for extraordinary heroism in connection with military operations against an armed enemy while serving as Pilot of a P-47 Fighter Airplane in the 61st Fighter Squadron, 56th Fighter Group, EIGHTH Air Force, in aerial combat against enemy forces on a bomber escort mission against military objectives in the heavily defended area of Emden, Germany, on December 11, 1943. Near the target the bombers were attacked by a large force of rocket-firing enemy fighters. Disregarding the enemy's superiority in numbers and fire power and the danger from attack by fighters known to be flying above the rocket-carrying aircraft, Lieutenant Smith's flight attacked and became engaged with five ME-110 type fighters. Lieutenant Smith himself destroyed one enemy plane and damaged another. In the heat of battle Lieutenant Smith became separated from his flights and while trying to rejoin he observed an ME-110 airplane below and made a diving attack. He was immediately attacked by a FW-190 fighter from above, and without regard to his personal safety, Lieutenant Smith continued his attacks and destroyed the enemy plane. He then maneuvered into position for a head-on attack against his pursuer. Holding a collision course and firing accurately, Lieutenant Smith closed to such a short range that his enemy, fearing collision, bailed out, leaving his airplane to crash. Through his heroism and exceptional flying skill on this occasion, Lieutenant Smith rendered distinguished and valorous service to our nation. His unquestionable valor in aerial combat is in keeping with the highest traditions of the military service and reflects great credit upon himself, the 8th Air Force, and the United States Army Air Forces.

== Effective dates of promotion ==
Insignia	Rank	Date
	Lieutenant general	July 1, 1973
	Major general	August 1, 1968
	Brigadier general	November 1, 1966
	Colonel	June 15, 1954
	Lieutenant colonel	February 20, 1951
	Major	September 27, 1944
	Captain	April 4, 1944
	First lieutenant	September 9, 1943
	Second lieutenant	October 9, 1942
