= 518th Air Defense Group =

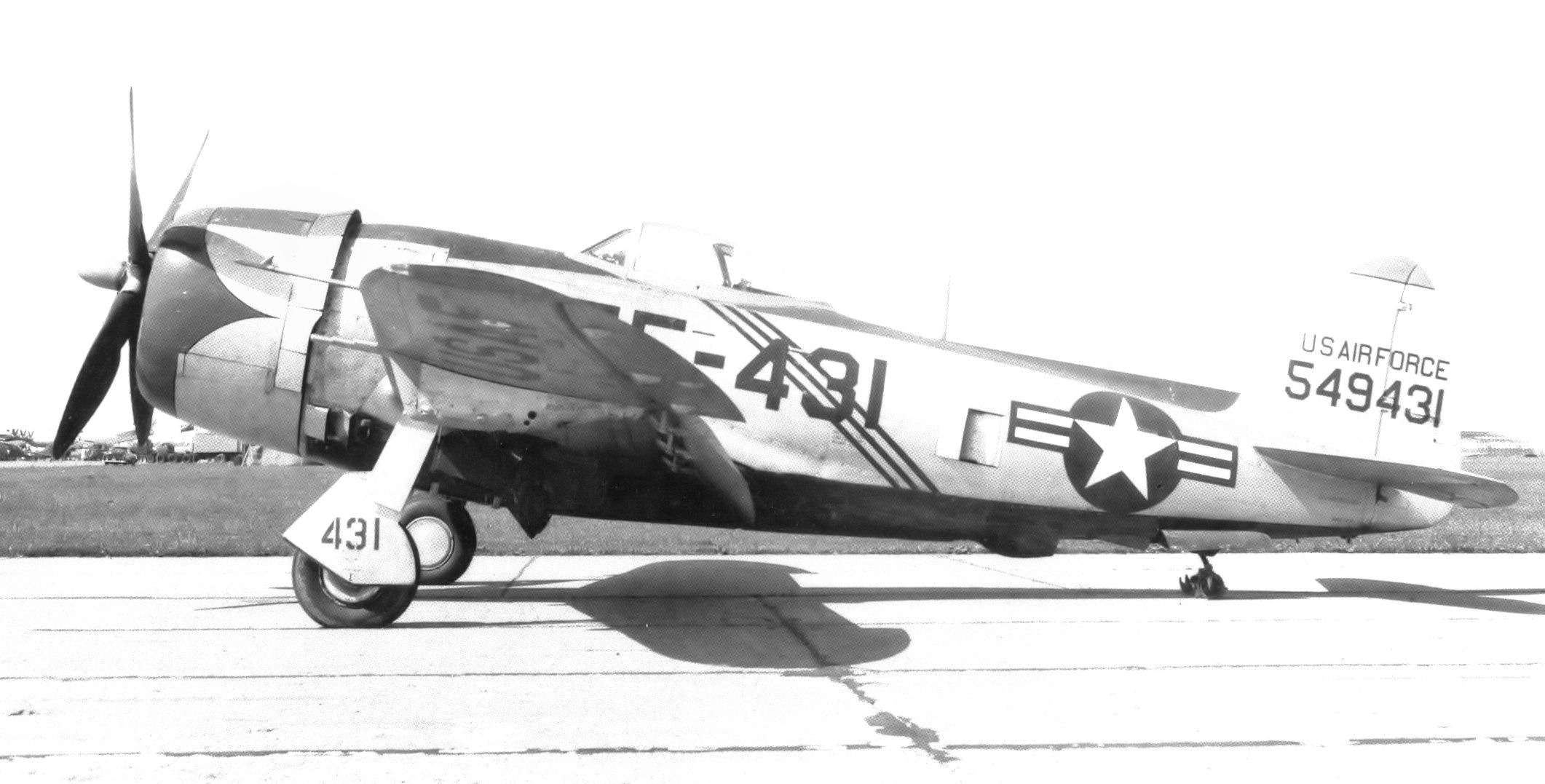
- F-47 of the group's 47th Fighter-Interceptor Squadron (Note: Aircraft is Republic F-47D-40-RA Thunderbolt, serial 45-49431. This aircraft was destroyed in a mid-air collision with another F-47. Baugher, Joe (4 March 2023). "1942 USAF Serial Numbers". Joe Baugher.)
- Active: 1945; 1953–1955
- Country: United States
- Branch: United States Air Force
- Role: Air defense

Commanders
- Notable commanders: Lt Gen Donavon F. Smith

The 518th Air Defense Group is a disbanded United States Air Force organization. Its last assignment was with the 4707th Air Defense Wing, stationed at Niagara Falls Municipal Airport, New York, where it was inactivated in 1955.

The group was originally activated the 518th Air Service Group, a support unit for the 465th Bombardment Group at the end of World War II in Italy and then redeployed to the Caribbean, where it supported redeploying units until it was inactivated in 1945.

The group was activated once again in 1953, when Air Defense Command (ADC) established it as the headquarters for a dispersed fighter-interceptor squadron and the medical, aircraft maintenance, and administrative squadrons supporting it. It was replaced in 1955 when ADC transferred its mission, equipment, and personnel to the 15th Fighter Group in a project that replaced air defense groups commanding fighter squadrons with fighter groups with distinguished records during World War II.

== History ==
=== World War II ===
The group was activated shortly as the 518th Air Service Group in Italy in early 1945. It was split from the all-branch 323rd Service Group as part of the Army Air Forces creating Air Service Groups to service Air Corps units only. It was designed to support a single combat group. Its 944th Air Engineering Squadron provided aircraft maintenance that was beyond the capability of the combat group, its 768th Air Materiel Squadron handled all supply matters, and its Headquarters & Base Services Squadron provided other support. The unit supported the 465th Bombardment Group in Italy. The group moved to the Caribbean and provided support for flying units redeploying from Europe to the United States. It was disbanded in 1948.

=== Cold War ===
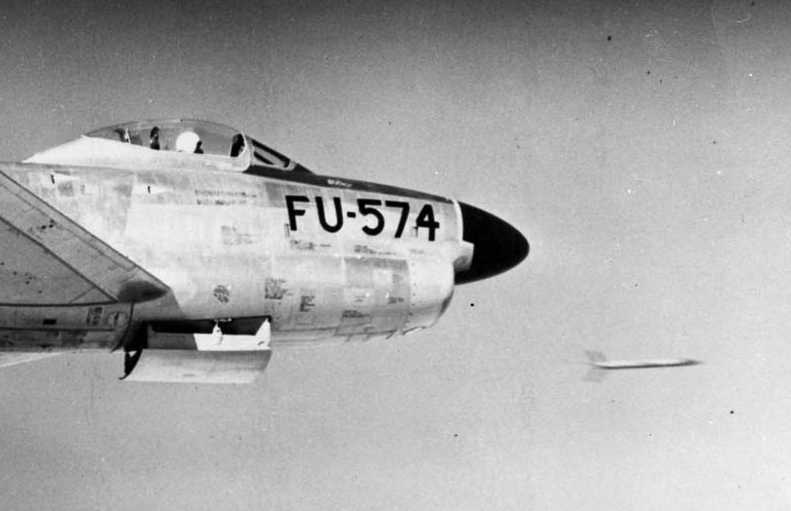
F-86D firing a Mighty Mouse rocket

During the Cold War, the 518th group was reconstituted, redesignated as an air defense group, and activated at Niagara Falls Municipal Airport in 1953 with responsibility for air defense of Niagara Falls, Toronto, Western and upper New York area. It was assigned the 47th Fighter-Interceptor Squadron, which was already stationed at Niagara Falls, and flying World War II era Republic F-47 Thunderbolts as its operational component. The 47th had been assigned to the 4708th Defense Wing. The group was assigned three squadrons to perform its support responsibilities. It converted the same month to jet propelled North American F-86 Sabre aircraft.

The 47th upgraded to a later airborne intercept radar equipped and Mighty Mouse rocket armed version of the Sabre in September 1953, but its replacement aircraft were not delivered until early 1954. The group replaced the 76th Air Base Squadron as the active duty USAF host unit at Niagara Falls Municipal Airport. The group was replaced by the 15th Fighter Group (Air Defense) in 1955 as part of Air Defense Command's Project Arrow, which was designed to bring back on the active list the fighter units which had compiled memorable records in the two world wars. The 518th group was disbanded once again in 1984.

== Lineage ==
- Constituted as 518th Air Service Group

Activated on 25 January 1945
Inactivated on 31 July 1945
Disbanded on 8 October 1948

- Reconstituted and redesignated 518th Air Defense Group on 21 January 1953

Activated on 16 February 1953
Inactivated on 18 August 1955
Disbanded on 27 September 1984

=== Assignments ===
- XV Air Force Service Command 25 Jan 1945
- Caribbean Division, Air Transport Command, 1945 – 31 July 1945
- 4707th Defense Wing (later 4707th Air Defense Wing), 16 February 1953 – 18 August 1955

=== Stations ===
- Pantanella Airfield, Italy, 25 January 1945
- Bagnoli Staging Area, Italy, 27 May 1945 – 6 June 1945
- Waller Field, Trinidad 15 June 1945 – 31 July 1945
- Niagara Falls Municipal Airport, New York, 16 February 1953 – 18 August 1955

=== Components ===
Operational Squadron

- 47th Fighter-Interceptor Squadron, 16 February 1953 – 18 August 1955

Support Units

- 518th Air Base Squadron, 16 February 1953 – 18 August 1955
- 518th Materiel Squadron, 16 February 1953 – 18 August 1955
- 518th Medical Squadron (later 518th USAF Infirmary), 16 February 1953 – 18 August 1955
- 768th Air Materiel Squadron, 25 January 1945 – 31 July 1945
- 944th Air Engineering Squadron, 25 January 1945 – 31 July 1945

=== Aircraft ===
- Republic F-47D Thunderbolt, 1953
- North American F-86A Sabre, 1953-1954
- North American F-86D Sabre, 1954-1955

=== Commanders ===
- Lt Col Lloyd L. Connell, 1 January 1945 – 1945

== See also ==
- List of United States Air Force Aerospace Defense Command Interceptor Squadrons
- List of F-86 Sabre units
