= 819th Strategic Aerospace Division =

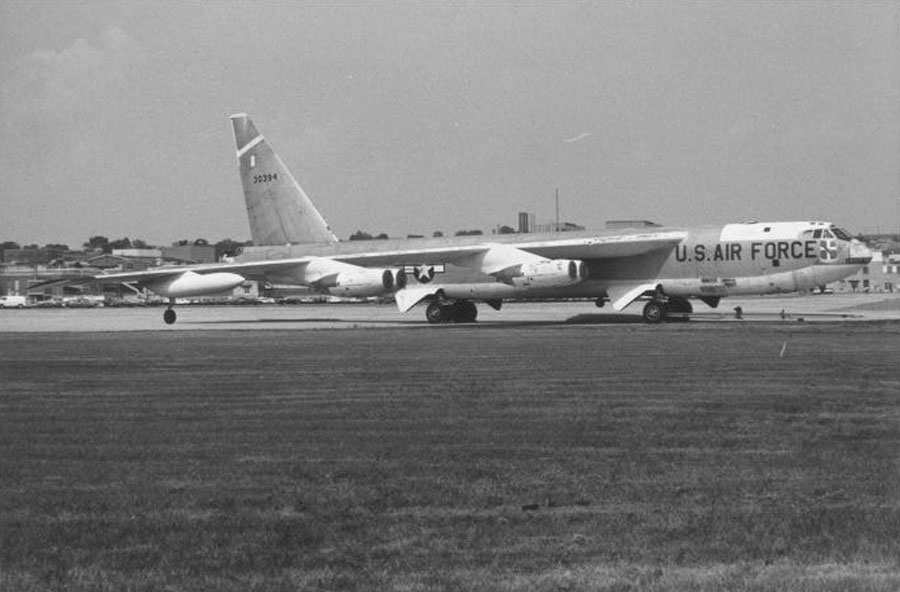
- Boeing B-52 of the division's 95th Bombardment Wing
- Active: 1956–1966
- Country: United States
- Branch: United States Air Force
- Role: Command of strategic strike forces

Insignia
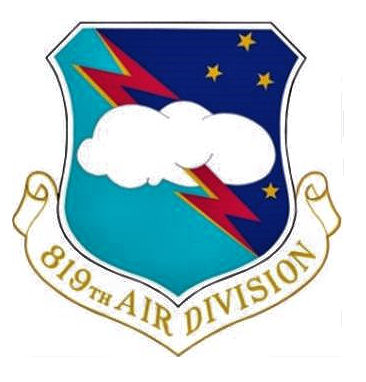
- 819th Strategic Aerospace Division emblem (Note: Approved 21 January 1959. Description: Per bend azure and light blue, in fess a cloud argent pierced by a lightning flash in bend gules fimbriated to base or between four mullets of the last [color mentioned] three in sinister chief and one in sinister base all within a diminished border of the third [color mentioned].)

The 819th Strategic Aerospace Division is an inactive United States Air Force formation. Its last assignment was with Second Air Force of Strategic Air Command (SAC) at Dyess Air Force Base, Texas, where it was inactivated on 2 July 1966.

The division was activated as the 819th Air Division in 1956 to command two Boeing B-47 Stratojet wings that SAC was organizing at Dyess. "The division emphasized flying operations, flying training, and aircraft maintenance. In fulfilling its duties, the 819th participated in numerous tactical training exercises throughout its existence." Until April 1961, the division also provided supporting services at Dyess through its 819th Air Base Group.

After 1961, the wing became an operational headquarters for wings located at bases in the southwestern United States. It added SM-65 Atlas ICBMs, Boeing B-52 Stratofortresss and Boeing KC-135 Stratotankers in 1962, and its B-47s were phased out by the middle of the following year. The missile mission brought with it a new name, 819th Strategic Aerospace Division.

The division was inactivated in 1966 and its component wings were assigned to other SAC divisions.

== History ==
=== B-47 era ===
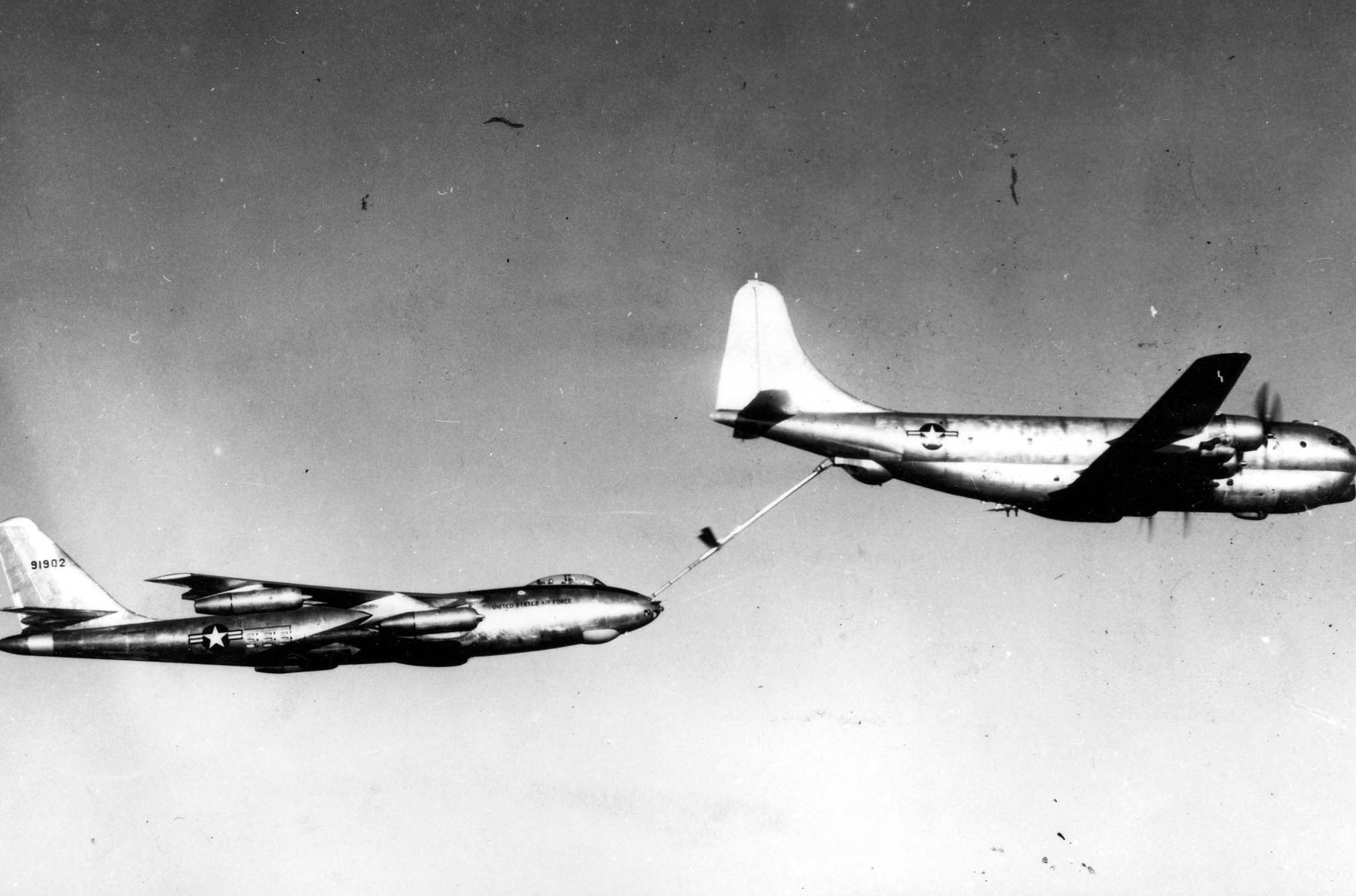
B-47 refueling from a KC-97

The 819th Air Division was activated By Strategic Air Command (SAC) at Dyess Air Force Base, Texas in January 1956 as the command headquarters for Dyess in anticipation of the movement of a second Boeing B-47 Stratojet wing to Dyess. In June, its 819th Air Base Group became the host organization for Dyess, taking over from the 341st Air Base Group, which had acted in that capacity since the fall of 1956.

The division assumed command of the 341st Bombardment Wing, flying B-47s and Boeing KC-97 Stratofreighters from Fifteenth Air Force upon the division's activation. In September 1957, the 96th Bombardment Wing moved to Dyess from Altus Air Force Base, Oklahoma, where it had equipped with B-47s and KC-97s and became part of the division.

Each of the division's two wings deployed as units to Andersen Air Force Base, Guam. The 96th Wing in early 1957, and the 341st wing for the first four months of 1958. Although its wings did not deploy as units after this time, they did deploy aircrews and aircraft to such locations as RAF Bruntingthorpe, RAF Greenham Common in the United Kingdom, Zaragoza Air Base, Spain and Elmendorf and Eielson Air Force Bases, Alaska in Operation Reflex.

The 4th Strategic Support Squadron, flying Douglas C-124 Globemaster IIs to support special weapons movements, and which had moved to Dyess from Ellsworth Air Force Base, South Dakota in June 1957, was reassigned to the division's 96th Wing in 1959. In March 1961, the squadron's mission was transferred to Air Materiel Command and the squadron was inactivated.

In June 1960 the division was assigned a unit stationed elsewhere, when the 310th Bombardment Wing at Schilling Air Force Base, Kansas, another Stratojet wing, was assigned to the 819th. This transfer occurred because the 310th's parent 802d Air Division was inactivated as Shilling became a single wing base.

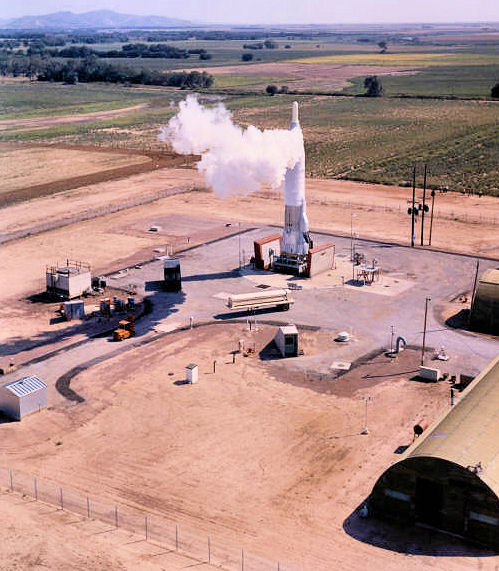
SM-65F Atlas of the division's 577th Strategic Missile Squadron

Beginning in April 1961, the 341st wing began to phase down in anticipation of its inactivation, which occurred on 25 June 1961. At the same time, the division added the SM-65 Atlas missile to its strategic forces, when the 550th Strategic Missile Squadron stood up under the 310th wing in April, while the 578th Strategic Missile Squadron was activated under the 96th wing in July. The first intercontinental ballistic missiles at Dyess did not go on alert until April 1962, however. In June, the division was transformed into an operational headquarters only, when its 819th Combat Support Group was inactivated and its mission transferred to the 96th Combat Support Group, which was part of the 96th Wing. The 819th Medical Group was reassigned to the 96th Wing at the same time.

=== B-52 era ===
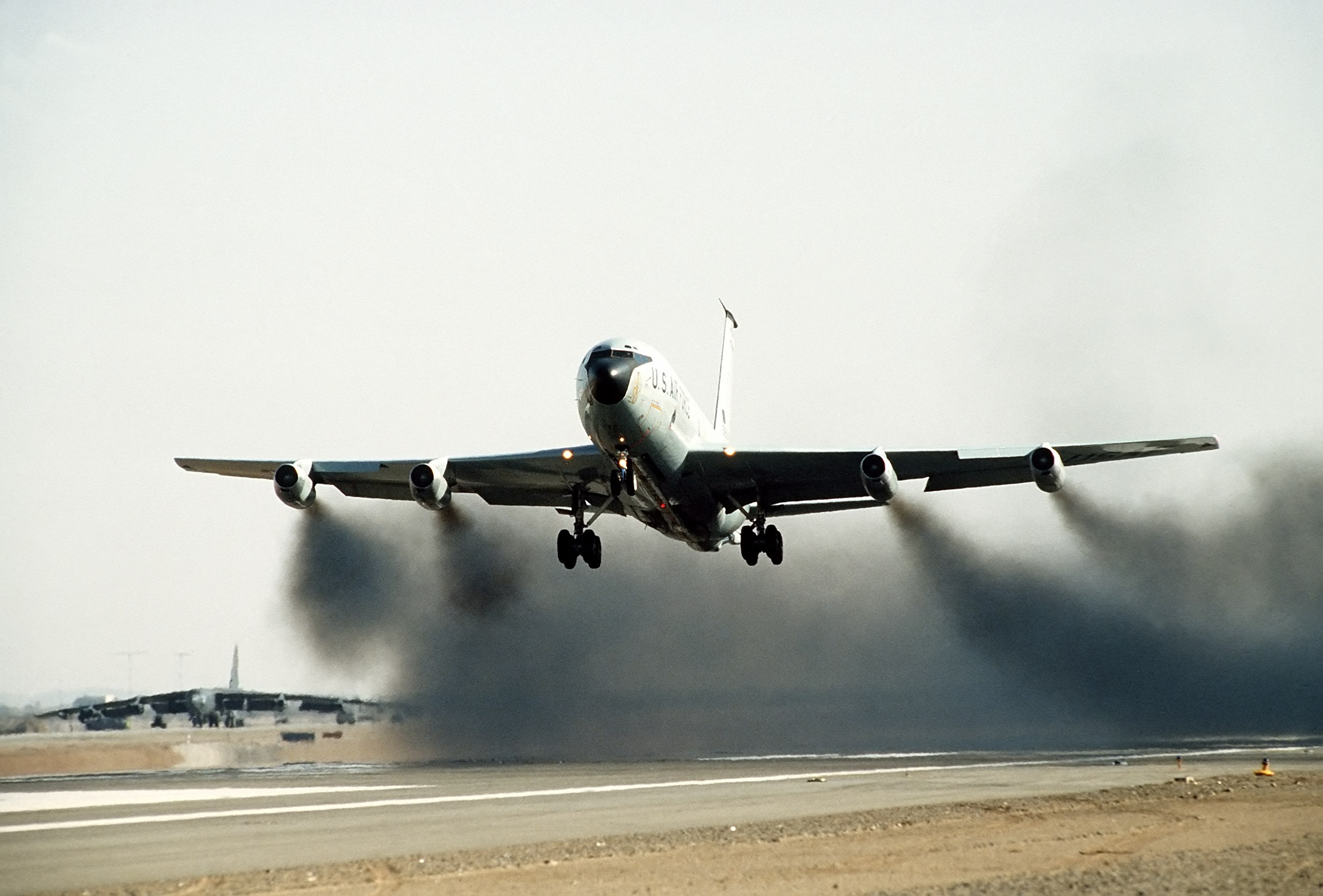
Boeing KC-135 takeoff

In April 1962 SAC renamed its units that were responsible for both bomber and missile operations to include the word "aerospace". The division became the 819th Strategic Aerospace Division and its 96th and 310th wings were renamed the 96th and 310th Strategic Aerospace Wings. In July, SAC shuffled the responsibilities of its air divisions and the 310th was transferred to the 22d Strategic Aerospace Division and the 95th Bombardment Wing at Biggs Air Force Base, Texas was transferred from the 810th Air Division to take its place. Unlike the wings previously assigned to the 819th, the 95th wing flew the Boeing B-52 Stratofortress and the Boeing KC-135 Stratotanker. The B-52 brought with it a new mission, the periodic maintenance of aircraft on airborne alert, in Operation Chrome Dome. In addition, half of SAC B-52 wing aircraft were maintained on fifteen-minute alert at their home stations, fully fueled, armed and ready for combat to reduce vulnerability to a Soviet missile strike.

In March 1963, the 578th became the 96th Wing's sole strategic strike unit, as the wing's three B-47 squadrons were inactivated. This was, however, only a hiatus as the 337th Bombardment Squadron was activated again in September with Boeing B-52 Stratofortresses as part of SAC's program to disperse its B-52 fleet over a larger number of bases, thus making it more difficult for the Soviet Union to knock out the entire fleet with a surprise first strike.

July 1964 saw another SAC realignment of its divisions. The 95th wing was reassigned to the 12th Air Division, but its place was taken by another Stratofortress outfit, the 461st Bombardment Wing at Amarillo Air Force Base, Texas. The 461st's time with the division was short, for exactly one year later, its replaced by the 11th Strategic Aerospace Wing at Carswell Air Force Base and the 494th Bombardment Wing at Sheppard Air Force Base, Texas, although the 494th's assignment was temporary, ending in October in preparation for the 494th wing's inactivation as the Air Force began to retire its early model B-52s.

The division was inactivated in July 1966 and its 11th and 96th Wings were reassigned to the 19th Air Division.

== Lineage ==
- Established as 819 Air Division on 24 January 1956

Activated on 1 February 1956
Redesignated 819 Strategic Aerospace Division on 1 April 1962
Discontinued and inactivated, on 2 July 1966

=== Assignments ===
- Fifteenth Air Force, 1 February 1956
- Second Air Force, 1 July 1965 – 2 July 1966

=== Stations ===
- Abilene Air Force Base, (later, Dyess Air Force Base), Texas, 1 February 1956 – 2 July 1966

=== Components ===
Wings

- 11th Strategic Aerospace Wing: 1 July 1965 – 2 July 1966

Carswell Air Force Base, Texas

- 95th Bombardment Wing: 1 July 1962 – 1 July 1964

Biggs Air Force Base, Texas

- 96th Bombardment Wing (later 96th Strategic Aerospace Wing): 3 September 1957 – 2 July 1966 (attached to 3d Air Division 10 January 1957 – 7 April 1957)
- 310th Bombardment Wing (later 310th Strategic Aerospace Wing): 20 June 1960 – 1 July 1962

Schilling Air Force Base, Kansas

- 341st Bombardment Wing: 1 February 1956 – 25 June 1961 (attached to 3d Air Division 9 January 1958 – c. 4 April 1958)
- 461st Bombardment Wing: 1 July 1964 – 1 July 1965

Amarillo Air Force Base, Texas

- 494th Bombardment Wing: 1 July 1965 – 1 October 1965

Sheppard Air Force Base, Texas

Groups

- 819th Air Base Group (later 819th Combat Support Group): 15 June 1956 – 25 June 1961
- 819th Medical Group: 1 November 1958 – 25 June 1961

Other

- 4021st USAF Hospital: 15 June 1956 – 1 November 1958

=== Aircraft and missiles ===
- Boeing KC-97 Stratofreighter, 1956–1962
- Boeing B-47 Stratojet, 1957–1963
- Douglas C-124 Globemaster II
- SM-65 Atlas, 1962–1966
- Boeing B-52 Stratofortress, 1962–1966
- Boeing KC-135 Stratotanker, 1962–1966

=== Commanders ===
- Brig Gen Charles B. Westover, 5 March 1956
- Col Frank P. Sturdivant, 27 October 1957
- Brig Gen William R. Yancy, 28 February 1959
- Brig Gen Pinkham Smith, 8 July 1961
- Brig Gen William W. Wisman, 10 September 1962
- Maj Gen Kenneth R. Powell, 14 May 1964 – 2 July 1966

== See also ==
- List of United States Air Force air divisions
- List of USAF Bomb Wings and Wings assigned to Strategic Air Command
- List of B-47 units of the United States Air Force
- List of B-52 Units of the United States Air Force
