= 15th Wing =

15th Wing

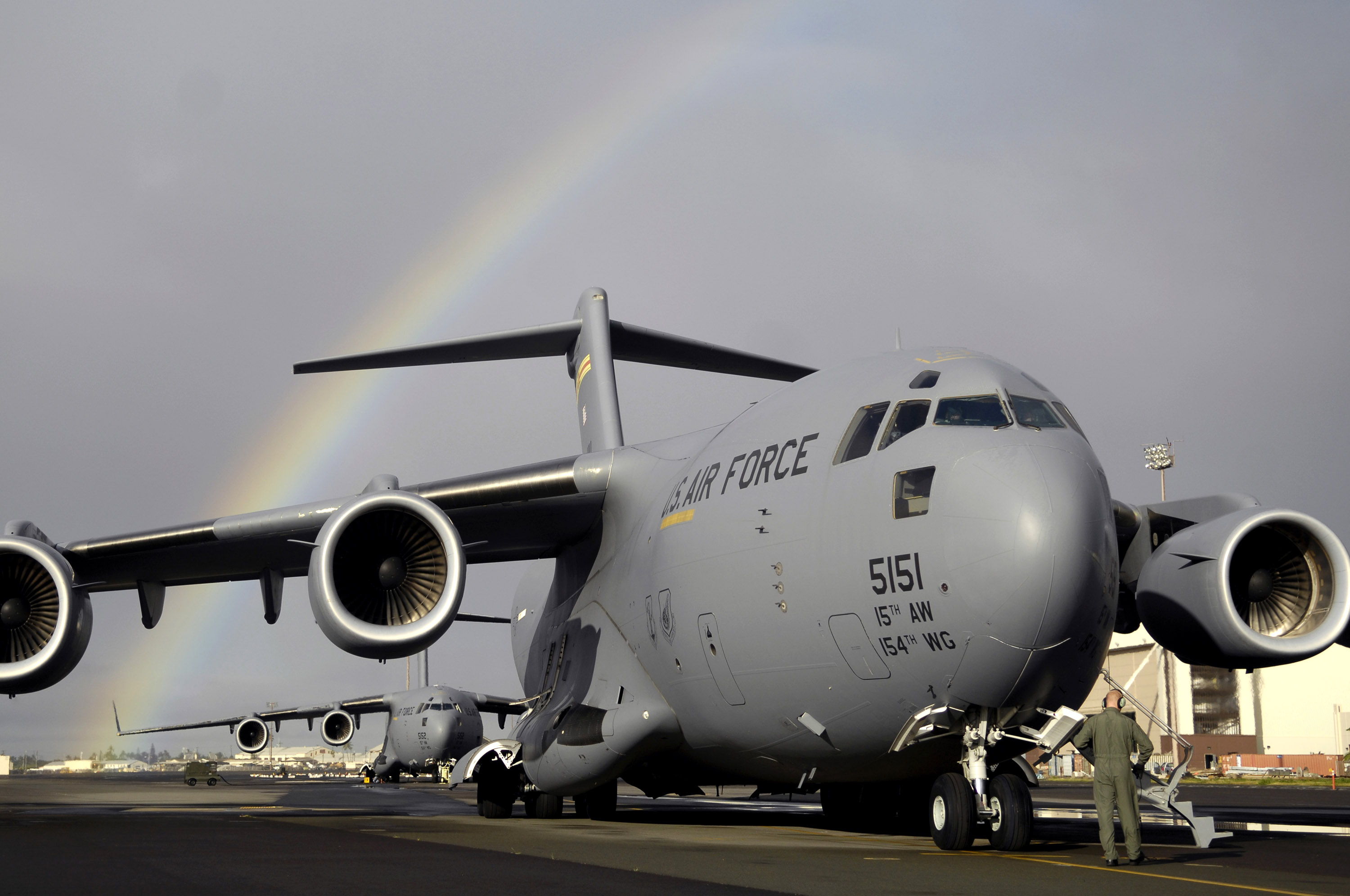
- C-17 Globemaster IIIs of the 15th Wing at Hickam AFB
- Active: 1940–1946, 1955–1960, 1962–1970, 1971–present
- Country: United States
- Branch: United States Air Force
- Type: Composite
- Role: Fighter and Airlift
- Part of: Pacific Air Forces
- Garrison/HQ: Hickam Air Force Base, Hawaii
- Motto: Prosequor Alis (Latin for 'I Pursue with Wings') (1942–1992)
- Engagements: Pacific Ocean theater of World War II
- Decorations: Distinguished Unit Citation (1x); Air Force Outstanding Unit Award (13x)

Commanders
- Current commander: Colonel Kyle Clinton
- Vice Commander: Colonel Ryan M. Graf
- Command Chief: Chief Master Sergeant Michael M. Haywood

Insignia
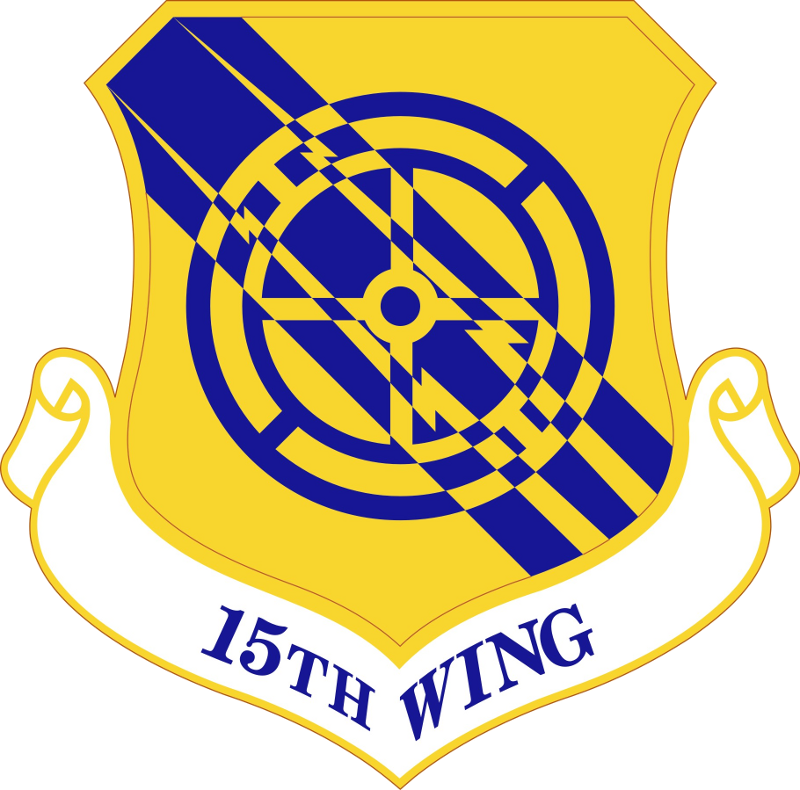
- 15th Wing emblem (Note: approved 15 March 1963 based on emblem approved 5 October 1942.)
- Tail code: HH
- Tail Flash

The 15th Wing is a wing of the United States Air Force at Joint Base Pearl Harbor–Hickam, Hawaii. The wing reports to 11th Air Force, Headquartered at Joint Base Elmendorf-Richardson, Alaska.

Its history goes back to just before World War II, when the 15th Pursuit Group was organized at Wheeler Field, Hawaii from elements of the 18th Pursuit Group. The group's combat effectiveness was largely destroyed during the Japanese attack on Pearl Harbor on 7 December 1941. Remanned and re-equipped as the 15th Fighter Group, it remained in the Hawaiian islands to provide for the air defense of the islands, although it deployed squadrons and detachments to the Central and Western Pacific areas. It later became a Twentieth Air Force very long range fighter group on Iwo Jima, escorting Boeing B-29 Superfortress bombers that attacked the Japanese home Islands. In April 1945 the group earned a Distinguished Unit Citation for combat action over Japan. Following the end of the war, the group returned to Hawaii, where it was inactivated in 1946.

The group was again activated in 1955 to replace the 518th Air Defense Group as part of Air Defense Command's Project Arrow, which replaced units formed during the Cold War with those that had a distinguished history in the two world wars. It performed the air defense mission at Niagara Falls Municipal Airport, New York until it was discontinued in 1960 and its mission assumed by the New York Air National Guard.

In July 1962, Tactical Air Command organized the 15th Tactical Fighter Wing as the second McDonnell F-4 Phantom II wing at MacDill Air Force Base, Florida. Although its companion 12th Tactical Fighter Wing was one of the first wings deployed during the Vietnam War, the 15th acted as an F-4 combat crew training unit during this era, although it assumed a tactical role during the Cuban Missile Crisis and the Pueblo crisis. In 1970 the wing was inactivated and its mission, personnel and equipment were transferred to the 1st Tactical Fighter Wing, which moved on paper to MacDill from Hamilton Air Force Base, California.

Little more than a year later, the wing returned to Hawaii as the 15th Air Base Wing, when it replaced the 6486th Air Base Wing as the host organization at Hickam Air Force Base. The wing has been stationed at Hickam AFB (now part of Joint Base Pearl Harbor–Hickam) since then. In 1984, the 15th group and 15th wing were consolidated into a single unit.

== Mission ==
The mission of the 15th Wing is to develop and sustain combat-ready airmen, in partnership with the total force, to provide global mobility, global reach, precision engagement, and agile combat support anytime, anywhere. The 15th Wing partners with the 154th Wing of the Hawaii Air National Guard to provide strategic and tactical airlift capability to Pacific Air Forces and Air Mobility Command and to support local and worldwide missions of combat support and humanitarian or disaster relief.

To execute its mission, the wing has established priorities: First, execute the mission; second ensure readiness; third develop the wing's airmen; fourth, grow resilient airmen and families; and fifth, strengthen partnerships.

== Units ==
The 15 Wing is composed of four groups and one direct reporting squadron each with specific functions. The operations group controls all flying and airfield operations. The maintenance group performs aircraft and aircraft support equipment maintenance. The medical group provides medical and dental care. The 647th Air Base Group provides direct mission support and all Air Force communications. The 15th Comptroller Squadron performs financial management for the wing. The remaining functions of the wing are staff agencies.

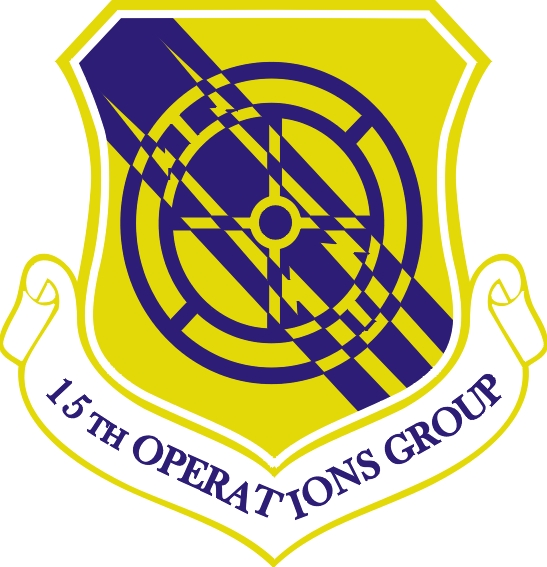
- 15th Operations Group
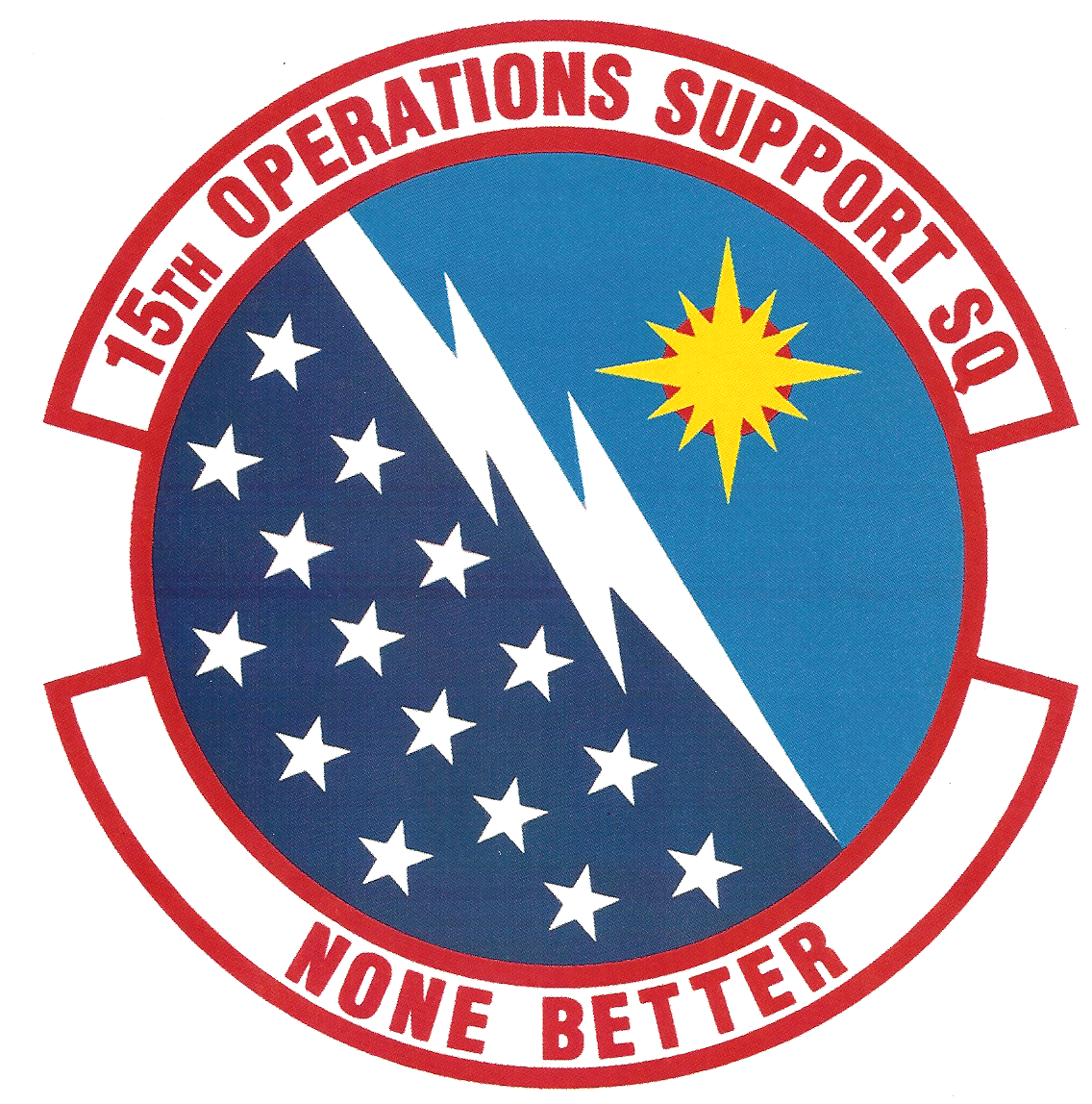
  - 15th Operations Support Squadron
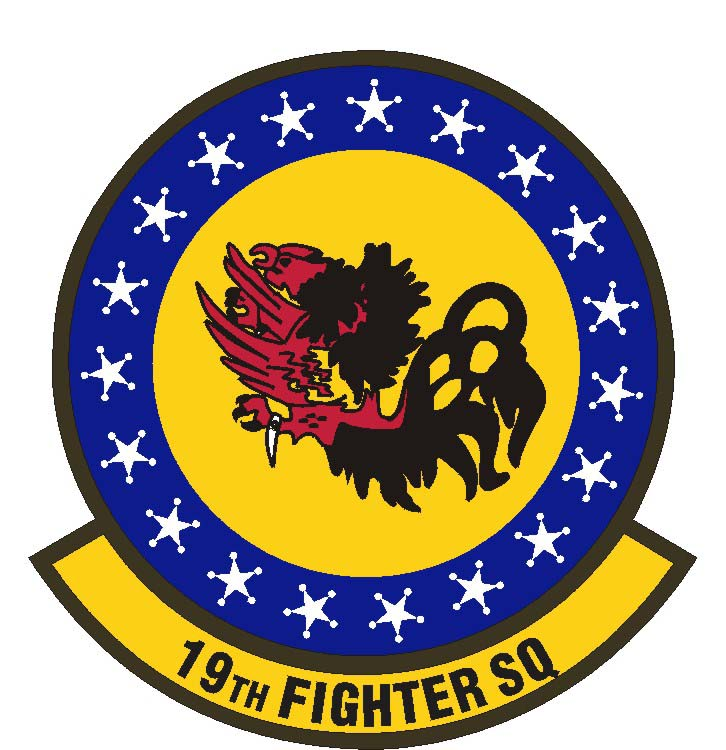
  - 19th Fighter Squadron (F-22)
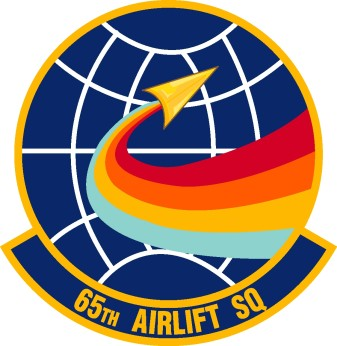
  - 65th Airlift Squadron (C-37, C-40)
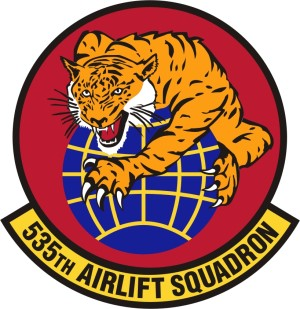
  - 535th Airlift Squadron (C-17) (tail code: HH)
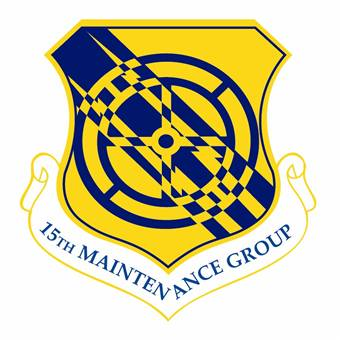
- 15th Maintenance Group
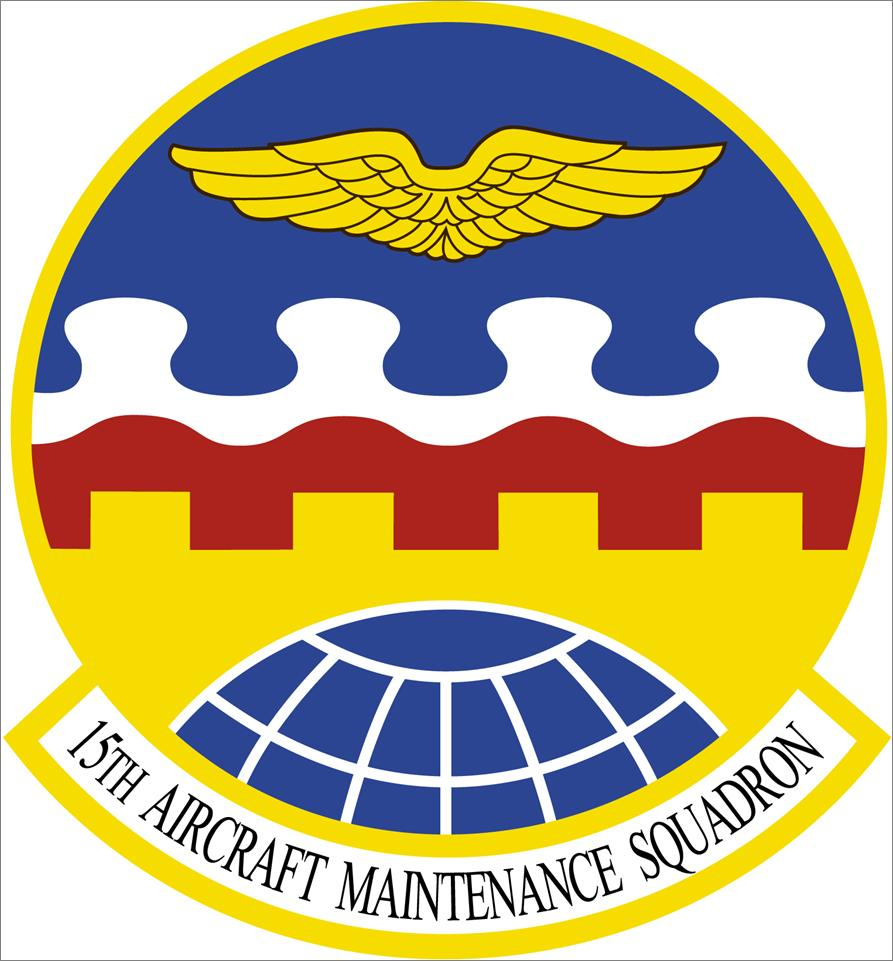
  - 15th Aircraft Maintenance Squadron
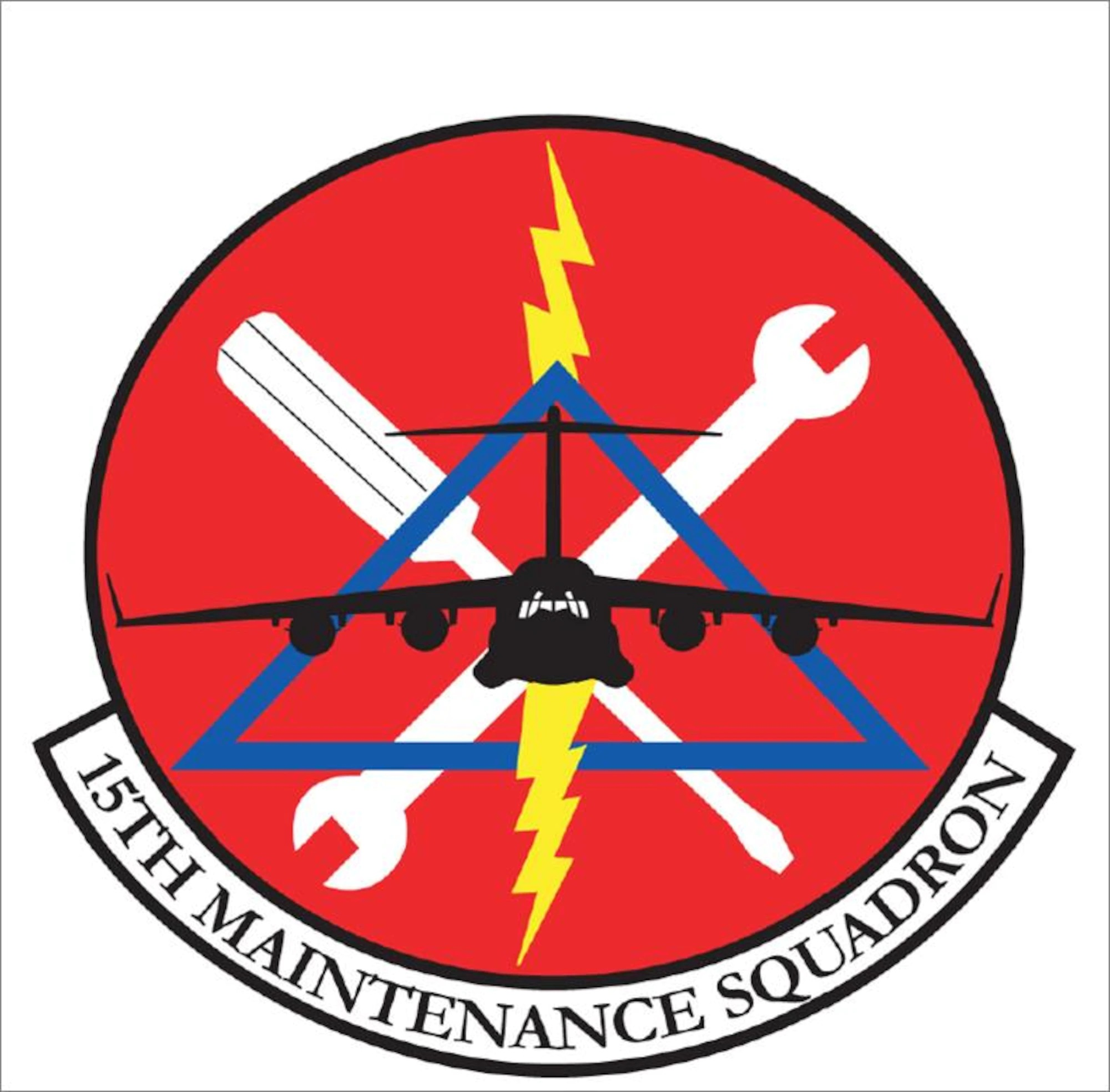
  - 15th Maintenance Squadron
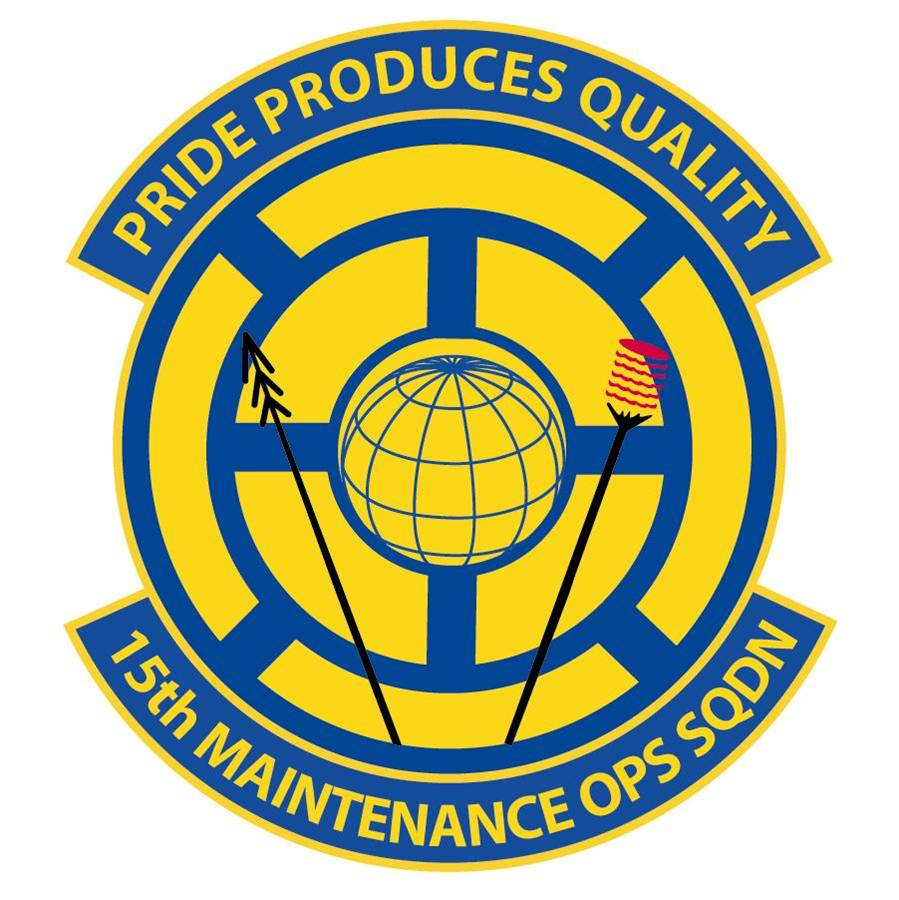
  - 15th Maintenance Operations Squadron
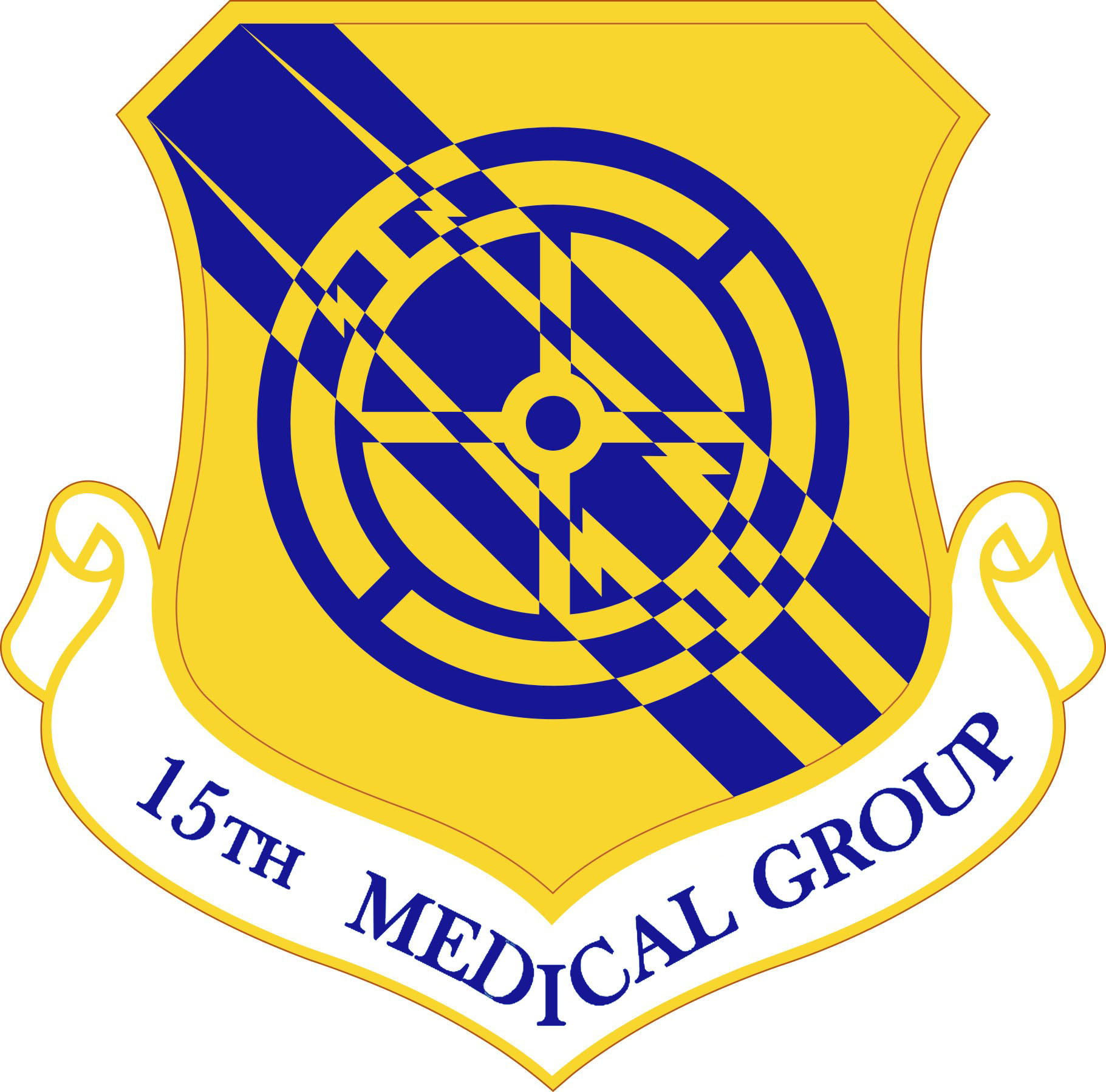
- 15th Medical Group
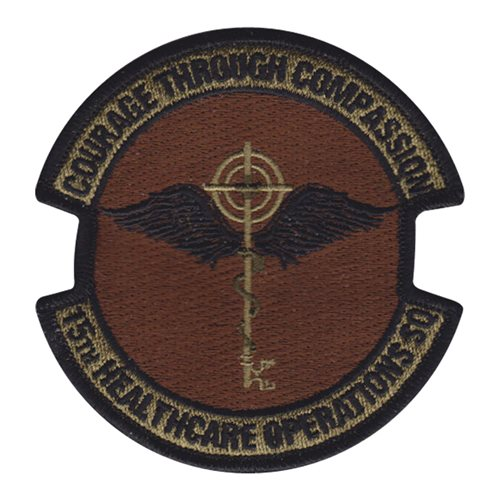
  - 15th Healthcare Operations Squadron
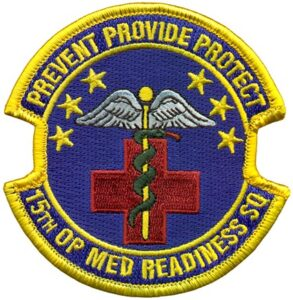
  - 15th Operational Medical Readiness Squadron
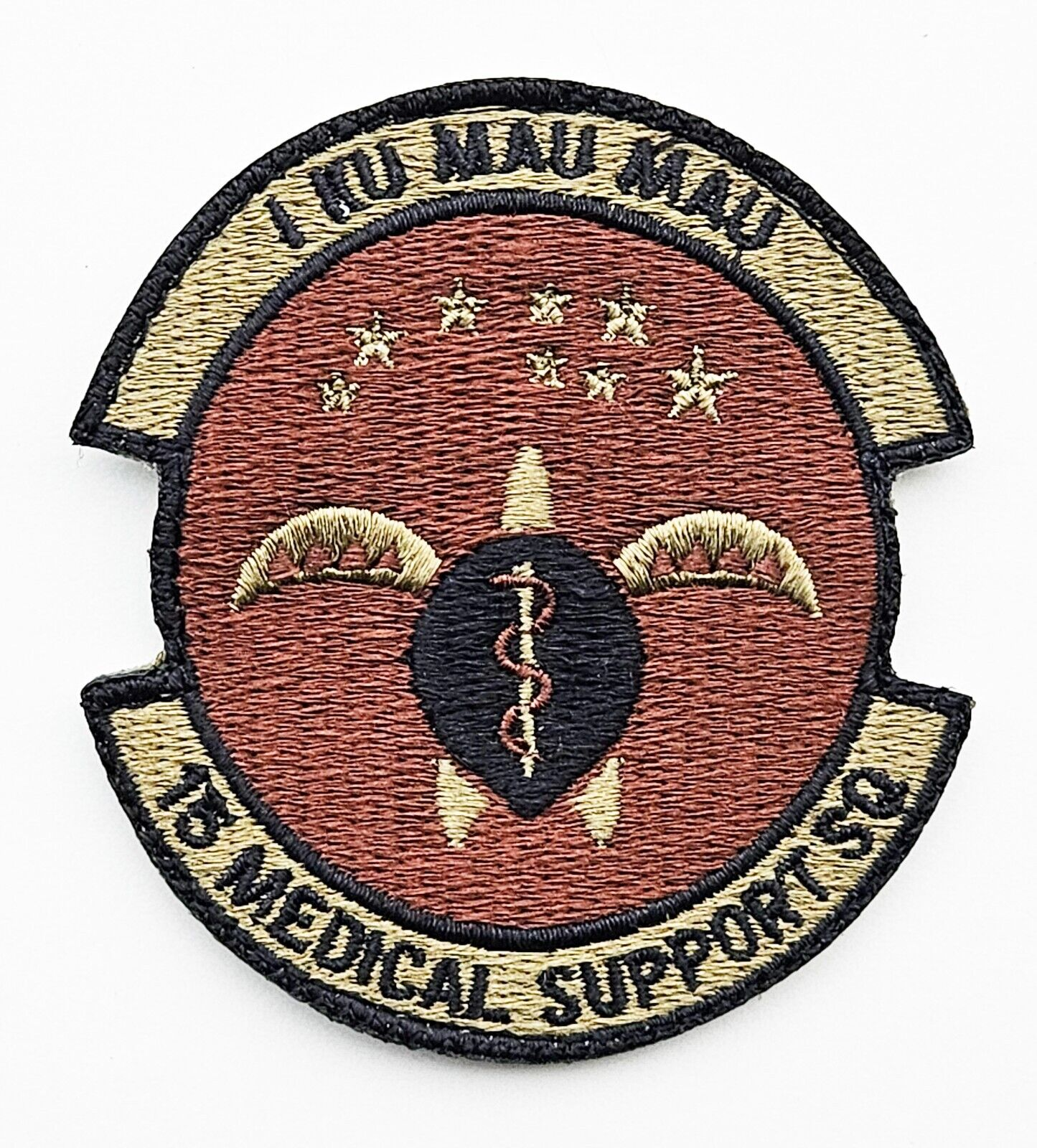
  - 15th Medical Support Squadron
- 647th Air Base Group
  - 647th Civil Engineer Squadron
  - 647th Force Support Squadron
  - 647th Logistics Readiness Squadron
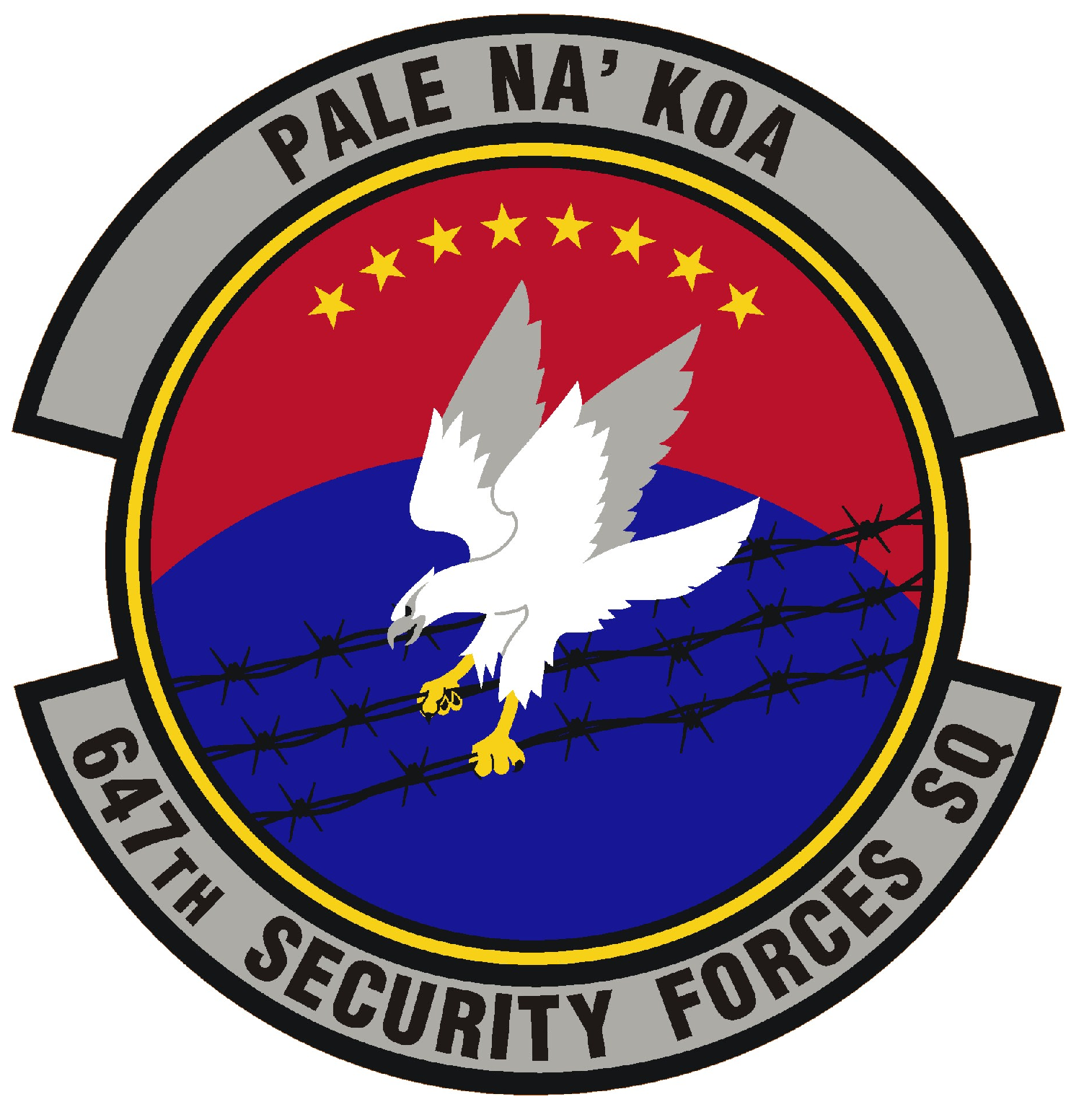
  - 647th Security Forces Squadron
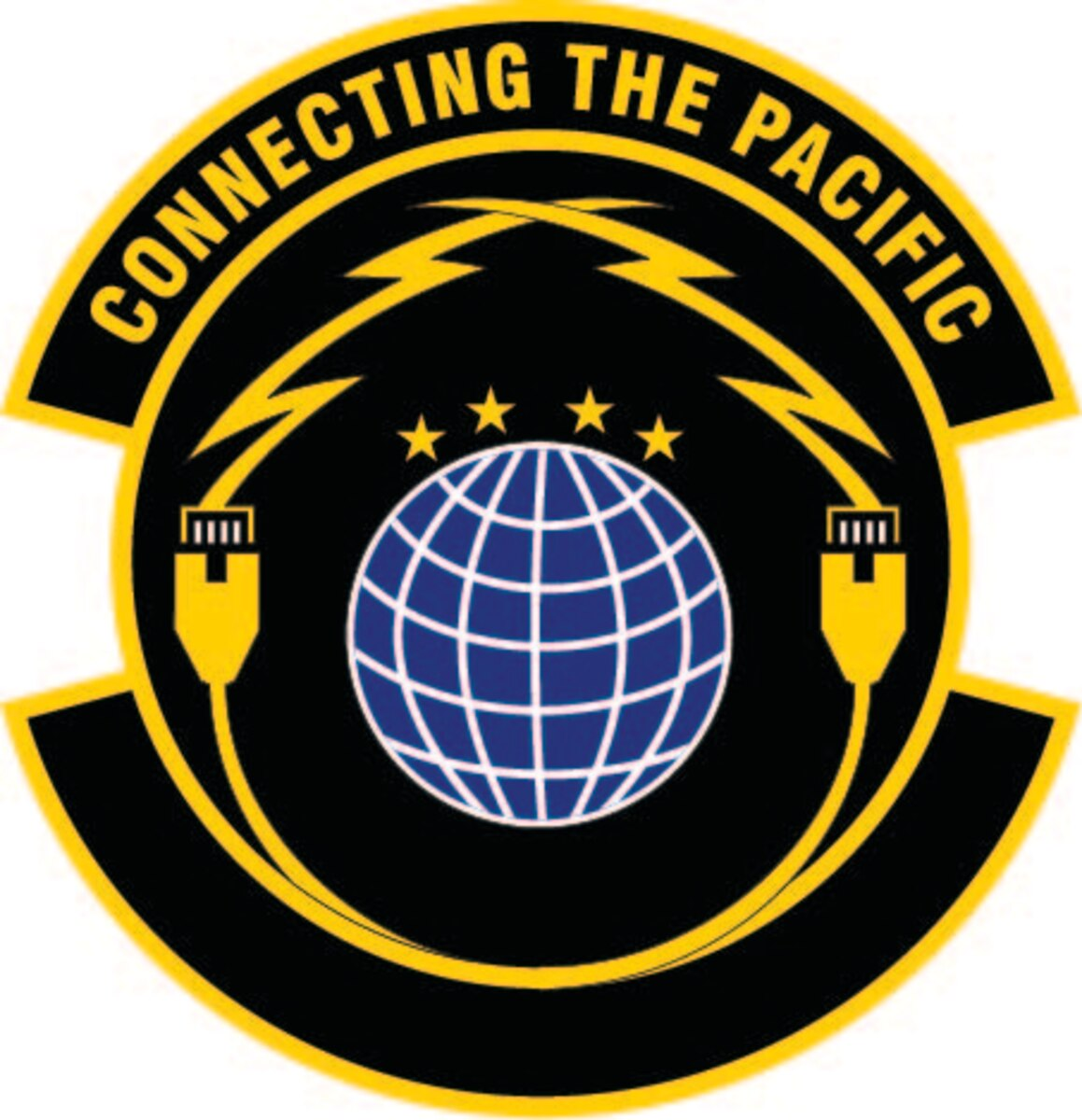
  - 747th Cyber Space Squadron
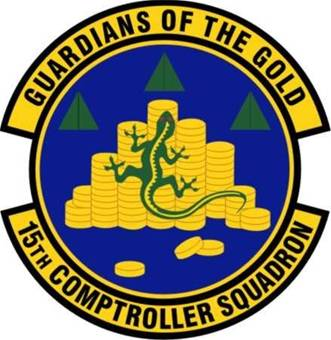
- 15th Comptroller Squadron

Joint Base Pearl Harbor–Hickam is also host to numerous tenant organizations. The Air Force side of the installation supports 140 tenant and associate units.

== History ==
=== World War II ===
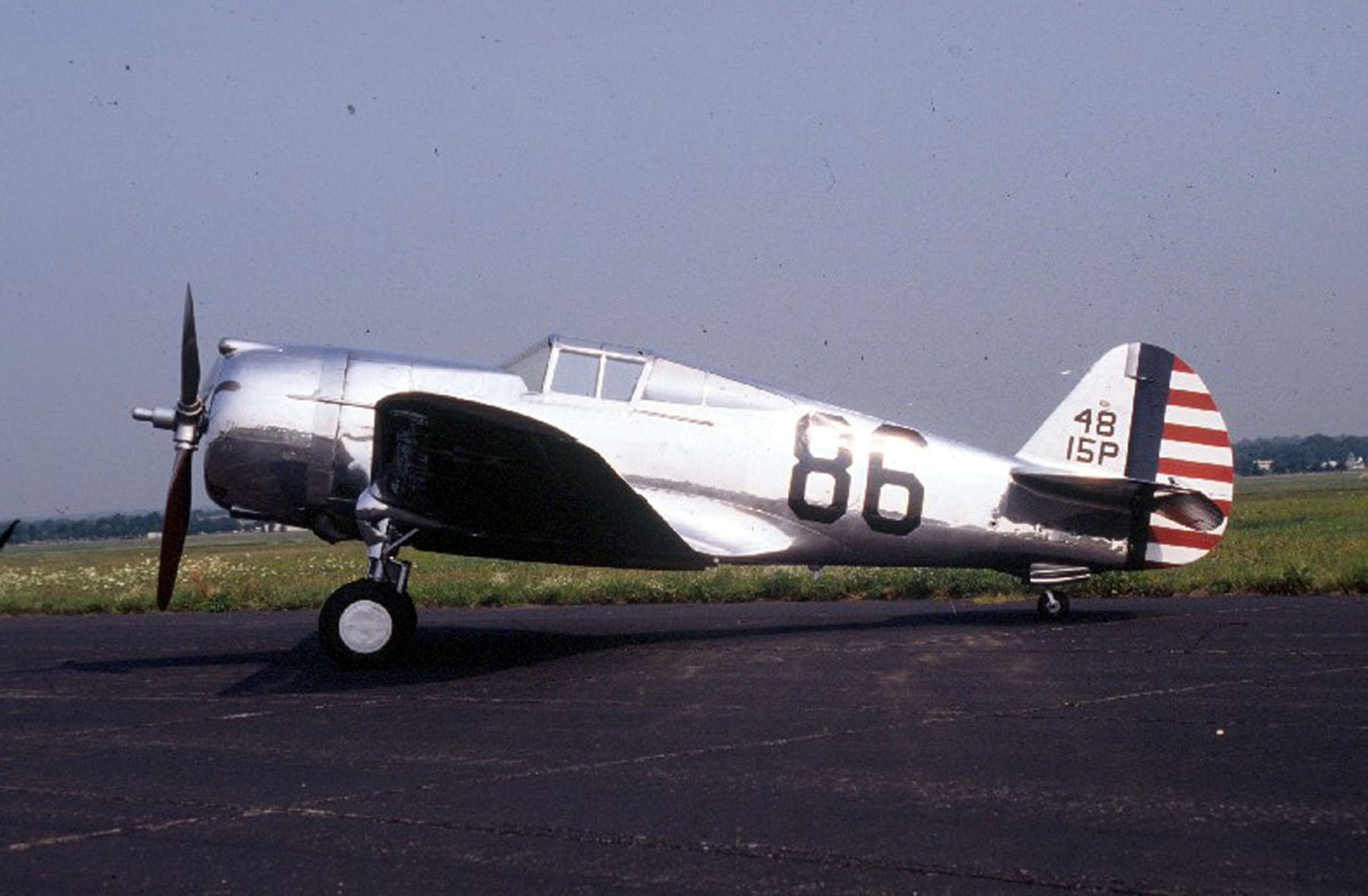
P-36A of the 15th Pursuit Group

The unit was originally constituted as the 15th Pursuit Group (Fighter) and was activated at Wheeler Field, Hawaii, on 1 December 1940 as part of the defense force for the Hawaiian Islands. The original squadrons of the group were the 45th, 46th, and 47th Pursuit Squadrons. The group drew its cadre from the 18th Pursuit Group, which had been stationed at Wheeler since 1927. In addition to its primary combat aircraft the group flew the Curtiss A-12 Shrike, Grumman OA-9 Goose, Martin B-12 and Boeing P-26 Peashooter during the prewar period.

A little more than a year later, on 7 December 1941, the group fought the Japanese after they began their Attack on Pearl Harbor. Bombing and strafing attacks that morning by carrier-based planes of the Japanese strike force destroyed many assigned aircraft and caused heavy casualties. However, twelve of the group's pilots succeeded in launching their Curtiss P-36 Hawk and Curtiss P-40 Warhawk aircraft from Wheeler and Haleiwa Fighter Strip, and flew 16 sorties, destroying 10 Japanese planes. Second Lieutenants George S. Welch and Kenneth M. Taylor, P-40 pilots assigned to the 47th Pursuit Squadron, shot down four and two Japanese aircraft, respectively, and were later cited for extraordinary heroism during the attack. Both received the Distinguished Service Cross. Because of the heavy casualties suffered by the group in the attack, it was remanned and reorganized.

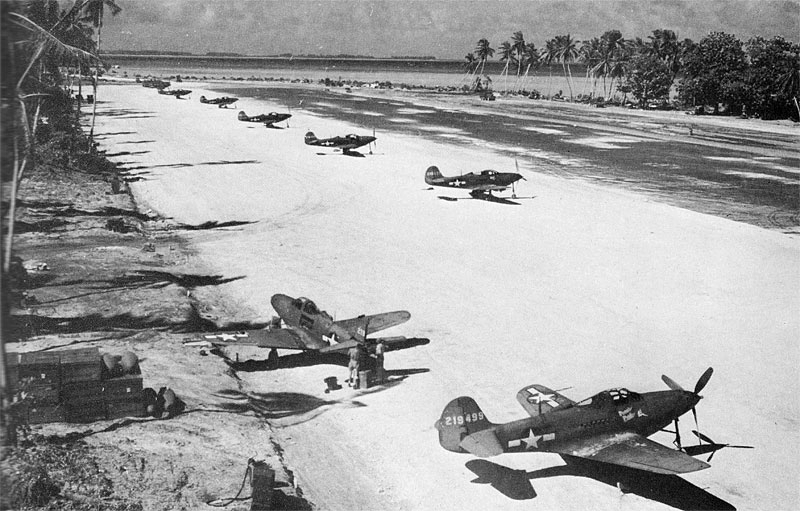
P-39Qs of the 46th Fighter Sq at Makin Island in December 1943.

On 12 February 1942, the unit was redesignated the 15th Pursuit Group (Interceptor). Several months later, the unit was redesignated the 15th Fighter Group. That summer, the group's mission changed. Although defense of the islands continued to be an important responsibility, continuing to provide combat training for fighter pilots with the Bell P-39 Airacobra, Curtiss P-40 Warhawk and the Republic P-47D Thunderbolt became the primary mission of the elements of the group remaining in Hawaii for the next two years. In August 1942, the 12th Fighter Squadron, which had deployed to the Southwest Pacific Theater and been attached to VII Fighter Command, was assigned to the group, although the squadron remained at Christmas Island during its assignment. The group also deployed other squadrons to the Central and South Pacific for operations against Japanese forces.

The following March, the 6th Night Fighter Squadron was assigned to the group. During this assignment, which lasted a little more than a year, the 6th kept detachments of its Douglas P-70 Havocs and Northrop P-61 Black Widows on Guadalcanal and New Guinea. In March 1943, the 78th Fighter Squadron was assigned to the group. The 78th in effect replaced the 46th Fighter Squadron, which moved to Makin Island and Canton Island for operations against the Japanese, although the 46th remained assigned to the group until June 1944. In September, the 45th squadron also deployed to the western Pacific for combat operations, leaving the 47th and 78th with group headquarters in Hawaii.

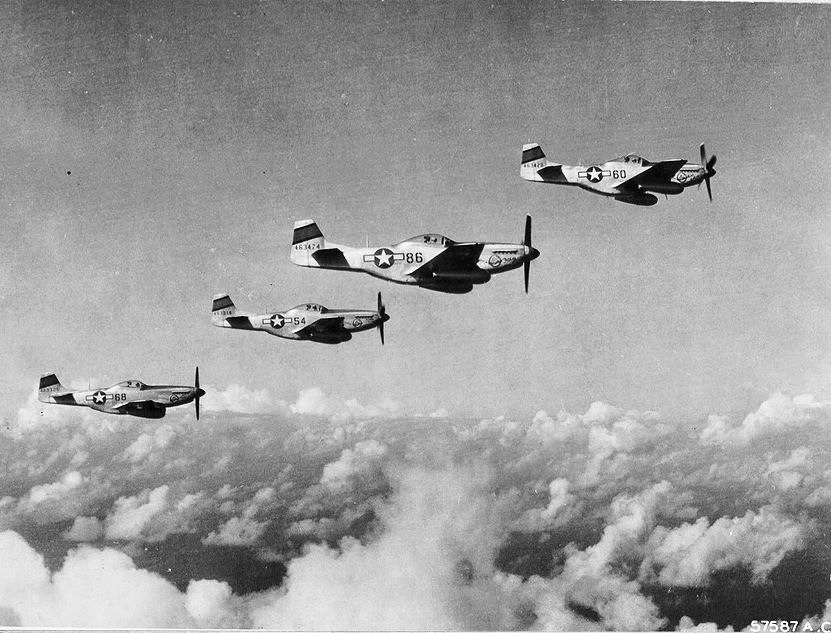
45th Fighter Squadron P-51Ds on an escort mission in June 1945 (Note: North American P-51D-20-NA Mustangs serials 44-63325 44-63314 44-63474 44-63428 are pictured.)

Then, in April 1944, the deployed elements of the 15th Fighter Group returned to Hawaii and began training for very long range bomber escort missions, obtaining North American P-51 Mustangs later in the year. In January 1945, ordered into combat, the group left Hawaii for Saipan in the Marianas Islands, remaining there until a landing strip could be secured by the Marines on Iwo Jima. The first fighter aircraft to arrive at Iwo Jima were P-51s of the 15th's 47th Fighter Squadron the morning of 6 March, with the 45th and 78th Squadrons following the next day. They supported Marine ground units by bombing and strafing cave entrances, trenches, troop concentrations, and storage areas. By the middle of March, the group also began strikes against enemy airfields, shipping, and military installations in the Bonin Islands.

On 7 April 1945, the 15th flew its first Very Long Range (VLR) mission to Japan, providing fighter escort for the Boeing B-29 Superfortress bombers that attacked the Nakajima aircraft plant near Tokyo, and was awarded the Distinguished Unit Citation. In late April and early May that year, the 15th struck Japanese airfields on Kyūshū to curtail the enemy's suicide attacks against the invasion force on Okinawa and also hit enemy troop trains, small factories, gun positions, and hangars in the Bonins and Japan.

During the summer of 1945, the 15th Fighter Group (along with the 21st Fighter Group and the VII Fighter Command) were reassigned to Twentieth Air Force. The group continued its fighter sweeps against Japanese airfields and other targets, in addition to flying long-range B-29 Superfortress escort missions to Japanese cities, until the end of the war. After the war, the group remained on lwo Jima until 25 November 1945, when it transferred (without personnel and equipment) to Bellows Field, Hawaii. There it absorbed the personnel and equipment of the 508th Fighter Group. On 8 February 1946, the unit moved to Wheeler Field, where it remained until inactivated on 15 October 1946. Its personnel and equipment were transferred to the 81st Fighter Group, which assumed its mission.

Aerial Victories	Number	Note
Group Hq	3	(Note: Victories for the 6th Night Fighter Squadron, 12th Fighter Squadron and 46th Fighter Squadron include only victories credited while assigned or attached to the 15th Fighter Group.)
6th Night Fighter Squadron	20
12th Fighter Squadron	5
45th Fighter Squadron	33.5
46th Fighter Squadron	7
47th Fighter Squadron	43
78th Fighter Squadron	39
Group Total	150.5

=== Air Defense Command ===
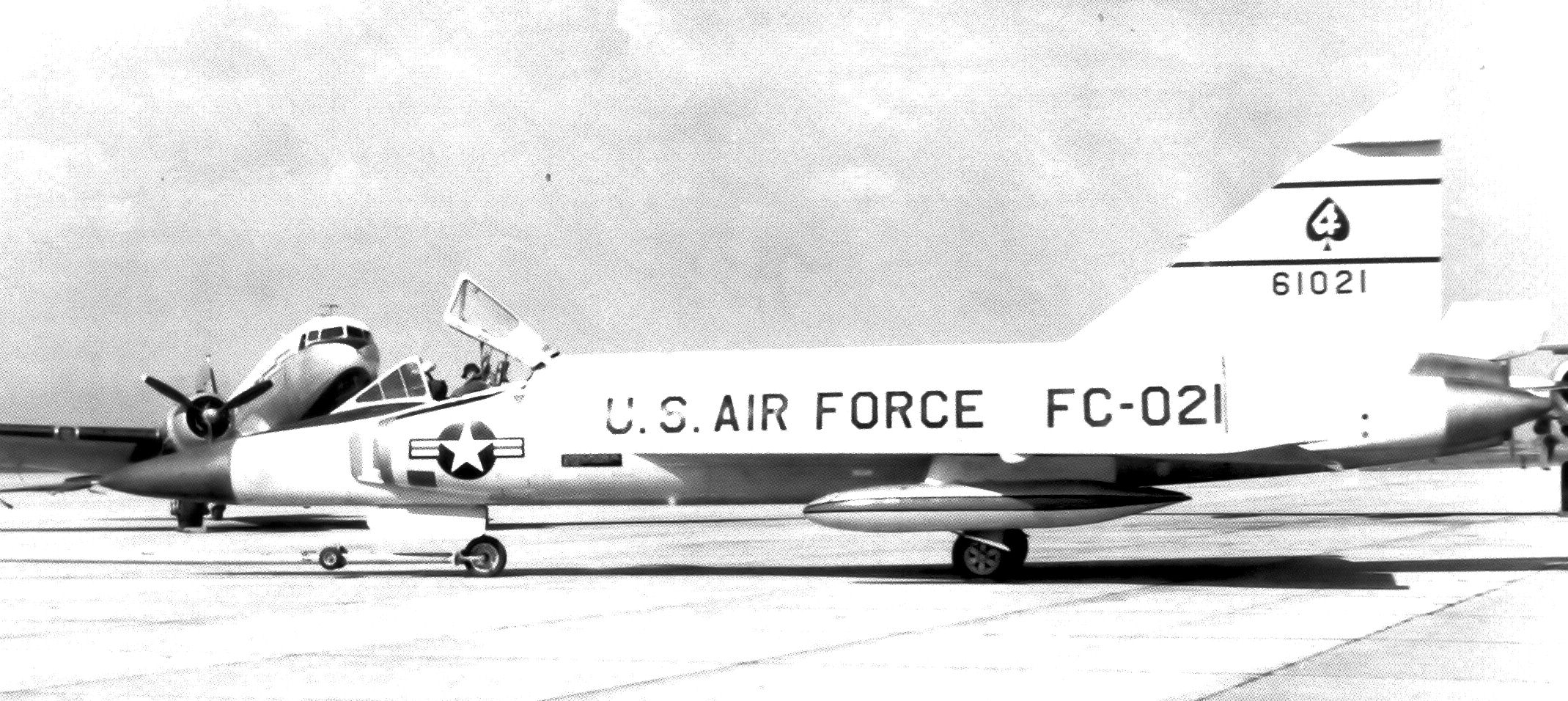
47th Fighter-Interceptor Squadron Convair F-102A at Niagara Falls Municipal Airport (Note: Convair F-102A-55-CO Delta Dagger serial 56-1021 is pictured in 1959.)

The 15th was again activated on 18 August 1955 as the 15th Fighter Group (Air Defense) at Niagara Falls Municipal Airport, New York, where it replaced the 518th Air Defense Group as a result of Air Defense Command (ADC)'s Project Arrow, which was designed to bring back on the active list fighter units which had compiled memorable records during the two World Wars. There it was responsible for the air defense of an area that included Western and Northern New York and parts of Ontario, Canada. It was reunited with one of its former units, now designated the 47th Fighter-Interceptor Squadron (FIS), which was already at Niagara Falls, where it had been assigned to the 518th. The group was also assigned several support squadrons to perform its mission as USAF host unit for the active duty portions of Niagara Falls Airport. (later 15th USAF Dispensary)

The 47th FIS was equipped with radar equipped and rocket armed North American F-86D Sabres. In the fall of 1957, the squadron upgraded to data link equipped F-86Ls and later, by the summer of 1958 to Convair F-102 Delta Dagger aircraft The group performed air defense operations for the 4707th Air Defense Wing and Syracuse Air Defense Sector until July 1960, when it was discontinued. Its mission was assumed by units of ADC's Air National Guard augmentation program.

=== Vietnam War Error ===
On 1 July 1962, the 15th Tactical Fighter Wing (TFW) was organized by Tactical Air Command at MacDill Air Force Base, Florida and assigned to the 836th Air Division. Operational squadrons of the wing and squadron tail codes were:

- 45th Tactical Fighter Squadron (FC)
- 46th Tactical Fighter Squadron (FD)
- 47th Tactical Fighter Squadron (FE)
- 43d Tactical Fighter Squadron (FB)(Activated on 8 January 1964 as part of a wing transition from three squadrons of 25 aircraft each to four squadrons of 18 aircraft each.)
- 421st Tactical Fighter Squadron (briefly assigned in 1967 on redeployment from Southeast Asia (SEA), then moved to Homestead AFB, Florida

The wing was initially equipped with the obsolescent Republic F-84F Thunderstreak which were obtained from Air National Guard units. In 1964 the wing upgraded to the McDonnell-Douglas F-4C Phantom II. The 15 TFW was the second wing to be equipped with the F-4.

The mission of the 15 TFW was to conduct tactical fighter combat crew training. The wing participated in a variety of exercises, operations and readiness tests of Tactical Air Command. The wing trained pilots and provided logistical support for the 12th Tactical Fighter Wing. It was reorganized as a mission-capable unit at the time of the Cuban Missile Crisis of 1962, returning afterwards to a training mission.

With the departure of the 12 TFW in 1965, the 15 TFW's mission became acting as a replacement training unit for F-4 aircrews prior to their deployment to Southeast Asia. The wing deployed 16 F-4s at Seymour Johnson Air Force Base, North Carolina, during the Pueblo crisis in 1968.

In 1965, the wing deployed its 43d, 45th, 46th and 47th Tactical Fighter Squadrons to SEA, where they participated in the air defense commitment for the Philippines from Clark AB and flew combat missions from Cam Rahn Bay Air Base in South Vietnam and Ubon Royal Thai Air Force Base in Thailand. Members of the 45 TFS achieved the first U.S. Air Force aerial victories of the Vietnam War when they destroyed two MIGs on 10 July 1965. Captains Thomas S. Roberts, Ronald C. Anderson, Kenneth E. Holcombe, and Arthur C. Clark received credit for these kills. The 43d TFS was reassigned to Elmendorf AFB, Alaska on 4 January 1970.

Beginning in October 1968, when the 4424th Combat Crew Training Squadron (CCTS) was organized, the wing began Martin B-57G Canberra night intruder tactical bomber aircrew training. On 8 February 1969, the 13th Bombardment Squadron, was organized as a tactical B-57 squadron (Tail Code: FK) Night Intruder tactical bomber aircrew training. The squadron and eleven aircraft deployed to Ubon RTAFB, Thailand on 1 October 1970. Three B-57Gs were left behind at MacDill with the 4424th CCTS as trainers.

In 1969, the wing assumed host USAF responsibility for MacDill from the 836th AD and was assigned the 15th Combat Support Group to carry out this mission. The 15th was inactivated on 1 October 1970, and was replaced by the 1st Tactical Fighter Wing when the 1st TFW was reassigned from ADC to Tactical Air Command and moved from Hamilton AFB, CA to MacDill. The 4424th CCTS remained at MacDill, coming under the 1st TFW and finally discontinuing on 30 June 1972 with the return of the B-57Gs to the United States (to Kansas ANG).

=== Pacific Air Forces ===
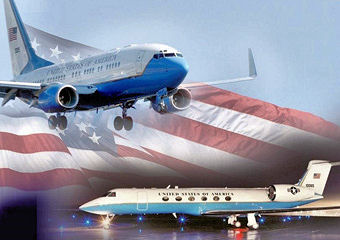
Special mission aircraft of the wing's 65th Airlift Squadron

One year later, on 20 October 1971, the 15th Tactical Fighter Wing was redesignated the 15th Air Base Wing and activated at Hickam AFB, Hawaii on 1 November 1971. Assigned to Pacific Air Forces (PACAF), the 15th assumed the personnel, equipment, mission, and duties previously performed by the 6486th Air Base Wing, which was simultaneously discontinued. This reactivation reestablished the organization in Hawaii, where the 15th Pursuit Group was formed in 1940, and the lineage, history and honors of the 15th Fighter Group were bestowed on the Wing. (Note: This temporary bestowal ended in 1984 when the 15th Air Base Wing was consolidated with the 15th Fighter Group (Air Defense), merging the two into a single unit. Ravenstein, Appendix V, USAF Bestowed History, pp. 315–17.)

The 15th Air Base Wing managed Hickam, Wheeler, Dillingham, and Johnston Island Air Force Bases, Bellows Air Force Station, and several smaller subsidiary bases. It provided base level support for headquarters PACAF and more than 100 tenant organizations. Its 15th Operations Squadron provided special airlift for the Commander in Chief, Pacific (CINCPAC), and the USAF and US Army components of Pacific Command, initially with VC-118 aircraft until inactivating in 1975, when the wing absorbed its assets. Its 9th Airborne Command and Control Squadron provided airborne command and control support for CINCPAC. Responsibility for Johnston Island subsequently transferred to the Defense Nuclear Agency on 1 July 1973; but on that same date, the 15th ABW assumed operational responsibility for Wake Island. Dillingham later transferred to Army control on 27 February 1975, as did Wheeler AFB on 1 November 1991. In 1999, the 15th ABW once again assumed responsibility for Johnston Island. Operational control of Wake Island transferred to the 36th Air Base Wing (13th Air Force), Andersen Air Force Base, Guam, on 1 October 2000.

From April to September 1975, the wing sheltered over 93,000 orphans, evacuees, and refugees from Southeast Asia as part of Operation Babylift and Operation New Life. In 1980 the wing participated in Project Lagoon, a program to remove radioactive waste from Enewetak Atoll.

On 13 April 1992 the 15th Operations Group was activated as the wing implemented the USAF objective wing organization. Upon activation, the group assumed was reassigned the wing's operational squadrons and the newly activated 15th Operations Support Squadron. It also managed operational matters at Hickam and Bellows in Hawaii and Wake Island Airfield. Its two flying squadrons provided airborne command and control and airlift for high-ranking officials. The group also provided command and control for the defense of the Hawaiian Islands, including tactical control of Hawaii Air National Guard alert F-15 aircraft.

On 28 April 2003, the wing was redesignated the 15th Airlift Wing and begun preparation to stand up a first-of-its-kind active duty/associate Air National Guard C-17 Globemaster III organization. Almost three years later, on 8 February 2006 the wing welcomed in the first of eight C-17 Globemaster III cargo jets changing Hickam's identity and mission from strictly en route support to include performing local and worldwide airlift operations in support of combat and humanitarian missions.

On 18 May 2010, the wing was redesignated the 15th Wing in anticipation of the addition of air refueling and fighters to its airlift mission, which occurred on 23 July, when the 96th Air Refueling Squadron was assigned to the wing's operations group. Four days earlier, its 15th Mission Support Group was inactivated as Hickam Air Force Base became part of Joint Base Pearl Harbor–Hickam and the US Navy assumed most support responsibility for the installation. In October, the wing added Lockheed Martin F-22 Raptors to the aircraft it flies when the 19th Fighter Squadron moved from Joint Base Elmendorf-Richardson, Alaska to become an active duty associate unit of the Hawaiian Air National Guard's 199th Fighter Squadron.

== Lineage ==
- Constituted as the 15th Pursuit Group (Fighter) on 22 November 1940

Activated on 1 December 1940
Redesignated: 15th Pursuit Group (Interceptor) on 12 February 1942
Redesignated: 15th Fighter Group (Single Engine) on 15 May 1942
Inactivated on 15 October 1946.

- Redesignated 15th Fighter Group (Air Defense) on 20 June 1955

Activated on 18 August 1955
Discontinued and inactivated on 1 July 1960
Consolidated with the 15th Air Base Wing as the 15th Air Base Wing on 31 January 1984

- Constituted as the 15th Tactical Fighter Wing and activated on 17 April 1962 (not organized)

Organized on 1 July 1962
Inactivated on 1 October 1970

- Redesignated 15th Air Base Wing on 20 October 1971

Activated on 1 November 1971
Consolidated with the 15th Fighter Group (Air Defense) on 31 January 1984
Redesignated 15th Airlift Wing on 28 April 2003
Redesignated 15th Wing on 18 May 2010

=== Assignments ===
- 14th Pursuit Wing, 1 December 1940
- 7th Interceptor Command (later VII Fighter Command), 23 January 1942
- United States Strategic Air Forces in the Pacific, 16 July 1945
- VII Fighter Command, 5 August 1945
- Pacific Air Command, US Army, 25 November 1945 (Attached to 7th Fighter Wing)
- 7th Fighter Wing, 1 January 1946
- Seventh Air Force, 1 March – 15 October 1946
- 4707th Air Defense Wing, 18 August 1955
- 30th Air Division, 8 July 1956
- Syracuse Air Defense Sector, 1 September 1958 – 1 July 1960
- Tactical Air Command, 17 April 1962 (not organized)
- 836th Air Division, 1 July 1962 – 1 October 1970
- Pacific Air Forces, 1 November 1971
- Thirteenth Air Force, 6 October 2006
- Pacific Air Forces, 28 September 2012 – present

=== Components ===
Groups

- 15th Operations Group: 13 April 1992 – present
- 15th Combat Support Group (later 15th Support Group, 15th Mission Support Group): 8 June 1969 – 1 October 1970, 13 April 1992 – 14 May 2010
- 15th Logistics Group (later 15th Maintenance Group: 13 April 1992 – 11 July 2003, 22 July 2005 – present
- 15th Medical Group (formerly USAF Dispensary, Hickam; USAF Clinic, Hickam), 1 November 1971 – present
- 647th Air Base Group, 14 May 2020 - present

Operational Squadrons

- 6th Night Fighter Squadron: attached 6 March 1943 – 25 March 1943, assigned 26 March 1943 – 5 June 1944; attached 1 September 1944 – 30 September 1944
- 9th Airborne Command and Control Squadron: 1 November 1971 – 31 March 1992
- 12th Fighter Squadron: 23 August 1942 – 1 December 1942
- 13th Bombardment Squadron, Tactical: 8 February 1969 – 1 October 1970 (detached 15 September – 1 October 1970)
- 15th Operations Squadron: 1 November 1971 – 30 June 1975
- 22d Tactical Air Support Squadron: 1 November 1971 – 4 April 1980
- 43d Tactical Fighter Squadron: 8 January 1964 – 15 July 1970 (detached 17 August 1965 – c. 4 January 1966)
- 45th Pursuit Squadron (later 45th Fighter Squadron, 45th Tactical Fighter Squadron): 1 December 1940 – 15 October 1946, 1 July 1962 – 1 October 1970 (detached 4 April 1965 – 10 August 1965)
- 46th Pursuit Squadron (later 46th Fighter Squadron, 46th Tactical Fighter Squadron): 1 December 1940 – 24 April 1944, 1 July 1962 – 1 October 1970 (detached 11 May 1965 – 22 August 1965 and 1 November 1965 – 10 November 1965)
- 47th Pursuit Squadron (later 47th Fighter Squadron, 47th Fighter-Interceptor Squadron, 47th Tactical Fighter Squadron): 1 December 1940 – 15 October 1946; 18 August 1955 – 1 July 1960, 1 July 1962 – 1 October 1970 (detached 22 July – 27 November 1965)
- 65th Airlift Squadron: 10 March – 13 April 1992
- 78th Fighter Squadron: attached 6 March 1943 – 17 March 1943; assigned 26 March 1943 – 15 October 1946 (detached 26 March 1943 – 10 April 1943)
- 421st Tactical Fighter Squadron: 25 April – 1 July 1967
- 4424th Combat Crew Training Squadron: 15 October 1968 – 1 October 1970

Support and Maintenance Squadrons

- 15th Air Base Squadron: 18 August 1955 – 1 July 1960, 1 November 1971 – 1 November 1991
- 15th Armament & Electronics Maintenance Squadron (later 15th Avionics Maintenance Squadron): 1 July 1962 – 10 February 1968, 1 November 1971 – 1 July 1986
- 15th Comptroller Squadron (previously 15th Comptroller Flight): 13 November 1995 – present
- 15th Consolidated Aircraft Maintenance Squadron (later 15th Field Maintenance Squadron, 15th Consolidated Aircraft Maintenance Squadron): 8 July 1957 – 1 July 1960, 1 July 1962 – 1 July 1971, 1 November 1971 – 13 April 1992
- 15th Materiel Squadron: 18 August 1955 – 1 July 1960
- 15th Organizational Maintenance Squadron: 1 July 1962 – 1 November 1966, 1 November 1981 – 1 July 1986
- 15th Security Police Squadron: 1 November 1971 – 13 April 1992
- 15th Services Squadron: 1 November 1971 – 13 April 1992
- 15th Supply Squadron: 8 June 1969 – 1 October 1970, 1 November 1971 – 13 April 1992
- 15th Transportation Squadron: 8 June 1969 – 1 October 1970, 1 November 1971 – 13 April 1992
- 415th Munitions Maintenance Sq: 15 May 1963 – 20 February 1968
- 747th Cyberspace Squadron: 14 May 2010 - present. Redesignated as the 747th Communications Squadron in June 2025.

Other

- 15th USAF Infirmary (later 15th USAF Dispensary, 15th Tactical Hospital): 18 August 1955 – 1 July 1960, 8 July 1969 – 1 October 1970

=== Stations ===
- Wheeler Field, Territory of Hawaii, 1 December 1940<
- Bellows Field, Territory of Hawaii, 3 June 1944 – 5 February 1945
- South Field (Iwo Jima), 6 March 1945
- Bellows Field, Territory of Hawaii, 25 November 1945
- Wheeler Field, Territory of Hawaii, 9 February - 15 October 1946
- Niagara Falls Municipal Airport, New York, 18 August 1955 – 1 July 1960
- MacDill Air Force Base, Florida, 1 July 1962 – 1 October 1970
- Hickam Air Force Base, (part of Joint Base Pearl Harbor–Hickam), Hawaii, 1 November 1971 – present

=== Aircraft ===
- Curtiss A-12 Shrike, 1940–1942
- Grumman OA-9 Goose, 1940–1942
- Boeing P-26 Peashooter, 1940–1942
- Curtiss P-36 Hawk, 1940–1942
- Martin B-12, 1941–1942
- Bell P-39 Airacobra, 1941–1944
- Curtiss P-40 Warhawk, 1941–1944
- Republic P-47 Thunderbolt, 1943–1945, 1945–1946, 1946
- Douglas P-70 Havoc, 1943–1944
- Douglas A-24 Banshee, 1944
- North American P-51 Mustang, 1944–1946
- Northrop P-61 Black Widow, 1944
- Douglas A-26 Invader, 1946
- North American F-86D Sabre, 1955–1957
- North American F-86L Sabre, 1957–1958
- Convair F-102 Delta Dagger, 1958–1960
- Republic F-84F Thunderstreak, 1962–1964
- Lockheed T-33 T-Bird, 1962–1970, 1972–1987
- McDonnell F-4 Phantom II, 1964–1970
- Martin B-57G Canberra, 1968–1970
- Boeing EC-135, 1971–1992
- Cessna O-2 Skymaster, 1972–1980
- Boeing C-135 Stratolifter, 1992–2003
- C-37 Gulfstream V, 2002–present
- Boeing C-40 Clipper, 2003–present
- McDonnell Douglas C-17 Globemaster III, 2006–present
- Boeing KC-135 Stratotanker, 2010–2015
- Lockheed Martin F-22 Raptor, 2010–present

=== Awards and campaigns ===
Award streamer	Award	Dates	Notes
	Distinguished Unit Citation	7 April 1945	Japan, 15th Fighter Group
	Air Force Outstanding Unit Award	1 January 1965 – 1 June 1966	15th Tactical Fighter Wing
	Air Force Outstanding Unit Award	1 January 1969 – 31 December 1969	15th Tactical Fighter Wing
	Air Force Outstanding Unit Award	4 April 1975 – 3 September 1975	15th Air Base Wing
	Air Force Outstanding Unit Award	25 February 1986 – 25 March 1986	15th Air Base Wing
	Air Force Outstanding Unit Award	1 July 1989 – 30 June 1991	15th Air Base Wing
	Air Force Outstanding Unit Award	1 July 1991 – 30 June 1993	15th Air Base Wing
	Air Force Outstanding Unit Award	1 October 1993 – 30 September 1995	15th Air Base Wing
	Air Force Outstanding Unit Award	1 October 1995 – 1 August 1997	15th Air Base Wing
	Air Force Outstanding Unit Award	2 August 1997 – 1 August 1999	15th Air Base Wing
	Air Force Outstanding Unit Award	29 November 1999 – 30 November 2001	15th Air Base Wing
	Air Force Outstanding Unit Award	1 November 2002 – 31 October 2004	15th Air Base Wing (later 15th Airlift Wing)
	Air Force Outstanding Unit Award	1 November 2004 – 31 October 2006	15th Airlift Wing
	Air Force Outstanding Unit Award	1 November 2006 – 31 October 2007	15th Airlift Wing

Campaign Streamer	Campaign	Dates	Notes
	Central Pacific	7 December 1941 – 6 December 1943	15th Fighter Group
	Air Offensive, Japan	17 April 1942 – 2 September 1945	15th Fighter Group

== See also ==
- List of B-57 units of the United States Air Force
- List of Douglas A-26 Invader operators
- List of Sabre and Fury units in the US military
- List of United States Air Force airborne command and control squadrons
- McDonnell Douglas F-4 Phantom II non-U.S. operators
