= Crimson Circle (Loyola Marymount University) =

American service organization

The Crimson Circle is a service organization at Loyola Marymount University under Student Affairs in the office of The Center for Service and Action.

== Mission ==
The Crimson Circle is an organization founded in 1929, characterized by its emphasis on service, honor, brotherhood, tradition, and faith. It maintains a tradition of selective and diverse membership. The group engages in activities that support Loyola Marymount University and broader local and global communities, with a stated commitment to social justice. Its guiding principle is expressed in the phrase “men for and with others.

== History ==
The Crimson Circle was established at Loyola University in 1929 to assist the Jesuit Dean of Students with the enforcement of the Student Conduct Code at student assemblies and at athletic events. Appointed by the Student Council, they administered public punishment to those students found guilty of infraction of the laws and traditions of the University. It was composed of fifteen men from the sophomore, junior and senior classes. Father Lorenzo M. Malone, SJ, was the first moderator.

As Loyola University continued to develop and its needs changed, the purpose of Crimson Circle also changed and developed. By the 1940s, Crimson Circle shed its responsibilities in enforcing the Student Conduct Code and became an honor society.

During the 1960s, Crimson Circle began to resemble the organization it is today. Crimson Circle became a service organization committed to the University to promote programs of the Associated Students of Loyola University, the President's Office, University Relations, and Admissions.

Today, Crimson Circle's mission is to serve at Loyola Marymount University and the surrounding communities of Los Angeles. Since its foundation, members of Crimson Circle have been recognized for leadership, loyalty, generous service, good academic standing, and high spirit.

The uniform colors of Crimson Circle remain crimson and grey, reflecting the old school colors of Loyola University. Crimson Circle is composed of 35 sophomore, junior, and senior men. Its current President is John Kassabian.

Moderators of Crimson Circle have included: Fr. Al Kilp, SJ; Fr. James Erps, SJ; and Fr. Wayne Negrete, SJ. Fr. Richard Robin, SJ. Its current moderator and chaplain is Fr. Sean Dempsey, SJ.

The Crimson Circle remains an important part of the Jesuit history and tradition at Loyola Marymount University.

== Present ==
In 2014 Crimson Circle has made a commitment to visit, tutor, and mentor students at St. Columbkille Catholic School and Urban Compass on a weekly basis. In the Spring of 2014, Crimson Circle was awarded the Riordan Community Action Grant to provide Urban Compass with an 8-week program focused on education of the whole person. Notable annual events served include the Down Syndrome Association of Los Angeles’ Buddy Walk, LMU’s Fright Night, and LMU’s Special Games. Crimson Circle continues to cultivate a growing presence at Midnight Mission to benefit the homeless population in Skid Row. In partnership with Belles Service Organization, Crimson Circle hosts the annual LMU Charity Ball which raises funds for their respective service placements.

In addition, Crimson Circle has been a driving force of support for the successful biannual LMU Blood & Bone Marrow Drives done in conjunction with CSA and the UCLA Blood and Platelet Center. In 2023, the Crimson Circle was honored with the Practice Ignatian Values Award at LMU's Student Academic, Service, and Leadership Awards Convocation; this award was a result of the Circle's efforts for their most recent blood drive, which raised over 174 pints of blood for blood and bone marrow patients.

In 2023, The Crimson Circle began working with Grace Hopper STEM Academy to tutor and mentor students after school, as well as establishing a mentorship program for male students at the academy.

== Traditions & anniversaries ==
The Crimson Circle has had many traditions throughout its existence. Most notably:

- Catch That Bunny
  - LMU Magazine Highlights of Catch That Bunny 2014
  - Catch That Bunny 2011
- Reunions
  - Slides from The Crimson Circle's 80th Reunion

== Awards ==
- Riordan Empowerment Fund - The Riordan Foundation - November 2014 ($500 grant for Health/Fitness Fair at St. Columbkille School)
- Volunteer Honor Plaque - Buddy Walk at City Hall by DSA - October 2014
- Riordan Community Action Grant - The Riordan Foundation - February 2014 ($2,500 grant for programming at Urban Compass)
  - See Crimson Blog for More Info: http://matthewsugidono.blogspot.com/2014_05_01_archive.html
- Volunteer Honor Plaque - Urban Compass - 2014
- Practice Ignatian Values Award, LMU - 2023
