= 514th Fighter-Interceptor Squadron =

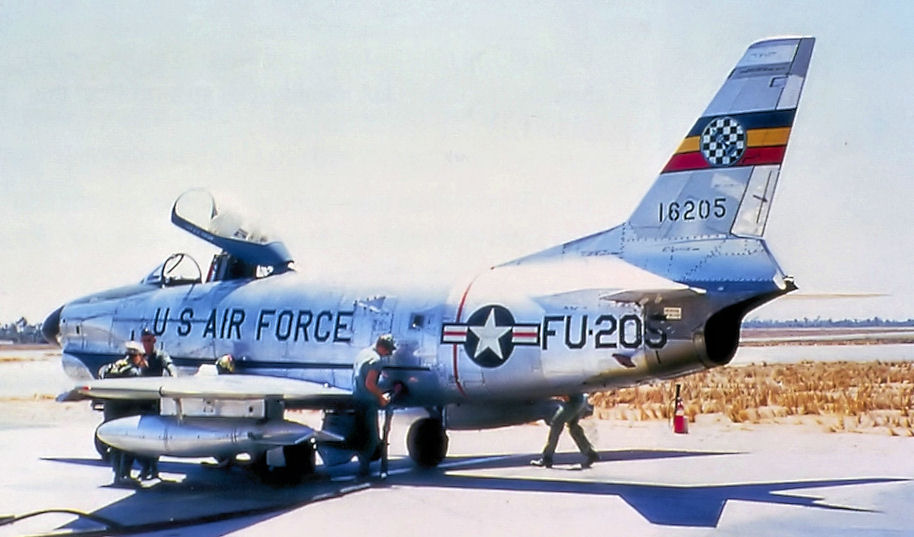
- 514th F-86D Sabre about 1958 (Note: Aircraft is North American F-86D-35-NA Sabre, serial 51-6205. This plane crashed on 29 April 1959 near Rhein-Main Air Base, Germany. Baugher, Joe (6 May 2023). "1951 USAF Serial Numbers". Joe Baugher.)
- Active: 1943–1946; 1952–1961
- Country: United States
- Branch: United States Air Force
- Role: Fighter interceptor
- Engagements: European Theater of Operations
- Decorations: Distinguished Unit Citation; Air Force Outstanding Unit Award

Insignia
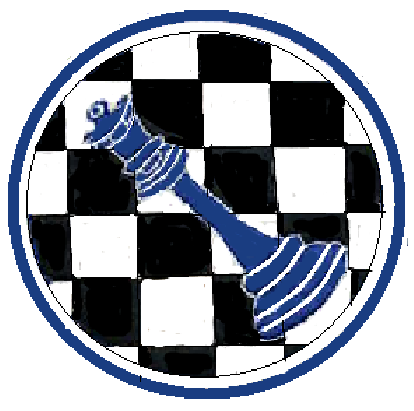
- Patch with 514th Fighter-Interceptor Squadron emblem (Note: Approved 1 March 1955. Description: on a disc, checky, white and black, within a double border, blue and of the first [color mentioned], a chess queen of the third [color mentioned], detail white.)

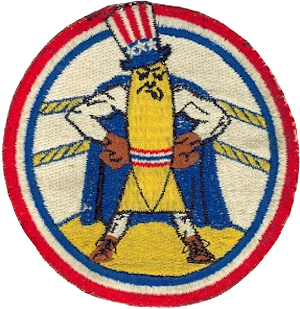
- 514th Fighter Squadron emblem (World War II)
- World War II fuselage code: O7

The 514th Fighter-Interceptor Squadron is an inactive United States Air Force unit. Its last assignment was with the 86th Air Division, based at Ramstein Air Base, Germany, where it was inactivated on 8 January 1961.

The squadron was first activated as the 630th Bombardment Squadron in 1943. While retaining its mission as a ground attack unit, it became the 514th Fighter-Bomber Squadron a few months after activating. After training in the United States, it moved to the European Theater of Operations in the spring of 1944. It entered combat soon thereafter, and following D-Day, moved to the European continent, where it gave close air support to American ground forces advancing across Europe. It earned two Distinguished Unit Citations for its actions during the war. Following V-E Day, the squadron served in the Army of Occupation until 1946, when it was inactivated and its personnel and equipment transferred to another unit.

The squadron was reactivated in 1952, when it replaced an Air National Guard unit that had been mobilized for the Korean War. The following year it assumed an air defense mission and continued with that mission until inactivated.

== History ==
The squadron was first activated as the 630th Bombardment Squadron at Key Field, Mississippi on 1 March 1943. It was one of the four original squadrons of the 406th Bombardment Group and was initially equipped with a variety of attack, pursuit, and trainer aircraft. Although its mission did not substantially change, the squadron became the 514th Fighter-Bomber Squadron in August. It moved to Congaree Army Air Field, South Carolina and equipped with Republic P-47 Thunderbolts before the end of the year. The 514th trained with its "Jugs" until March 1944, when it departed the United States for the European Theater of Operations.

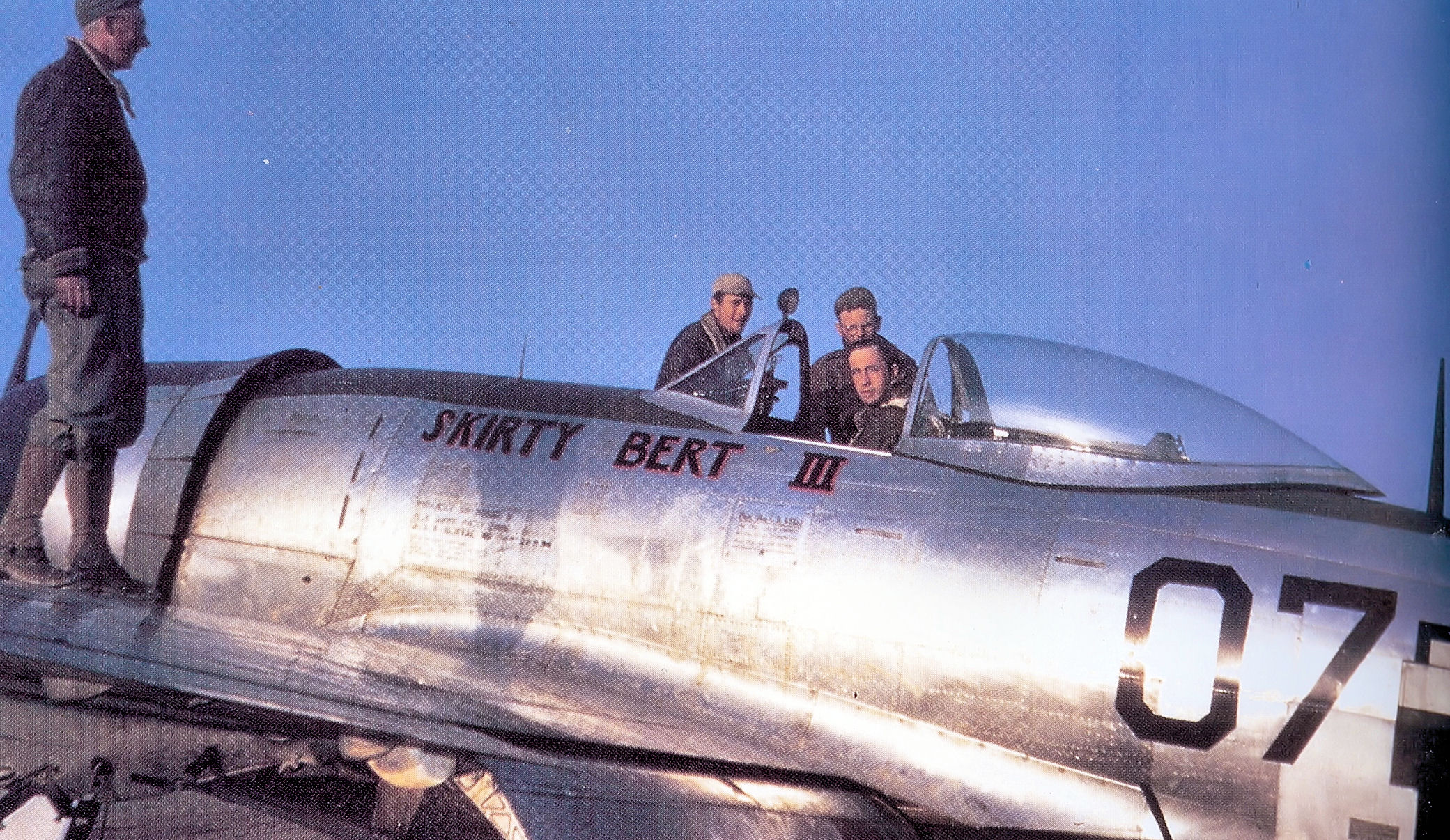
514th Fighter Squadron P-47 Thunderbolt (Note: Aircraft is Republic P-47D Thunderbolt Skirty Bert III at Münster-Handorf Airfield, Germany in April 1945.)

The squadron arrived at RAF Ashford in England in early April and flew its first combat mission the following month, preparing for Operation Overlord, the Allied invasion of Normandy. It attacked military airfields, bridges and marshalling yards in France. On D-Day, the squadron flew patrols in the vicinity of the invasion beaches and armed reconnaissance and dive bombing missions.

The squadron supported Operation Cobra, the Allied breakthrough at Saint-Lo on 25 July, then moved to Tour-en-Bessin Airfield in France a few days later. The 514th participated in the reduction of Saint-Malo and Brest, France and supported the drive across France. On 7 September, flying from Saint-Léonard Airfield, the squadron operated with the other units of the 406th Fighter Group in destroying a column of tanks, armored vehicles and motor transport that were trying to escape to southeastern France through the Belfort Gap. This attack earned the squadron the Distinguished Unit Citation (DUC). The squadron cooperated with ground forces and flew air interdiction sorties in the area of the Mosel and Saar Rivers.

When the Germans launched the counterattack that resulted in the Battle of the Bulge in December 1944, the squadron shifted operations to the Ardennes to relive the embattled garrison at Bastogne. For four days in late December, the squadron flew attacks on German vehicles, gun emplacements and defensive positions close to Bastogne, for which it was awarded a second DUC. The squadron flew escort, interdiction, and air support missions in the Ruhr Valley early in 1945 and to assist Allied ground forces in the drive to and across the Rhine.

Following, V-E Day, the squadron moved to AAF Station Nordholz, Germany, where it became part of the Army of Occupation. The squadron was inactivated on 20 August 1946, and its personnel and equipment were transferred to the 527th Fighter Squadron. which was activated the same day.

=== Air defense in Europe ===
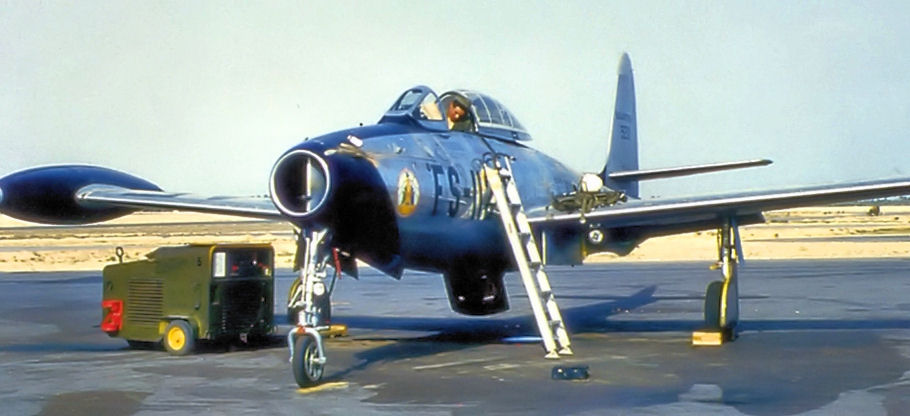
514th Fighter-Bomber Squadron F-84G Thunderjet (Note: The photo caption states the aircraft is Republic F-84G-10-RE Thunderjet, serial 51-1112 at RAF Manston in 1953. Only the last 3 digits of the "buzz number" are visible in the photo, so this aircraft may have a different serial number. Baugher states that 51-1112 was destroyed in a crash near Chitose Air Base Japan on 29 October 1952. Baugher, Joe (6 May 2023). "1951 USAF Serial Numbers". Joe Baugher.)

The squadron returned to its Fighter-Bomber designation and was activated in July 1952 at RAF Manston, England, where it replaced the 167th Fighter-Bomber Squadron, a West Virginia Air National Guard unit that had been mobilized for the Korean War. The 514th assumed the mission, personnel and Republic F-84 Thunderjets of the 167th, which was returned to state control. In late 1953, the squadron converted to North American F-86D Sabres. In 1954, the squadron was designated the 514th Fighter-Interceptor Squadron.

When the 406th Fighter-Interceptor Wing reorganized in May 1956, the 406th Fighter-Interceptor Group was inactivated and the squadron assigned directly to wing headquarters. (Note: Under this plan, called the "dual deputy organization" flying squadrons reported to the wing Deputy Commander for Operations and maintenance squadrons reported to the wing Deputy Commander for Maintenance.) In February 1958, the 406th Wing began phasing down its operations as it prepared for inactivation. In connection with this drawdown, the squadron moved to Ramstein-Landstuhl Air Base when the 406th inactivated on 15 May 1958 and was reassigned to the 86th Fighter-Interceptor Wing. The squadron was inactivated on 8 January 1961, one of the last two F-86D squadrons in United States Air Forces in Europe.

== Lineage ==
- Constituted as the 630th Bombardment Squadron (Dive) on 4 February 1943

Activated on 1 March 1943
Redesignated 514th Fighter-Bomber Squadron on 10 August 1943
Redesignated 514th Fighter Squadron on 30 May 1944
Inactivated on 20 August 1946

- Redesignated 514th Fighter-Bomber Squadron on 25 June 1952

Activated on 10 July 1952
Redesignated 514th Fighter-Interceptor Squadron on 1 April 1954
Discontinued and inactivated on 8 January 1961

=== Assignments ===
- 406th Bombardment Group (later 406th Fighter-Bomber Group, 406th Fighter Group), 1 March 1943 – 20 August 1946
- 406th Fighter-Bomber Group (later 406th Fighter-Interceptor Group), 10 July 1952
- 406th Fighter-Interceptor Wing, 1 May 1956
- 86th Fighter-Interceptor Wing (later 86th Air Division), 25 April 1958 – 8 January 1961

=== Stations ===
- Key Field, Mississippi, 1 March 1943
- Congaree Army Air Field, South Carolina, 18 September 1943 – 13 March 1944
- RAF Ashford (AAF-417), England, 5 April 1944
- Tour-en-Bessin Airfield (A-13), France, c. 19 July 1944
- Cretteville Airfield (A-14), France, 17 August 1944
- Saint-Léonard Airfield (A-36), France, 4 September 1944
- Mourmelon-le-Grand Airfield (A-80), France, 24 September 1944
- Metz Airfield (Y-34), France, c. 31 January 1945
- Asch Airfield (Y-29), Belgium, c. 6 February 1945
- Münster-Handorf Airfield (Y-94), Germany, c. 15 April 1945
- AAF Station Nordholz (R-56), Germany, 5 June 1945 – 20 August 1946
- RAF Manston, England, 10 July 1952
- Ramstein-Landstuhl Air Base (later Ramstein Air Base), Germany, 15 May 1958 – 8 January 1961

=== Aircraft ===
- Douglas A-20 Havoc, 1943
- Douglas A-24 Banshee, 1943
- Curtiss A-25 Shrike, 1943
- Douglas A-26 Invader, 1943
- Vultee A-35 Vengeance, 1943
- North American A-36 Apache, 1943
- Cessna UC-78 Bobcat, 1943
- North American BC-1, 1943
- Bell P-39 Airacobra, 1943
- Curtiss P-40 Warhawk, 1943
- Republic P-47 Thunderbolt, 1943–1946
- Republic F-84 Thunderjet, 1952–1953
- North American F-86D Sabre, 1953–1961

=== Awards and campaigns ===
Award streamer	Award	Dates	Notes
	Distinguished Unit Citation	7 September 1944	France, 514th Fighter Squadron
	Distinguished Unit Citation	23 December 1944-27 December 1944	Belgium, 514th Fighter Squadron
	Air Force Outstanding Unit Award	31 October 1955-31 October 1958	514th Fighter-Interceptor Squadron

Campaign Streamer	Campaign	Dates	Notes
	American Theater without inscription	1 March 1943 – 13 March 1944	630th Bombardment Squadron (later 514th Fighter-bomber Squadron)
	Air Offensive, Europe	6 April 1944 – 5 June 1944	514th Fighter-Bomber Squadron (later 514th Fighter Squadron)
	Air Combat, EAME Theater	6 April 1944 – 11 May 1945	514th Fighter-Bomber Squadron (later 514th Fighter Squadron)
	Normandy	6 June 1944 – 24 July 1944	514th Fighter Squadron
	Northern France	25 July 1944 – 14 September 1944	514th Fighter Squadron
	Rhineland	15 September 1944 – 21 March 1945	514th Fighter Squadron
	Ardennes-Alsace	16 December 1944 – 25 January 1945	514th Fighter Squadron
	Central Europe	22 March 1944 – 21 May 1945	514th Fighter Squadron
	World War II Army of Occupation (Germany)	9 May 1945 – 20 August 1946	514th Fighter Squadron

== See also ==
- List of Douglas A-26 Invader operators
- List of F-86 Sabre units
