= 512th Fighter Squadron =

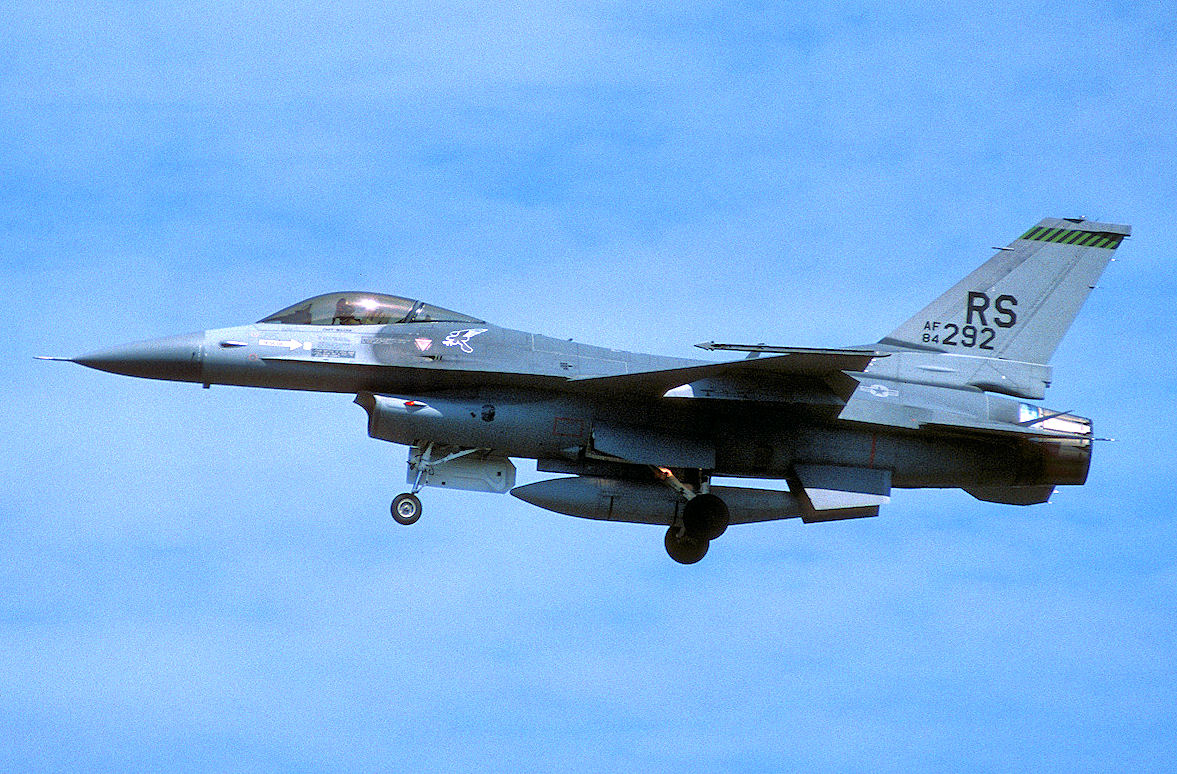
- 512th F-16C Fighting Falcon (Note: Aircraft is General Dynamics F-16C Block 25E Fighting Falcon, serial 84-1292. This plane was sent to the Aerospace Maintenance and Regeneration Center on 24 September 2008 and converted to a QF-16C drone on 13 November 2019. Baugher, Joe (14 April 2023). "1984 USAF Serial Numbers". Joe Baugher.)
- Active: 1943–1946; 1952–1959; 1976–1994
- Country: United States
- Branch: United States Air Force
- Role: Fighter
- Nickname: Dragons
- Motto: Vigilare pro Pace (Latin for 'On Guard for Peace') (after 1955)
- Engagements: European Theater of Operations
- Decorations: Distinguished Unit Citation; Air Force Outstanding Unit Award

Insignia
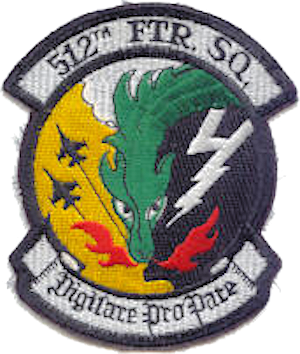
- Patch with 512th Fighter Squadron emblem (Note: Approved 9 September 1955. Description: A disc divided equally by a vertical arched line Air Force yellow and black, from a cloud formation proper, over the upper section of the disc, a green dragon, his head and neck moving over the arched division, with his head toward the base, breathing red flames of fire, his eyeballs white, his eyes black, with red pupils, all between two back silhouetted jet aircraft flying across the yellow area; and a white lightning bolt charging the black area)

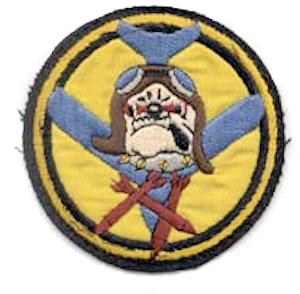
- Patch with 512th Squadron emblem (1952–1955)

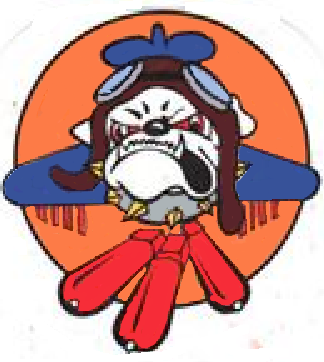
- 512th Fighter Squadron emblem (World War II)
- World War II fuselage code: L3

The 512th Fighter Squadron is an inactive United States Air Force unit. Its last assignment was with the 86th Fighter Wing at Ramstein Air Base, Germany, where it was inactivated September 1994.

The squadron was first activated as the 628th Bombardment Squadron in 1943. While retaining its mission as a ground attack unit, it became the 512th Fighter-Bomber Squadron a few months after activating. After training in the United States, it moved to the European Theater of Operations in the spring of 1944. It entered combat soon thereafter, and following D-Day, moved to the continent of Europe, where it gave close air support to American ground forces advancing across Europe. It earned two Distinguished Unit Citations for its actions during the war. Following V-E Day, the squadron served in the Army of Occupation until 1946, when it was inactivated and its personnel and equipment transferred to another unit.

The squadron was reactivated in 1952, when it replaced an Air National Guard unit that had been mobilized for the Korean War. The following year it assumed an air defense mission and continued with that mission until inactivated in 1959.

The squadron was reactivated as the 512th Tactical Fighter Squadron in 1976 and served in that role until 1994, when it transferred its fighters to Aviano Air Base, as its parent wing became an airlift unit.

== History ==
=== World War II ===
The squadron was first activated as the 628th Bombardment Squadron at Key Field, Mississippi on 1 March 1943. It was one of the four original squadrons of the 406th Bombardment Group and was initially equipped with a variety of attack, pursuit, and trainer aircraft. Although its mission did not substantially change, the squadron became the 512th Fighter-Bomber Squadron in August. It moved to Congaree Army Air Field, South Carolina and equipping with Republic P-47 Thunderbolts before the end of the year. The 512th trained with its "Jugs" until March 1944, when it departed the United States for the European Theater of Operations.

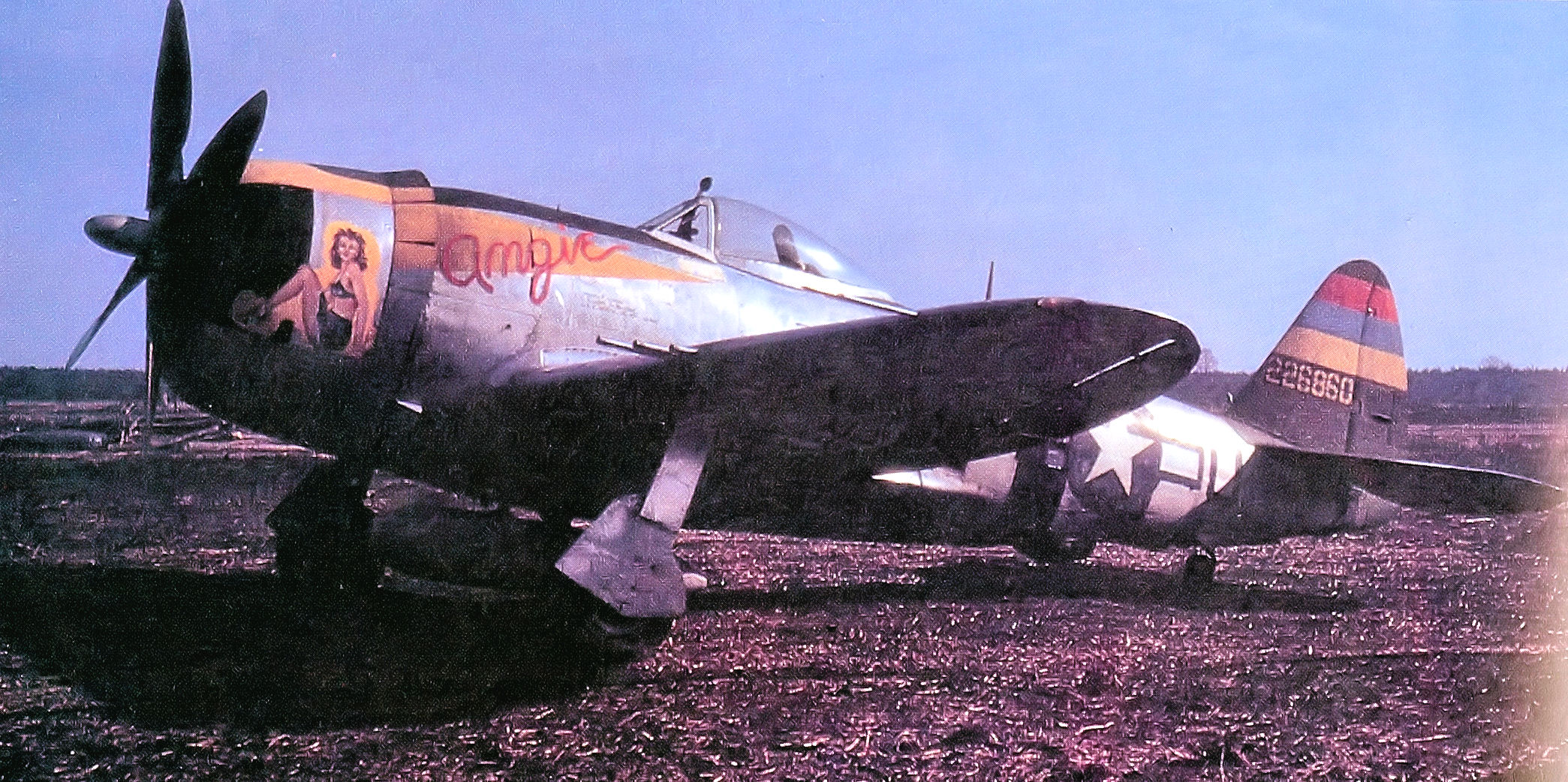
512th Fighter Squadron P-47D Thunderbolt (Note: Aircraft is Republic P-47D-27-RE Thunderbolt, serial 42-26860, Angie, fuselage code L3-O, at Asch (Asche) Airfield, Belgium in February 1945.)

The squadron arrived at RAF Ashford in England in early April and flew its first combat mission the following month, preparing for Operation Overlord, the Allied invasion of Normandy. It attacked military airfields, bridges and marshalling yards in France. On D-Day, the squadron flew patrols in the vicinity of the invasion beaches and armed reconnaissance and dive bombing missions.

The squadron supported Operation Cobra, the Allied breakthrough at Saint-Lo on 25 July, then moved to Tour-en-Bessin Airfield in France a few days later. The 512th participated in the reduction of Saint-Malo and Brest, France and supported the drive across France. On 7 September, flying from Saint-Léonard Airfield, the squadron operated with the other units of the 406th Fighter Group in destroying a column of tanks, armored vehicles and motor transport that were trying to escape to southeastern France through the Belfort Gap. This attack earned the squadron the Distinguished Unit Citation (DUC). The squadron cooperated with ground forces and flew air interdiction sorties in the area of the Mosel and Saar Rivers.

When the Germans launched the counterattack that resulted in the Battle of the Bulge in December 1944, the squadron shifted operations to the Ardennes to relive the embattled garrison at Bastogne. For four days in late December, the squadron flew attacks on German vehicles, gun emplacements and defensive positions close to Bastogne, for which it was awarded a second DUC. The squadron flew escort, interdiction, and air support missions in the Ruhr Valley early in 1945 and to assist Allied ground forces in the drive to and across the Rhine.

Following, V-E Day, the squadron moved to AAF Station Nordholz, Germany, where it became part of the Army of Occupation. The squadron was inactivated on 20 August 1946, and its personnel and equipment were transferred to the 525th Fighter Squadron. which was activated the same day.

=== Air defense in Europe ===
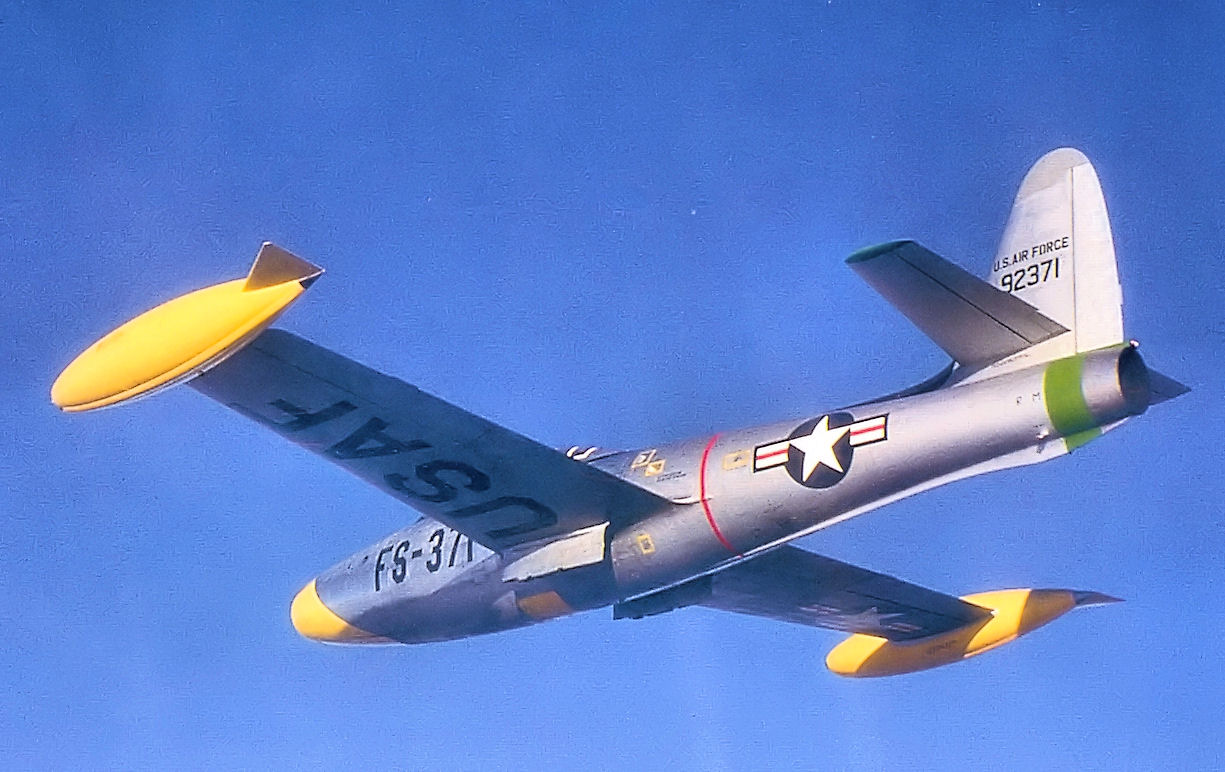
512th Squadron F-84E Thunderjet 49-2371 (Note: Aircraft is Republic F-84E-15-RE Thunderjet, serial 49-2371. It went to the Military Aircraft Storage and Disposition Center on 8 September 1955, but returned to service in the reserve on 31 May 1956, sold on 12 November 1958 and registered as a civilian aircraft. Baugher, Joe (2 May 2023). "1949 USAF Serial Numbers". Joe Baugher.)

The squadron returned to its Fighter-Bomber designation and was activated in July 1952 at RAF Manston, England, where it replaced the 156th Fighter-Bomber Squadron, a North Carolina Air National Guard unit that had been mobilized for the Korean War. The 512th assumed the mission, personnel and Republic F-84 Thunderjets of the 156th, which was returned to state control. In late 1953, the squadron converted to North American F-86 Sabres. For a brief time in 1954, the squadron was designated the 512th Fighter-Interceptor Squadron before becoming the 512th Fighter-Day Squadron in August. In November, the squadron moved to Soesterberg Air Base, Netherlands, where it carried out both fighter-bomber and air defense missions.

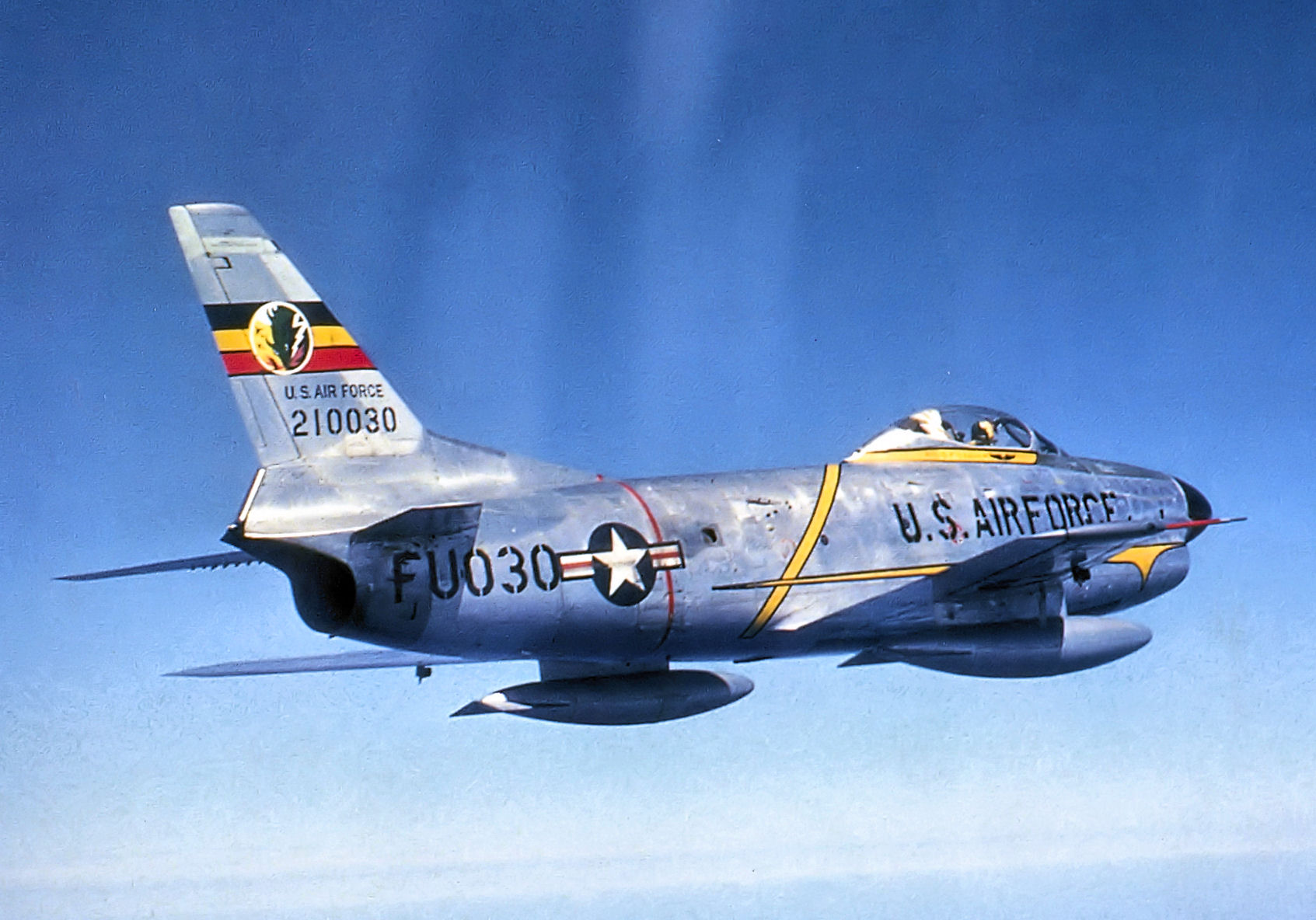
512th F-86D Sabre (Note: Aircraft is North American F-86D Sabre, serial 52-10030. Struck off charge on 19 March 1958. Baugher, Joe (2 May 2023). "1952 USAF Serial Numbers". Joe Baugher.)

On 8 September 1955, United States Air Forces in Europe moved the squadron back to England without personnel or equipment. The 32d Fighter-Day Squadron was activated at Soesterberg, absorbing the 512th's personnel and equipment, while the 512th assumed the resources of the inactivating 87th Fighter-Interceptor Squadron at RAF Bentwaters and resumed its designation as a fighter interceptor unit and mission of augmenting the air defenses of the United Kingdom.

When the 406th Fighter-Interceptor Wing reorganized in May 1956, the 406th Fighter-Interceptor Group was inactivated and the squadron assigned directly to wing headquarters. (Note: Under this plan, called the "dual deputy organization" flying squadrons reported to the wing Deputy Commander for Operations and maintenance squadrons reported to the wing Deputy Commander for Maintenance.) The squadron was awarded the Hughes Trophy as the best interceptor unit in the Air Force for the calendar year 1957. In February 1958, the 406th Wing began phasing down its operations as it prepared for inactivation. In connection with this drawdown, the squadron moved to Sembach Air Base, Germany on 24 March 1958 and was reassigned to the 86th Fighter-Interceptor Wing. However, while Sembach's runways could accommodate the squadron's Sabres, they were too short to safely operate more modern interceptors and the squadron was inactivated on 1 July 1959.

=== Tactical fighter operations in Germany ===
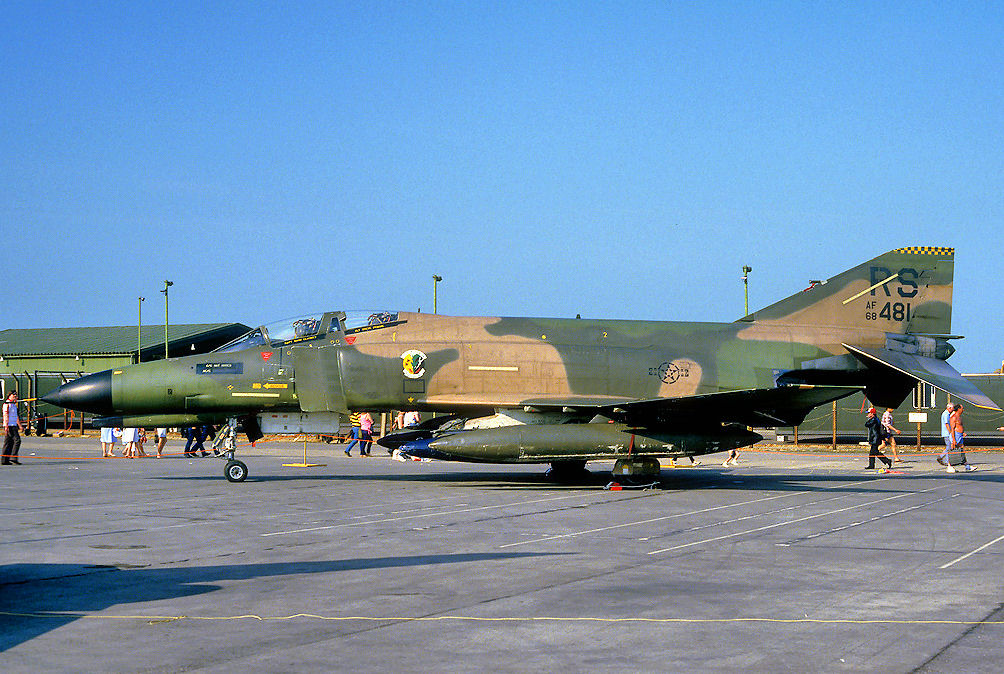
512th F-4E Phantom II (Note: Aircraft is McDonnell F-4E-40-MC Phantom II, serial 68-0481, tail code RS. Transferred to the Indiana Air National Guard in 1987 and to the Hellenic Air Force in November 1991. It is on display at Larissa Air Base, Greece. Baugher, Joe (14 April 2023). "1968 USAF Serial Numbers". Joe Baugher. This picture was taken in 1979.)

The squadron was reactivated at Ramstein Air Base as the 512th Tactical Fighter Squadron on 15 November 1976. The squadron was equipped with McDonnell F-4E Phantom IIs that became available when the 36th Tactical Fighter Wing at Bitburg Air Base, Germany received McDonnell Douglas F-15A Eagles. The squadron upgraded to General Dynamics F-16 Fighting Falcons in 1985. It supported numerous military units located in the area and participated in numerous exercises that provided the wing with air combat tactics training essential to their mission.

In 1994 the decision was made to change the 86th Wing to the airlift mission previously held by the 435th Airlift Wing at Rhein-Main Air Base, Germany, which was slated for transfer to the German government to be merged into Frankfurt Airport. The 512th was inactivated on 1 October 1994, and most of its aircraft and personnel moved to Aviano Air Base, Italy, where they were used to form the 510th Fighter Squadron.

== Lineage ==
- Constituted as the 628th Bombardment Squadron (Dive) on 4 February 1943

Activated on 1 March 1943
Redesignated 512th Fighter-Bomber Squadron on 10 August 1943
Redesignated 512th Fighter Squadron on 30 May 1944
Inactivated on 20 August 1946

- Redesignated 512th Fighter-Bomber Squadron on 25 June 1952

Activated on 10 July 1952
Redesignated 512th Fighter-Interceptor Squadron on 1 April 1954
Redesignated 512th Fighter-Day Squadron on 8 August 1954
Redesignated 512th Fighter-Interceptor Squadron on 8 September 1955
Inactivated on 1 July 1959

- Redesignated 512th Tactical Fighter Squadron

Activated on 15 November 1976
Redesignated 512th Fighter Squadron on 1 May 1991
Inactivated on 1 October 1994

=== Assignments ===
- 406th Bombardment Group (later 406th Fighter-Bomber Group, 406th Fighter Group), 1 March 1943 – 20 August 1946
- 406th Fighter-Bomber Group (later 406th Fighter-Interceptor Group), 10 July 1952
- 406th Fighter-Interceptor Wing, 1 May 1956
- 86th Fighter-Interceptor Wing, 24 March 1958 – 1 July 1959
- 86th Tactical Fighter Group, 15 November 1976
- 86th Tactical Fighter Wing, 15 June 1985
- 86th Operations Group, 1 May 1991 – 1 October 1994

=== Stations ===
- Key Field, Mississippi, 1 March 1943
- Congaree Army Air Field, South Carolina, 18 September 1943 – 13 March 1944
- RAF Ashford (AAF-417), England, 6 April 1944
- Tour-en-Bessin Airfield (A-13), France, c. 27 July 1944
- Cretteville Airfield (A-14), France, 17 August 1944
- Saint-Léonard Airfield (A-36), France, c. 4 September 1944
- Mourmelon-le-Grand Airfield (A-80), France, 24 September 1944
- Metz Airfield (Y-34), France, 31 January 1945
- Asch Airfield (Y-29), Belgium, 8 February 1945
- Münster-Handorf Airfield (Y-94), Germany, 15 April 1945
- AAF Station Nordholz (R-56), Germany, c. 5 June 1945 – 20 August 1946
- RAF Manston, England, 10 July 1952
- Soesterberg Air Base, Netherlands, 1 November 1954
- RAF Bentwaters, England, 8 September 1955 – 24 March 1958
- Sembach Air Base, Germany, 24 March 1958 – 1 July 1959
- Ramstein Air Base, Germany, 15 November 1976 – 1 October 1994

=== Aircraft ===
- Douglas A-20 Havoc, 1943
- Douglas A-24 Banshee, 1943
- Curtiss A-25 Shrike, 1943
- Douglas A-26 Invader, 1943
- Vultee A-35 Vengeance, 1943
- North American A-36 Apache, 1943
- Cessna UC-78 Bobcat, 1943
- North American BC-1, 1943
- Bell P-39 Airacobra, 1943
- Curtiss P-40 Warhawk, 1943
- Republic P-47 Thunderbolt, 1943–1946
- Republic F-84 Thunderjet, 1952–1953
- North American F-86 Sabre, 1953–1959
- McDonnell F-4E Phantom II, 1976–1985
- General Dynamics F-16 Fighting Falcon, 1985–1994

=== Awards and campaigns ===
Award streamer	Award	Dates	Notes
	Distinguished Unit Citation	7 September 1944	France, 512th Fighter Squadron
	Distinguished Unit Citation	23 December 1944-27 December 1944	Belgium, 512th Fighter Squadron
	Air Force Outstanding Unit Award	31 October 1954-31 October 1958	512th Fighter-Interceptor Squadron
	Air Force Outstanding Unit Award	July 1956 – February 1958	512th Fighter-Interceptor Squadron
	Air Force Outstanding Unit Award	1 July 1981-30 June 1982	512th Tactical Fighter Squadron
	Air Force Outstanding Unit Award	14 June 1985-13 June 1987	512th Tactical Fighter Squadron
	Air Force Outstanding Unit Award	1 May 1989-30 April 1991	512th Tactical Fighter Squadron
	Air Force Outstanding Unit Award	1 July 1992–30 June 1994	512th Fighter Squadron

1957 Hughes Trophy

Campaign Streamer	Campaign	Dates	Notes
	American Theater without inscription	1 March 1943 – 13 March 1944	628th Bombardment Squadron (later 512th Fighter-bomber Squadron)
	Air Offensive, Europe	6 April 1944 – 5 June 1944	512th Fighter-Bomber Squadron (later 512th Fighter Squadron)
	Air Combat, EAME Theater	6 April 1944 – 11 May 1945	512th Fighter-Bomber Squadron (later 512th Fighter Squadron)
	Normandy	6 June 1944 – 24 July 1944	512th Fighter Squadron
	Northern France	25 July 1944 – 14 September 1944	512th Fighter Squadron
	Rhineland	15 September 1944 – 21 March 1945	512th Fighter Squadron
	Ardennes-Alsace	16 December 1944 – 25 January 1945	512th Fighter Squadron
	Central Europe	22 March 1944 – 21 May 1945	512th Fighter Squadron
	World War II Army of Occupation (Germany)	9 May 1945 – 20 August 1946	512th Fighter Squadron

== See also ==
- List of Douglas A-26 Invader operators
- List of F-86 Sabre units
- McDonnell Douglas F-4 Phantom II non-U.S. operators
- General Dynamics F-16 Fighting Falcon operators
