= 513th Fighter-Interceptor Squadron =

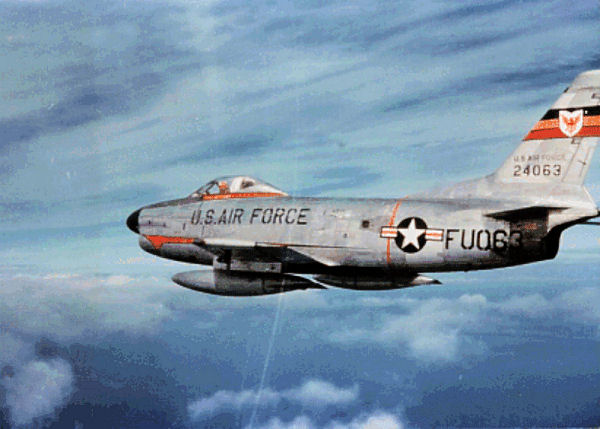
- 513th Fighter Interceptor Squadron F-86D Sabre (Note: Aircraft is North American F-86D-45-NA Sabre, serial 52-4063, flying from Phalsbourg AB in 1958. This plane was struck off charge on 4 August 1959 at Phalsbourg. Baugher, Joe (5 May 2023). "1952 USAF Serial Numbers". Joe Baugher.)
- Active: 1943–1946; 1952–1961
- Country: United States
- Branch: United States Air Force
- Role: Inerceptor
- Engagements: European Theater of Operations
- Decorations: Distinguished Unit Citation; Air Force Outstanding Unit Award

Insignia
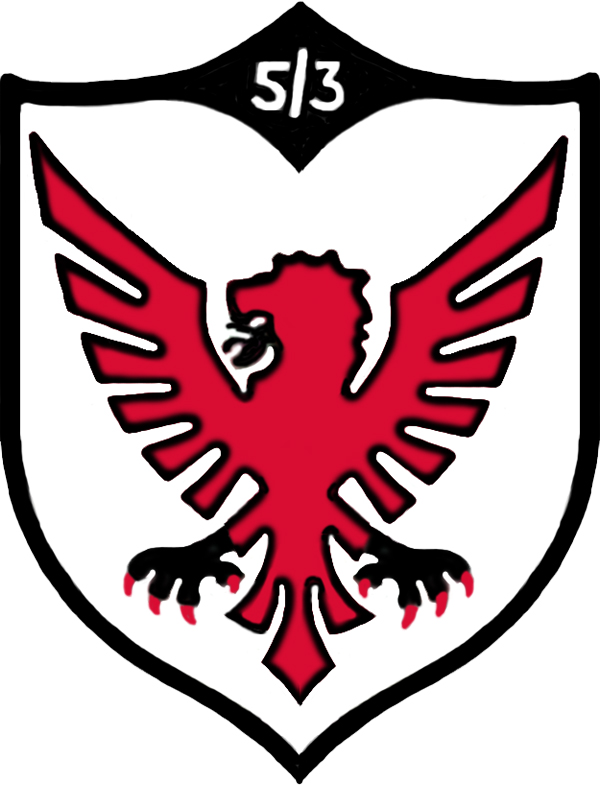
- 513th Fighter-Interceptor Squadron emblem (Note: Approved 28 April 1955. Description: On a shield white, with a border pattern black, a red chimerical creature with the head of a lion and the wings and the claws of a stylized eagle displayed, the feet black, the claws red, teeth and eye white, outlined black.)

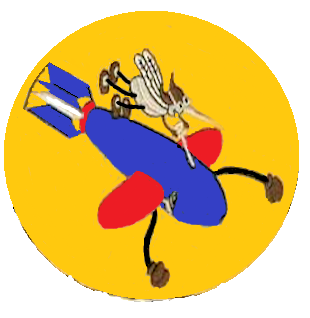
- 513th Fighter Squadron emblem (World War II)
- World War II fuselage code: 4P

The 513th Fighter-Interceptor Squadron is an inactive United States Air Force unit. Its last assignment was with the 86th Air Division, based at Phalsbourg-Bourscheid Air Base, France, where it was inactivated on 8 January 1961.

The squadron was first activated as the 629th Bombardment Squadron in 1943. While retaining its mission as a ground attack, unit, it became the 513th Fighter-Bomber Squadron a few months after activating. After training in the United States, it moved to the European Theater of Operations in the spring of 1944. It entered combat soon thereafter, and following D-Day, moved to the continent of Europe, where it gave close air support to American ground forces advancing across Europe. It earned two Distinguished Unit Citations for its actions during the war. Following V-E Day, the squadron served in the Army of Occupation until 1946, when it was inactivated and its personnel and equipment transferred to another unit.

The squadron was reactivated in 1952, when it replaced an Air National Guard unit that had been mobilized for the Korean War. The following year it assumed an air defense mission and continued with that mission until inactivated.

== History ==
=== World War II ===
The squadron was first activated as the 629th Bombardment Squadron at Key Field, Mississippi on 1 March 1943. It was one of the four original squadrons of the 406th Bombardment Group and was initially equipped with a variety of attack, pursuit, and trainer aircraft. Although its mission did not substantially change, the squadron became the 513th Fighter-Bomber Squadron in August. It moved to Congaree Army Air Field, South Carolina and equipped with Republic P-47 Thunderbolts before the end of the year. The 513th trained with its "Jugs" until March 1944, when it departed the United States for the European Theater of Operations.

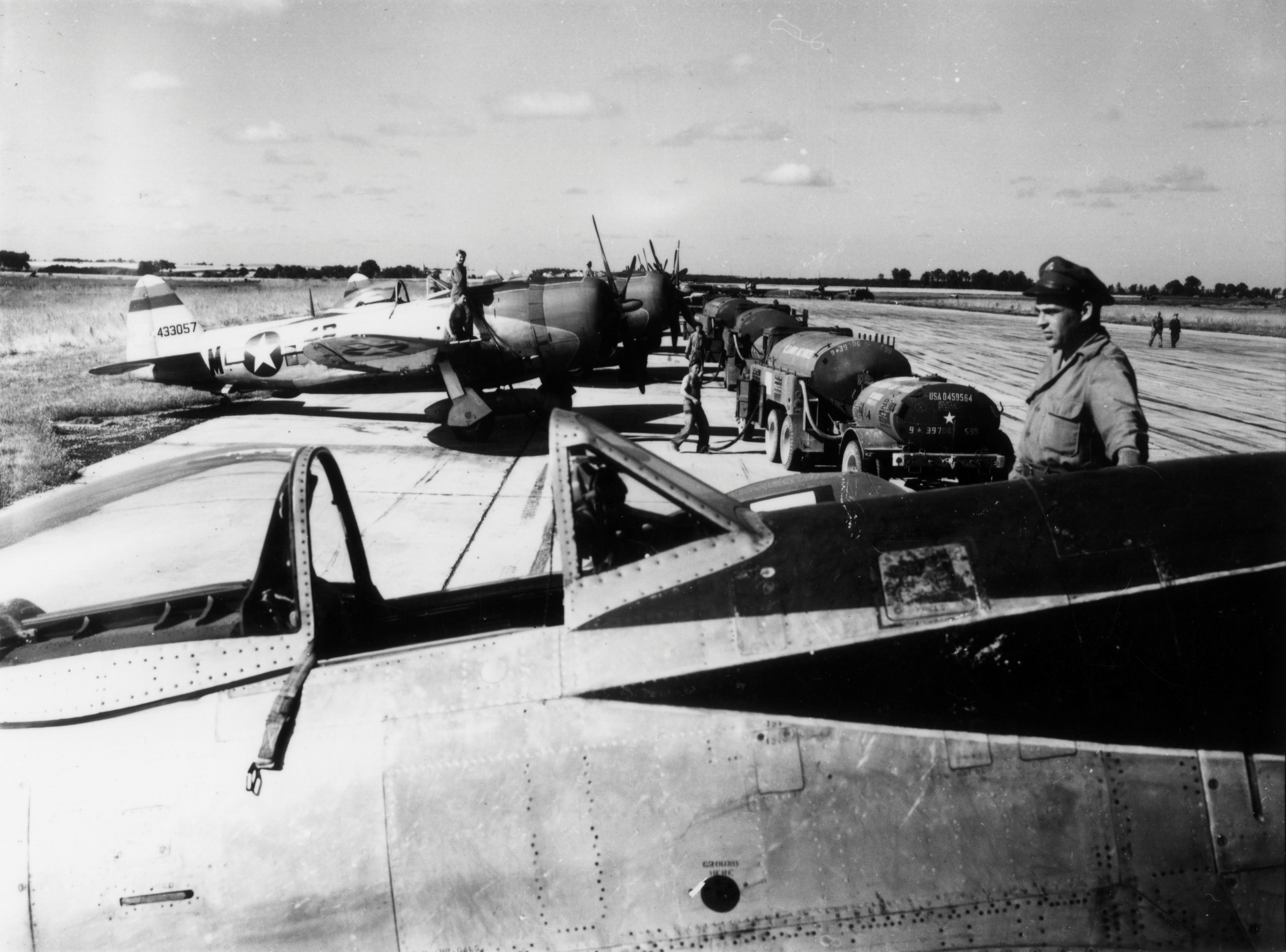
513th Squadron P-47D refueling (Note: The first airplane in the background is Republic P-47D-30-RA Thunderbolt, serial 44-33057, fuselage code 4P-M. This plane crash landed on 12 September 1946 near Nordholz, Germany.)

The squadron arrived at RAF Ashford in England in early April and flew its first combat mission the following month, preparing for Operation Overlord, the Allied invasion of Normandy. It attacked military airfields, bridges and marshalling yards in France. On D-Day, the squadron flew patrols in the vicinity of the invasion beaches and armed reconnaissance and dive bombing missions.

The squadron supported Operation Cobra, the Allied breakthrough at Saint-Lo on 25 July, then moved to Tour-en-Bessin Airfield in France a few days later. The 513th participated in the reduction of Saint-Malo and Brest, France and supported the drive across France. On 7 September, flying from Saint-Léonard Airfield, the squadron operated with the other units of the 406th Fighter Group in destroying a column of tanks, armored vehicles and motor transport that were trying to escape to southeastern France through the Belfort Gap. This attack earned the squadron the Distinguished Unit Citation (DUC). The squadron cooperated with ground forces and flew air interdiction sorties in the area of the Mosel and Saar Rivers.

When the Germans launched the counterattack that resulted in the Battle of the Bulge in December 1944, the squadron shifted operations to the Ardennes to relive the embattled garrison at Bastogne. For four days in late December, the squadron flew attacks on German vehicles, gun emplacements and defensive positions close to Bastogne, for which it was awarded a second DUC. The squadron flew escort, interdiction, and air support missions in the Ruhr Valley early in 1945 and to assist Allied ground forces in the drive to and across the Rhine.

Following, V-E Day, the squadron moved to AAF Station Nordholz, Germany, where it became part of the Army of Occupation. The squadron was inactivated on 20 August 1946, and its personnel and equipment were transferred to the 526th Fighter Squadron. which was activated the same day.

=== Air defense in Europe ===
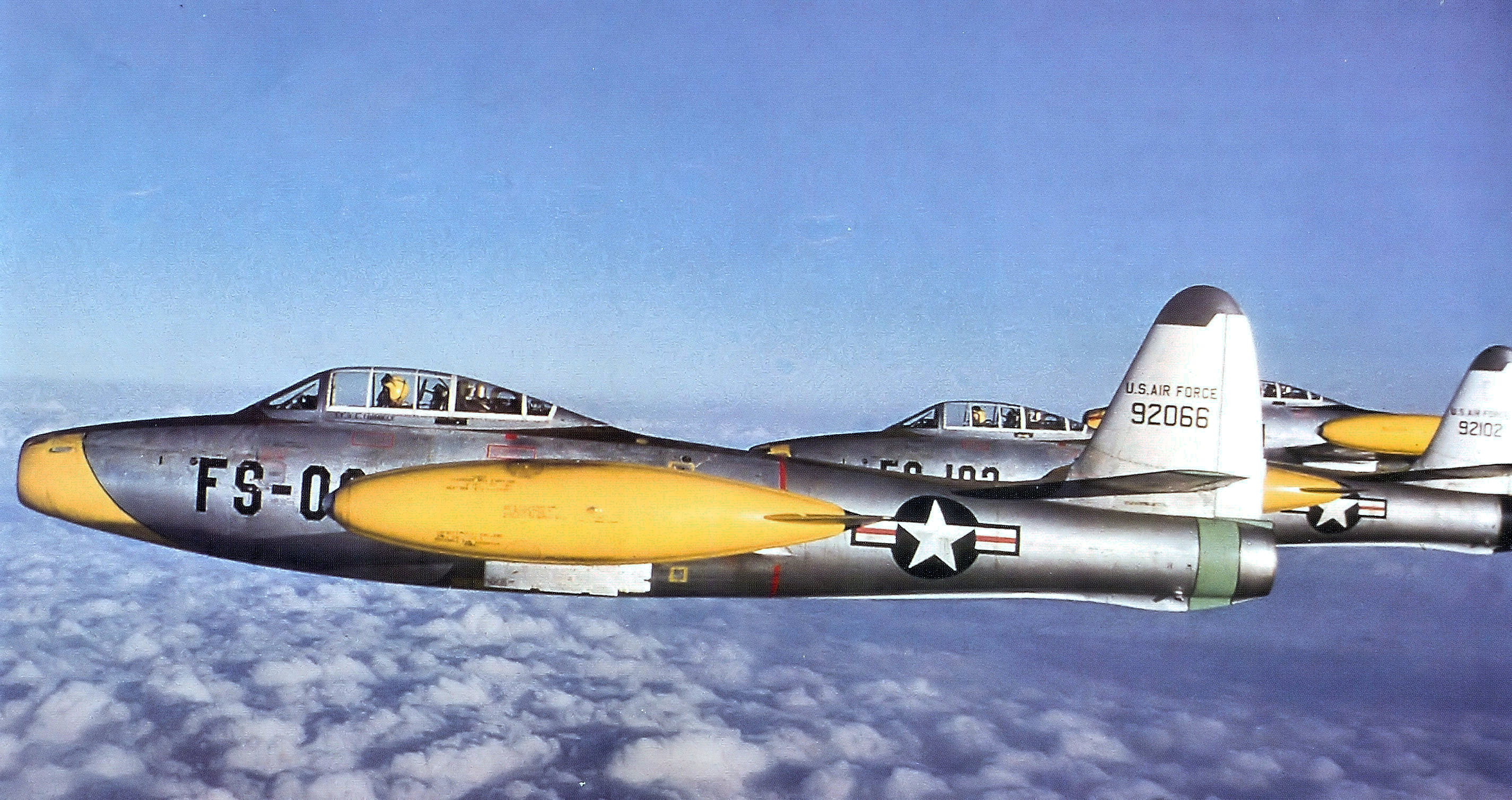
406th Wing F-84E Thunderjets (Note: Lead aircraft is Republic F-84E-1-RE Thunderjet, serial 49-2066. The Thunderjets were flown to RAF Manston by the 12th Fighter-Escort Wing, then taken over successively by the 123d and 406th Fighter-Bomber Wings. in 1954, this plane was transferred to the Ohio Air National Guard. It was transferred to the Military Aircraft Storage and Disposal Center on 4 September 1957 and scrapped on 24 October 1957. Baugher, Joe (2 May 2023). "1949 USAF Serial Numbers". Joe Baugher.)

The squadron returned to its Fighter-Bomber designation and was activated in July 1952 at RAF Manston, England, where it replaced the 165th Fighter-Bomber Squadron, a Kentucky Air National Guard unit that had been mobilized for the Korean War. The 513th assumed the mission, personnel and Republic F-84 Thunderjets of the 165th, which was returned to state control. In late 1953, the squadron converted to North American F-86 Sabres. In 1954, the squadron was designated the 513th Fighter-Interceptor Squadron.

When the 406th Fighter-Interceptor Wing reorganized in May 1956, the 406th Fighter-Interceptor Group was inactivated and the squadron assigned directly to wing headquarters. (Note: Under this plan, called the "dual deputy organization" flying squadrons reported to the wing Deputy Commander for Operations and maintenance squadrons reported to the wing Deputy Commander for Maintenance.) In February 1958, the 406th Wing began phasing down its operations as it prepared for inactivation. In connection with this drawdown, the squadron moved to Phalsbourg-Bourscheid Air Base on 17 April 1958 and was reassigned to the 86th Fighter-Interceptor Wing a week later. At Phalsbourg, the squadron maintained two F-86D Sabres on alert at the end of the runway. However, the 86th was converting to the Convair F-102 Delta Dagger. As the squadron prepared for inactivation, it flew its Sabres to the Chateauroux Air Depot, where they were scrapped and their components used as spares for NATO units operating the F-86, and most of the squadron's pilots transferred to F-102 units. The squadron was inactivated on 8 January 1961, one of the last two F-86 squadrons in United States Air Forces in Europe.

== Lineage ==
- Constituted as the 629th Bombardment Squadron (Dive) on 4 February 1943

Activated on 1 March 1943
Redesignated 513th Fighter-Bomber Squadron on 10 August 1943
Redesignated 513th Fighter Squadron on 30 May 1944
Inactivated on 20 August 1946

- Redesignated 513th Fighter-Bomber Squadron on 25 June 1952

Activated on 10 July 1952.
Redesignated 513th Fighter-Interceptor Squadron on 1 April 1954
Discontinued and inactivated on 8 January 1961

=== Assignments ===
- 406th Bombardment Group (later 406th Fighter-Bomber Group, 406th Fighter Group), 1 March 1943 – 20 August 1946
- 406th Fighter-Bomber Group (later 406th Fighter-Interceptor Group), 10 July 1952
- 406th Fighter-Interceptor Wing, 1 May 1955
- 86th Fighter-Interceptor Wing (later 86th Air Division), 25 April 1958 – 8 January 1961

=== Stations ===
- Key Field, Mississippi, 1 March 1943
- Congaree Army Air Field, South Carolina, 18 September 1943 – 13 March 1944
- RAF Ashford (AAF-417), England, 5 April 1944
- Tour-en-Bessin Airfield (A-13), France, c. 19 July 1944
- Cretteville Airfield (A-14), France, 17 August 1944
- Saint-Léonard Airfield (A-36), France, 4 September 1944
- Mourmelon-le-Grand Airfield (A-80), France, 22 September 1944
- Metz Airfield (Y-34), France, c. 2 February 1945
- Asch Airfield (Y-29), Belgium, c. 6 February 1945
- Münster-Handorf Airfield (Y-94), Germany, c. 15 April 1945
- AAF Station Nordholz (R-56), Germany, 5 June 1945 – 20 August 1946
- RAF Manston, England, 10 July 1952
- Phalsbourg-Bourscheid Air Base, France, 16 April 1958 – 8 January 1961

=== Aircraft ===
- Douglas A-20 Havoc, 1943
- Douglas A-24 Banshee, 1943
- Curtiss A-25 Shrike, 1943
- Douglas A-26 Invader, 1943
- Vultee A-35 Vengeance, 1943
- North American A-36 Apache, 1943
- Cessna UC-78 Bobcat, 1943
- North American BC-1, 1943
- Bell P-39 Airacobra, 1943
- Curtiss P-40 Warhawk, 1943
- Republic P-47 Thunderbolt, 1943–1946
- Republic F-84 Thunderjet, 1952–1953
- North American F-86 Sabre, 1953–1961

=== Awards and campaigns ===
Award streamer	Award	Dates	Notes
	Distinguished Unit Citation	7 September 1944	France, 513th Fighter Squadron
	Distinguished Unit Citation	23 December 1944-27 December 1944	Belgium, 513th Fighter Squadron
	Air Force Outstanding Unit Award	31 October 1954-31 October 1958	513th Fighter-Interceptor Squadron

Campaign Streamer	Campaign	Dates	Notes
	American Theater without inscription	1 March 1943 – 13 March 1944	629th Bombardment Squadron (later 513th Fighter-bomber Squadron)
	Air Offensive, Europe	6 April 1944 – 5 June 1944	513th Fighter-Bomber Squadron (later 513th Fighter Squadron)
	Air Combat, EAME Theater	6 April 1944 – 11 May 1945	513th Fighter-Bomber Squadron (later 513th Fighter Squadron)
	Normandy	6 June 1944 – 24 July 1944	513th Fighter Squadron
	Northern France	25 July 1944 – 14 September 1944	513th Fighter Squadron
	Rhineland	15 September 1944 – 21 March 1945	513th Fighter Squadron
	Ardennes-Alsace	16 December 1944 – 25 January 1945	513th Fighter Squadron
	Central Europe	22 March 1944 – 21 May 1945	513th Fighter Squadron
	World War II Army of Occupation (Germany)	9 May 1945 – 20 August 1946	513th Fighter Squadron

== See also ==
- List of Douglas A-26 Invader operators
- List of F-86 Sabre units
