= 406th Air Expeditionary Group =

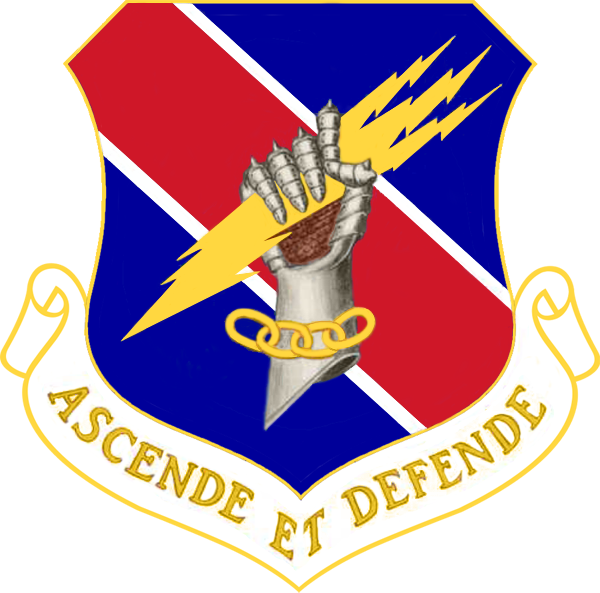
- Emblem of the 406th Air Expeditionary Group
- Active: 1943–1946; 1952–1956; 2001-TBD
- Country: United States
- Branch: United States Air Force
- Type: Air Expeditionary
- Motto(s): Ascende et Defende – "Rise and Defend"

The 406th Air Expeditionary Group (406 AEOG) is the operational flying component of the 406th Air Expeditionary Wing. It is a provisional unit assigned to the United States Air Forces in Europe.

The current status of this unit is undetermined.

The group's World War II predecessor unit, the 406th Fighter Group was assigned to Ninth Air Force in Western Europe. It was awarded two Distinguished Unit Citations for its actions in combat during the Battle of Normandy and the Battle of the Bulge.

== History ==
For additional history and lineage, see 406th Air Expeditionary Wing

=== World War II ===
Media related to 406th Fighter Group (United States Army Air Forces) at Wikimedia Commons

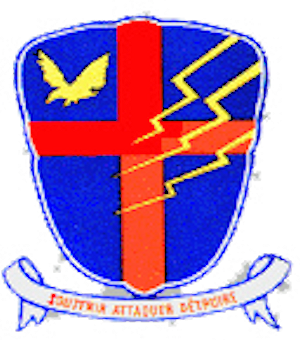
Emblem of the World War II 406th Fighter Group

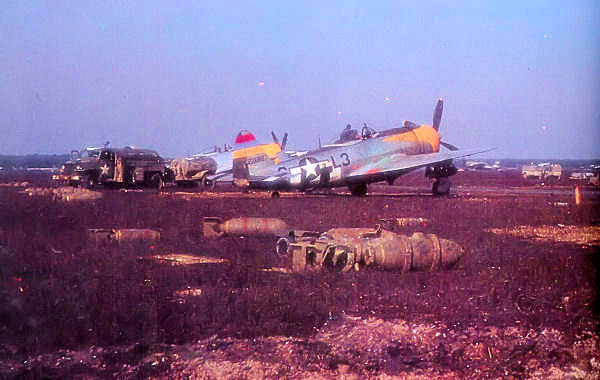
Republic P-47D Thunderbolts including P-47D-28-RA 42-28887 L3-G of the 512th Fighter Squadron, 406th Fighter Group at Y-29 in Asch, Belgium in April 1945

Established as a dive-bomber attack group at Key Field, Mississippi on 1 March 1943, Trained with numerous attack aircraft both at Key Field and at Congree Army Airfield, South Carolina until May 1944. Converted to a Fighter-Bomber group and deployed to European Theater in March 1944. Assigned to Ninth Air Force.

Entered combat with P-47 Thunderbolts in May when the Allies were preparing for the invasion of the Continent. Provided area cover during the landings in June, and afterward flew armed-reconnaissance and dive-bombing missions against the enemy, attacking such targets as motor transports, gun emplacements, ammunition dumps, rail lines, marshalling yards, and bridges during the campaign in Normandy. Helped prepare the way for the Allied breakthrough at St Lo on 25 July

Moved to the Continent early in August 1944 and continued to provide tactical air support for ground forces. Participated in the reduction of St Malo and Brest. Aided the Allied drive across France, receiving a Distinguished Unit Citation for operations on 7 September 1944 when the group destroyed a large column of armored vehicles and military transports that were attempting to escape from southeastern France through the Belfort Gap. Operated closely with ground forces and flew interdiction missions during the drive to the Moselle-Saar region.

Shifted operations from the Saar basin to the Ardennes and assisted the beleaguered garrison at Bastogne after the Germans had launched the counteroffensive that precipitated the Battle of the Bulge. Operated almost exclusively within a ten-mile radius of Bastogne from 23 to 27 December 1944, a period for which the group received a second DUC for its at¬tacks on tanks, vehicles, defended buildings, and gun positions. Flew escort, interdiction, and close-support missions in the Ruhr Valley early in 1945 and thus assisted Allied ground forces in their drive to and across the Rhine.

Remained in Europe after V-E Day, being assigned to United States Air Forces in Europe for duty in Bremen, Germany (AAF Station Nordholz) with the army of occupation. Inactivated on 20 August 1946, personnel and equipment being assigned to 86th Fighter Group keeping with Air Force policy of having low-numbered units active as much as possible.

=== From the 1950s ===
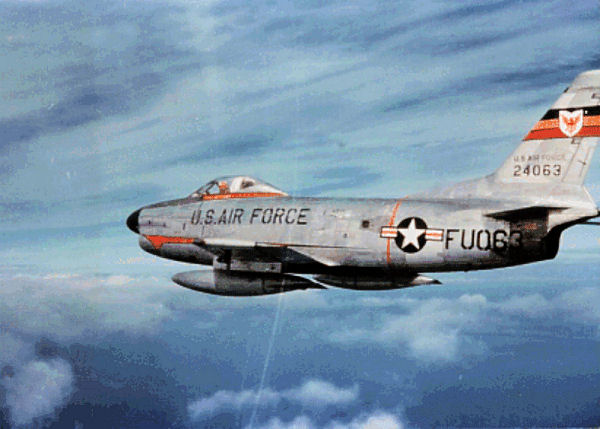
North American F-86D-45-NA Sabre Serial 52-4063 of the 513th Fighter Interceptor Squadron

The 406th was reactivated in England as the 406th Fighter-Bomber Group on 10 July 1952 and assigned to the United States Air Forces in Europe Third Air Force. It replaced the federalized 123d Fighter-Bomber Group which was returned to Kentucky Air National Guard control. The group was composed of the 512th, 513th and 514th Fighter Squadrons and equipped with F-84G Thunderjets.

From activation until August 1953, the 406th was tasked with both fighter-bomber and air defense roles in the United Kingdom. In the fall of 1953, the group was re-equipped with F-86F Sabres which were returned from action in Korea. In 1956, the unit was upgraded to the F-86D Sabre interceptor version and the group's mission was changed to assist RAF Fighter Command with air defense of the United Kingdom.

The group was inactivated on 1 May 1956 when 406th FIW converted to Tri-Deputate organization, assigning operational squadrons directly to the wing.

The group was reactivated as an Air Expeditionary unit in 2001. Was active in Turkey before Turkey refused to allow its territory to be used as part of the March 2003 invasion of Iraq. It seems likely the 406 AEG was inactivated shortly afterwards.

== Lineage ==
- Constituted as the 406th Bombardment Group (Dive) on 4 February 1943

Activated on 1 March 1943
Redesignated 406th Fighter-Bomber Group in August 1943
Redesignated 406th Fighter Group in May 1944
Inactivated on 20 August 1946

- Redesignated 406th Fighter-Bomber Group and activated on 10 July 1952

Redesignated 406th Fighter-Interceptor Group in April 1954
Inactivated on 1 May 1956
Redesignated 406th Tactical Fighter Training Group on 31 July 1985 (Remained inactive)

- Redesignated 406th Air Expeditionary Group and converted to provisional status on 5 February 2001.

=== Assignments ===
- III Fighter Command, 1 March 1943
- IX Fighter Command, 4 April 1944
- 303d Fighter Wing

Attached to XIX Tactical Air Command, 1 August 1944

- 100th Fighter Wing

Attached to XIX Tactical Air Command, 1 October 1944

- XXIX Tactical Air Command, 8 February 1945
- United States Air Forces in Europe

Attached to XII Tactical Air Command, 25 October 1945 – 20 August 1946

- 406th Fighter-Bomber (later Fighter-Interceptor) Wing, 10 July 1952 – 1 May 1956
- United States Air Forces in Europe to activate or inactivate at any time after 5 February 2001.

=== Components ===
- 512th (formerly 628th Bombardment) Fighter Squadron: 1 March 1943 – 20 August 1946; 10 July 1952 – 1 May 1956
- 513th (formerly 629th Bombardment) Fighter Squadron: 1 March 1943 – 20 August 1946; 10 July 1952 – 1 May 1956
- 514th (formerly 630th Bombardment) Fighter Squadron: 1 March 1943 – 20 August 1946; 10 July 1952 – 1 May 1956
- 631st Bombardment Squadron: 1 March – 15 August 1943

Trained for combat, disbanded and assets transferred to 512th, 513th and 514th Fighter Squadrons.

=== Stations ===
- Key Field, Mississippi, 1 March 1943
- Congree Army Airfield, South Carolina, c. 18 September 1943 – 13 March 1944
- RAF Ashford (AAF-417), England, 4 April 1944
- Tour-en-Bessin Airfield (A-13), France, 5 August 1944
- Cretteville Airfield (A-14), France, 17 August 1944
- Saint-Léonard Airfield (A-36), France, 4 September 1944
- Mourmelon-le-Grand Airfield (A-80), France, 22 September 1944
- Metz Airfield (Y-34), France, 2 February 1945
- Asch Airfield (Y-29), Belgium, 8 February 1945
- Münster-Handorf Airfield (Y-94), Germany, 15 April 1945
- AAF Station Nordholz, Germany, 5 June 1945 – 20 August 1946
- RAF Manston, England, to July 1952-1 May 1956
- Undisclosed Location(s), 5 February 2001–present

=== Aircraft ===
- Included A-20, A-24, A-25, A-26, A-35, A-36, UC-78, BC-1, P-39 and P-40, 1943
- P-47 Thunderbolt, 1943–1946
- F-84 Thunderjet, 1952–1953
- F-86D Sabre, 1953–1956
