= 86th Air Division =

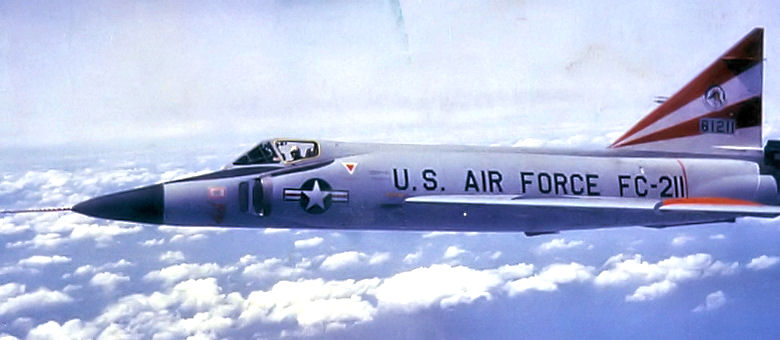
- 86th Air Division, 526th Fighter-Interceptor Squadron F-102A Delta Dagger - 56-1211 about 1965
- Active: 1960-1968
- Country: United States
- Branch: Air Force
- Type: Air Division
- Role: Air Defense
- Part of: United States Air Forces in Europe
- Garrison/HQ: Ramstein Air Base

Insignia
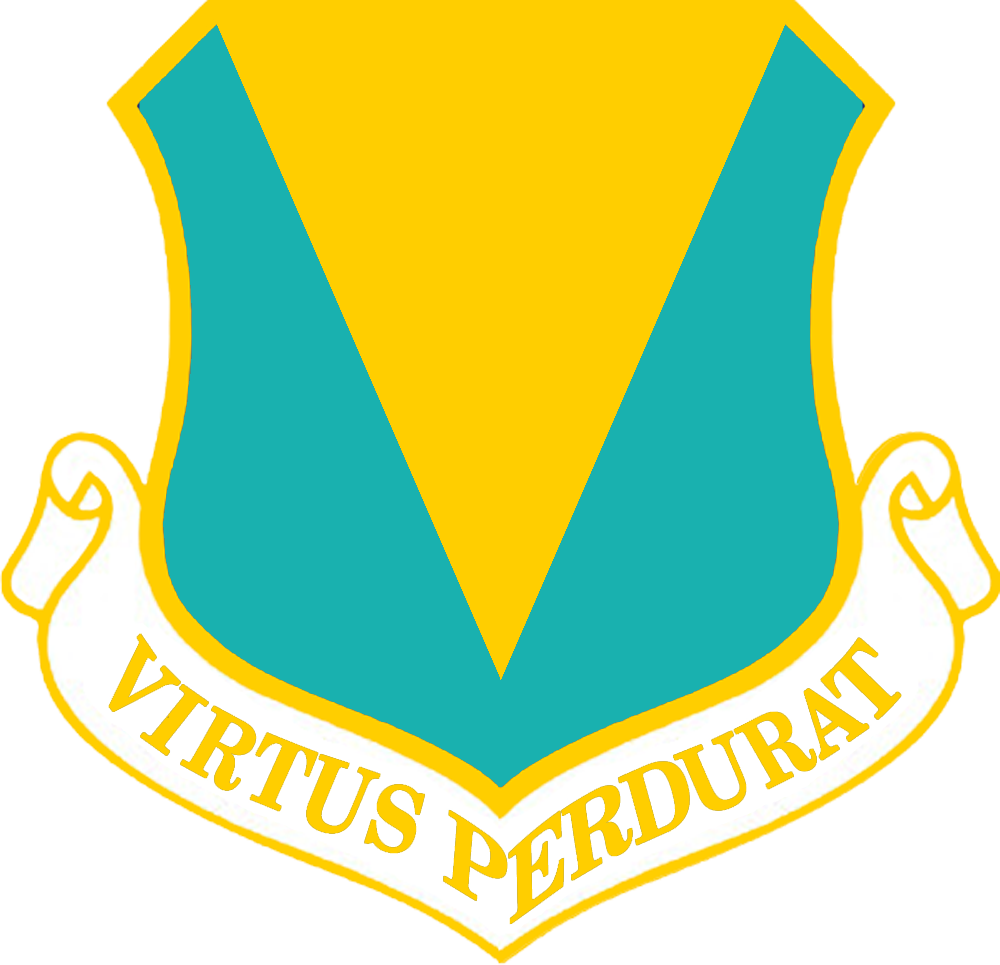
- 86th Air Division emblem

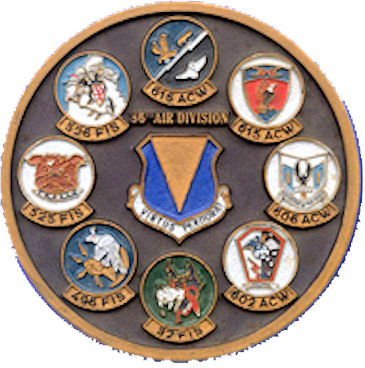
- 86th Air Division Gaggle emblem

Aircraft flown
- Interceptor: Convair F-102 Delta Dagger, Lockheed F-104 Starfighter, North American F-86D Sabre

The 86th Air Division (86 AD) is a former designation of the 86th Airlift Wing, a United States Air Force organization. It was assigned to United States Air Forces in Europe at Ramstein Air Base, West Germany. It was inactivated on 14 November 1968. Its mission was the air defense of NATO-controlled airspace in Western Europe.

== History ==
For additional history see 86th Airlift Wing

=== Formation ===
The 86th Air Division (Defense) was a re-designation of the 86th Fighter-Interceptor Wing at Ramstein Air Base, West Germany, on 18 November 1960 when the 86th FIW was combined with the ground radar functions of the 501st Tactical Control Wing. Its mission was to upgrade the air defense capabilities of Western Europe.

=== Chain of Command ===
Unlike other USAFE organizations, the 86th AD had a complex chain of command. Air defense missions were directed by the U.S. Air Force Chief of Staff from The Pentagon in Washington, D.C.. Since the components of the division would be committed to the North Atlantic Treaty Organization (NATO) in time of war, USAFE NATO missions came under the direction of the Supreme Allied Commander, Supreme Headquarters, Allied Powers Europe (SHAPE). Thus all 86 AD units came under a dual command structure.

Under NATO, the Allied Air Forces Central Europe (AAAFCE) was divided into the 2nd Allied Tactical Air Force (2ATAF) and the 4th ATAF, commanded by the Allied Forces Central Europe (AFCENT). Fighter-Interceptor units in Spain, however, were not part of AFCENT, and operated under a separate command structure of the 65th Air Division at Torrejon Air Base, Spain.

The 86th AD units in West Germany reported to NATO 4ATAF, and its interceptor units operated in Air Defense Sector 3 (Central and Southern West Germany). The 32d FIS in The Netherlands reported to NATO 2ATAF, and operated in Air Defense Sector 1 (Benelux, Northern West Germany). USAFE FIS units in Spain were not part of the NATO air defense system, but were charged with the protection of USAF units in Spain and operated as part of the Spanish Air Defense System.

=== Operations ===
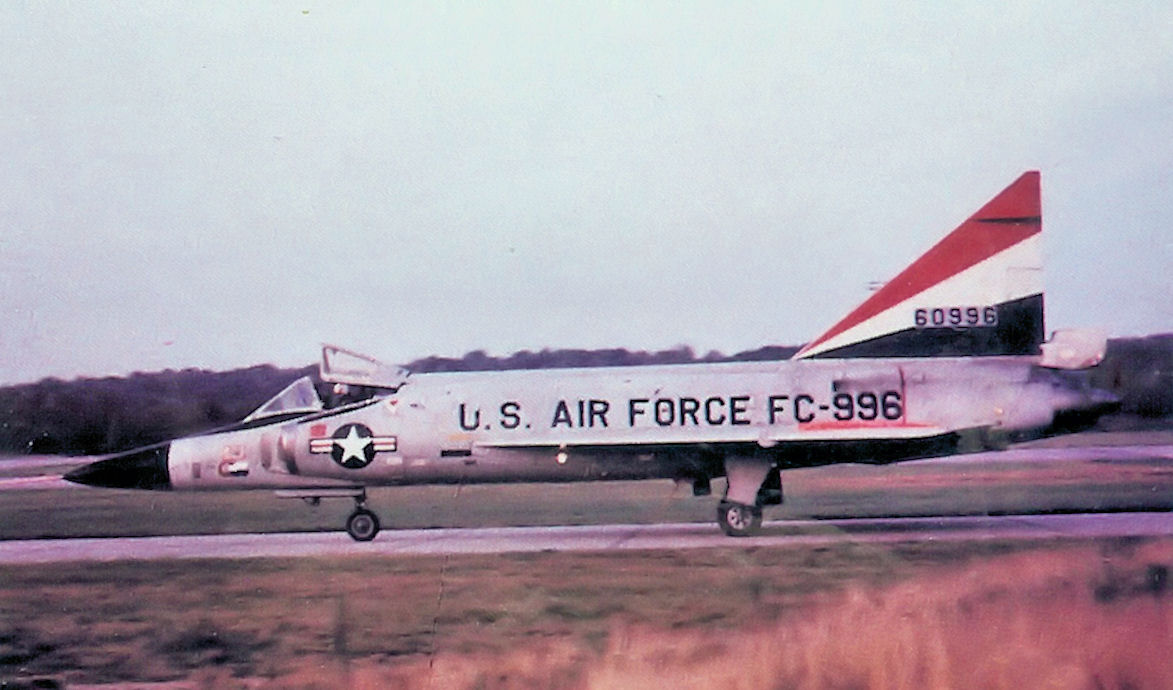
32d FIS F-102 Delta Dagger, 1962

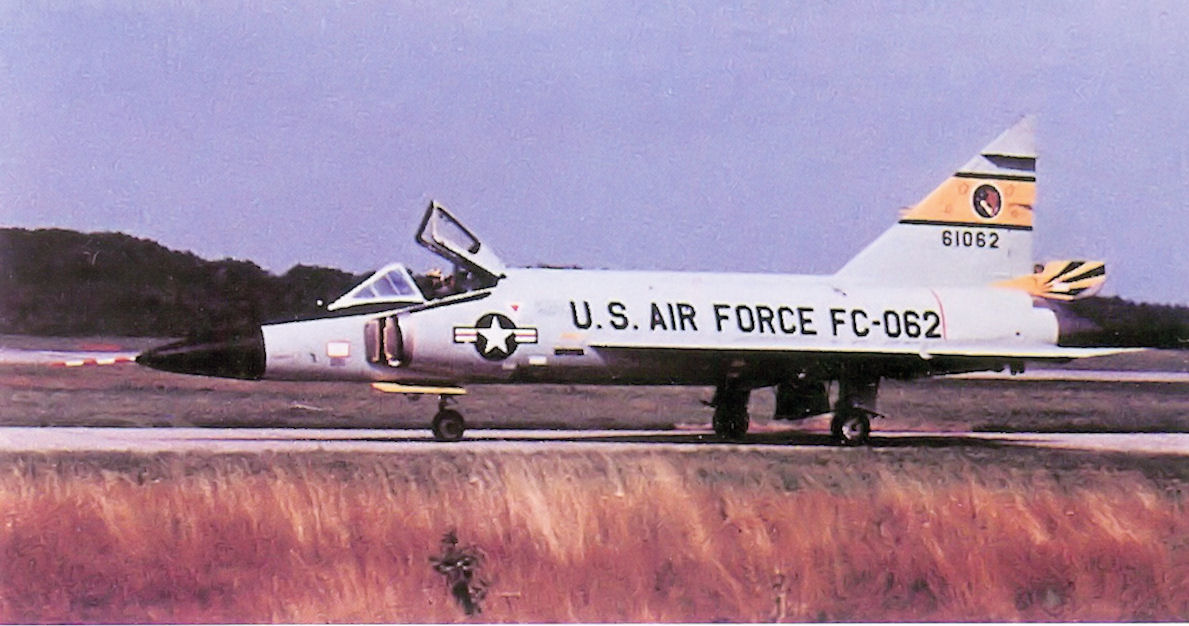
496th FIS F-102 about 1965

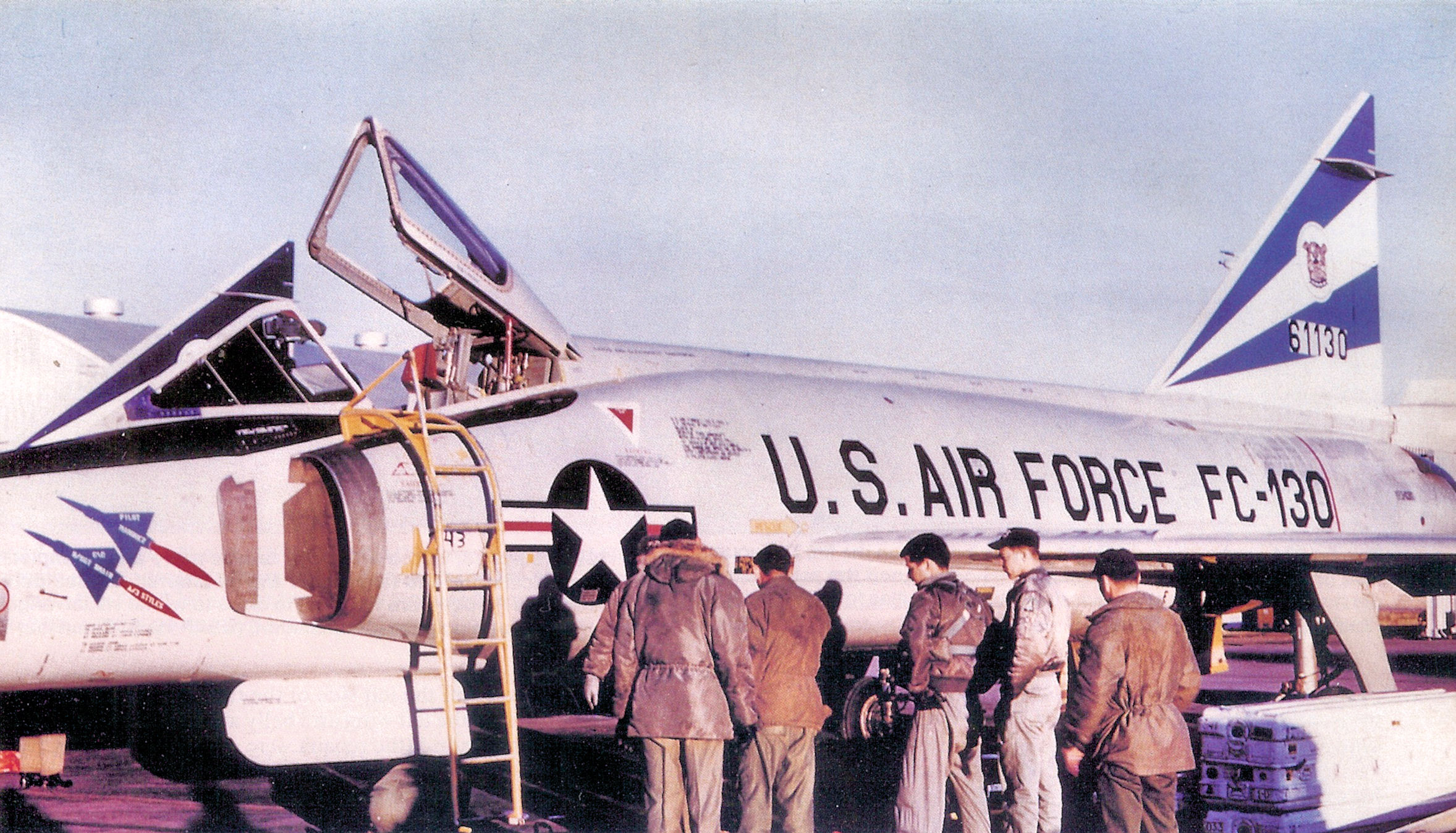
525th FIS F-102 about 1962

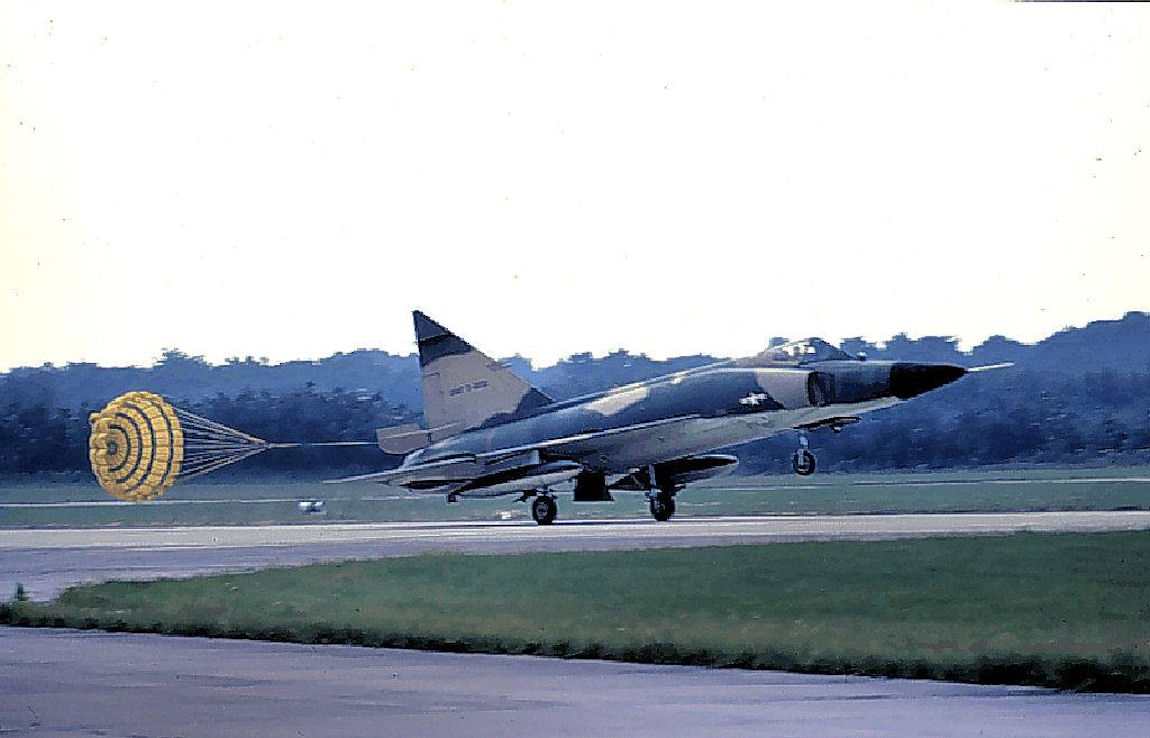
32d FIS F-102 landing with drouge parachute deployued, 1967

86th AD FIS were linked to a number of ground control radar stations through an extensive communications network. In Central Europe, NATO had divided the region into four Air Defense Sectors. Each of these sectors had their own operations enter which functioned as the central coordination center for units under its control.

The 86th AD always had one flight of interceptors in the air. A normal sortie lasted about 90 minutes. Along with the airborne aircraft, each squadron had two to four aircraft in an alert hangar, with one pair on five-minute and the other pair on fifteen minute alert (although in November 1963, this was changed to a thirty-minute alert). An additional two squadron aircraft were maintained on a one-hour standby. The main peacetime mission for the interceptors was the identification of unknown aircraft in the ADIZ (Air Defense Identification Zone). This was a thirty-mile wide zone between Communist-controlled areas and NATO airspace. Between two and four alert scrambles happened weekly to identify intruders. These were usually airliners or private aircraft off their track or flight plan. In addition, each squadron was tasked to provide assistance to pilots in distress.

Another, but no less important mission was the control of the Southern Air Corridor between West Germany and West Berlin. Radar controllers of the 616th Aircraft Control & Warning Squadron at Wasserkuppe guided both military and civilian aircraft though the negotiated air corridor over East Germany to and from Tempelhof Central Airport.

86th AD aircraft also would fly "ferret" missions along the East German border. Squadron aircraft would depart in two waves, about eight minutes apart, flying towards East German airspace at a high altitude and speed. Within a mile of the border they would sharply turn and head to the nearest NATO airfield. The purpose of these missions was to cause the Warsaw Pact Air Defense System to turn on their radars so that USAF ELINT aircraft could locate and evaluate these radars.

Beginning in 1963, the Air Defense Warning and Control System in Central Europe was modernized. The radar sites were converted from a manual plotting to the 412-L AWCS (Air Weapons and Control System) which was equipped with a data link. Similar to the Air Defense Command SAGE (Semi-Automatic Ground Environment), the 412-L system was coordinated by a Joint Test Center at Ramstein AB. The system became operational in April 1965, and in recognition of how well it accomplished its myriad missions and for implementing the single 412L Air Weapons Control System, the 86th AD received a second Air Force Outstanding Unit Award for the period from July 1964 to June 1965.

In June 1965, the mission of the 86th AD was changed to include not only air defense but offensive air operations. This change was due to the assignment of the 601st Tactical Control Squadron. However, in June 1966, the division reverted to a purely defensive role.

=== Inactivation ===
By 1968, the F-102s were phased out of the interceptor role in Europe, and replaced by the McDonnell Douglas F-4 Phantom II. The 86th Air Division lost the 496th, 525th and 526th FIS on 1 November 1968 when these squadrons were re-integrated into the parent wing at their home bases. As the 32d FIS at Soesterburg Air Base had no parent wing, it was reassigned to 17th Air Force. On 14 November 1968, the 86th AD was re-designated as the 86th Fighter-Interceptor Wing and inactivated. It was reactivated on 1 November 1969 as the 86th Tactical Fighter Wing.

== Major components ==
=== Fighter-Interceptor Squadrons ===
Initially 86th AD aircraft were in Air Defense Command Grey, although a few aircraft received by the 525th FIS had Arctic Red fins remaining from their former unit in the Alaskan Air Command.

The Division was composed of six fighter-interceptor squadrons, four in West Germany, one in France, and one in The Netherlands. In January 1959 the 525th Fighter-Interceptor Squadron at Bitburg Air Base received its first Convair F-102 Delta Dagger. In 1960, additional F-102s were received from Air Defense Command (ADC), equipping the 32d, 496th, 526th, 431st and 497th FIS. These aircraft were made available to USAFE by ADC as the F-102 was being replaced by the McDonnell F-101 Voodoo and the Convair F-106 Delta Dart as an interceptor.

The F-86D Sabre-equipped 513th FIS at Phalsbourg-Bourscheid AB, France and the 514th FIS at Ramstein AB, West Germany were both inactivated on 8 January 1961. On 18 May 1964, the 431st was reassigned to the 65th Air Division in Spain. and the 497th FIS was re designated 497th Tactical Fighter Squadron and transferred to George AFB, California .

Shortly after their arrival, Division aircraft added a sunburst pattern to their fins. This pattern was subdued in the summer of 1963 when Division units removed the sunburst pattern from their fins and flew in plain grey with the unit insignia usually carried on the fin. This was supplemented in 1965 with a horizontal band added to the fin in the same squadron color as the former sunburst pattern. In late 1965, the aircraft began to be converted to the Southeast Asia three-color camouflage pattern.

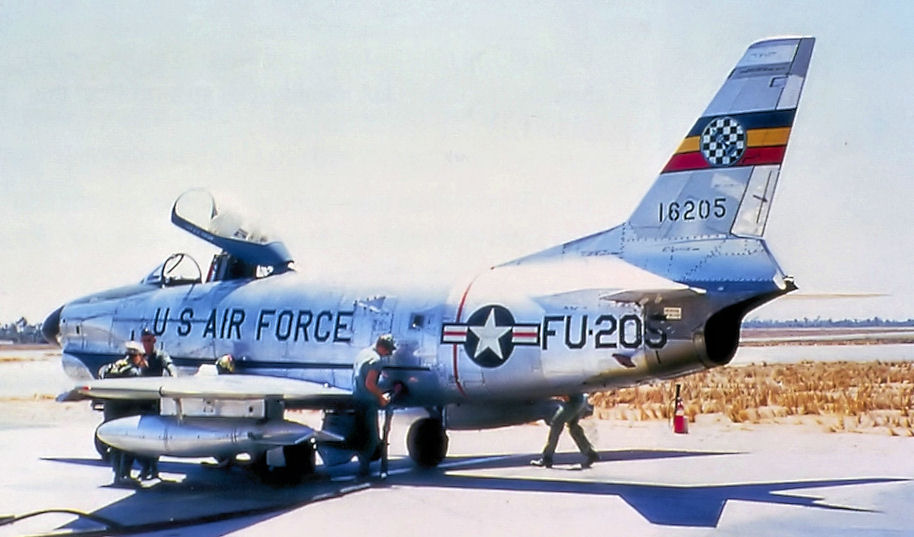
514th Fighter-Interceptor Squadron - North American F-86D 51-6205 at Ramstein AB, West Germany, about 1960

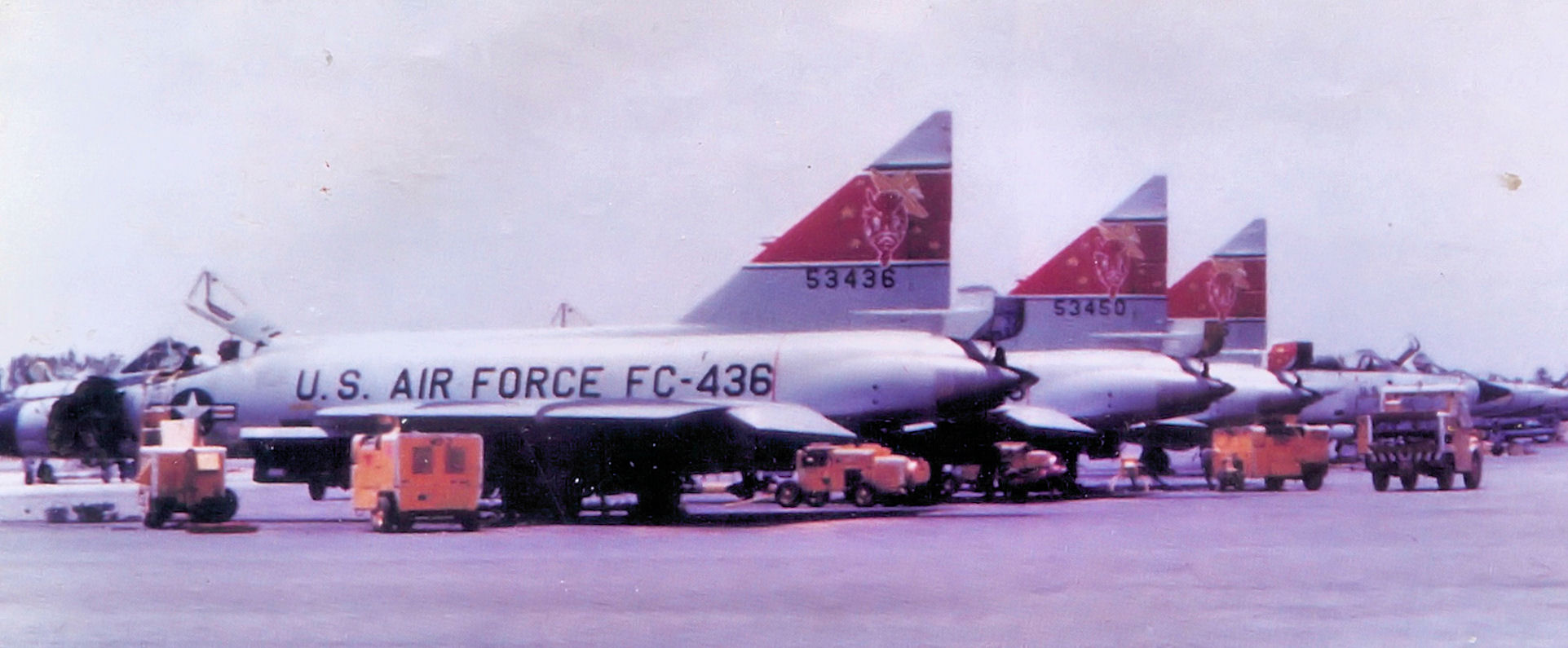
431st Fighter-Interceptor Squadron Convair F-102 Delta Daggers, shown at Wheelus Air Base, Libya for gunnery training, 1962.

- 32d Fighter-Interceptor Squadron, 18 November 1960 – 1 November 1968

F-102 Delta Dagger, Soesterberg AB, Netherlands

- 496th Fighter-Interceptor Squadron, 1960–1969

F-102 Delta Dagger, Hahn AB, West Germany

- 513th Fighter-Interceptor Squadron, 18 November 1960 – 8 January 1961

F-86D Sabre, Phalsbourg-Bourscheid AB, France (Inactivated)

- 514th Fighter-Interceptor Squadron, 18 November 1960 – 8 January 1961

F-86D Sabre, Ramstein AB, West Germany (Inactivated)

- 525th Fighter-Interceptor Squadron, 18 November 1960 – 1 November 1968

F-102 Delta Dagger, Bitburg AB, West Germany

- 526th Fighter-Interceptor Squadron. 18 November 1960 – 1 November 1968

F-102 Delta Dagger, Ramstein AB, West Germany

- 431st Fighter-Interceptor Squadron 1 July 1960 – 18 May 1964

F-102 Delta Dagger, Zaragoza AB, Spain (Transferred to the 65th Air Division)

- 497th Fighter-Interceptor Squadron, 1 July 1960 – 18 June 1964

F-102 Delta Dagger, Torrejon AB, Spain (Inactivated and transferred to Tactical Air Command)

F-104 Starfighter Attached units

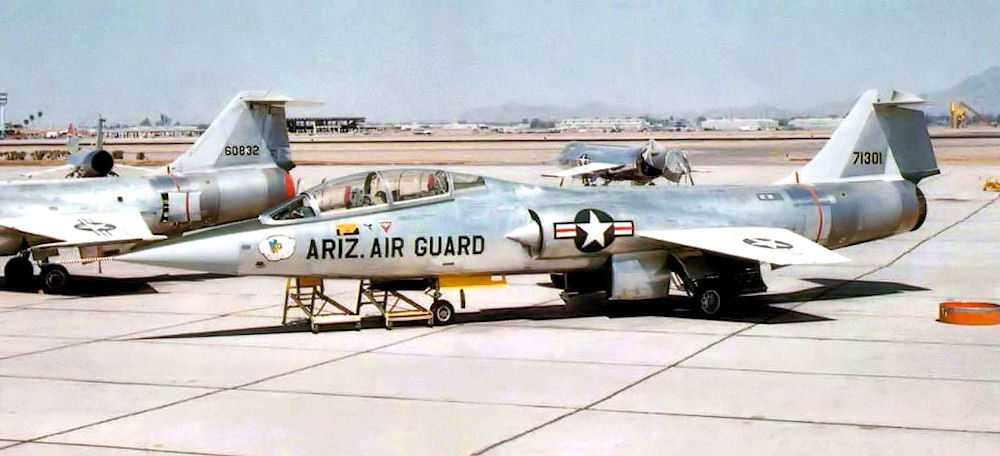
Arizona Air National Guard 197th Fighter-Interceptor Squadron, Lockheed F-104B Starfighter 57-1301

During the Berlin Crisis of 1961, three Air National Guard Lockheed F-104A Starfighter Squadrons were federalized and deployed to Europe to reinforce the 86th AD. The 151st FIS of the Tennessee Air National Guard and 197th FIS of the Arizona Air National Guard were assigned to Ramstein Air Base. The 157th FIS from the South Carolina Air National Guard was assigned to Moron AB Spain and was placed under the 65th Air Division. Following the end of the crisis, all of these ANG squadrons were returned to the United States by August 1962 and returned to state control.

- 151st Fighter-Interceptor Squadron: 19 December 1961 – 11 July 1962

F-104A Starfighter, Tennessee Air National Guard TDY to Ramstein AB, West Germany

- 157th Fighter-Interceptor Squadron: 25 November 1961 – 16 August 1962

F-104A Starfighter, South Carolina Air National Guard TDY to Moron AB, Spain

- 197th Fighter-Interceptor Squadron: 25 November 1961 – 11 July 1962

F-104A Starfighter, Arizona Air National Guard TDY to Ramstein AB, West Germany

=== Aircraft Control and Warning Squadrons ===
- 601st Tactical Control Squadron

HQ: Sembach Air Base, West Germany

Det 0001, Butzbach
Det 0003, Fulda
Det 0004, Wurtzburg
Det 0005, Bamberg
Det 0006, Grafenwohr
Det 0007, Straubing
Det 0100, Celle
Det 0200, Mannheim
Det 0300, Ulm

Equipment:AN/CPS-1 Microwave Early Warning (MEW) Radar mounted on a flatbed trailer, with the electronics in a separate van.

- 602d Aircraft Control & Warning Squadron

Giebelstadt Air Base, West Germany
Equipment: General Electric AN/MPS-11, FPS-90, General Electric AN/FPS-6 Radar

- 603d Aircraft Control & Warning Squadron

Langerkopf/Pforzheim Air Station, West Germany (Inactivated 25 June 1965).
Det 0001, Drachenbronn, France
Det 0600, Preum
Equipment: TPS-1D; TPS-10D; GPS-4

- 604th Aircraft Control & Warning Squadron

Freising, West Germany (Inactivated 10 February 1961)
Equipment: MIT AN/CPS-4,

- 606th Aircraft Control & Warning Squadron

Doebraberg, West Germany
Equipment: AN/FPS-67C, AN/FPS-6C, AN/FPS-90, 412L data processing equipment.

- 615th Aircraft Control & Warning Squadron

Birkenfeld, West Germany

Det 0001, Erbeskoph (412L SOC)
Det 0002, Rhein Main Air Base
Det 0003, Kindsbach (ADOC)
Det 0004, Lagerkoph (Manual SOC)
Det 0500, Giebelstadt Air Base

- 616th Aircraft Control & Warning Squadron

Tuerkheim/Wasserkuppe, West Germany
Equipment: AN/MPS-11, AN/MPS-14, AN/MPS-16, AN/GPS-4

- 807th Tactical Control Squadron

Kreuzberg, West Germany (TCC)

- FMAbt 312 (Flugmeldeabteilung = Aircraft control squadron)

Meßstetten, West Germany
West German Air Force (Attached)

== Lineage ==
- 86th Fighter-Interceptor Wing re-designated as 86 Air Division (Defense). 18 November 1960

Inactivated on 14 November 1968.

- Re-designated 86th Tactical Fighter Wing and activated 1 November 1969.

== Assignments ==
- United States Air Forces in Europe

Seventeenth Air Force, 18 November 1960

- United States Air Forces in Europe, 1 July 1963

Seventeenth Air Force, 1 September 1963

- United States Air Forces in Europe, 20 May 1965 - 14 November 1968

== Stations ==
- Ramstein Air Base, West Germany, 18 November 1960 - 14 November 1968

== Aircraft ==
- F-86D Sabre, 1960-1961
- F-102 Delta Dagger, 1960-1968
- F-104A Starfighter, 1961-1962

== See also ==
- List of United States Air Force air divisions
- 65th Air Division
