= Cretteville Airfield =

Cretteville Airfield Advanced Landing Ground (ALG) A-14
- Manche, Basse-Normandie Region, France
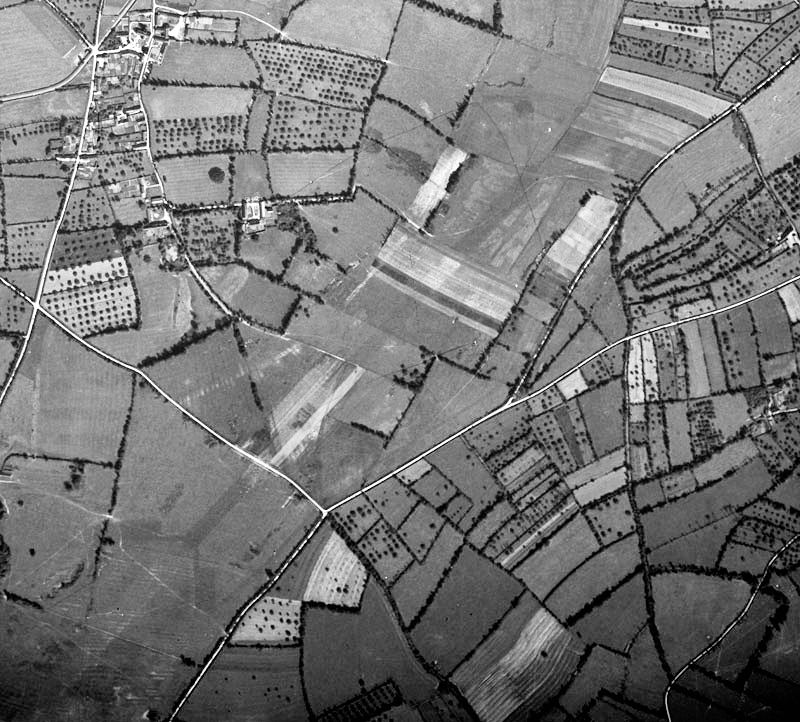
- Remains of Cretteville Airfield (A-14) after dismantling by the IX Engineering Command

Site information
- Type: Military Airfield
- Controlled by: United States Army Air Forces

Location
- Coordinates: 49°20′17″N 001°22′39″W

Site history
- Built by: IX Engineering Command
- In use: July–September 1944
- Materials: Prefabricated Hessian Surfacing (PHS)
- Battles/wars: World War II - EAME Theater: Normandy Campaign; Northern France Campaign

Garrison information
- Garrison: Ninth Air Force
- Occupants: 358th Fighter Group; 406th Fighter Group

Airfield information
Runways
Direction	Length and surface
04/22	3,600 feet (1,100 m) SMT/PSP
- One runway, 4 alert pads, 50 hardstands

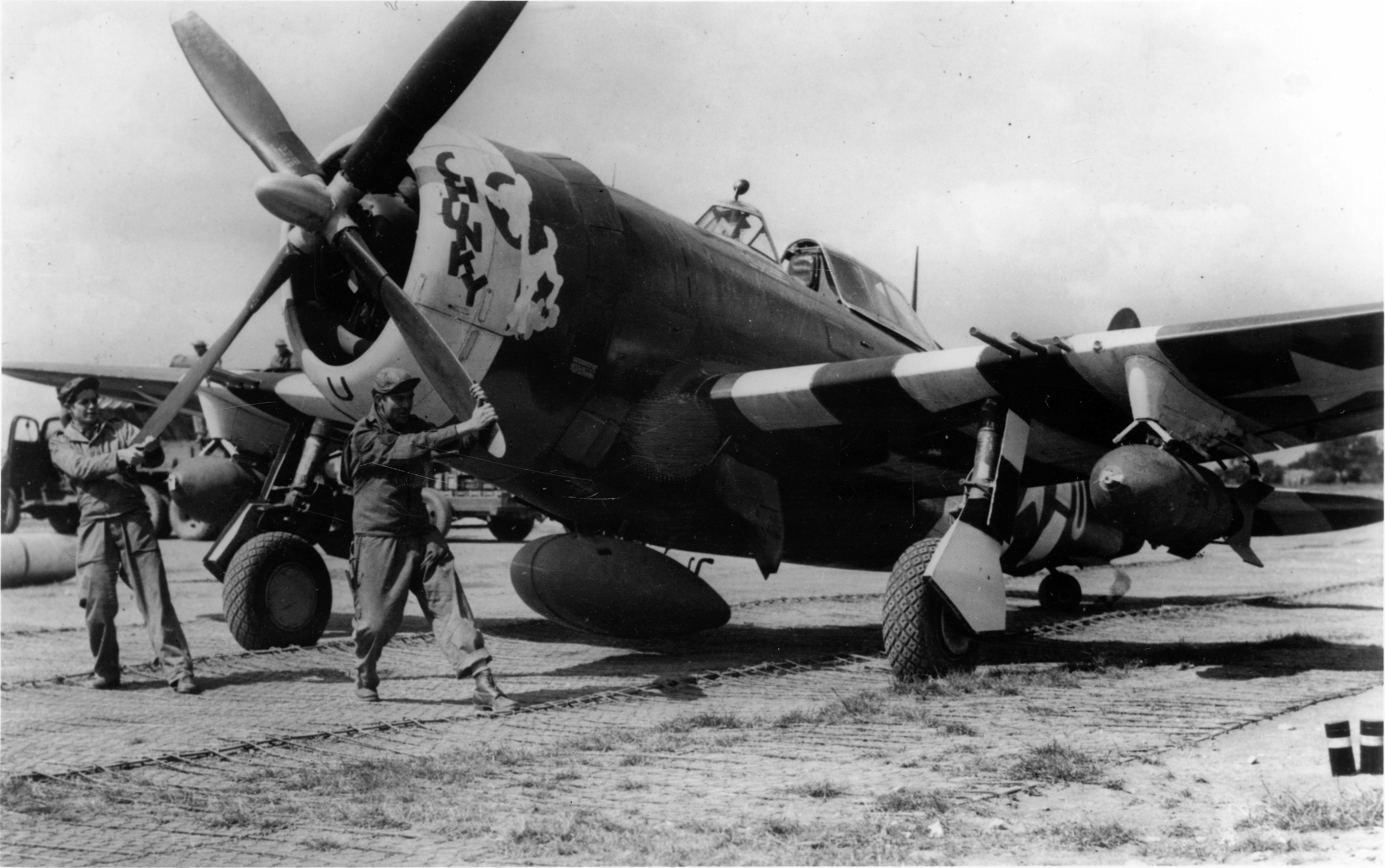
Ground personnel of the 358th Fighter Group prepare to start the engine of a P-47 Thunderbolt nicknamed "Chunky".

Cretteville Airfield is an abandoned World War II military airfield, which is located near the commune of Cretteville in the Normandy region of northern France.

Located to the southeast of Cretteville, the United States Army Air Force established a temporary airfield on 23 July 1944, shortly after the Allied landings in France The airfield was constructed by the IX Engineering Command, 819th Engineer Aviation Battalion.

== History ==
Known as Advanced Landing Ground "A-14", the airfield consisted of a single Prefabricated Hessian Surfacing runway. In addition, tents were used for billeting and also for support facilities; an access road was built to the existing road infrastructure; a dump for supplies, ammunition, and gasoline drums, along with a drinkable water and minimal electrical grid for communications and station lighting.

The airfield hosted the 358th and 406th Fighter Groups, both equipped with P-47 Thunderbolts. The fighter planes flew support missions during the Allied invasion of Normandy, patrolling roads in front of the beachhead; strafing German military vehicles and dropping bombs on gun emplacements, anti-aircraft artillery and concentrations of German troops in Normandy and Brittany when spotted. On 5 July the Group, benefiting from milder weather, was sent to support a large-scale attack in the region of Sainteny - Périers. Very heavy fighting between the American ground forces and Germans reinforced by the arrival of the 2nd SS Panzer without Périers area went fairly slowly. Regarding the aviation cooperation work system with ground troops becoming more effective despite a very aggressive flak causing many casualties.

After the Americans moved east into Central France with the advancing Allied armies, the airfield was used as a resupply and casualty evacuation airfield, before being closed on 5 September 1944. . The land returned to agricultural use.

== Major units assigned ==
- 365th (CH), 366th (IA), 367th (CP) Fighter Squadrons (P-47)
- 406th Fighter Group 17 August - 4 September 1944

512th (L3), 513th (4P), 514th (O7) Fighter Squadrons (P-47)

== Current use ==
Today there is little or no physical evidence of the airfield's existence, with the land being a mixture of grass meadows, agricultural fields and what appears to be a racetrack to the southeast of Cretteville . The outline of the wartime airfield is very evident by the shape of the fields and meadows.

A memorial to the men and units that were stationed at Cretteville Airfield was placed on the entrance wall of the castle of Franquetot along the D 223.

== See also ==
- Advanced Landing Ground
