= Saint-Léonard Airfield =

Saint-Léonard Airfield Advanced Landing Ground A-36

Site information
- Type: Military Airfield
- Controlled by: United States Army Air Forces

Location
- Coordinates: 47°56′33″N 000°03′18″E

Site history
- In use: 1944
- Battles/wars: Western Front (World War II)

Saint-Léonard Airfield is a former World War II airfield, located 1.8 km east of Louplande in the Pays de la Loire region, France.

== History ==
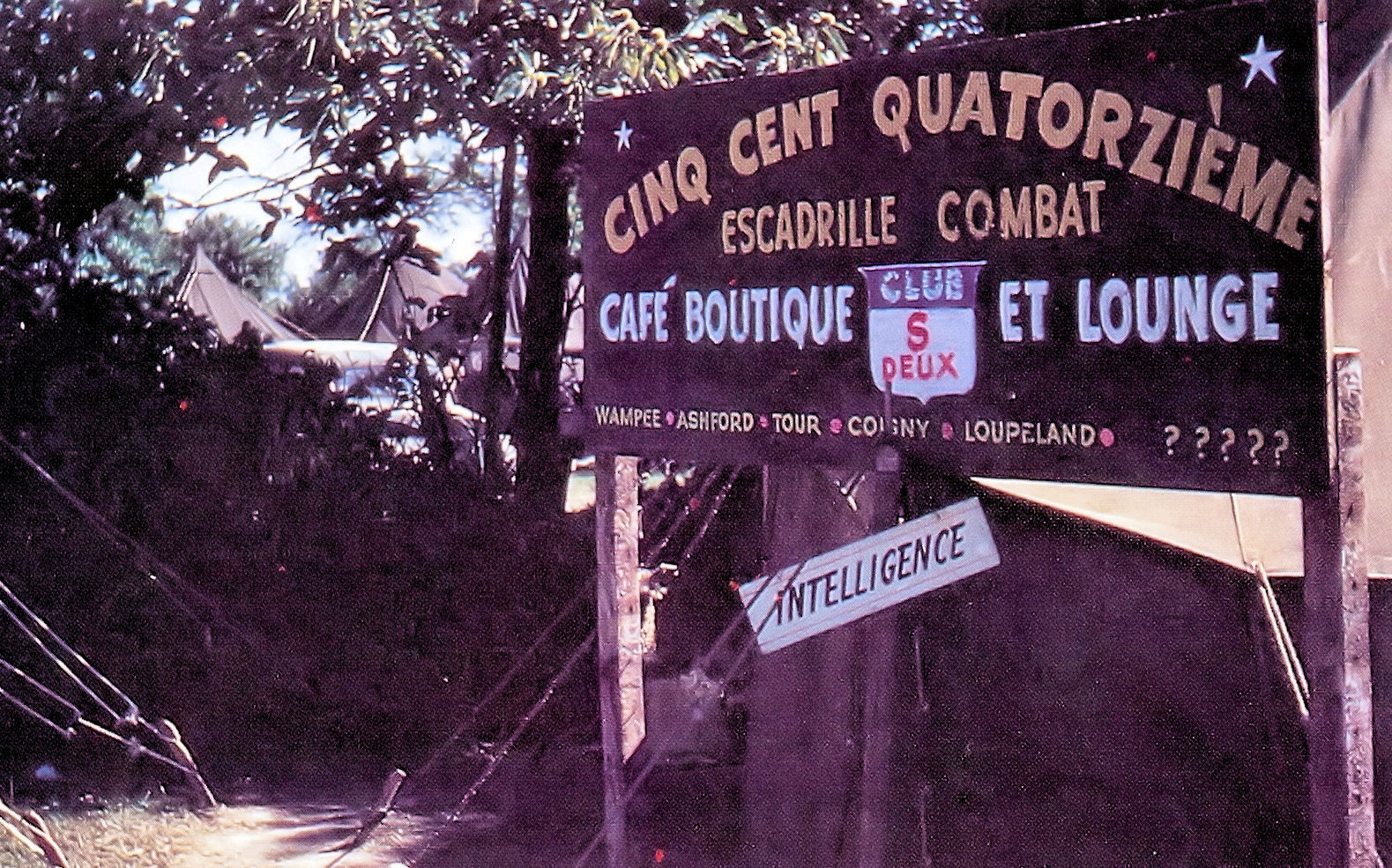
Saint-Léonard Airfield (A-46) 514th FS sign and tents Sep 1944

The airport was first established during World War II as a United States Army Air Forces Ninth Air Force Advanced Landing Ground in August 1944 to support the Northern France Campaign by Allied ground forces. Known as "St. Leonard Airfield" or simply "A-36", it was constructed by the IX Engineer Command, 846th Engineer Aviation Battalion.

The original construction was of Prefabricated Hessian Surfacing for a single runway of 5000' x 120' oriented north–south 00/18. In addition, tents were used for billeting and also for support facilities; an access road was built to the existing road infrastructure; a dump for supplies, ammunition, and gasoline drums, along with a drinkable water and minimal electrical grid for communications and station lighting.

The airfield was opened on 4 September 1944 and used by the 406th Fighter Group, which flew P-47 Thunderbolts from the field between 4 September and 4 October 1944.

The Americans moved east along with the advancing Allied forces in early October, turning the airfield over to French authorities. It was returned to agricultural use and nothing remains of the former airfield.
