= Tour-en-Bessin Airfield =

Tour-en-Bessin Airfield Advanced Landing Ground (ALG) A-13
- Basse-Normandie Region, France
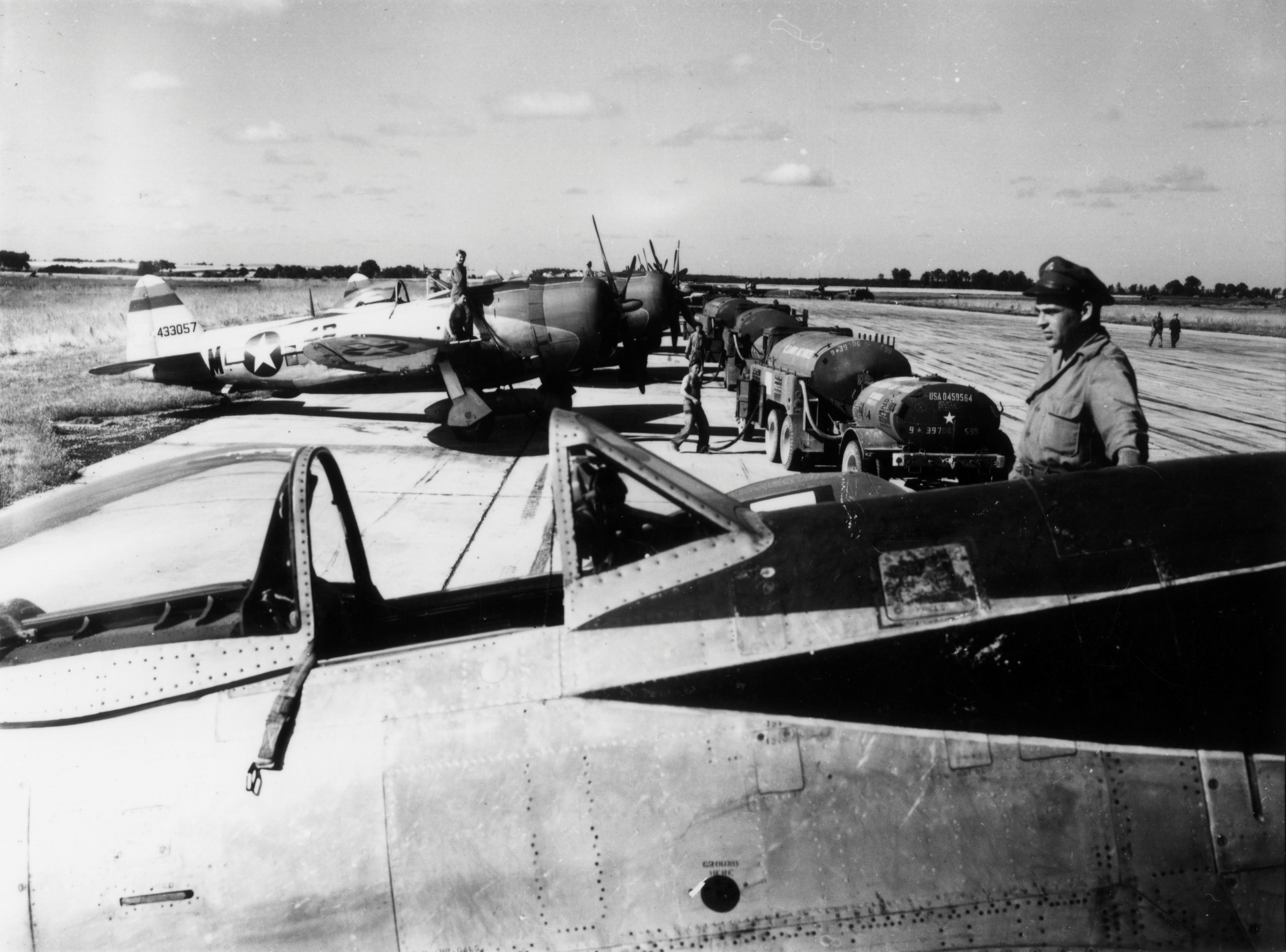
- Ground personnel of the 406th Fighter Group refuel P-47 Thunderbolts, including (serial number 44-33057) at Tour-en-Bessin Airfield

Site information
- Type: Military Airfield
- Controlled by: United States Army Air Forces

Location
- Coordinates: 49°17′45″N 000°45′41″W

Site history
- Built by: IX Engineering Command
- In use: July–December 1944
- Materials: Prefabricated Hessian Surfacing (PHS)
- Battles/wars: World War II - EAME Theater: Normandy Campaign; Northern France Campaign

Garrison information
- Garrison: Ninth Air Force
- Occupants: 373d Fighter Group; 406th Fighter Group; 394th Bombardment Group

Airfield information
Runways
Direction	Length and surface
12/30	5,000 feet (1,520 m) SMT/PSP
01/19	5,000 feet (1,520 m) SMT/PSP
- Two Runways, 4 alert pads, 50 hardstands

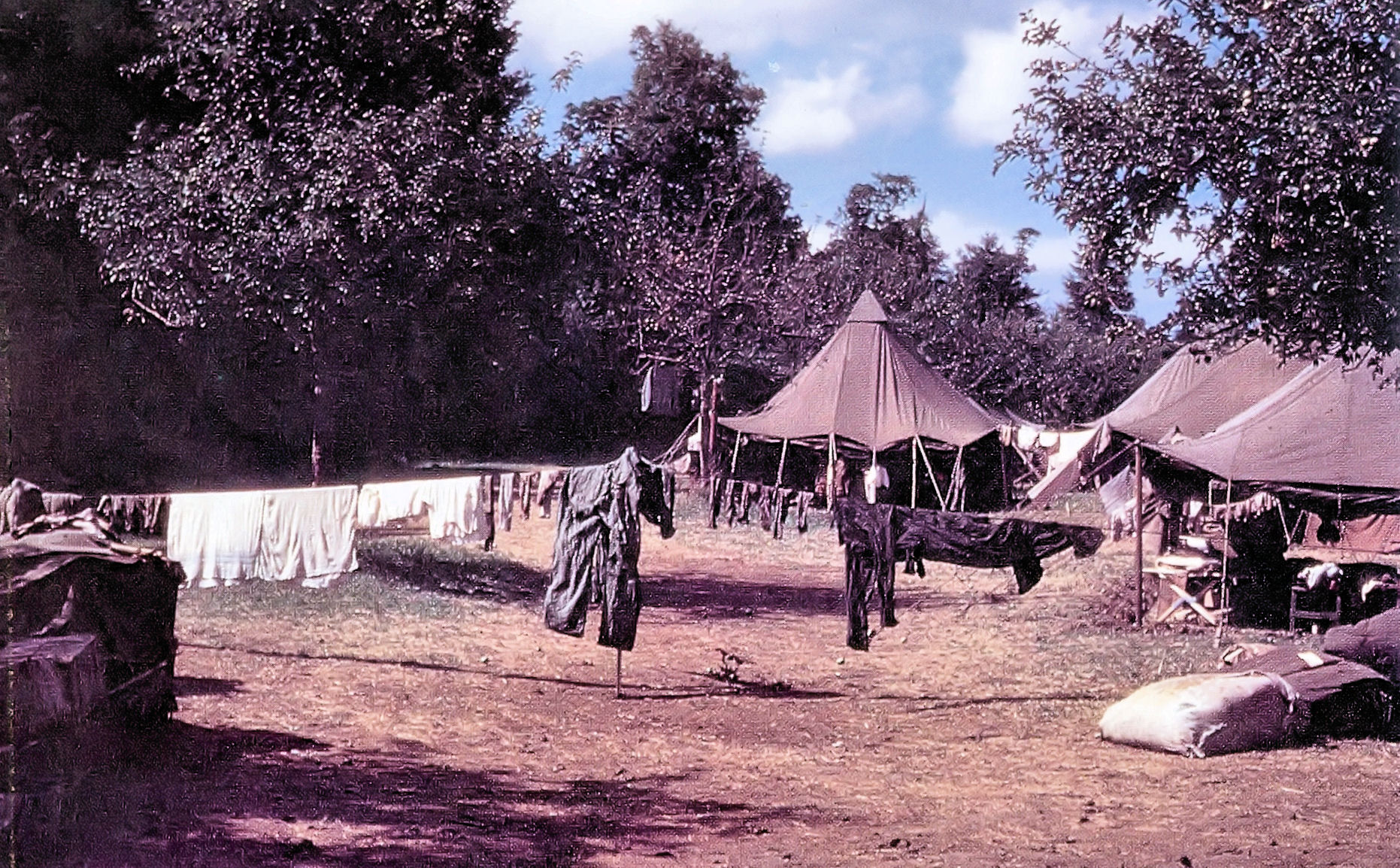
Tour-en-Bessin Airfield, France, 373d Fighter Group Facilities August 1944 not far from the D-Day beaches

Tour-en-Bessin Airfield is a now-abandoned World War II military airfield near the commune of Tour-en-Bessin in the Normandy region of northern France.

The United States Army Air Force established a temporary airfield on 12 July 1944, shortly after the Allied landings in France. It was constructed by the IX Engineering Command, 833rd and 846th Engineer Aviation Battalions.

== History ==
Known as Advanced Landing Ground "A-13", the airfield consisted of a main 5000 foot long (1500 m) pierced steel planking (PSP) runway aligned 12/30 and a secondary 5000 foot PSP runway aligned 01/19. Tents were used for billeting and support facilities. An access road was built to the existing road infrastructure, as were a dump for supplies, ammunition, and gasoline drums, along with a potable water and electrical power for communications and station lighting.

The 373rd and 406th Fighter Groups flew Republic P-47 Thunderbolts from Tour en Bessin. The fighters flew support missions during the Allied push into France, patrolling roads, strafing German military vehicles and bombing gun emplacements, anti-aircraft artillery, and concentrations of German troops in Normandy and Brittany. The Martin B-26 Marauder 394th Bombardment Group also was assigned to the airfield.

After US forces moved east into central France with the advancing Allied armies, the airfield was used as a resupply and casualty evacuation airfield for several months, before being closed on 22 December 1944. The land returned to agricultural use.

== Major units assigned ==
- 373rd Fighter Group 19 July - 19 August 1944

410th (R3), 411th (U9), 412th (V5) Fighter Squadrons (P-47)

- 406th Fighter Group 30 July - 17 August 1944

512th (L3), 513th (4P), 514th (O7) Fighter Squadrons (P-47)

- 394th Bombardment Group 25 August - 18 September 1944

584th (K5), 585th (4T), 586th (H9), 587th (SW) Bombardment Squadrons (B-26)

== Current use ==
Today there is little or no physical evidence of the airfield's existence, although the south end of the 01/19 runway is visible by the curvature of some fields, and some slight ground disturbance in a field to the east probably is from the 12/30 runway.

A memorial to the men and units that were stationed at Tour-en-Bessin was placed on the D613 (former N13) between Vaucelles and Tour-en-Bessin.
