= Metz-Frescaty Air Base =

Metz-Frescaty Air Base Base aérienne 128

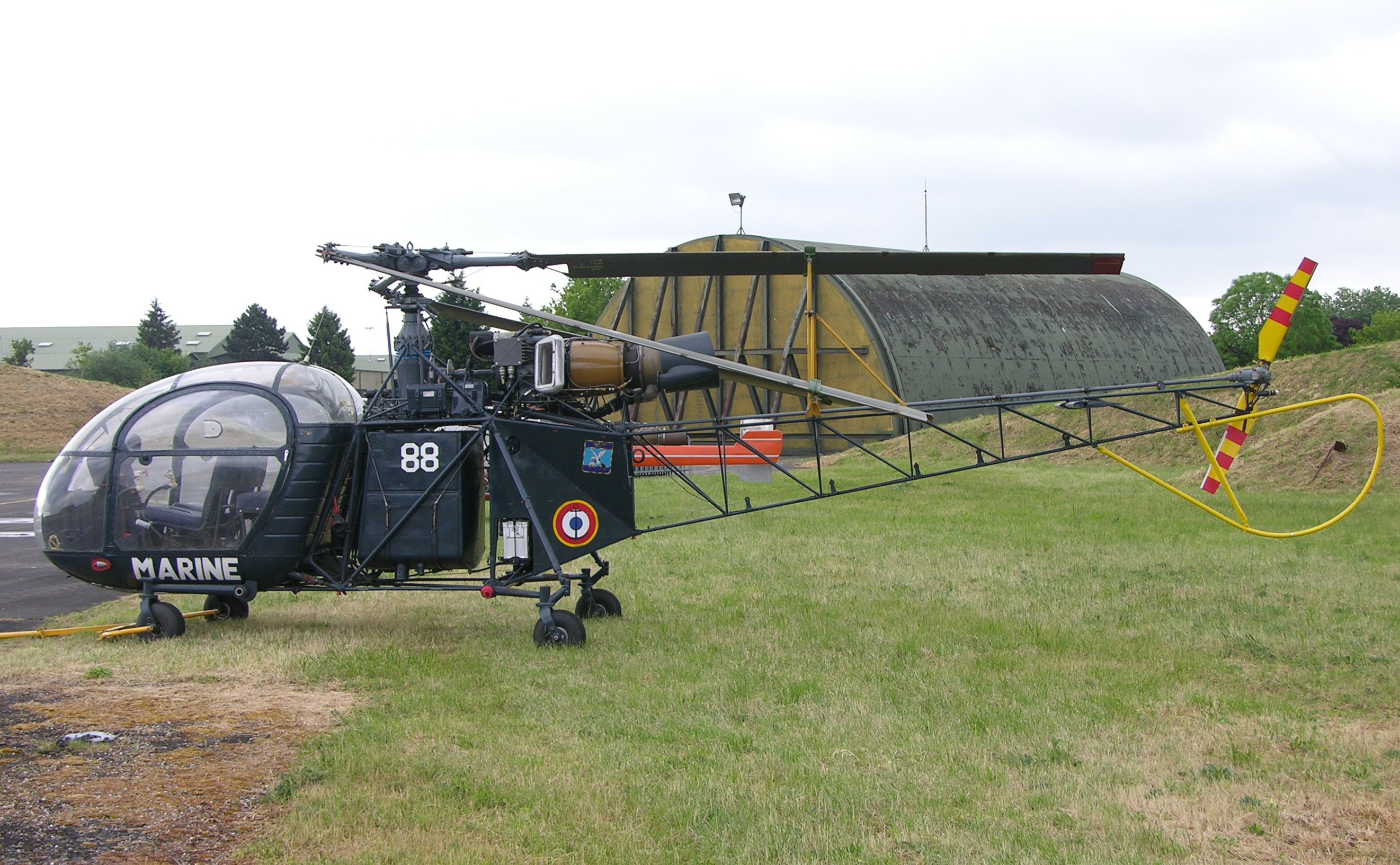
- French Navy Alouette II at Metz-Frescaty, May 2007
- IATA: MZM; ICAO: LFSF

Summary
- Airport type: Military
- Owner: Government of France
- Operator: Armée de l'air
- Location: Metz, France
- Elevation AMSL: 629 ft / 192 m
- Coordinates: 49°04′18″N 006°07′54″E

Map
- Location of Metz-Frescaty Air Base

Runways
Direction	Length		Surface
Direction	m	ft	Surface
01/19	2,400	7,874	Asphalt

Metz-Frescaty Air Base (French: Base aérienne 128 Metz-Frescaty) (IATA: MZM, ICAO: LFSF) was a front-line French Air Force French: Armée de l'Air (ALA) base. The base is located approximately 5 miles (8.0 km) south-southwest of Metz (Département de la Moselle, Lorraine), about 174 miles (280 km) east of Paris.

A military restructuring plan announced in July 2008 was to close BA 128 in 2011, and place it in reserve status (Base Interarmes).

== Major units assigned ==
Metz-Frescaty was primarily a command and control base.

- Staff of the Combat Air Force (FAC).
- 54th Air Intelligence Wing.
- Center for Mobile Detection and Control.
- Telecommunications Group.
- Combined Transport Squadron 1/40 "Moselle". (Eurocopter AS355; SOCATA TBM)
- Escadron électronique aéroporté 1/54 Dunkerque C-160 Transall "Gabriel" ELINT aircraft
- Company regional infrastructure.

== History ==
=== Origins ===
Following the defeat of France in the 1871 Franco-Prussian War, Metz and much of the Moselle were annexed by Germany as part of the Treaty of Frankfurt, and Metz became a "Garrison City" of the Imperial German Army (Reichsheer). In the early 20th century, the German army began building a Zeppelin field to the south-west of the city, at the present site of the airfield.

=== World War I ===
During World War I, in addition to the Zeppelins, the Luftstreitkräfte (Imperial German Army Air Service) began stationing aircraft at the airfield, which were later used in combat over the Western Front during the war. It became the target of French and British aircraft later in the war, starting about 1915 with the development of bomber and fighter combat aircraft. It also was the target for long-range artillery attacks.

Following the armistice with Germany ending the war, the French army entered Metz in November 1918, and the airfield came under the control of the French Air Force (Aéronautique Militaire).

=== Between the wars ===
In 1919, the first French Air Force units moved into Frescaty Air Base, when Bombardment Group No. 1 moved in from Landau in the occupied German Rhineland-Palatinate. On 1 August 1920, the unit was redesignated as the 11th Aviation Bombardment Regiment (11th RAB). In 1927, the 3d Group of the 12th Aviation Regiment was also assigned, moving from Neustadt an der Weinstraße, also in the Occupied Rhineland.

On 31 May 1934, Frescaty Air Base received the designation of base aérienne 111 (BA 111). The 11th Wing Frescaty left in 1936 and settled in Toulouse. Two years later, the transition from GB I/38 and II/38 on Amiot 143, causes the change in mission of the 38th Wing, which became the 38th Bombardment Wing in March 1939. By the following June 38 EB is reassigned to French North Africa.

=== Phony War and the Battle of France ===
At the outbreak of World War II on 3 September 1939, the CAG 506 and GR II/22 (flying Bloch MB.131 reconnaissance-bombers and Potez 630 heavy twin-engined fighters) were present at Frescaty.

Frescaty Air Base was bombed by the Luftwaffe on 10 May 1940 on the first day of the German attack in the West. After the Second Battle of Sedan (12–15 May 1940), GR II/22 was replaced by GR I/22. Frescaty Air Base was again attacked on 14 June, and was seized by the Wehrmacht shortly afterward.

=== German control during World War II ===
Under Luftwaffe control, the airfield was initially used as a night interceptor fighter base, with Nachtjagdgeschwader 4 (NJG 4) flying Messerschmitt Bf 110s and later RADAR-equipped Dornier Do 217s against the night attacks by the Royal Air Force on German targets. In 1943, a dive bomber school, Schlachtgeschwader 103 (SG 103) was established at the base, training pilots with Arado Ar 96 advanced trainers; Focke-Wulf Fw 190Fs, and Junkers Ju 87s.

The school closed in February 1944; the night fighters were reassigned in May. In June, day interceptor fighters of Jagdgeschwader 3 (JG 3) moved in with Messerschmitt Bf 109Gs to attack American Eighth Air Force heavy bombers. In July, Kampfgeschwader 101 (KG 101) arrived as part of the Mistel (German: Mistletoe), project, in which Junkers Ju 88A, bombers were controlled by a Messerschmitt Bf 109E, which was flown to the target by the fighter, then separated and guided, with a shaped 1,800 kg charge at the nose of the aircraft, and used as unmanned powered bomb. kg 101 flew several attacks against hardened Allied targets along the English channel coast.

These activities led to Frescaty being attacked by USAAF Ninth Air Force Martin B-26 Marauder medium bombers and Republic P-47 Thunderbolts mostly with 500-pound General-Purpose bombs; unguided rockets and .50 caliber machine gun sweeps when Eighth Air Force heavy bombers (Boeing B-17 Flying Fortresses, Consolidated B-24 Liberators) were within interception range of the Luftwaffe aircraft assigned to the base. The attacks were timed to have the maximum effect possible to keep the interceptors pinned down on the ground and be unable to attack the heavy bombers. Also the North American P-51 Mustang fighter-escort groups of Eighth Air Force would drop down on their return to England and attack the base with a fighter sweep and attack any target of opportunity to be found at the airfield.

=== American control ===
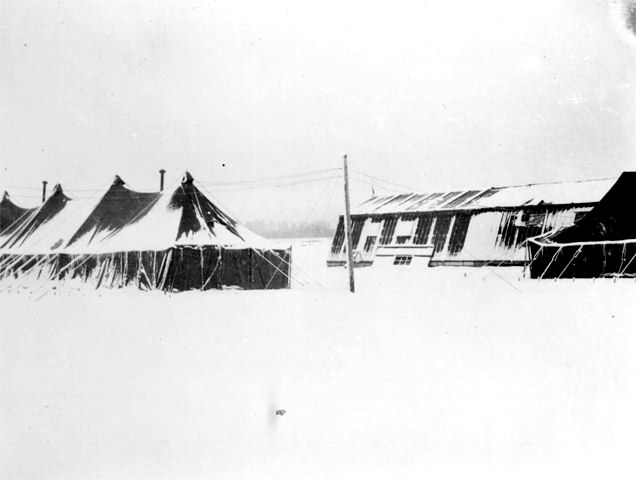
Y-34 Metz Airfield facilities during the winter of 1944/1945

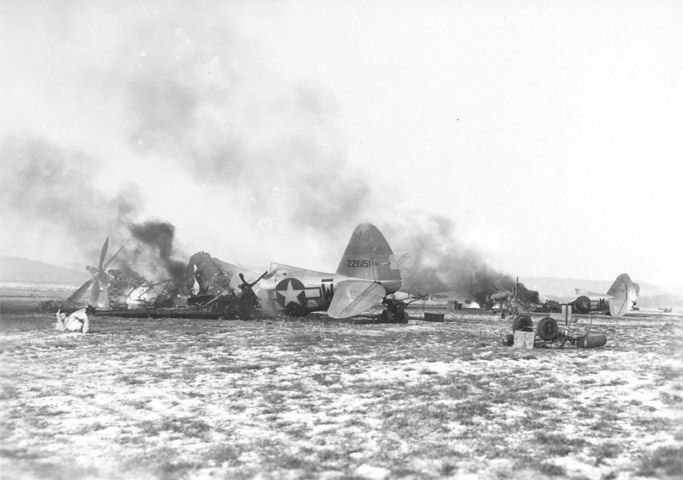
Destroyed P-47 Thunderbolts due to the attack by the Luftwaffe, 1 January 1945

In November 1944, American Third Army forces moved into the Metz area and heavy fighting ensued between the Allies and the German forces. On 29 November the airfield was taken from German control. Combat engineers from IX Engineer command moved in with the 830th Engineering Aviation Battalion arriving on 5 December. Due to the heavy fighting in the area and extensive damage from the Allied bombing attacks on the base, much restoration work was necessary. A new 5000' Pierced Steel Planking metal runway was laid down aligned 02/20 for aircraft use, and after nearly a month the airfield was declared operationally ready on 25 December 1944 as Advanced Landing Ground "Y-34 Metz".

Under American control, Metz Air Base was turned over to the Ninth Air Force, being used as a P-47 Thunderbolt combat fighter-bomber airfield for the rest of the war. Units which used the airfield were:

- 365th Fighter Group, 27 December 1944 – 30 January 1945
- 368th Fighter Group, 5 January-15 April 1945
- 406th Fighter Group, 2–8 February 1945
- 371st Fighter Group, 15 February-7 April 1945

The Luftwaffe Operation Bodenplatte (Unternehmen Bodenplatte) attacks on Metz Airfield by Jagdgeschwader 53 (JG 53) on 1 January 1945 from its base near Stuttgart (Echterdingen) with Bf 109Gs was part of the German last-ditch effort to achieve air superiority, even temporarily, over the Western Front. JG 53 destroyed or damaged about 40 Thunderbolts of the 365th Fighter Group in the attack, but the damage to the airfield was quickly repaired, the destroyed aircraft moved off the ramp, and replacements arrived within a few days to continue the attack. JG 53 retreated into Czechoslovakia and Austria before it was finally disbanded in April 1945.

On 29 May 1945, control of Metz Airfield was returned to the French Air Force.

=== Postwar ===
Although under French Air Force Control, the airfield was badly damaged by the war. Reconstruction began in April 1946. In 1950, when as a result of the Cold War threat of the Soviet Union, Metz-Frescaty was proposed by the United States Air Force to become an interim NATO fighter base, until other airfields could be constructed. In the ongoing negotiations, the site was ultimately rejected, and reconstruction of the base continued for French Air Force requirements.

The new paved jet runway was officially opened 20 July 1951, but the first French Air Force flying units were not assigned until April 1956 when 1/9 "Limousin" left BA 139 (Lahr, West Germany) and moved to Frescaty Air Base. Construction of the facility continued until 1956. The air base was designated base aérienne 128 (BA 128) during the summer of 1956. During the past 50 years, many units have been assigned to the base, flying a wide variety of aircraft. The last combat unit was reassigned on 31 August 2004.

The RCAF #1 Air Division HQ was at Metz controlling 4 Wings ( of 3 Squadrons) at Stations in France and Germany and also supporting Stations in Britain. During this time support, transport and fighter aircraft of the RCAF used this aerodrome from 1953.

Until closure, Metz-Frescaty Air Base was a fully equipped front line French Air Force Base, primarily being used for command, control and training along with electronic warfare.

The base closed on 31 August 2012. As at September 2019, the airfield runway is marked (with Xs) as not usable for landings.

== See also ==
- Advanced Landing Ground
