= Mourmelon-le-Grand Airfield =

Mourmelon-le-Grand Advanced Landing Ground (ALG) A-80
- Champagne-Ardenne Region, France

Site information
- Type: Military airfield
- Controlled by: United States Army Air Forces

Location
- Coordinates: 49°06′45″N 004°22′20″E

Site history
- Built by: IX Engineering Command
- In use: September 1944 – July 1945
- Materials: Pierces Steel Planking (PSP)
- Battles/wars: Western Front (World War II); Northern France Campaign

Mourmelon-le-Grand Airfield is an abandoned World War II military airfield in France. It lies approximately 1 mile (2 km) east-southeast of Mourmelon-le-Grand and 93 miles (150 km) northeast of Paris.

The airfield was a semi-permanent facility built by the USAAF in the Champagne region west of Monte Carnillet which was a fiercely contested region of the World War I Western Front. The 6000' (1830 m) Pierced Steel Planking runway of the airfield supported fighter and transport aircraft from September 1944 through the end of the war in Europe.

== History ==
Known as Advanced Landing Ground "A-80", the airfield consisted of a single 6000' PSP runway aligned 08/26. Tents were used for billeting and for support facilities; an access road was built to the existing road infrastructure; there was a staging area for supplies, ammunition, and gasoline drums. There were a water-treatment facility and a minimal electrical grid for communications and station lighting.

Combat units stationed at the airfield were:

- 406th Fighter Group, 22 September 1944 – 2 February 1945 (P-47 Thunderbolt)
- 358th Fighter Group, 16 October – 9 November 1944 (P-47)
- 434th Troop Carrier Group, March – 24 July 1945 (C-47 Skytrain)

After the war ended the facility was dismantled and the land was turned over to local French authorities. Today the remains of the airfield can be seen in aerial photography as a disturbed area south of Mourmelon-le-Grand.

== See also ==
- Advanced Landing Ground
