= December 2017 Diffa Region clash =

Chad Basin clash
- Part of the Boko Haram insurgency and the US military intervention in Niger
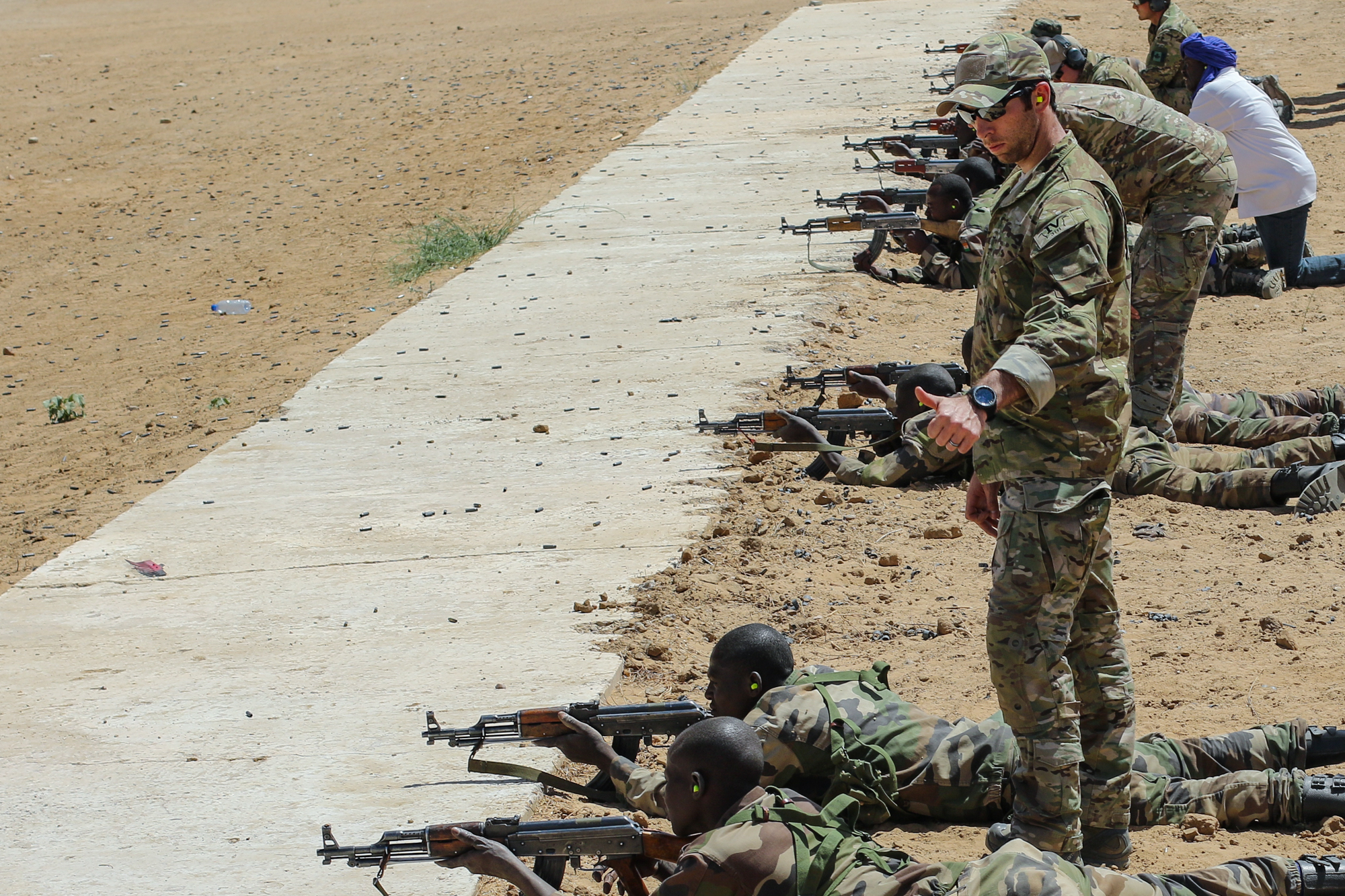
- US and Nigerien soldiers training together in Diffa, on 28 February 2017.
Date	6 December 2017
Location	Near Diffa, Diffa Region, Niger
Result	Nigerien-American victory

Belligerents
Niger (United States) Army Special Forces	Islamic State – West Africa Province

Casualties and losses
None	11 killed: 2 suicide bombers; 1 weapons cache destroyed

In the early morning hours of 6 December 2017, ISWAP militants attacked a patrol of US Army Special Forces and Nigerien soldiers near Diffa, Diffa Region, Niger. During the ensuing firefight, Nigerien and American personnel suffered no casualties while 11 militants, including two wearing suicide vests, were killed. An enemy weapons cache was also destroyed by the joint US/Nigerien force. The firefight was not planned as the purpose of the mission was aimed at setting "the conditions for future partner-led operations against violent extremist organizations in the region".

The attack came a little over two months after the deadly ambush in the village of Tongo Tongo that left at least 30 dead including four American Special Forces personnel. The December firefight was not initially reported and only learned three months later after a declassified report made for Congress was obtained by The New York Times. The firefight is just one of 10 other incidents involving American personal in Niger. During these previous firefights, excluding the ambush that happened two months earlier, only a few enemy combatants were killed while no Americans or Nigeriens were hurt.

This event and, most prominently, the October ambush led to security changes for US forces operating in the region such as armored vehicles instead of lightly armored SUV's, the arming of drones, and taking a closer look at when US forces conduct operations with local troops.
