= Battle of Abanguilou =

Coordinates: 15°25′21″N 3°1′23″E

- Part of Mali War
Date	19 December 2018
Location	Abanguilou, near Anderamboukane, Mali
Result	French-MSA victory

Belligerents
Movement for the Salvation of Azawad; France	Islamic State in the Greater Sahara

Casualties and losses
3 killed, 2 wounded (per MSA); None	Total: ~18 killed 12 killed (per MSA); 6 killed (per France)
- 6 civilians killed

The battle of Abanguilou took place on December 19, 2018, between the Movement for the Salvation of Azawad (MSA) and their French allies against the Islamic State in the Greater Sahara (ISGS).

== Prelude ==
On December 19, 2018, a nomadic camp in the village of Abanguilou, near Andéramboukane, was attacked by armed men, allegedly ISGS militants. The attackers executed six civilians, and looted the camp.

== Battle ==
Following the attack on the nomadic camp, Tuareg fighters in the MSA set off in pursuit of the ISGS militants, who were fleeing towards the border with Niger. The MSA fighters caught up, and clashes broke out between the two groups.

That same day, a French MQ-9 drone flying above Niger spotted a group of men on eight motorcycles heading back towards the border with Mali. Once the group crossed the border, and was assessed by French officials as being the perpetrators of the Abanguilou killings, the militants were killed by a French airstrike. French ground forces were then deployed. The ground forces, when assessing the damage, discovered a Glock-19 pistol that belonged to Jeremiah W. Johnson, an American soldier killed in the Tongo Tongo ambush a year prior.

== Aftermath ==
The MSA stated in a press release that three fighters were killed in the clashes, and two were wounded. The group also stated a dozen ISGS fighters were killed. The French army stated six jihadists were killed and five motorcycles were destroyed.
