= AB 201 =

AB 201 may refer to:

- Niger Air Base 201
- Stoney Trail, also known as Alberta Highway 201
