= Naylor Road =

Naylor Road may refer to:

== Transportation ==
- Maryland Route 637, also known as Naylor Road, a state highway in Hillcrest Heights, Maryland
- Naylor Road Line, a former MetroBus route
- Naylor Road station, a Metro station in Hillcrest Heights, Maryland

== Other uses ==
- Doundou Chefou, Nigerian militant, codenamed "Naylor Road" by the United States
