= 435th Air Expeditionary Wing =

Expeditionary unit of the US Air Force responsible for supporting operations in Africa

435th Air Expeditionary Wing

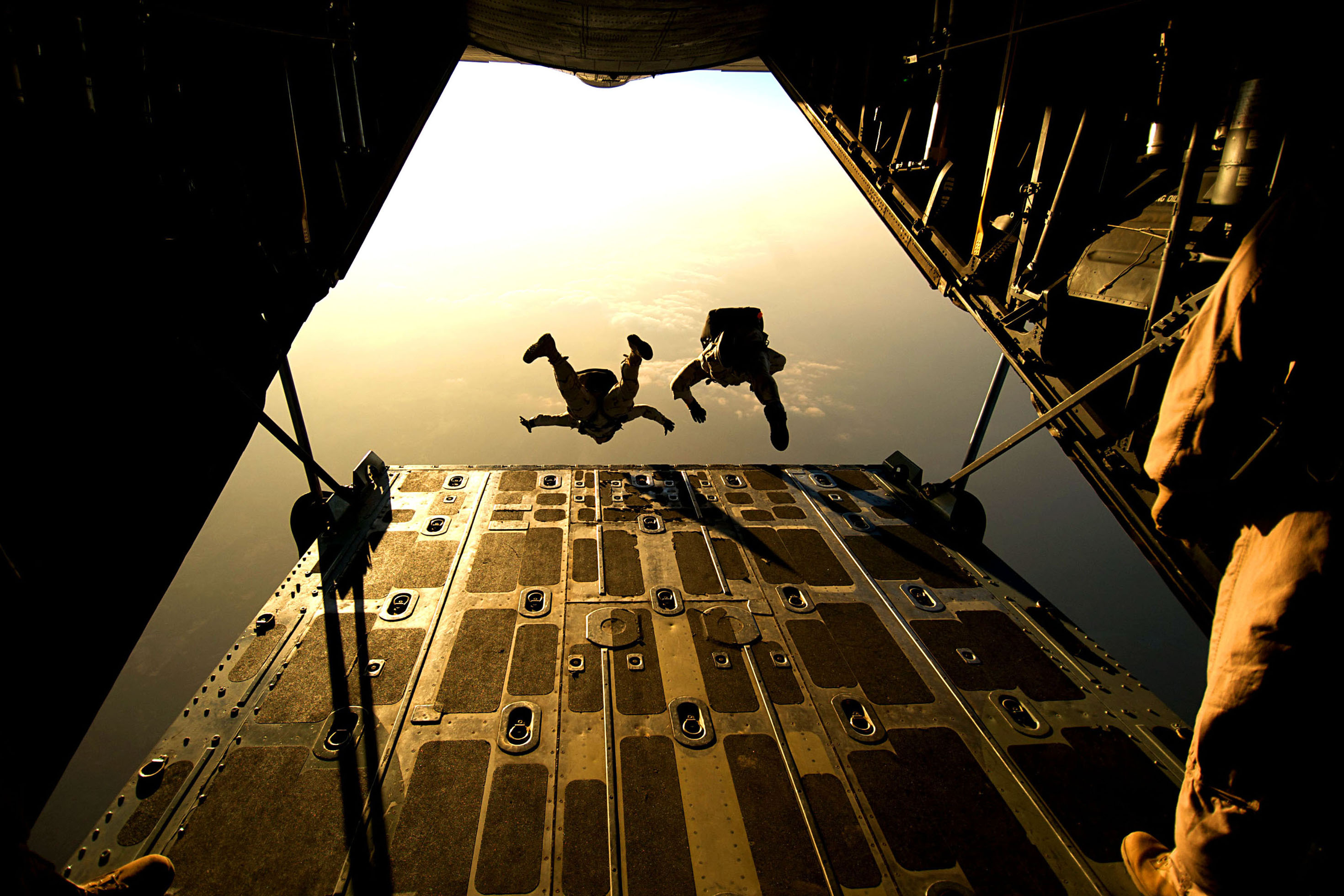
- Pararescuemen of the wing's 82nd Expeditionary Rescue Squadron jump from an HC-130 Hercules during an exercise off the coast of Djibouti in 2008
- Active: 2013–2023
- Country: United States
- Branch: United States Air Force
- Part of: United States Air Forces in Europe – Air Forces Africa: Third Air Force
- Garrison/HQ: Ramstein Air Base, Germany
- Decorations: Air Force Meritorious Unit Award

Insignia
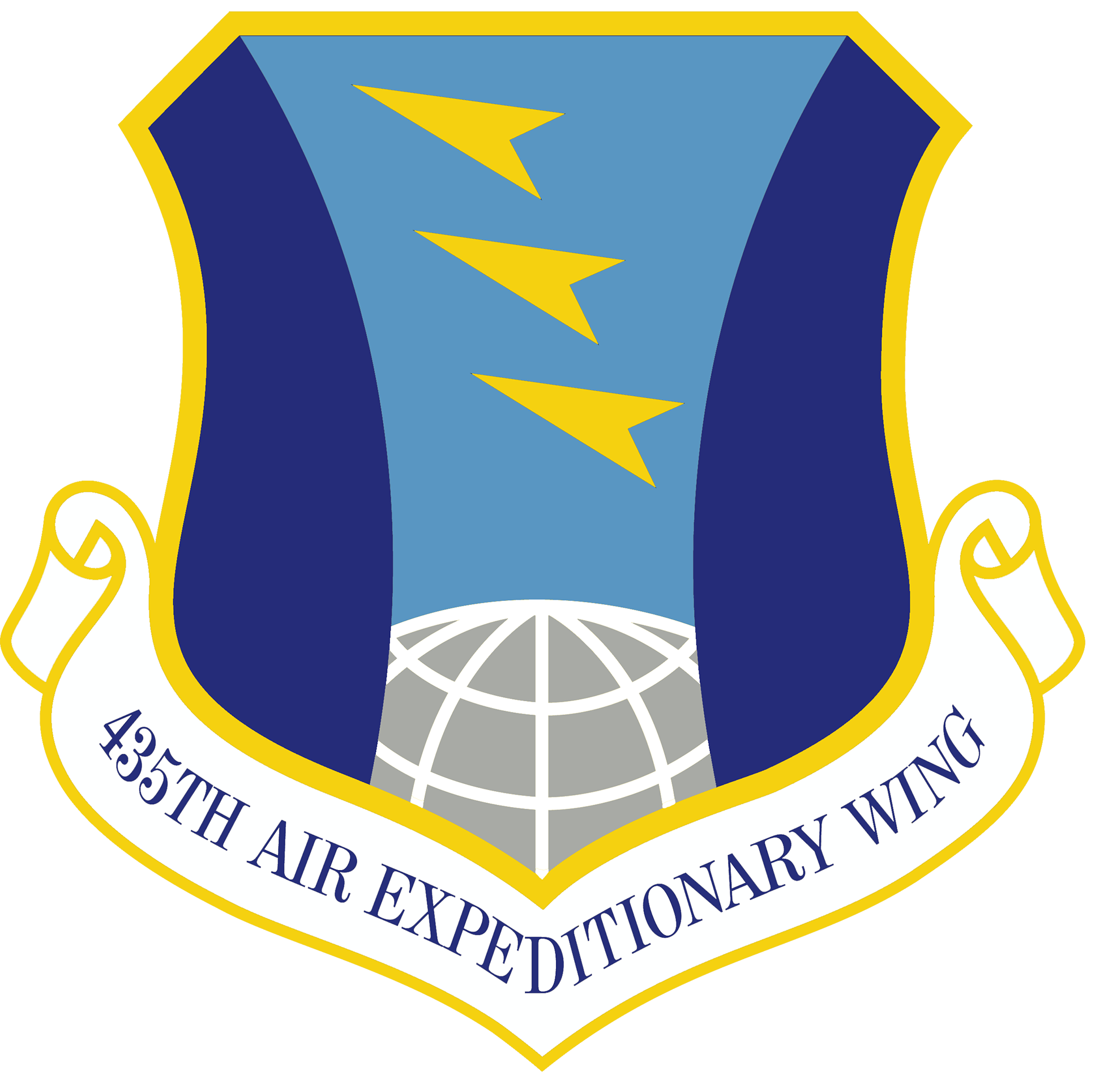
- 435th Air Expeditionary Wing emblem

Aircraft flown
- Attack: MQ-9
- Transport: C-130

The United States Air Force's 435th Air Expeditionary Wing (435 AEW) is an inactive air expeditionary unit assigned to the Third Air Force, last stationed at Ramstein Air Base, Germany. As of 2022, the wing had forward deployed units in six locations in West and East Africa. Its command staff is also exercised command of the 435th Air Ground Operations Wing.

On 9 June 2023, the wing was inactivated during a ceremony at Ramstein Air Base, with its components becoming part of the 406th Air Expeditionary Wing, which was activated at Ramstein the same day.

Among the missions conducted or supported by the unit were medical evacuation, logistics support, ISR and aerial refueling. For its ISR mission, the wing utilizes MQ-9 Reaper drones, having the US Air Force's only active-duty MQ-9 unit deployed to the region under its command.

== Units ==
As of 2022, the 435th Air Expeditionary Wing was made up of two groups, which in turn consisted of ten squadrons:

- 409th Air Expeditionary Group (409 AEG) (Nigerien Air Base 201, Niger)
  - 324th Expeditionary Reconnaissance Squadron (324 ERS) (Naval Air Station Sigonella, Italy)
  - 409th Expeditionary Security Forces Squadron (409 ESFS)
  - 724th Expeditionary Air Base Squadron (724 EABS)
  - 768th Expeditionary Air Base Squadron (768 EABS) (Nigerien Air Base 101, Niger)
- 449th Air Expeditionary Group (449 AEG) (Camp Lemonnier, Djibouti)
  - 12th Expeditionary Special Operations Squadron (12 ESOS) (Chabelley Airfield, Djibouti)
  - 75th Expeditionary Airlift Squadron (75 EAS)
  - 82nd Expeditionary Rescue Squadron (82 ERQS)
  - 475th Expeditionary Air Base Squadron (475 EABS) (Manda Bay Airfield, Kenya)
  - 726th Expeditionary Mission Support Squadron (726 EMSS)
  - 776th Expeditionary Air Base Squadron (776 EABS) (Chabelley Airfield, Djibouti)
