= List of Air Expeditionary units of the United States Air Force =

Air Expeditionary Wings and Groups are a Wing/Group concept used by the United States Air Force. These units are activated under temporary orders by the owning Major Command (MAJCOM) for a specific purpose or mission. Once that mission is completed, these units are inactivated.

== Origins ==
Faced with declining budgets in the late 1990s, the U.S. Air Force decided that the Operation Northern Watch and Operation Southern Watch (ONW/OSW) patrols over Iraq were "tedious". The patrols placed more strain on units worldwide than during the Cold War. This was because so many fighter, bomber, air refueling, and airlift squadrons had been inactivated after the end of the Cold War. The Air Force "had to change the way it did business".

As the no-fly zone patrols over Iraq began to appear as an ongoing, open-ended commitment, the drain on equipment and manpower forced the Air Force to reconsider how it was going to sustain ONW/OSW patrols, as well as other required deployments worldwide. The answer developed was to end the deployment of entire wings en bloc.

After considerable planning to cover the absence of a replacement for USS Independence (CV-62) and her air wing for six weeks, "the Chairman of the JCS directed Air Combat Command to deploy an Air Expeditionary Force to Bahrain not later than October 19, 1995, for a period not to exceed 120 days. After some last-minute changes, 18 F–16s deployed to Shaikh Isa Air Base [in Bahrain] on October 28, 1995. Air Expeditionary Force I arrived fully armed and began to fly sorties within 12 hours of its initial landings. It returned to the United States on December 18, 1995. Air Expeditionary Force I deployed 675 people and flew 705 sorties."

It was decided that U.S. Central Command Air Forces (CENTAF) would not consist of permanently assigned units, partially because of the sensitivities of Arab host states to acknowledging that U.S. forces were deployed in their countries. This made establishment of permanent units more difficult, because base access might be changed or denied with shifting, volatile, political currents. For example, during the 2003 invasion of Iraq, the Jordanian government denied U.S. troops were stationed in Jordan. This created a lot of concern with Jordanian military personnel stationed at Shahid Muafaq Al-Salti Air Base during the initial stages. As they were being told on television and radio that there were no U.S. troops on Jordanian soil, USAF C-17 aircraft were arriving on a daily basis with personnel and supplies. The 410th Air Expeditionary Wing was quickly growing in size. Out of confusion, Jordanian Security Forces documented everything leaving the aircraft. U.S. personnel removed labels and explosive decals from the containers, as not to aggravate the situation. American troops initially were not allowed to carry weapons in plain sight. So they carried their Beretta 9mm handguns hidden in their waistbands for protection and hid their M-4 carbines from view in their vehicles.

To minimize the risk of these kind of situations happening, the decision was taken to avoid the creation of permanent units, especially in the Middle East.

Instead, elements from different wings, even from both the active-duty component and the Air Force Reserves and Air National Guard, would be melded together for each deployment. This merging of different units from different permanent wings/groups was christened the "Air Expeditionary Force" (AEF) concept. The various units were to be drawn from Air Combat Command or ACC gained components, but also from other major commands such as Pacific Air Forces (PACAF) or United States Air Forces in Europe (USAFE), as necessary, to meet mission requirements. AEF organizations were to be fundamentally temporary in nature, organized to meet a specific mission or commitment. They thus replaced the "Provisional" deployed units attached to the command during the 1991 (Persian) Gulf War.

== Active Air Expeditionary wings and groups ==
=== Active Air Expeditionary Wings (AEW) ===
Unit	Emblem	Location	Country	Command & (Numbered AF)	Date activated	Mission
320th Air Expeditionary Wing		Joint Base Anacostia-Bolling,	United States	Air Force District of Washington	2006	USAF component of Joint Task Force National Capital Region. Commanded concurrently by the Commander, Air Force District of Washington.
332nd Air Expeditionary Wing		Muwaffaq Salti Air Base as of 2020	Jordan as of 2020	US Air Forces Central (9th AF)	May 2015	Fighters, CSAR and ISR in the US Central Command area of responsibility.
378th Air Expeditionary Wing		Prince Sultan Air Base	Saudi Arabia	US Air Forces Central (9th AF)	December 2019	Supports Air and Missile Defense and provides fighter and tanker staging in the US Central Command area of responsibility.
379th Air Expeditionary Wing		Al-Udeid Air Base	Qatar	US Air Forces Central (9th AF)	2002	Tanker, airlift, aeromedical evacuation and high altitude surveillance in the US Central Command area of responsibility.
380th Air Expeditionary Wing		Al Dhafra Air Base	United Arab Emirates	US Air Forces Central (9th AF)	January 2002	Tanker and ISR aircraft in the US Central Command area of responsibility.
386th Air Expeditionary Wing		Ali Al Salem Air Base	Kuwait	US Air Forces Central (9th AF)	September 2000	Airlift aircraft and airlift hubs in the US Central Command area of responsibility.
406th Air Expeditionary Wing		Ramstein Air Base	Germany	US Air Forces in Europe – Air Forces Africa (3rd AF)	2023	Supports US Africa Command operations, with subordinate Air Expeditionary Groups deployed to locations throughout Africa.
432nd Air Expeditionary Wing		Creech Air Force Base	United States	US Air Forces Central (9th AF)	2002	Designation used by the 432nd Wing when remotely operating the MQ-9B Reaper or RQ-170 Sentinel in support of US Central Command.

=== Active Air Expeditionary Groups (AEG) ===
Unit	Emblem	Location	Country	Wing	Date activated	Mission
13th Air Expeditionary Group		Christchurch International Airport	New Zealand	Direct Report to 13th EAF	Unknown	Air component of the Joint Task Force-Support Forces Antarctica (JTF-SFA), operating the C-17A Globemaster III and Lockheed LC-130 Hercules as part of Operation Deep Freeze. A forward operating location is based at McMurdo Station in Antarctica.
387th Air Expeditionary Group		Cargo City	Kuwait	386th AEW	2003	Operates the Theater Logistics Gateway at Cargo City and operates at Ali Al Salem AB in Kuwait in support of operations in the US Central Command area of responsibility.
401st Air Expeditionary Group		RAF Mildenhall	United Kingdom	435th AGOW	Unknown	Exercises administrative and operational command over 435th Air Ground Operations Wing task organized detachments, active-duty units, or Guard/Reserve forces to execute specific European Theater contingency missions.
404th Air Expeditionary Group		Ramstein Air Base	Germany	406th AEW	October 2008	Provides dedicated intra-theater airlift support for the US Africa Command area of responsibility. Subordinate units forward deploy to locations throughout Africa.
449th Air Expeditionary Group		Camp Lemonnier	Djibouti	406th AEW	2008	Provides combat search and rescue and maintains surveillance and reconnaissance capabilities for the Combined Joint Task Force - Horn of Africa.

== Inactive Air Expeditionary wings and groups ==
Unit	Emblem	Headquarters Location	Country	Command	Dates last active	Mission
16th Air Expeditionary Wing		Aviano Air Base	Italy	US Air Forces in Europe – Air Forces Africa	June 1997 – June 2003	Supported Operation Allied Force and subsequent operations in the Balkans from Aviano and several forward operating bases throughout the region. Replaced by the 401st Air Expeditionary Wing.
40th Air Expeditionary Wing		Diego Garcia Air Base	British Indian Ocean Territory	Pacific Air Forces	October 2001 – August 2006	Supported strategic bomber operations during Operation Enduring Freedom in Afghanistan.
64th Air Expeditionary Group		Eskan Village Compound	Saudi Arabia	US Air Forces Central	2005–2014	Provided security and force support at Eskan Village Compound during Operation Iraqi Freedom and Operation New Dawn whilst assigned to the 379th Air Expeditionary Wing.
313th Air Expeditionary Wing		Morón Air Base	Spain	Air Mobility Command	March – October 2011	Operated the KC-135 Stratotanker and KC-10 Extender as part of Operation Odyssey Dawn and NATO's Operation Unified Protector in relation to the Libyan Civil War.
321st Air Expeditionary Wing		New Al Muthana Air Base	Iraq	US Air Forces Central	August 2002 – December 2011	Supported the Iraq Training and Advisory Mission (ITAM)-Air Force.
322nd Air Expeditionary Group		Souda Bay Air Base	Greece	US Air Forces in Europe – Air Forces Africa	January – May 2012	Unknown.
323rd Air Expeditionary Wing		Romanian Air Force 71st Air Base	Romania	US Air Forces in Europe – Air Forces Africa	March – April 2008	Activated for the NATO 2008 Bucharest summit.
332nd Air Expeditionary Air Group		Unknown	Southwest Asia	US Air Forces Central	Unknown	Operated the MQ-9A Predator and F-15E Eagle in the Central Command area of responsibility, 2017. See 332d Expeditionary Operations Group.
363rd Air Expeditionary Wing		Prince Sultan Air Base	Saudi Arabia	US Central Command Air Forces	December 1998 – August 2003	Part of Operation Southern Watch which patrolled the Southern No-Fly Zone over Iraq below the 33rd Parallel
370th Air Expeditionary Wing		New Al Muthana Air Base	Iraq	US Air Forces Central	February 2010 – 2011	
370th Air Expeditionary Advisory Group		New Al Muthana Air Base	Iraq	US Air Forces Central	March 2007 – November 2008	Supported the restart of the Iraqi Air Force by training Iraqi personnel.
376th Air Expeditionary Wing		Transit Center at Manas	Kyrgyzstan	US Air Forces Central	December 2001 – June 2014	Operated the Transit Centre at Manas in support of Operation Enduring Freedom.
384th Air Expeditionary Wing		Isa Air Base	Bahrain	US Air Forces Central	September 2003 – 2004	Supported operations in the Middle East.
385th Air Expeditionary Group		Al-Udeid Air Base	Qatar	Air Mobility Command	June 2002-May 2022	Provided airlift and aerial refueling support in the US Central Command area of responsibility. Assigned to the 379th Air Expeditionary Wing and operated from Al-Udeid AB and Ali Al Salem AB in Kuwait.
398th Air Expeditionary Group		Budapest Ferihengy International Airport	Hungary	US Air Forces in Europe – Air Forces Africa	March – April 2008	Was assigned to 323rd Air Expeditionary Wing. Activated for the NATO 2008 Bucharest summit.
405th Air Expeditionary Wing		Bagram Air Base	Afghanistan	US Air Forces Central		
407th Air Expeditionary Group		Ahmad al-Jaber Air Base	Kuwait	US Air Forces Central	2016-June 2022	Provided airlift operations from Ahmad al-Jaber AB and Ali Al Salem AB in Kuwait for the US Central Command area of responsibility. Assigned to the 386th Air Expeditionary Wing.
409th Air Expeditionary Group		Nigerien Air Base 201	Niger	406th AEW	2011	Provides intelligence, surveillance, and reconnaissance to counter extremist activity.
410th Air Expeditionary Wing		Prince Hassan Air Base and Shahid Muafaq Al-Salti Air Base	Jordan	US Central Command Air Forces	2003–unknown	Supported Operation Iraqi Freedom.
416th Air Expeditionary Wing		Unknown	Unknown	Unknown	Unknown	Unknown
435th Air Expeditionary Wing		Ramstein Air Base	Germany	US Air Forces in Europe Air Forces Africa	2013–2023	Supported US Africa Command operations, with subordinate units forward deployed to locations throughout Africa. Mission and components taken over by the 406th Air Expeditionary Wing in 2023.
438th Air Expeditionary Wing		Hamid Karzai International Airport	Afghanistan	US Air Forces Central	2001–2021	Provided training, advice, and assistance to the Afghan Air Force. Also operated at Kandahar International Airport.
444th Air Expeditionary Wing		Unknown	Unknown	US Central Command Air Forces	2003–unknown	Supported Operation Iraqi Freedom.
447th Air Expeditionary Group		Incirlik Air Base	Turkey	US Air Forces Central	2015-December 2018	Flew Operation Inherent Resolve A-10C Thunderbolt II combat and KC-135R Stratotanker air refueling missions.
451st Air Expeditionary Group		Kandahar Airfield	Afghanistan	US Air Forces Central	2002–2021	Operated the A-10C Thunderbolt II, HH-60G Pave Hawk, E-11A BACN and MQ-9A Reaper in support of Operation Freedom's Sentinel and NATO's Operation Resolute Support. Assigned to the 455th Air Expeditionary Wing.
455th Air Expeditionary Wing		Bagram Air Field	Afghanistan	US Air Forces Central	2008–2021	Supported Operation Freedom's Sentinel and NATO's Operation Resolute Support.
457th Air Expeditionary Group		Morón Air Base	Spain	Air Mobility Command	2011	Supported Operation Odyssey Dawn and NATO's Operation Unified Protector in relation to the Libyan Civil War.
462nd Air Expeditionary Group		Diego Garcia Air Base	British Indian Ocean Territory	Pacific Air Forces	July 2002 – unknown	Operated KC-135R Stratotankers in support of Operation Enduring Freedom whilst assigned to the 40th Air Expeditionary Wing.
466th Air Expeditionary Group		Transit Center at Manas	Kyrgyzstan	US Air Forces Central	2012–2014	Supported operations at the Transit Centre at Manas in support of Operation Enduring Freedom.
467th Air Expeditionary Group		Camp Victory, Baghdad International Airport	Iraq	US Air Forces Central	2010–unknown	Supported Operation New Dawn in Iraq.
484th Air Expeditionary Wing		Al-Udeid Air Base	Qatar	US Air Forces Central	2003	Supported Operation Iraqi Freedom.
485th Air Expeditionary Wing		Tabuk Regional Airport	Saudi Arabia	US Air Forces Central	2003	Supported Operation Iraqi Freedom.
486th Air Expeditionary Wing		Ahmad al-Jaber Air Base	Kuwait	US Air Forces Central	2003	Supported Operation Iraqi Freedom.
487th Air Expeditionary Wing		Cairo West Airfield	Egypt	US Air Forces Central	2003	Supported Operation Iraqi Freedom.
492nd Air Expeditionary Group		Lajes Field	Azores	Air Mobility Command	2003	Supported Operation Iraqi Freedom.
506th Air Expeditionary Group		Kirkuk Air Base	Iraq	US Air Forces Central	Unknown–2010	
Personnel Recovery Task Force/563rd Air Expeditionary Group		Trapani Air Base	Italy	US Air Forces in Europe – Air Forces Africa	June 2013 – January 2014	Operated the HC-130J Combat King II. Drawn from elements of 563rd Rescue Group. Assigned to the 435th Air Expeditionary Wing.
651st Air Expeditionary Group		Camp Bastion	Afghanistan	US Air Forces Central	June 2011 – unknown	

Return to List of wings of the United States Air Force
