= United States intervention in Niger =

- Part of Jihadist insurgency in Niger, War in the Sahel, and the war on terror (Operation Juniper Shield)
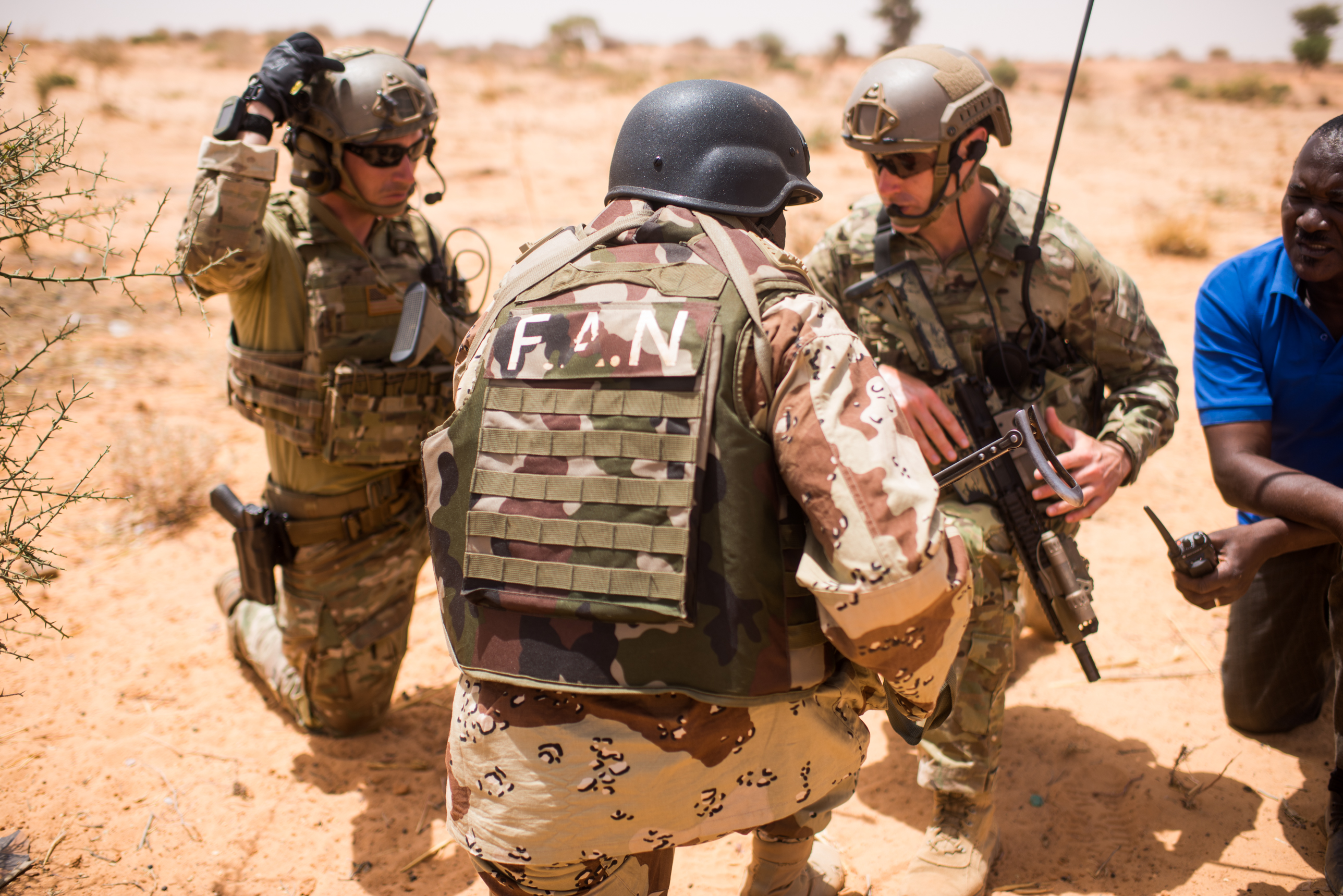
- U.S. and Nigerien soldiers training in April 2018
Date	5 February 2013 – 5 August 2024 (11 years and 6 months)
Location	Burkina Faso, Mali, Niger
Result	Failure of American forces in suppressing jihadists: Niger's junta ended a military agreement that allowed US troops to be deployed in the country; US lost access to Niger Air Base 201, largest drone base in Africa built by the United States for $110 million; Beginning of new military cooperation between Niger and Russia; Jihadi groups linked to Al-Qaeda, the Islamic State group and Boko Haram remained still active in Niger in 2024

Belligerents
United States: U.S. Armed Forces; In support of: Niger (until coup d'état); France; Operation Barkhane (2014–23); Training: European Union; EUCAP Sahel Niger (2012–24); Canada; Operation Naberius (2013–24); Belgium; Germany (2015–2024); Italy	Jihadists: Al-Qaeda: Nusrat al-Islam; ISIL: Islamic State – West Africa Province; Islamic State in the Greater Sahara; Boko Haram (partially aligned with ISIL since 2015)

Commanders and leaders
(United States) Joe Biden (2021–2024) (United States) Donald Trump (2017–2021) (United States) Barack Obama (2013–2017) (United States) Jim Mattis (United States) Thomas D. Waldhauser (United States) James C. Vechery (France) Emmanuel Macron (2017–2023) (France) François Hollande (2014–2017)	(al-Qaeda) Iyad Ag Ghali (Islamic State) Adnan Abu Walid al-Sahrawi † (Islamic State) Abubakar Shekau † (Islamic State) Abu Musab al-Barnawi (Islamic State) Doundou Chefou Abubakar Shekau † Abu Umaimata

Strength
1,000 personnel	ISIL-West Africa: ~3,500 fighters (April 2018); ISGS: ~300 fighters

Casualties and losses
(United States) 5 killed (1 non hostile); 4 injured (2 non hostile) (Niger) 5 killed, 8 wounded (While operating with the United States) (France) 1 killed (non hostile) (while operating with the United States)	32 militants killed in two separate attacks Unknown killed in other attacks between 2015 and 2017 Unknown killed by drone strikes in Southern Libya At least 1 weapons cache

From 2013 to 2017, the United States deployed special operations forces and unmanned aerial vehicles in Niger to support the Nigerien government and French military in counter-terrorism operations against militant groups as part of Operation Juniper Shield. The deployment of U.S. forces in Niger and in the greater West Africa region involved the training of host nation partner forces, enhancement of host nation security assistance efforts, and facilitated counter-terrorism and surveillance and reconnaissance missions in support of host nation partner forces. The U.S. deployed drones from the Air Force and CIA in order to assist American and Nigerien forces in counter-terrorism operations, monitor routes used by militants in Niger into neighboring nations, and to assist operations in Libya.

The deployment of US troops in Niger had been largely unreported until the 2017 Tongo Tongo ambush by Islamic State in the Greater Sahara militants left four American and four Nigerien soldiers dead. The ambush created controversy in the public and media with many people asking as to why the US had so many troops across Africa and specifically Niger which at the time had more than 800 US personnel in the country.

In July 2023, the Nigerien coup d'état occurred, leading to the Nigerien crisis.

In April 2024, the US Department of State agreed to pull out all 1,000 US troops from the country. The Pentagon confirmed that US troops would complete their withdrawal from Niger by mid-September 2024. The process was complete by 5 August 2024.

After 11 years of US military presence, Jihadi groups linked to Al-Qaeda, the Islamic State group and Boko Haram remained still active with numerous attacks and dozens killed in Niger in 2023 and 2024.

== Background ==
In the last several decades, the Sahel region of sub-Saharan Africa has been heavily affected by the rise of Islamic terrorist groups and militias as a result of the region's porous borders, weak central governments, ethnic factionalism, and more recently an influx of arms following the collapse of the Gaddafi regime in Libya. Groups such as al-Qaeda in the Islamic Maghreb, Islamic State in the Greater Sahara, and Movement for Oneness and Jihad in West Africa, among others have flourished in the region's sprawling and unpoliced deserts. Niger has been a particularly violent hotbed of Islamic extremism and anti-government attacks. Kidnappings of Westerners in the country date back to as early as 2009 and the execution of a French hostage, Michel Germaneau, in 2010 led to a French declaration of war on AQIM and a greater involvement of French military forces in Niger.

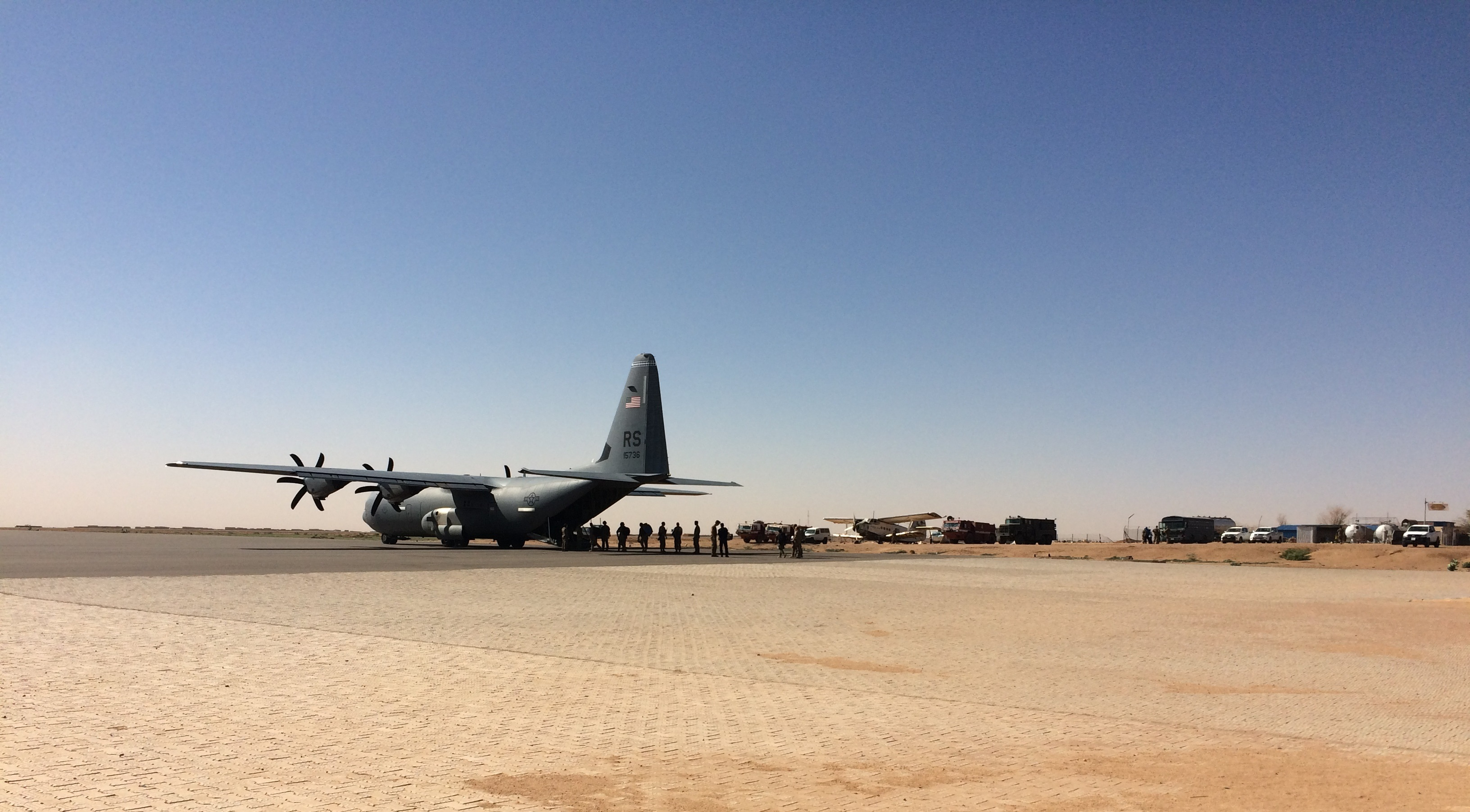
A Lockheed C-130 Hercules of the U.S. Air Force at Mano Dayak International Airport, Agadez

The United States had been providing security assistance to Niger following the September 11 attacks as part of the Pan-Sahel Initiative which included the allocation of equipment to security forces and periodic training of Nigerien forces by U.S. troops.

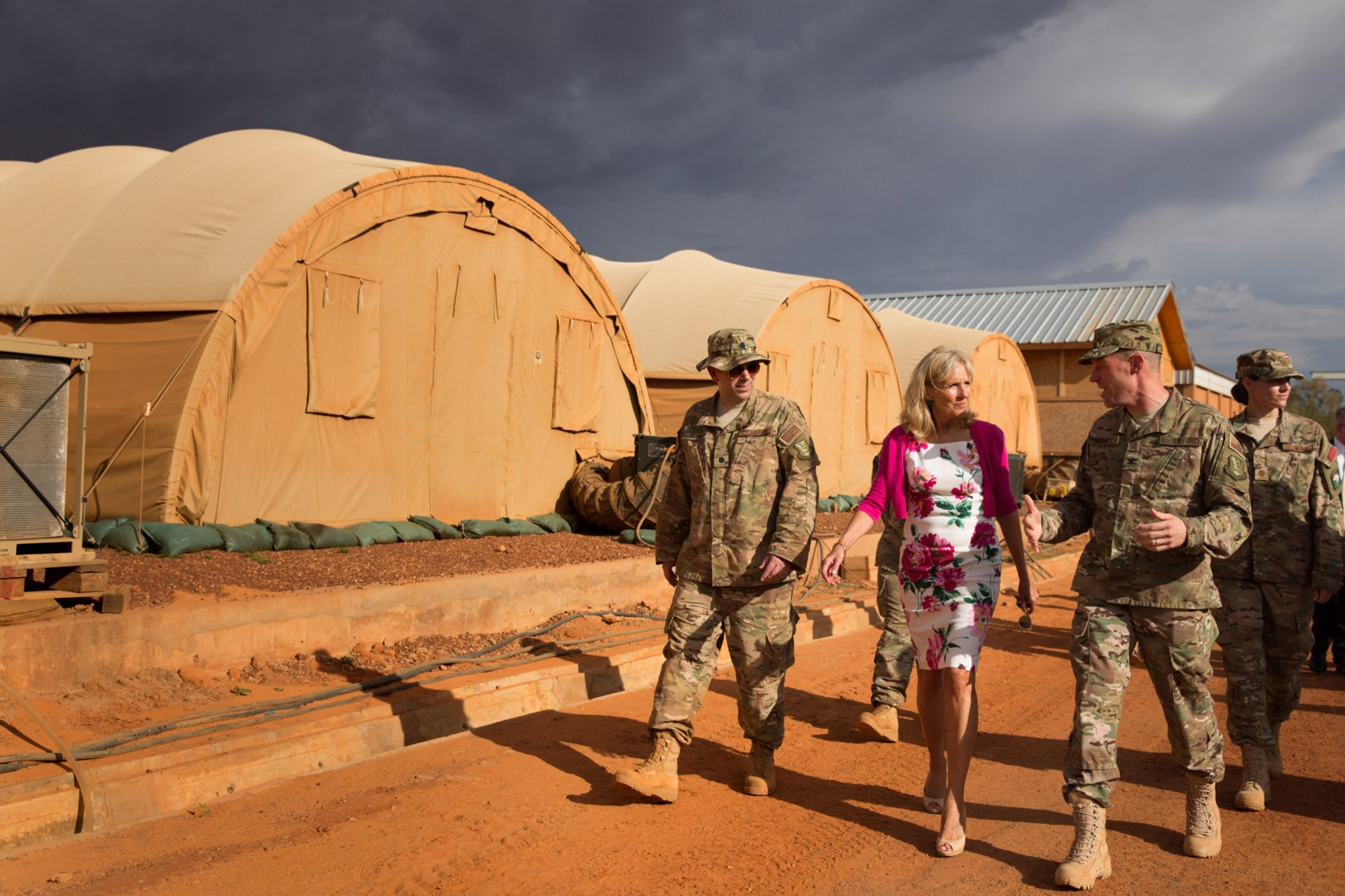
First lady of the United States Jill Biden tours the U.S. Exercise Relief Facility in Niger

In January 2013, the United States and Niger signed a status of forces agreement to allow U.S. troops and aircraft to operate in Niger in a non-combat capacity in order to support French counterterrorism efforts. Niger's president, Mahamadou Issoufou, welcomed the deployment citing various threats exploiting local government's inability to extend its control to rural areas. According to U.S. and Nigerien officials, the deployment of unarmed Predator drones was to provide surveillance capabilities over Mali and Niger. The following month, the Obama administration deployed a force of about 100 U.S. troops to Niger in order to facilitate the drone operation in Niamey and partner with French intelligence.

In 2018 the Trump Administration and the United States Africa Command laid out plans to withdraw around 25% of all US Military forces in Africa with around 10% withdrawing from West Africa so they could focus on threats from Russia and China while still remaining in the area.

== Attacks ==
Between 2015 and 2017, American personnel had been involved in at least 10 firefights while operating with partner Nigeriens. In these past firefights excluding the October 2017 ambush no American or Nigerien personnel were killed or wounded. In some of the attacks enemy combatants had been killed with at least 32 killed in the October and December 2017 incidents.

=== Tongo Tongo ambush ===
On October 4, 2017 a joint American and Nigerien force of 46 personnel and eight vehicles was ambushed outside the village of Tongo Tongo by an estimated force of over 50 militants with around 20 motorcycles and 12 technicals from the Islamic State in the Greater Sahara (ISGS). During the firefight which lasted for more than three hours, four American, four Nigerien and at least 21 ISGS militants died and eight Nigerien and two Americans including the teams commander were wounded. The battle came to an end after French Mirage 2000 fighter jets and helicopters carrying 53 special forces and three Nigerien response elements of at least 100 soldiers and a helicopter reached the village, however the fight was over as the enemy had departed the area.

=== December 2017 attack ===
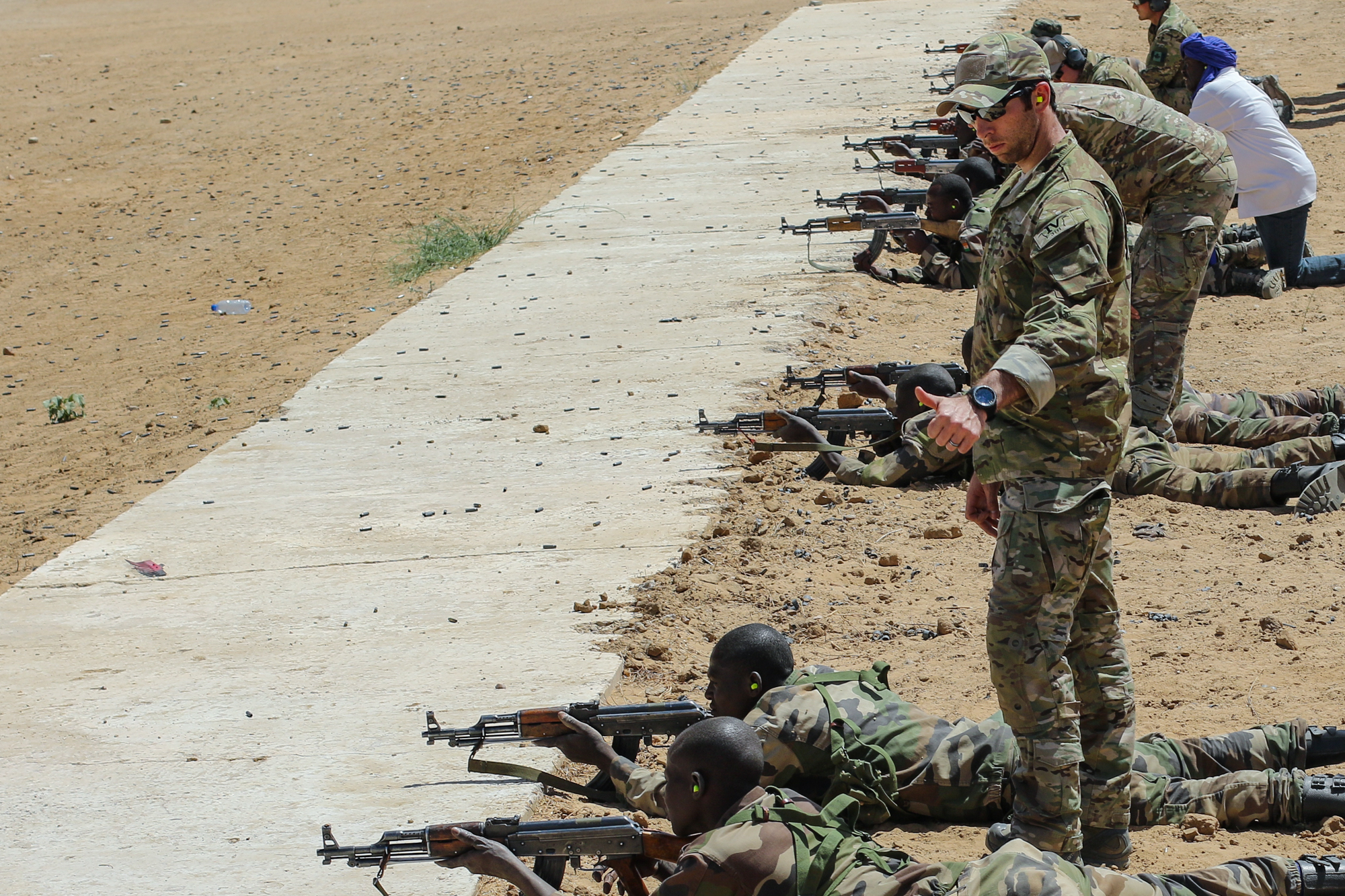
U.S. and Nigerien soldiers train together in Diffa

On December 6, 2017 two months after the October ambush a joint force of American Green Berets and Nigerien soldiers were attacked by Islamic State – West Africa Province militants in the Chad Lake basin Region. During the firefight 11 militants died including two wearing suicide vests, one weapons cache was also destroyed during the operation. No American or Nigerien soldiers were killed or wounded.

=== Other incidents ===
On February 2, 2017, U.S. commando Shawn Thomas was killed and another injured in a non-combat vehicle accident in Niger.

On December 9, 2018 a French soldier was killed and a US servicemember was injured in a car accident in northern Niger, near Arlit. Both the French and US military are probing the incident as drinking while driving related.

In October 2016, American humanitarian Jeffrey Woodke was kidnapped from his home by armed men. He is believed to be held by Jama'at Nasr al-Islam wal Muslimin (JMIN), and a ransom has been demanded. He was released in 2023

== Nigerien crisis ==
On 26 July 2023, the Presidential Guard of Niger detained President Mohamed Bazoum in a coup d'état, with presidential guard commander General Abdourahamane Tiani suspending the Nigerien constitution, and declaring himself to be the leader of a new military junta. This has sparked a military crisis between the Nigerian Junta and the combined militaries of the Economic Community of West African States, who are calling for a restoration of Bazoum's presidency.

=== French withdrawal ===
On August 23, 2023, the junta announced that it will evict French and US troops from Niger even though the United States was trying to find ways to keep troops in the country to counter terrorists.

In September 2023, French President Emmanuel Macron announced that France will withdraw all 1,500 troops from Niger by the end of 2023, in the aftermath of the coup in the country.

On December 22, 2023, France completed the withdrawal of its troops from Niger.

=== United States withdrawal ===
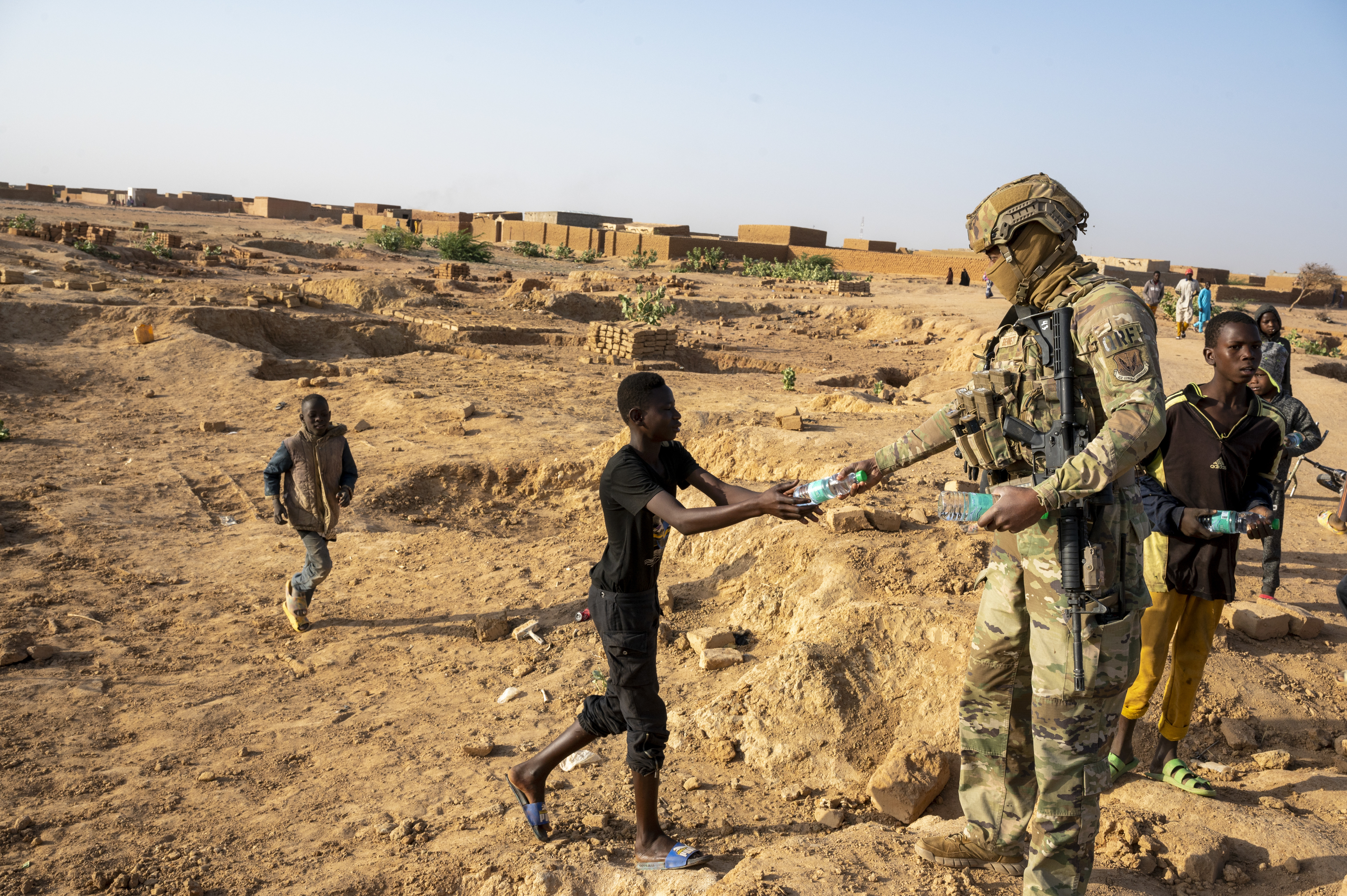
A U.S. Air Force member hands a bottle of water to a local child near Air Base 201

On October 26, 2023, the U.S. Senate rejected legislation that would have forced President Joe Biden to withdraw US troops from Niger.

In March 2024, Niger's ruling military council, known as the CNSP, declared the suspension of a military agreement with the United States. However, Pentagon officials stated that they have not yet formally received this request from Niger.

On April 12, dozens of Russian military instructors have arrived in Niger as part of a new agreement with the country's junta.

On April 19, the U.S. Department of State agreed to pull out all 1,000 US troops from the country. On May 15, US and Nigerien officials met in Niamey to discuss and coordinate the forces withdrawal. Pentagon confirmed that US troops will complete their withdrawal from Niger by mid-September 2024.

On July 7, U.S. completed withdrawal of all troops from Air Base 101, while 500 remaining troops left Air Base 201 on August 5, 2024.

== Drone base ==
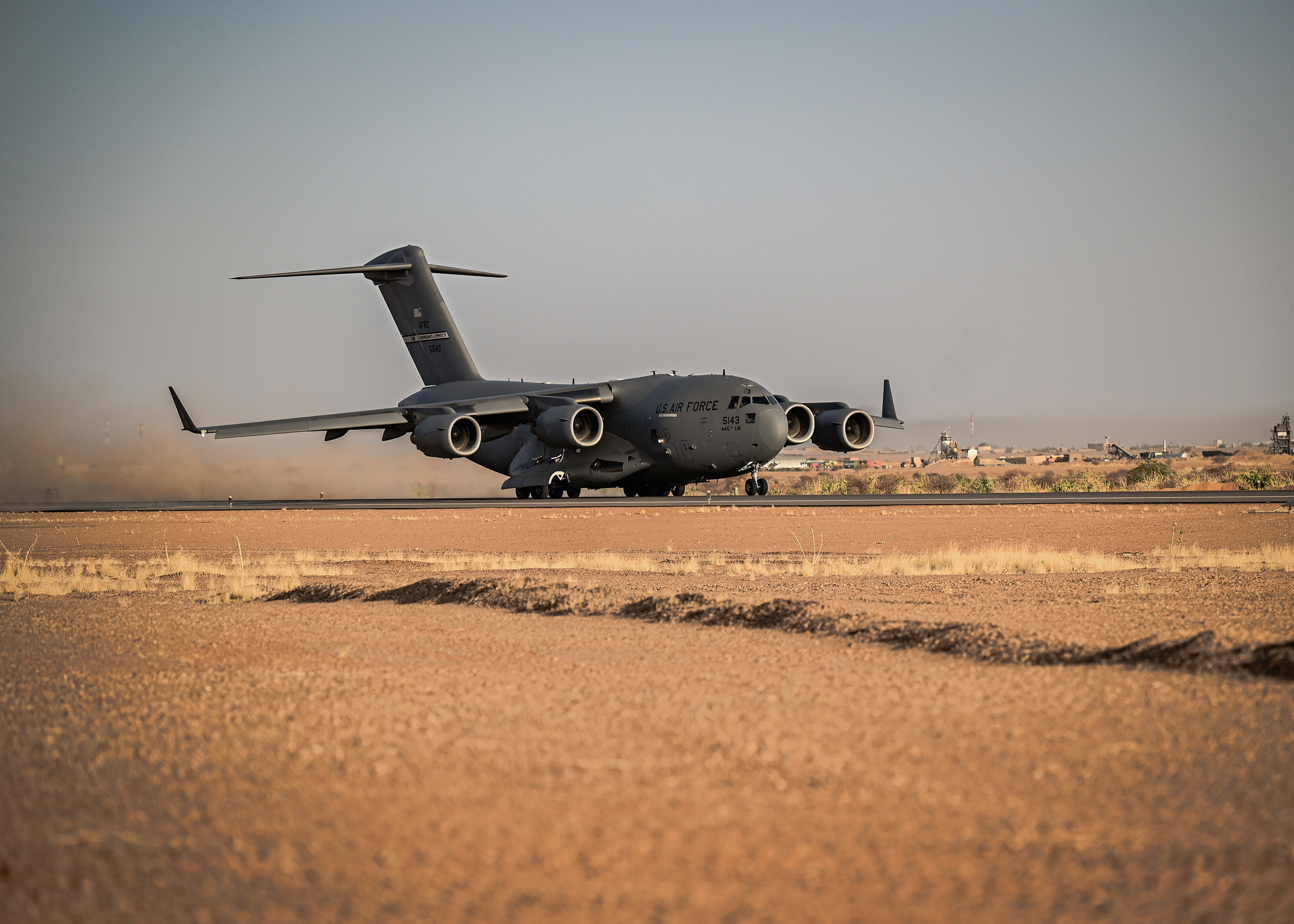
A U.S. Air Force C-17 Globemaster III taking off from the Air Base 201

The United States constructed Niger Air Base 201 in the city of Agadez after the Nigerien government granted approval for the base in 2014. After several years of construction, the base began operations in 2019 and has since become the central hub U.S. operations in Niger, shifting away from Niamey. The air base has a 6,800 foot runway and cost approximately $110 million to complete. The base allowed U.S. drones to fly missions over the region and maintained the ability to accommodate large transport aircraft such as the C-17 Globemaster.

== See also ==
- Jihadist insurgency in Niger
- American intervention in Libya (2015–2019)
- American military intervention in Somalia (2007–present)
- United States Africa Command
- List of wars involving the United States
