= Sabara =

Sabara may refer to:

== People ==
- Śabara, Indian philosopher
- Sabará (footballer), Onofre Anacleto de Souza (1931–1997), Brazilian midfielder
- Daryl Sabara (born 1992), American actor

== Places ==
- Sabará, a municipality in Brazil
- Sabara Bangou, a village in the north of the rural commune of Tondikiwindi (also Tondi Kiwindi), Ouallam Department, Tillabéri Region in southwestern Niger

== Plants ==
- Jabuticaba, the Brazilian grape tree, also known as "Sabará"
