= AETF =

AETF may refer to:

- Air and Space Expeditionary Task Force
- All-England Theatre Festival
- Alaska Electrical Trust Fund
- All European Taekwon-Do Federation
- Asia Endosurgery Task Force
