= 406th Air Expeditionary Wing =

406th Air Expeditionary Wing

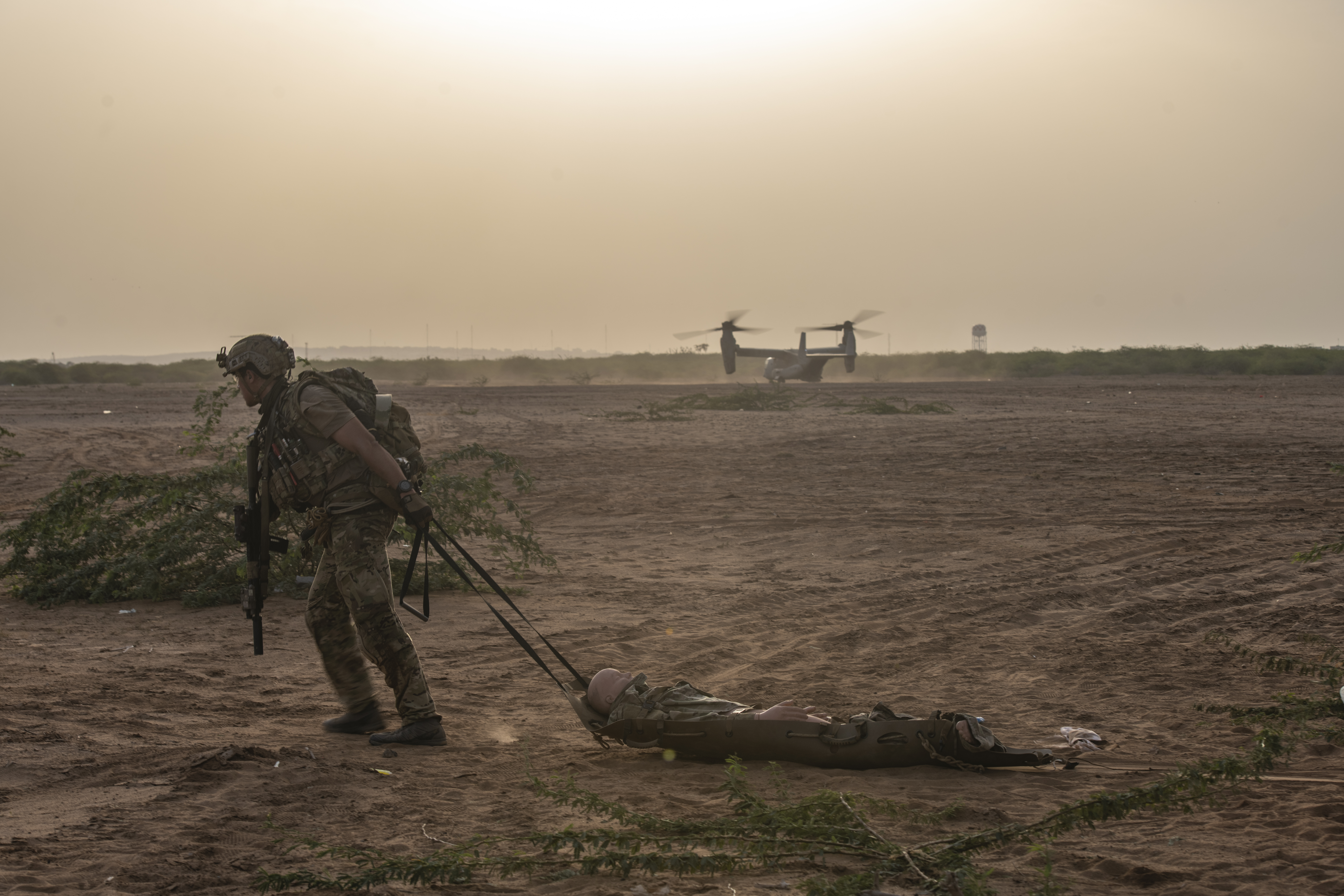
- A pararescueman from the wing's 82nd Expeditionary Rescue Squadron drags a litter during an exercise in Djibouti, 2023
- Active: 1952–1958; 1972–1992; 2011; 2023–present
- Country: United States
- Branch: United States Air Force
- Type: Air Expeditionary
- Part of: United States Air Forces in Europe – Air Forces Africa: Third Air Force
- Garrison/HQ: Ramstein Air Base, Germany
- Mottos: Ascende et Defende (Latin for 'Rise and Defend')
- Decorations: Air Force Outstanding Unit Award (6x)

Insignia
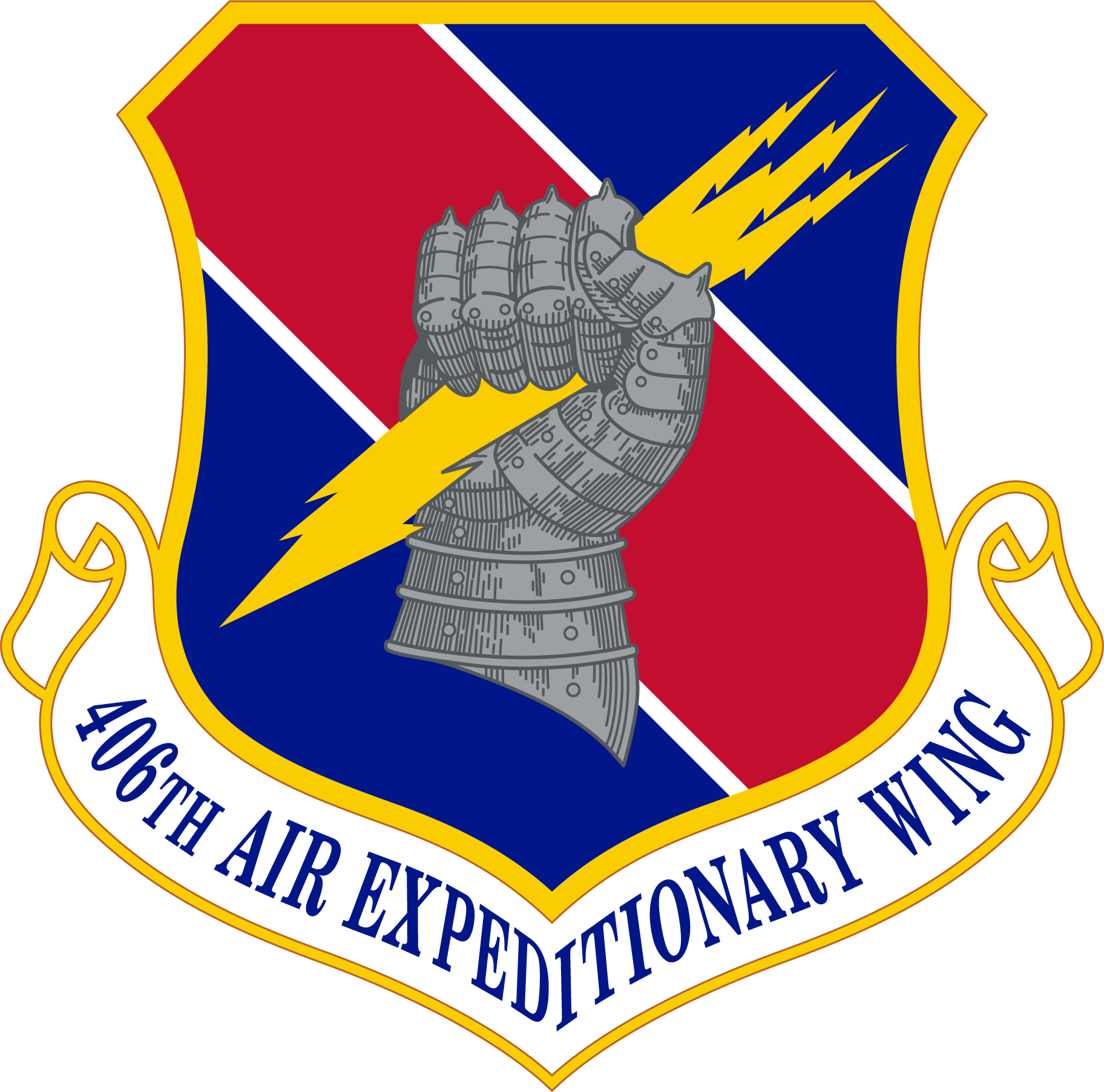
- 406th Air Expeditionary Wing emblem

The 406th Air Expeditionary Wing is a provisional air expeditionary unit assigned to the United States Air Force's Third Air Force, stationed at Ramstein Air Base, Germany. Its components conduct tactical airlift, personnel recovery, casualty evacuation, and attack missions in support of United States Africa Command.

The wing was first activated as a fighter-bomber unit during the early Cold War in 1952 and was stationed in the United Kingdom for six years until its inactivation in 1958. From 1972 to 1992, the wing served as a training unit while stationed in Spain.

In 2001, the wing was assigned to United States Air Forces in Europe as a provisional unit.

The unit was most recently activated on 9 June 2023, assuming control of the units of the 435th Air Expeditionary Wing.

== History ==
=== 406th Fighter-Bomber Wing ===
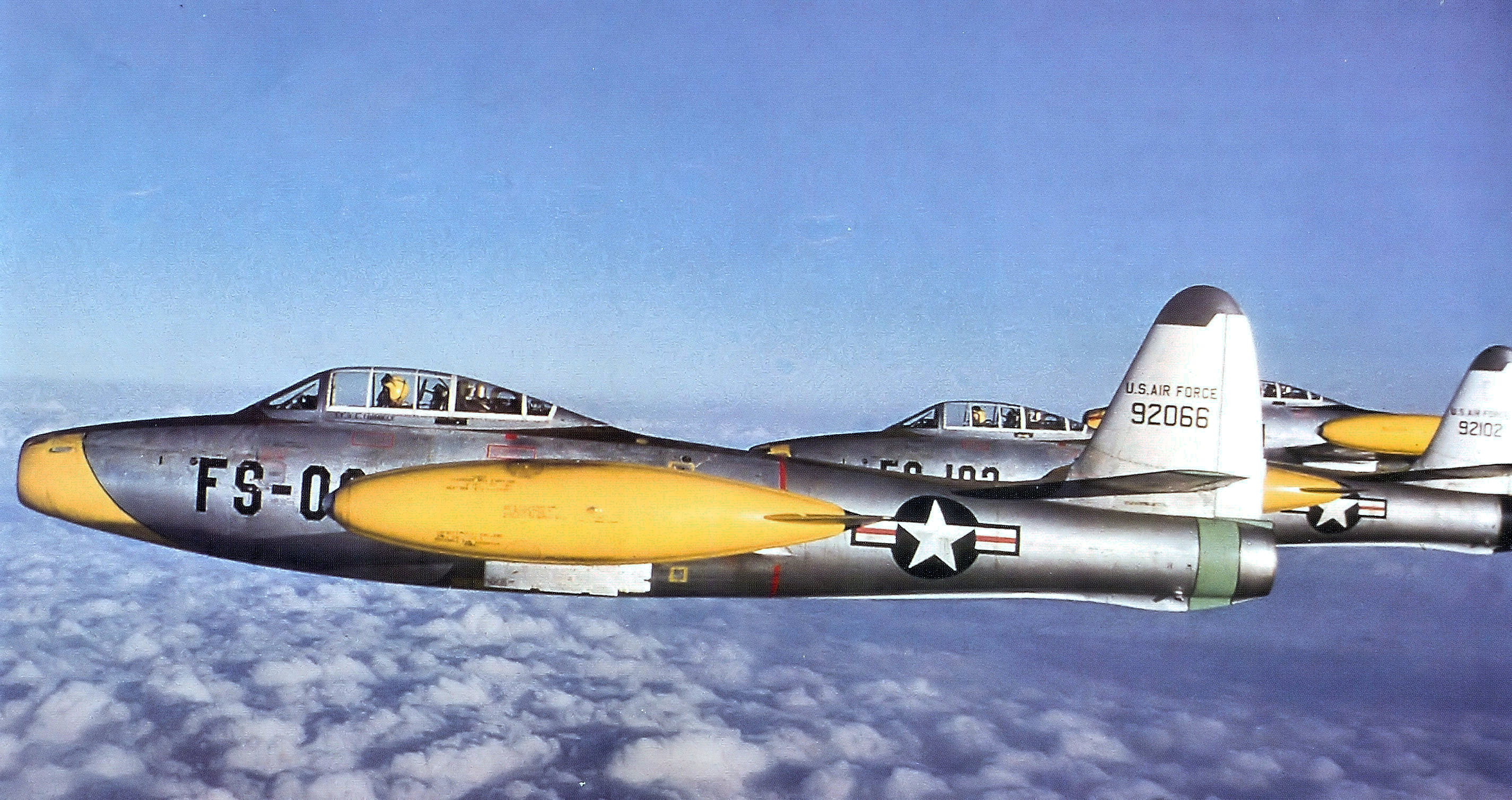
Republic F-84E-1-RE Thunderjets of the 512th Fighter-Bomber Squadron. Serial 49-2066 is in the foreground.

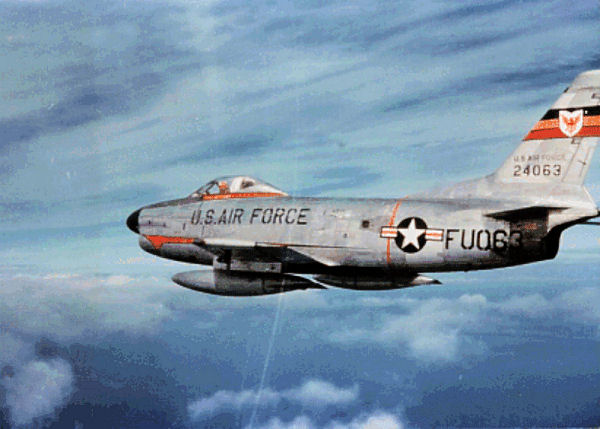
North American F-86D-45-NA Sabre Serial 52-4063 of the 513th Fighter Interceptor Squadron

On 10 July 1952, the 123d Fighter-Bomber Wing at RAF Manston, England was released from federal service and returned to the Kentucky Air National Guard, while its personnel and equipment were transferred to the newly activated 406th Fighter-Bomber Wing. The fighter squadrons were replaced by the 512th, 513th and 514th respectively, and the Republic F-84G Thunderjets and support aircraft of the ANG were assigned to the 406th Fighter-Bomber Group. The 406th FBW commanded the functions of both the support groups as well as the flying combat 406th FBG. The few National Guardsmen still with the wing departed and the last were released from active duty on 9 July, although a few reserve officers remained on active duty for an additional six to twelve months.

On 1 April 1954 the wing became a Fighter-Interceptor Wing. On 1 May 1956, it converted to the dual deputy organization, assigning operational squadrons directly to the wing. The 406th Fighter-Bomber Group was inactivated. In June 1956 North American F-86D Sabre interceptors arrived from CONUS to equip the 87th Fighter-Interceptor Squadron which was transferred to the 406th from the 81st FBW assigned to RAF Shepherds Grove. The 87th FIS, however, physically remained at Shepherds Grove, but was under the command of the 406th FIW at Manston. In September 1955, the 87th was redesignated the 512th FIS.

In May 1958, the 406th was inactivated. Its three air defense squadrons were reassigned to continental Europe under the 86th Air Division (Defense) at Ramstein Air Base West Germany. The squadrons were transferred to the following bases:

- 512th FIS to Sembach Air Base, West Germany
- 513th FIS to Phalsbourg-Bourscheid Air Base France
- 514th FIS to Ramstein Air Base, West Germany

The F-86D's were eventually withdrawn from Europe in 1961, and the 512th, 513th and 514th were inactivated.

=== 406th Tactical Fighter Training Wing ===
In February 1970 Project Creek Step called for the buildup of Zaragoza Air Base as a United States Air Forces in Europe (USAFE) weapons training site, with actual use of the Bardenas Reales Air-to-Ground Bombing and Gunnery Range (about 45 mi/70 km northwest of the base) began in March.

With the closure of Wheelus Air Base in Libya, Zaragoza returned to active status on 19 February 1970 with the activation of the 86th Air Division. The previous 406th FIW was redesignated the 406th Tactical Fighter Training Wing and activated on 21 July 1972. Although the 406th TFTW had no permanently assigned aircraft, the wing provided support to all USAFE tactical aircraft which used the Zaragoza range, as well as deployed SAC and TAC units, as well as allied NATO units.

Beginning in September 1972, the 406th also operated the USAFE Tactical Forces Employment School, and in May 1976, began operating the USAFE Instructor Pilot School. Weapons training detachments were principally F-4 Phantom II aircraft, although F-111s used the wing's ranges for a short period in 1974, and U.S. Navy A-7 Corsairs used the range facilities in June 1974. During November 1976, the 406th TFTW began full maintenance support of an SAC KC-135 tanker detachment on a permanent basis. On 12 September 1977, another facet was added to the wing's training operations when it conducted the first Dissimilar air combat training (DACT) missions with USAF and U.S. Navy aircraft

In 1979, the instructor pilot school was closed in July, due to broad changes in USAFE's mission and budget restraints. On 1 January 1980, the support mission expanded when the 406th assumed responsibility for various functional areas in support of the four USAF tropo-scatter radar sites at Humosa, Mencora, Soller, and Inoges. The wing provided this support in cooperation with the 401st Tactical Fighter Wing stationed at Torrejon Air Base.

Foremost among the accomplishments of the 406th TFTW during 1981 was the preparation and planning for reception of the F-16 Weapons Training Detachments which began in 1982. The 512nd TFS of the 86th Tactical Fighter Wing at Ramstein Air Base, West Germany recorded its first F-16C fighter deployment to the Bardenas Reales Range on 3 April 1986. This represented the initial use of the C-model F-16 aircraft at the range since the newer F-16s were introduced to the European theatre.

For the rest of the 1980s, the 406th continued to provide support for USAFE crew training and range training exercises. August 1990 ushered in a period of intense activity, as the 406th and Zaragoza provided major air and ground support for Operation Desert Shield, conducted in response to Iraq's invasion of Kuwait. Thousands of military personnel and tons of equipment passed through Zaragoza en route to the crisis in the Middle East. The base and the wing continued to act as a major aerial port providing support during and after Operation Desert Storm.

Subject to the same provisions requiring the removal of other units from Spain, the 406th began efforts to end its operations and return Zaragoza to the Spanish Government in 1992. The use of the training range ended in December 1991, followed by the turnover of base operations to the Spanish in April 1992.

The 406th Tactical Fighter Training Wing was inactivated on 1 April 1994 when USAFE ended its presence and returned control of Zaragoza Air Base to the Spanish government.

=== 406th Air Expeditionary Wing ===
In 2001, the wing was converted to provisional status as the 406th Air Expeditionary Wing. In this capacity, the wing was activated in early 2003 as a provisional wing to be used as part of Operation Iraqi Freedom (OIF), based in Turkey. When Turkey refused to allow its territory to be used as part of the March 2003 invasion of Iraq, it seems likely the 406 AEW was inactivated shortly afterward.

It was activated on 30 March 2011 at Moron Air Base, Spain to support Operation Odyssey Dawn, a mission to enforce a no-fly zone put in place to protect civilians in Libya during the escalating Libyan Civil War. The task of assembling an aerial refueling force initially fell to the 171st Air Refueling Wing of the Pennsylvania Air National Guard and Brigadier General Roy E. Uptegraff III, starting with two tankers that were already at Moron to support planes rotating to and from the Middle East. The first four tankers of the 171st arrived on the morning of 20 March. By the following day, the yet-to-be formally designated wing had grown to a mix of fifteen Boeing KC-135 Stratotankers and four McDonnell Douglas KC-10 Extenders, drawn from 14 different wings of the regular force, Air Force Reserve Command, and the Air National Guard. Looking at the mix of tail stripes on the planes he commanded, Brig. Gen. Uptegraff dubbed his unit the "Calico Wing."

Because Congress had not approved the mission, much of the wing's manning was on a volunteer bases, with funding drawn from money budgeted for other purposes. While operational control of the wing was assigned to USAFE's Seventeenth Air Force, deficiencies in manning and experience with air mobility operations led to a combined control between USAFE (for tactical control) and Air Mobility Command (AMC). On 31 March, control of Odyssey Dawn was assumed by NATO, which named it Operation Unified Protector. On the same day, the confused command situation was emphasised when simultaneous orders from USAFE and AMC designated Uptegraff's wing both the 406th AEW (USAFE), and the 313th Air Expeditionary Wing. Later accounts emphasize that Uptegraff focused on making sure operations continued, and that the 406th AEW only existed briefly. It is not made clear when the 406 AEW was formally disestablished. In contrast, the 313 AEW existed through October 2011.

On 9 June 2023, the unit was activated during a ceremony at Ramstein Air Base, it gained the components of the 435th Air Expeditionary Wing, which was inactivated the same day. Made up of two groups, which in turn consist of a total of 10 squadrons, the unit is the only air wing under the control of United States Africa Command. Operating from four airfields, the wing's mission consists of tactical airlift, personnel recovery, casualty evacuation, and attack operations.

== Lineage ==
- Established as 406th Fighter-Bomber Wing on 25 June 1952

Activated on 10 July 1952
Redesignated 406th Fighter-Interceptor Wing on 1 April 1954
Inactivated on 15 May 1958

- Redesignated 406th Tactical Fighter Training Wing on 20 June 1972

Activated on 15 July 1972
Inactivated on 31 October 1992

- Redesignated 406th Air Expeditionary Wing, and converted to provisional status, on 5 February 2001

Activated on 30 March 2011
Inactivated only "after a brief period".

- Activated on 9 June 2023

=== Assignments ===
- Third Air Force, 10 July 1952 – 15 May 1958
- Sixteenth Air Force, 15 July 1972 – 31 October 1992
- United States Air Forces in Europe to activate or inactivate at any time after 5 February 2001
- Third Air Force, 9 June 2023 – present

=== Components ===
Groups

- 406th Fighter-Bomber (later Fighter-Interceptor) Group, 10 July 1952 – 1 May 1956
- 409th Air Expeditionary Group, 9 June 2023 – present
- 449th Air Expeditionary Group, 9 June 2023 – present

Squadrons

- 87th Fighter-Bomber Squadron, attached 21 December 1954 – 8 September 1955
- 512th Fighter-Interceptor Squadron, 1 May 1956 – 24 March 1958
- 513th Fighter-Interceptor Squadron, 1 May 1956 – 25 April 1958
- 514th Fighter-Interceptor Squadron, 1 May 1956 – 15 May 1958

=== Stations ===
- RAF Manston, England, 10 July 1952 – 15 May 1958
- Zaragoza Air Base, Spain, 15 July 1972 – 31 October 1992
- Ramstein Air Base, Germany, 9 June 2023 – present
