= Tongo Tongo ambush =

2017 Islamic State operation

- Part of the Islamist insurgency in Niger, United States intervention in Niger, and Operation Barkhane
- The ambush captured by Jeremiah Johnson's helmet camera
Date	4 October 2017; 11:40 to 14:58 (local time)
Location	Tongo Tongo, Tillabéri Region, Niger 15°3′11.56″N 1°50′7.85″E
Result	Islamic State victory: US congressional inquiry and Department of Defense investigation; Green Beret senior officers and team leaders disciplined for the outcome of the ambush

Belligerents
Niger; United States; France	Islamic State

Commanders and leaders
Marcus Hicks; Michael Perozeni (WIA); Brent Bartels (WIA)	Adnan Abu Walid al-Sahrawi; Doundou Chefou; Tinka ag Almouner †; Al Mahmoud ag Baye †; Abu Huzeifa

Units involved
Niger Armed Forces; Security and Intelligence Battalion; 433rd Special Interdiction Company; United States Armed Forces; 3rd Special Forces Group; Operational Detachment Alpha (ODA) 3212; France Armed Forces; French Air and Space Force; Chimère special operations team, 1er RPIMa	Islamic State in the Greater Sahara

Strength
35 soldiers, 5 vehicles; 10 Green Berets, 1 intelligence contractor 2 technicals, 1 unarmed Toyota Land Cruiser; Reinforcements: 53 commandos, 2 Dassault Mirage 2000 fighter jets; 2 Tiger attack helicopters; 2 Super Puma helicopters; 15 aircraft total; (Niger) 3 ground Quick Reaction Force elements of at least 100 soldiers, 1 helicopter; (United States) 2 unmanned aerial vehicles	100+ militants, ~12 technicals, ~20 motorcycles

Casualties and losses
4 soldiers killed, 1 interpreter killed, 8 wounded 4 Green Berets killed, 2 wounded	At least 21 killed
- Location within Niger

The Tongo Tongo ambush or the Niger ambush occurred on 4 October 2017, when armed militants from the Islamic State in the Greater Sahara (ISGS) attacked Nigerien and US soldiers outside the village of Tongo Tongo, Niger, while they were returning to base after a stop in the village. During the ambush, four Nigeriens, four US soldiers, and at least 21 ISGS militants were killed, and eight Nigeriens and two US soldiers (including the team commander) were wounded. In the day preceding the ambush, the Nigerien and US soldiers conducted a mission attempting to locate and capture or kill Doundou Chefou, a commander in the ISGS.

The ambush sparked political debate over the presence of US forces in Africa and brought attention to previously under-reported US military activities in the region. The ambush also prompted congressional inquiries, and an investigation by the US Department of Defense (DoD). The DoD inquiry, completed in 2018, found that the 11-member US special forces team was not prepared for the mission, and identified other flaws in planning.

The ambush remains the largest loss of American lives in combat in Africa since the Battle of Mogadishu in 1993.

== Background ==
In January 2013, a senior Nigerien official told Reuters that Bisa Williams, the then-United States Ambassador to Niger, requested permission to establish a drone base in a meeting with Nigerien President Mahamadou Issoufou. On 5 February, officials from both Niger and the United States said that the two countries signed a status of forces agreement that allowed the deployment of unarmed surveillance drones. In that month, US President Barack Obama sent 150 military personnel to Niger to set up a surveillance drone operation that would aid France in its counterterrorism efforts in the Northern Mali conflict. In October 2015, Niger and the US signed a military agreement committing the two countries "to work together in the fight against terrorism". US Army Special Forces personnel (commonly referred to as Green Berets) have deployed on numerous occasions to train personnel of the Niger Armed Forces (FAN) to assist in the fight against terrorists from neighboring countries. In October 2017, there were about 800 US military personnel in Niger, most of whom were working to build a second drone base for US and French aircraft in Agadez. The expectations were that construction of the base would be completed in 2018, which would allow the US to conduct surveillance operations with the General Atomics MQ-9 Reaper to monitor ISIL insurgents flowing south and other extremists flowing north from the Sahel region.

In 2015, the Islamic State in the Greater Sahara was established by Adnan Abu Walid al-Sahrawi, who was a spokesperson and senior leader of the Movement for Oneness and Jihad in West Africa (MUJAO), a splinter group of al-Qaeda in the Islamic Maghreb. In August 2013, MUJAO merged with al-Mourabitoun, which swore allegiance to al-Qaeda emir Ayman al-Zawahiri. In May 2015, Sahrawi spoke on the behalf of al-Mourabitoun and had pledged his allegiance to the Islamic State of Iraq and the Levant and its leader, Abu Bakr al-Baghdadi. However, the declaration was not recognized by the group's leader, Mokhtar Belmokhtar, and the al-Qaeda loyalists, creating a split in the group. According to the United States Department of Defense, ISIL leaders in Syria had acknowledged Sahrawi's allegiance through their Amaq News Agency but ISGS "has not been formally recognized as an official branch of ISIL". The ISGS's first confirmed terror attack occurred on 2 September 2016 when fighters targeted a customs post in Markoye, Burkina Faso, an attack that left a border agent and a civilian dead. The ISGS had since been targeting pro-government militias that support the French and United Nations forces in Burkina Faso, Mali, and Niger.

According to the United Nations Office for the Coordination of Humanitarian Affairs (OCHA), at least 46 attacks occurred since early 2016 in the Tahoua and Tillabéri regions of Niger. OCHA also said that seven districts in the two regions had been under a state of emergency since March 2017, and the government renewed the measure for an additional three months on 18 September. The FAN had launched a military operation to reestablish security in Tillabéri in June 2017.

== Pre-ambush ==
=== First mission ===
On 2 October 2017, a US special forces (SOF) team from 3rd Special Forces Group based in Quallam received intelligence that placed a high value ISGS sub-commander in their area of responsibility. Following this intelligence, the team submitted a mission plan for the vicinity of Tiloa the next day. The plan the team submitted did not accurately describe the mission's intention, describing it as civil/military reconnaissance instead of the actual purpose which was to locate and capture or if necessary kill the ISGS sub-commander. The mission plan was assessed and approved by the AOB Niger and SOCCE commanders and on 3 October at 5:59 am (local time), the team of 11 personnel consisting of eight US Special Forces operators, two support, and an intelligence contractor accompanying 35 Nigerien personnel from the Security and Intelligence Battalion (Bataillon Sécurité et de Renseignement or BSR) and the 433rd Special Interdiction unit, departed toward the vicinity of Tiloa in an eight vehicle convoy. The Americans traveled in two technicals and an unarmored Toyota Land Cruiser while the Nigeriens traveled in five vehicles, one of which had been provided by the Central Intelligence Agency and had specialized surveillance equipment on board.

=== Second mission ===
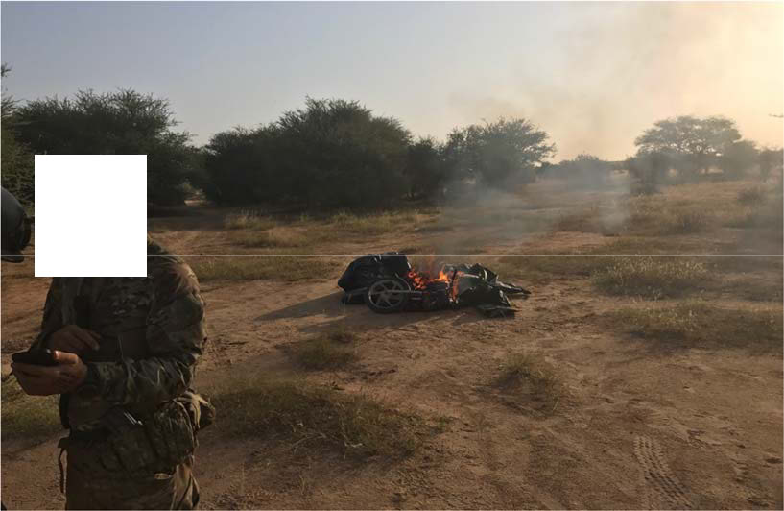
The burning motorcycle in "objective north"

In Tiloa, the team failed to locate the ISGS commander and began their return to base. More than halfway back to base, the team received time sensitive intelligence that placed the commander northwest of Tiloa at the Mali border. The approved mission plan originally called for a helicopter team as the primary force with the Quallam team serving as a quick reaction force, however bad weather forced the helicopter team to cancel, forcing team Quallam to continue on their own. Through the night of the 4th, the team made their movement north and reached the objective officials referred to as "objective north" at sunrise. As the team searched they discovered enemy rations, uniforms and a motorcycle all of which were destroyed by partner Nigerien soldiers. After completion of the second mission the team was ordered to return to base. Before returning the team commander ordered an overhead ISR asset to continue monitoring the area in order to gather intelligence on possible enemy routes leading into Mali. This left the team unwatched as they departed toward Tongo Tongo at 8:30 am (local time).

=== Stop at Tongo Tongo ===
In a video recorded before the ambush, young men can be seen on motorbikes armed with rifles and machine guns, repeating Islamist slogans, and discussing what they would do in the event they captured soldiers, with one of them saying that they would decapitate them.

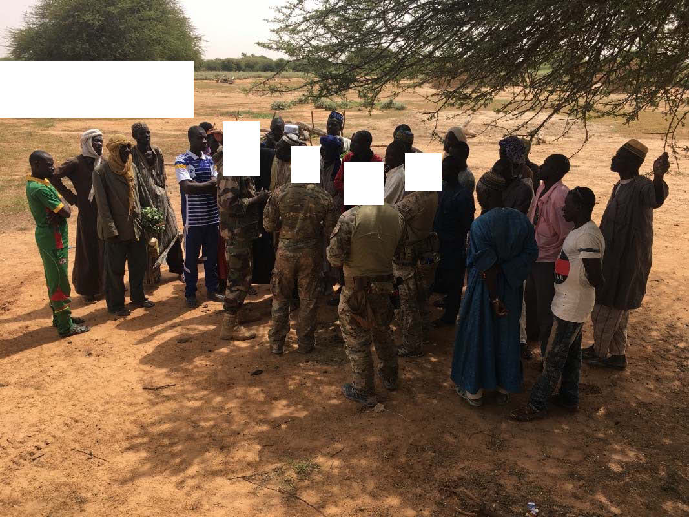
US forces with the Tongo Tongo elder and other villagers

At 10:30 am (local time), 4 October, the convoy stopped at the village of Tongo Tongo so that partner Nigeriens could eat breakfast and get water. During this, team members met with local leaders and 27 men of the village. The US and Nigerien team leaders objected to the task because they were not heavily armed or equipped for intense combat should they encounter Chefou's ISGS fighters alone, but the team leaders' concerns were overruled by a higher command. The US soldiers were divided in two groups: one that would stay back and guard the vehicles and another that would attend the meeting. However, the meeting would drag on with the local leaders delaying the soldiers' departure by stalling and keeping them waiting. The group guarding the vehicles began to suspect that something was wrong when they witnessed two motorcycles race out of the village. The team believed the local leader was complicit in an impending attack. After completion of the meeting, the soldiers walked back to the rest of the unit and their unarmored pickup trucks. The meeting lasted 30 minutes longer than the team leader expected.

== Ambush ==
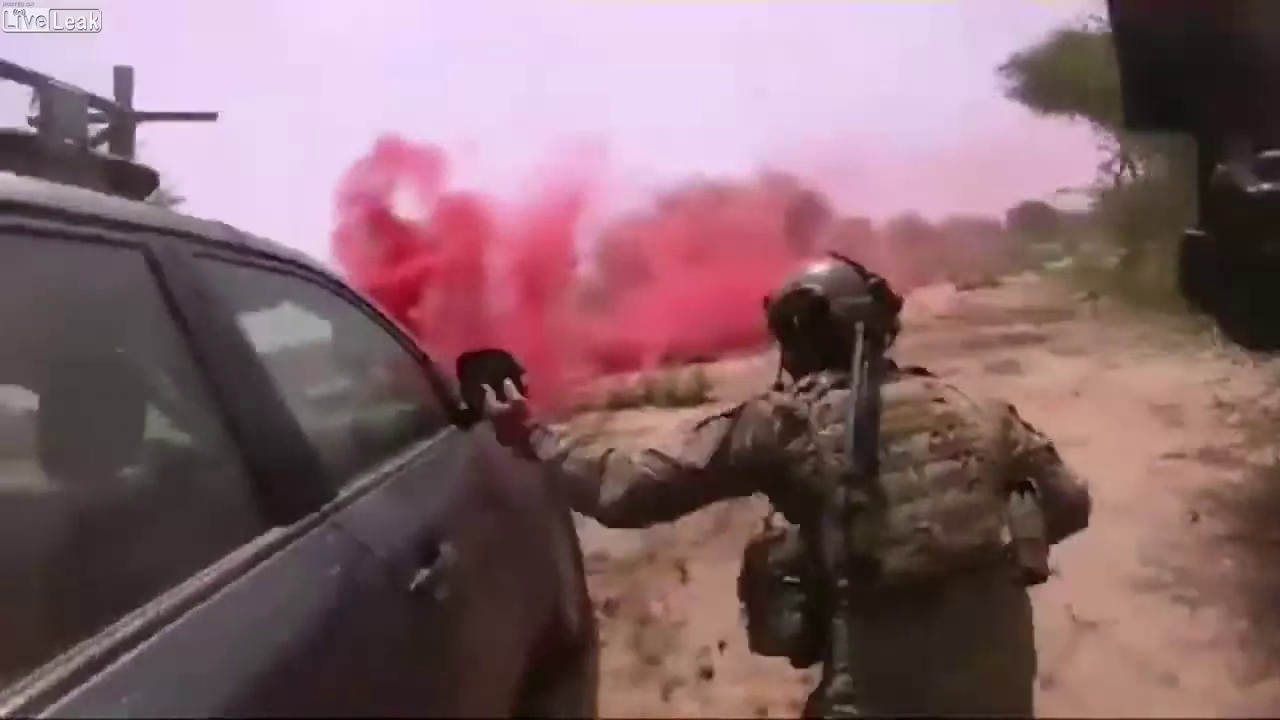
Bryan Black and Jeremiah Johnson alongside their unarmored SUV

The eight vehicle convoy left the village at 11:35 a.m. on their planned route back to base. Approximately 100 meters (110 yd) outside of the village, armed ISGS militants believed to be led by Doundou Chefou, a lieutenant in the terrorist group given the code name "Naylor Road" by US forces, began their assault against the rear of the convoy. The militants, who had arrived with a dozen technicals and about 20 motorcycles and were equipped with small arms, vehicle mounted heavy machine guns, rocket propelled grenades, and mortars had allowed the convoy to move through the kill zone before attacking, trapping the rear of the convoy.

Official Department of Defense briefing video

As the enemy force mounted and advanced through the tree line, the convoy halted. The team reported enemy contact and immediately returned fire using vehicle mounted M240 machine guns while the rest of the team dismounted from their vehicles, donned protective equipment, and began to exchange small arms fire. The team leader and four Nigerien soldiers moved to the southeast to flank what was thought to be a small enemy force; meanwhile the team sergeant ordered the rear US vehicle to the middle of the convoy to better coordinate machine gun fire with US vehicle one.

It was during this time that the rear Nigerien vehicle departed the area by an unknown route. The team leader and the four Nigerien soldiers continued their flanking movement until they were stopped by a body of water, at which point they identified and engaged the enemy across the water, killing approximately four combatants. The team leader observed a larger enemy force moving from his east consisting of armed men on motorcycles and vehicles with mounted machine guns. The team leader returned to the halted convoy at 11:57 a.m. and ordered the convoy to head south to prevent getting outflanked. Members of team Quallem killed several enemies during this movement out of the ambush site. Niger vehicles one and two were the first vehicles to depart. A team member threw a smoke grenade to conceal the team's movement south to regroup with the Nigeriens. Team members last saw Staff Sergeants Bryan Black, Jeremiah Johnson, and Dustin Wright taking cover behind the team's unarmored SUV.

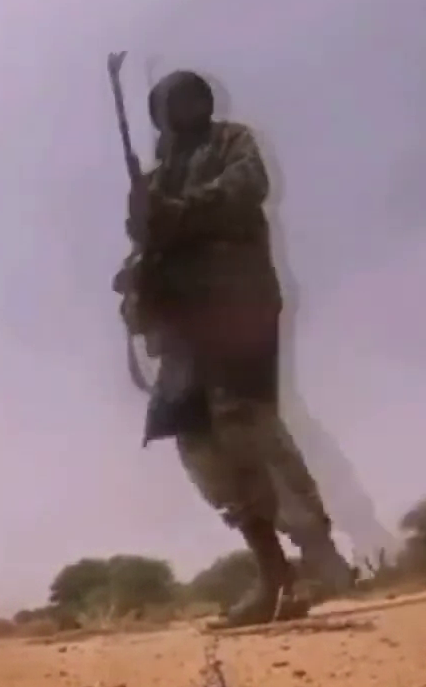
Islamic State fighter during the ambush, filmed by Jeremiah Johnson's helmet camera

Wright got in the SUV and began to slowly drive south while Black and Jeremiah Johnson ran alongside, continuing suppressive fire at the enemy while under heavy fire. After passing the colored smoke, Black ran and took cover behind a nearby tree while Jeremiah Johnson fired over the hood of the vehicle towards the tree line. As they continued their movement towards the south under fire, Jeremiah Johnson fell to the ground, leaving him exposed to enemy fire. Wright immediately backed up the SUV to bring him into cover. Simultaneously, Black was slightly ahead of the SUV and was hit by small arms fire, killing him instantly. Jeremiah Johnson regained his footing and ran to Black, checking for wounds. Wright exited the halted vehicle, looked toward the enemy and then dragged Black into cover. The two remained with Black's body and further assessed his wounds.

Eventually, as enemy combatants pushed forward, they hastily abandoned their position. Approximately 85 meters (93 yd) southwest of the SUV, Jeremiah Johnson was hit by enemy fire and collapsed; Wright stopped running and returned to Jeremiah Johnson's position. Wright continued to engage the enemy until incapacitated by enemy fire. Wright and Jeremiah Johnson were shot multiple times at close range by the militants, killing them.

After initially escaping the ambush site, the American and Nigerien forces established a secondary position. Upon realizing Black, Jeremiah Johnson, and Wright were missing, Two team members volunteered to head back to the ambush site in an attempt to locate vehicle there. As they advanced toward the ambush site they engaged and killed several militants before retreating to a safe position due to overwhelming fire. At this point two additional team members would head back toward the initial ambush site to help locate the missing teammates.

At the secondary position the remaining team members and partner forces were becoming overwhelmed by enemy fire and were forced to enter their vehicles and egress out of the area at a high speed. During this manoeuvre, Sergeant La David Johnson and two Nigerien soldiers became separated from the rest of his team. Believing he had successfully reentered his vehicle, the other vehicles had left the area. La David Johnson was unable to enter his vehicle due to concentrated enemy fire and was forced to escape and evade on foot with the two Nigeriens. Both Nigerien soldiers were killed by enemy fire as La David continued sprinting through the open desert. Approximately 960 meters (1,050 yd) from the initial ambush site, La David took cover under a dense thorny tree and engaged the encroaching enemy. Soon after, a vehicle with a mounted machine gun stopped within 100 meters (110 yd) of La David Johnson's position and pinned him down. La David Johnson was killed by small arms between 12:30 and 12:45 pm. Initial reports indicated that La David Johnson may have been captured and executed, but he was found laying on his back with his arms by his sides and had wounds consistent with sporadic fire while he actively engaged the enemy.

As the main Operational Detachment Alpha (ODA) element attempted to evade enemy forces, they came under heavy fire which resulted in one Nigerien soldier killed while the team leader and team sergeant would suffer multiple gunshot wounds. During this sustained attack the ODA leader was thrown from the bed of the team's pickup. The team circled the area and recovered the injured team leader.

At this point the team's vehicle became bogged down and unable to continue. The four team members who split from the second position would regroup with the remainder of the team and partner force. Under heavy fire, seven American and four Nigerian soldiers would run through the wooded area and break contact with the enemy. They would establish a perimeter and began treating the wounded. The team radioed in that they were being overrun, then destroyed their radios to avoid them getting in the hands of the enemy. They sent final messages to loved ones on personal devices and prepared for the worst. Team members would observe Nigerien soldiers on the ground praying.

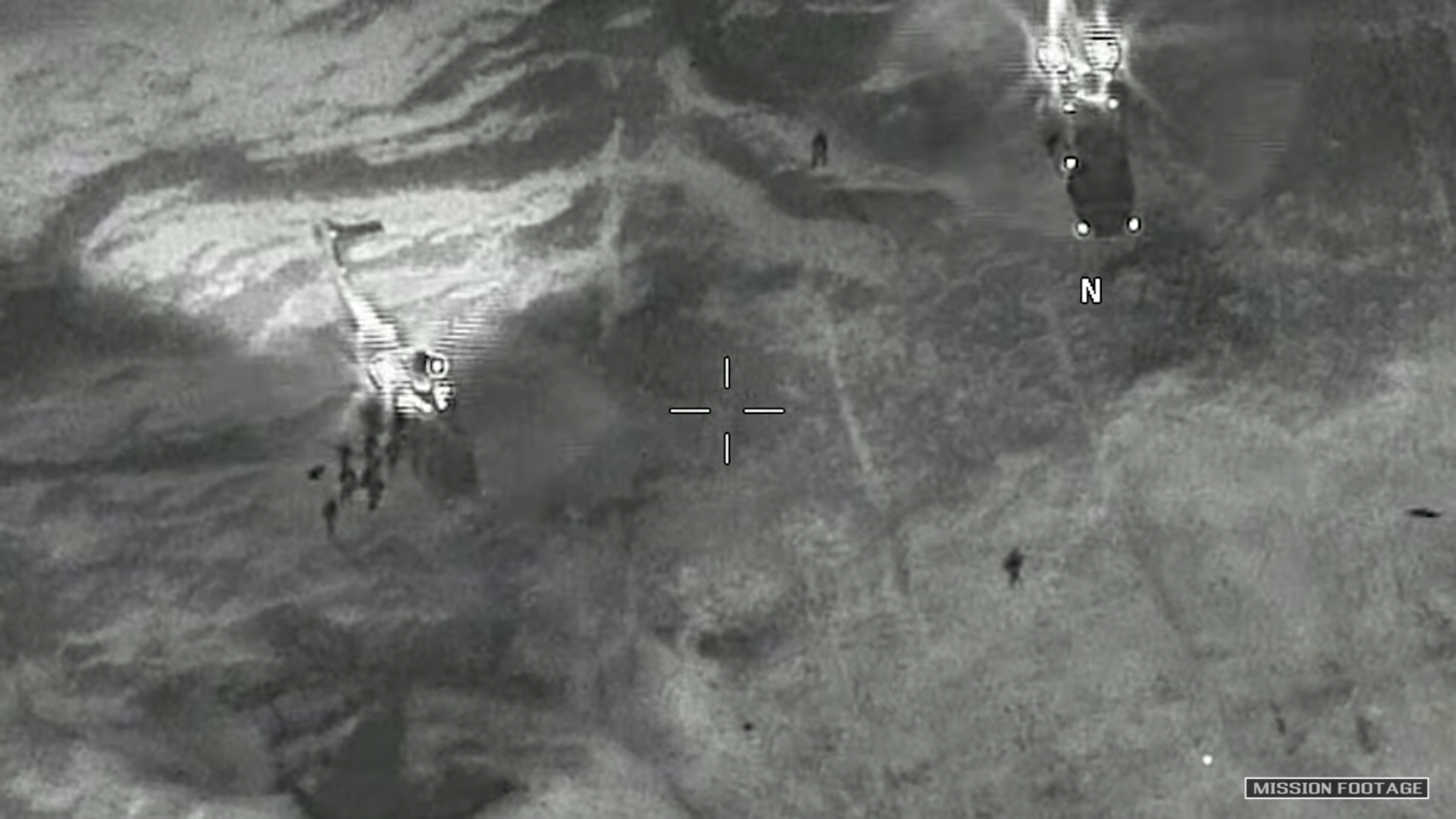
French commandos and Nigeriens secure the helicopter landing site

The first call for additional support was relayed by the US forces nearly an hour after they first came under fire. Within minutes, an unarmed US drone captured video of the firefight. French Mirage jets were ordered to respond to the ambush, and they arrived roughly thirty minutes after notification. Even though there was now air support, the French pilots could not engage because they could not readily identify enemy forces in the firefight. Nevertheless, the presence of the fighter jets brought the engagement to an end. Two French Super Puma helicopters were brought in from Mali to evacuate the injured Nigeriens and Americans, while Berry Aviation, an independent contractor, evacuated the bodies of the fallen US soldiers. Within three to four hours after the soldiers called in for support, a French special operations team arrived at the scene.

=== Post-ambush ===
When the soldiers were found, one US soldier was found lying next to an enemy pickup truck while two other US soldiers were found in the bed of the pickup. All soldiers had their serviceable equipment including their body armour and boots taken from them. Footage taken from Jeremiah Johnson's helmet camera was later posted online which showed the engagement and subsequent deaths of the soldiers.

On 6 October, the body of La David Johnson was found by children tending cattle. His body was nearly 1.5 kilometres (1 mile) away from the scene of the ambush. On 12 November, additional remains of La David Johnson were found at the site where his body was recovered. All soldiers showed wounds consistent with small arms fire and had received additional bursts of fire at close range. All deaths were considered either instantly fatal or rapidly fatal.

== Casualties ==
Among the Nigeriens, five were killed and eight were wounded. Among the US soldiers, four were killed: Staff Sergeant Bryan Black, Staff Sergeant Jeremiah Johnson, Sergeant La David Johnson, and Staff Sergeant Dustin Wright. Two US soldiers who were wounded in the ambush were transferred to the Landstuhl Regional Medical Center in Germany. A senior US intelligence official told ABC News that at least 21 militants were killed, all of which were buried on the Malian side of the border.

=== Americans ===
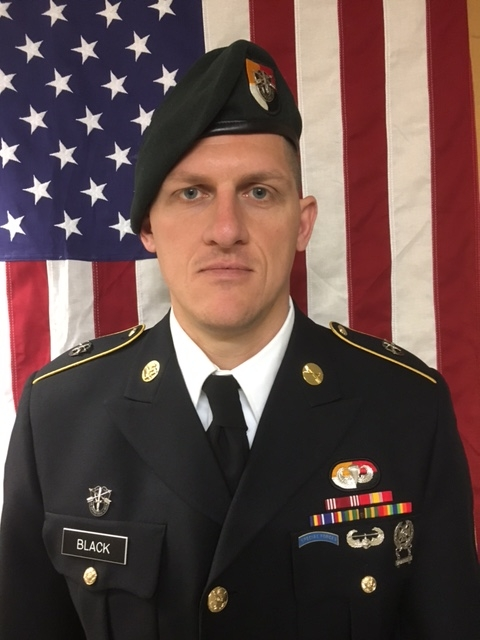
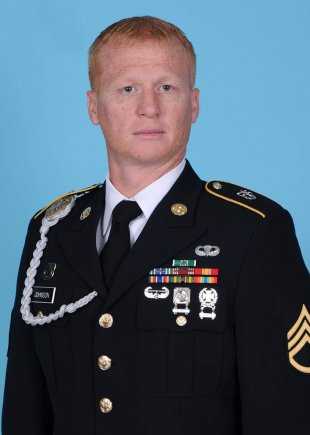
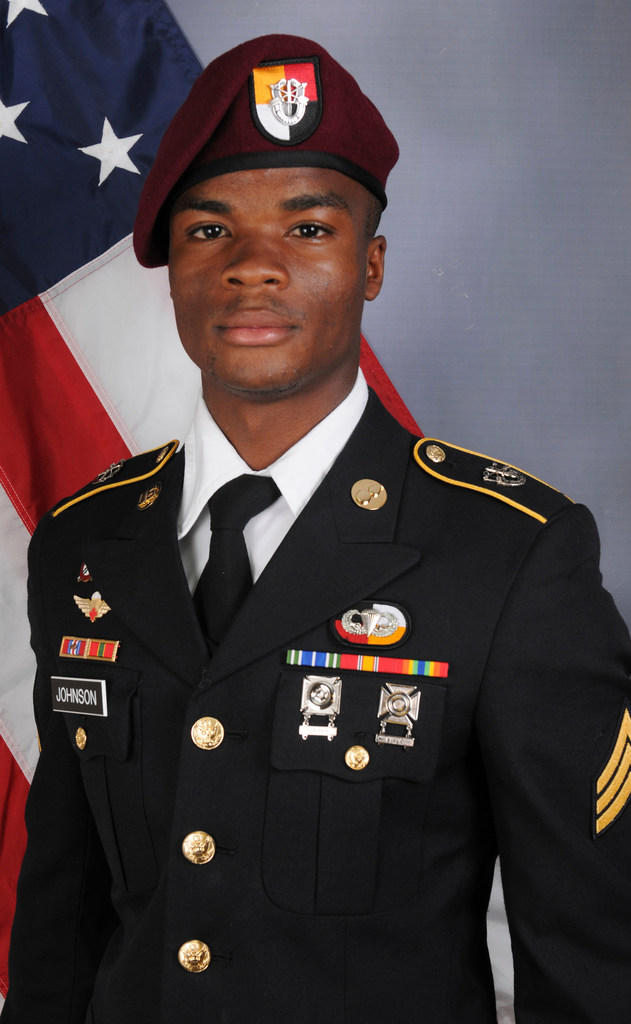
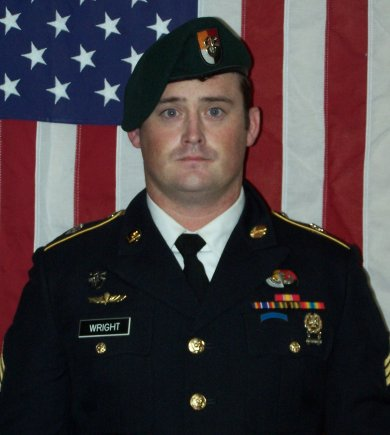
Clockwise from upper left (ascending order for mobile users): Staff Sergeant Bryan Black, Staff Sergeant Jeremiah Johnson, Staff Sergeant Dustin Wright, Sergeant La David Johnson.

==== Bryan Black ====
Bryan Christopher Black (1982–2017) of Puyallup, Washington, was born in Camp Pendleton, California, to Henry and Karen Black. While in school, Black learned to play chess and, by the sixth grade, had earned a national ranking. Black graduated from Puyallup High School in 2000. At the age of 20, Black earned a business degree at Central Washington University. Black moved to Mammoth Lakes, California, where he taught skiing, worked construction jobs in the off season, and met his wife, Michelle. They would later move to Fayetteville, North Carolina, where they raised two sons, Ezekiel and Isaac.

Black enlisted in the US Army in October 2009 and eventually became a Special Forces medical sergeant (18D), he was subsequently assigned to 2nd Battalion, 3rd SFG in June 2015 and deployed to Afghanistan for two months in July. He was awarded three medals during his service: the Good Conduct Medal, the National Defense Service Medal, and the Global War on Terrorism Service Medal. He spoke English, French, Arabic, and Hausa, the last of which is spoken in Niger.

Black's funeral was held in Fayetteville, North Carolina, on 18 October 2017. A memorial service was also held for Black on 19 November in Puyallup. US Representative Dennis Heck and Washington State Senator Hans Zeiger spoke at his memorial service.

==== Jeremiah Johnson ====
Jeremiah Wayne "JW" Johnson (1977–2017) of Springboro, Ohio, was born in New Bern, North Carolina, to J.W. and Debra Johnson, and graduated from North Stafford High School in 1996. After graduating high school, Johnson owned and operated a business until he enlisted in the US Army as a CBRN specialist in October 2007. He would later be assigned to the 3rd Special Forces Group as a support element. He previously deployed to Jordan in 2012. Johnson was married to Crystal and had two daughters, Addie and Elisa. His funeral was held in Fayetteville, North Carolina, on 19 October 2017.

He was posthumously promoted to the rank of Sergeant First Class and received the Bronze Star Medal with Valor.

==== La David Johnson ====
La David Terrence Johnson (1992–2017) was born in Miami Gardens, Florida, to Samara Johnson and Terrance McGriff. After his mother's death in September 1999, Johnson's care was entrusted to Richard and Cowanda Johnson. In 2010, Johnson graduated from Miami Carol City Senior High School.

Johnson's family enrolled him in 5000 Role Models, a mentorship program of US Representative Frederica Wilson that prepared African American children for college, vocational school, or the military. When Johnson was a Walmart employee in Miami, people in his community knew him as a local stunt rider and was called the "Wheelie King". In January 2014, Johnson enlisted in the US Army as a wheeled vehicle mechanic (91B). He was eventually assigned to the Second Battalion, Third Special Forces Group out of Fort Bragg, North Carolina. Johnson was awarded the Achievement Medal, the Good Conduct Medal, the Global War on Terrorism Service Medal, and the Army Service Ribbon during his service.

In school, Johnson met Myeshia Manual, whom he married on 22 August 2014. Johnson had her name tattooed on his chest. The couple had two children, Ah'Leesya and La David Jr., and one unborn child, La'Shee.

His funeral was held at a church in Cooper City, Florida, on 21 October 2017. with about 1,200 people in attendance, including Representative Wilson.

==== Dustin Wright ====
Dustin Michael Wright (1988–2017) of Lyons, Georgia, was born in Toombs County, Georgia, to Arnold Wright and Terri Criscio. Wright graduated from Toombs County High School in 2007. He attended Georgia Southern University and Fayetteville State University.

In July 2012, Wright enlisted in the US Army as an engineer and ultimately became a Special Forces engineer sergeant (18C) assigned to the 3rd Special Forces Group. His funeral was held at Toombs County High School on 15 October 2017.

A small section of Georgia Highway 1 was named in memorial of Wright in April 2019.

=== Nigeriens ===
Goubé Mahamadou Issaka was a NCO-cadet of the Gendarmerie.

Yacouba Issoufou was a soldat de 2nde classe (private) of the BSR.

Bagué Soumana was an adjudant-chef (Chief warrant officer) of the BSR.

Abdoul Rachid Yerimah was a soldat de 2nde classe (private) of the BSR.

They were buried in the Muslim Cemetery of Niamey on 7 October.

== Aftermath ==
=== Nigerien response ===
On 5 October, President Mahamadou Issoufou condemned the ambush and called for a moment of silence "to the memory of our soldiers who have fallen on the field of honour" and to the memory of "all victims of terrorism". On 6 October, Issoufou declared three days of national mourning. On 7 October, the deceased Nigerien soldiers were buried after their bodies were taken from the city morgue in Niamey with Defence Minister Kalla Moutari, US Ambassador Eunice Reddick, and Nigerien lawmakers watching. On 21 October, a Niger security source told AFP that the village chief, Mounkaila Alassane, was arrested for "complicity" with the militants.

In an interview with Voice of America, Almou Hassane, the mayor of Tondikiwindi, alleged that residents of Tongo Tongo were complicit in the ambush: "The attackers, the bandits, the terrorists have never lacked accomplices among local populations".

On 1 November, Prime Minister Brigi Rafini said that Niger was open to allowing US drone strikes against terror groups. On 30 November, the government of Niger gave the US permission to fly armed drones out of Niamey.

Karimou Yacouba, the local member of the National Assembly, told The Guardian, "Everything that happened could have been prevented if help had arrived sooner".

=== US response ===
==== White House response ====
The ambush was the deadliest combat incident involving US soldiers since Donald Trump took office as president on 20 January 2017. On the day of the ambush, Trump was briefed by telephone by White House Chief of Staff John Kelly. The former was aboard Air Force One, having left Las Vegas after visiting victims and first responders affected by a recent mass shooting.

On 17 October, during a press conference, Trump was asked about his silence by a reporter and commented on the incident. Trump responded by saying that he wrote letters to the families of the victims, and accused his predecessors, specifically President Obama, of not or rarely calling the families of deceased soldiers.

On 16 October, Trump called the widow of La David Johnson. Representative Frederica Wilson, who was present during the call, alleged that Trump told the widow that La David Johnson "knew what he signed up for" and only referred to him as "your guy". This account was disputed by Trump, who said that he "had a very nice conversation with the woman, with the wife" and accused Wilson of "fabricating" her account.

On 18 October, White House Press Secretary Sarah Huckabee Sanders declared that Wilson had willfully mischaracterized the spirit of the conversation. On CNN, Wilson said, "This might wind up to be Mr. Trump's Benghazi". On 19 October, Kelly, whose son was killed in the War in Afghanistan in 2010, defended Trump's call with the widow of La David Johnson. On 23 October, Trump wrote on Twitter, "I had a very respectful conversation with the widow of La David Johnson, and spoke his name from beginning, without hesitation!"

On 25 October, Trump told reporters that he did not "specifically" authorize the mission in Niger.

In a United Nations Security Council meeting on 30 October, US ambassador Nikki Haley pledged $60 million towards a new counterterrorism force in West Africa. Haley also expected the G5 Sahel to "take on full regional ownership of the force within a period of three to six years, with continued US engagement". Secretary of State Rex Tillerson said that the money would "bolster our regional partners" in fighting against militant groups.

On 13 December, Wilson told Jonathan Capehart on his podcast that there was a cover-up.

==== Congressional response ====
Senator John McCain stated that the Trump administration was not being forthcoming about the details of the ambush. McCain also said that the Senate Armed Services Committee, of which he was the chairman, would like to get the information "it deserves and needs", before deciding whether a formal investigation is necessary. On 19 October, McCain said that a subpoena may be required to determine what happened in Niger. On 20 October, McCain and Mattis met in McCain's office in the United States Capitol. After the meeting, Mattis told reporters, "We can do better at communication". On the same day, Senator Lindsey Graham said that the members of the Senate Armed Services Committee will be briefed next week. After a meeting with Mattis, Graham told reporters that the rules of engagement would be changing and warned that the US should anticipate more military operations in Africa as the war on terrorism continues to morph.

On 26 October, Robert Karem, the Assistant Secretary of Defense for International Security Affairs, and Air Force Major General Albert Elton briefed the Senate Armed Services Committee in a closed session. After the briefing, Senator Ted Cruz said that "on the initial assessment there were not significant steps that could have been taken to prevent this assault". However, Senator Richard Blumenthal said, "I could not look those families in the eye and say we're doing everything we need to do to provide sufficient intelligence that will enable them to be successful in their missions and avoid the kind of catastrophe that we saw here". McCain said the ambush was "a direct result" of budget sequestration.

On 9 May 2019, US Representative Ruben Gallego urged senators to oppose Patrick M. Shanahan's nomination as Secretary of Defense, alleging that he "mishandled" the investigation into the Tongo Tongo ambush.

==== Military response and inquiries ====
External videos
- Defense Department briefing with Pentagon spokesperson Dana White and Joint Staff Director Lt. Gen. Kenneth McKenzie, 12 October 2017, C-SPAN
- Statements by US Secretary of Defense James Mattis regarding the 4 Oct. incident in Niger, 19 October 2017, C-SPAN
- Defense Department briefing with Dana White and Lt. Gen. Kenneth McKenzie, 19 October 2017, C-SPAN

In October 2017, Defense Secretary James Mattis said that the ambush was "considered unlikely". Officials from the Department of Defense said that soldiers had carried out 29 similar operations in the past six months with no problems, and such operations were considered routine by the time of the ambush. General Joseph Dunford, the Chairman of the Joint Chiefs of Staff, provided new information about the ambush to the public and said that the operation was initially a reconnaissance mission.

In December 2017, Major General Mark Hicks, the commander of Special Operations Command, Africa (SOCAFRICA), wrote a letter to the Special Operations Forces that read, "To reinforce and clarify guidance going forward I would like to emphasize that we must reduce our risk exposure and build trust in our ability to exercise sound judgment and disciplined planning and execution".

On 10 May 2018, the US Department of Defense released an unclassified executive summary of the DoD's investigation and gave a briefing on the outcome of the department's investigation. The report found that "personnel turnover" had caused the 11-member US Special Forces team to forgo important training before being deployed, and that the team did not rehearse the mission. The investigation also found that "two junior officers had 'mischaracterized' the mission" in planning documents. The report did not make specific recommendations on the handling of future missions. Some within the US military were critical of the report because they viewed it as underplaying blame for senior officers who had approved of the mission.

On 17 May 2018, the US Department of Defense released a 23-minute video showing a digital recreation of the ambush.

==== Family members' response ====
On 18 October, Cowanda Jones-Johnson, who was also present during the conference call, confirmed Wilson's account saying "Yes, [Wilson's] statement is true", and "I was in the car and I heard the full conversation". Jones-Johnson said, "President Trump did disrespect my son and my daughter and also me and my husband". On the same day, Arnold Wright said that Trump was respectful when he called with his condolences, "He talked to me about the loss of my son and how he served with honor and dignity and he just wanted to give me a call to thank me".

On 23 October, Myeshia Johnson said on ABC's Good Morning America that Wilson's account of the call with Trump was "100 percent correct" and that the call "made [her] cry even worse". She said she didn't like Trump's tone and that she broke down when Trump fumbled her husband's name. Myeshia Johnson wanted to see her husband's body, but was reportedly not allowed to do so by the military.

On 25 October, Michelle Black said she was grateful that Trump called her and spoke to her children: "So, yeah he was very gracious and I appreciate anyone who calls cause, like I said, that takes quite a bit of bravery to call into that kind of situation".

On 18 December, Jones-Johnson accused the Department of Defense of lying to her family about how her son was killed. La David Johnson's sister, Richshama, said, "We find out everything via social media".

==== Media response ====
On 18 October, Mark Landler and Yamiche Alcindor, reporters from The New York Times, drew comparisons between the incident with the phone call to La David Johnson's widow and Trump's feud with the parents of another American soldier killed in action, Humayun Khan, during the 2016 US presidential election. On the same day, three reporters from the Los Angeles Times wrote that his response "illustrated the hazards of his extemporaneous governing style, the disorganization within his White House, and his refusal to back down in the face of criticism".

On 20 October, National Review senior writer David French criticized the comparison between the ambush and the 2012 Benghazi attack and said, "All available evidence suggests that this is a tragedy rather than a scandal". Laura Seay, an assistant professor of government at Colby College, shared French's view in an article on Slate.

On 20 October, Jason Ditz wrote an article for The American Conservative saying, "Niger provides a terrifying reminder of how far we are from being an informed American public that serves as a check and balance on what our military is doing in our name. We can't have a debate on US intervention overseas if we don't even know where are our forces are, let alone to what end". On 26 October, Phillip Carter and Andrew Swick wrote on Vox, sharing a similar view that missions similar to the one in Niger "have never been specifically authorized by Congress, let alone discussed and debated by the American public". On 27 October, The New York Times editorial board wrote that "the lack of clarity about the Niger operation is one more reason for Congress to replace the 2001 law authorizing military force against Al Qaeda with legislation to address current threats like the Islamic State, limit American interventions, and ensure regular congressional oversight".

On 10 November, local villagers told The Washington Post that La David Johnson's body was found with his arms tied, but the Associated Press reported on 17 December that there were no indications he was shot at close range, had been bound, or taken prisoner.

Interviewed in a 2020 documentary, United States Army veteran and author Paul Rieckhoff described the significance of the incident:

When I watch that video I think of the worst-case scenario. When you go through training at Fort Benning as an infantryman you think you'll never be left alone... we always say, "leave no man behind," and that video is American troops left behind, left to die. If we have drones and satellite eyes in space, how do we let American troops get abandoned? It's outrageous, and it's the epitome of how little, at times, our political leadership cares about the troops.

=== ISGS response ===
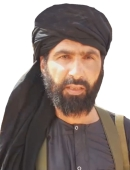
Adnan Abu Walid al-Sahrawi, the leader of the Islamic State in the Greater Sahara

On 12 January 2018, the ISGS claimed responsibility for the attack after a long delay. In a statement attributed to Adnan Abu Walid al-Sahrawi, the group said, "We declare our responsibility for the attack on the US commandos last October in the Tongo Tongo region of Niger".

=== Investigation ===
Multiple US officials told CNN that the French military was leading an investigation to gather intelligence about the perpetrators of the ambush. A spokesperson from the French Ministry of the Armed Forces said on 5 October that French soldiers who were participating in Operation Barkhane and based in Chad were involved in an operation in Niger. On 10 October, CNN reported that a US defense official had shared details of an after action report that consisted of interviews with the survivors of the ambush. A senior congressional aide told NBC News that the ambush was caused by a "massive intelligence failure" with no overhead surveillance of the mission, or a quick reaction force in place to swiftly respond in the event that the mission went wrong.

On 19 October, NBC News reported that AFRICOM sent a team to Niger to conduct a "review of the facts". According to The Wall Street Journal, the Federal Bureau of Investigation has since joined the investigation. The US Department of Defense released military records on 26 October that showed that the killed US soldiers had little to no experience in combat. For Wright, Niger was his first overseas deployment.

On 26 October, Dunford announced that Army Major General Roger Cloutier would lead the investigation into the ambush.

On 2 November, four senior Nigerien officials told ABC News that the operation was always a kill or capture mission, contradicting the statement made by Dunford on 23 October. On 8 November, the US Department of Defense said that the investigation would be completed in January 2018. On 5 December, people with knowledge of the operation told BuzzFeed that what happened in Niger "was the result of reckless behavior by US Special Forces".

After a Twitter user published a series of posts claiming to have footage from the ambush, AFRICOM said on 24 January 2018, "We are reviewing the post and determining the veracity of the tweet and the assertions that there is an associated video".

In November 2018, the US military sent letters of reprimand to four officers and two soldiers, most notably to Air Force Major General Marcus Hicks, who was in charge of special operations forces in Africa, and Captain Michael Perozeni.

=== Medals ===
Nine valor medals, including four Silver Stars, were awarded to members of ODA 3212 for their actions during the ambush. Staff Sgt. Dustin Wright and Sgt. La David Johnson were posthumously awarded the Silver Star while Staff Sgt. Bryan Black and Sgt. First Class Jeremiah Johnson posthumously received the Bronze Star with Valor.

Six medals were awarded to Nigerien soldiers. Adjutant Chef Bagué Soumana and Soldier 2nd Class Abdoul Rachid Yarima were posthumously awarded, while four surviving soldiers received their awards in an October 2019 ceremony in Niamey. The decorations included one Army Commendation Medal with Valor and three Army Achievement Medals.

Two Nigeriens received Bronze Stars with Valor for their actions during the ambush – one for a Nigerien who joined in a flanking maneuver against the ISGS militants and one for a Nigerien who exposed himself to stop friendly fire coming from a quick reaction force's heavy machine-gun.

As of October 2022, Jeremiah Johnson was awarded the Silver Star.

=== Recovery of equipment ===
In March 2018, more than five months after the attack, the SUV used by the Americans and the helmet cam footage was discovered by Tuareg Rebels in Mali after clashes with bandits in the border area. They offered to return it to the US by legal means.

On 19 December 2018, more than a year after the ambush, a sidearm belonging to SSG Jeremiah Johnson was recovered by French forces during an operation in the Mali-Niger border region.

=== Bounty and recovery of video ===
On 4 October 2019, the United States offered a $5 million bounty on Adnan Abu Walid al-Sahrawi under the Rewards for Justice program. He was killed by French forces in a mid-2021 raid and a 45-minute video of the 2017 incident was recovered.

A senior IS-GS commander Abu Huzeifa, on whom the US had placed a $5 million bounty for his role in the ambush, was killed in April 2024 in a joint operation by forces of Mali, Niger and Burkina Faso.

== See also ==
- December 2017 Chad Basin clash
- Uzbin Valley ambush
- Insurgency in the Sahel
- Niger–United States relations
- Northern Mali conflict
- Operation Barkhane
- Operation Enduring Freedom – Trans Sahara
- MINUSMA super camp attack
