= Berry Aviation =

American charter airline

Berry Aviation, Inc
IATA	ICAO	Call sign
-	BYA	BERRY
- Founded: 1983
- Operating bases: HYI, CAK, ABQ, DTO
- Hubs: San Marcos Municipal Airport, Akron-Canton Airport
- Fleet size: 25
- Headquarters: San Marcos, Texas, United States
- Website: http://www.berryaviation.com

Berry Aviation, Inc is an American charter airline with its headquarters based in San Marcos, Texas. It operates charters for the US Department of Defense in multiple locations worldwide and Part 135 On-Demand Cargo across North America and the Caribbean. It was founded in 1983.

== Fleet ==
The Berry Aviation fleet includes the following aircraft (as of December 2021):

Berry Aviation Fleet
Aircraft	In Fleet	Orders	Passengers	Notes
De Havilland Canada DHC-6-300 Twin Otter	3	—		(as of August 2025)
De Havilland Canada DHC-8-200	7	—		(as of August 2025)
Embraer EMB 120ER Brasilia	9	—		(as of August 2025)
Total	19			

The airline fleet previously included the following aircraft:

- 3 further Dornier 328-100
- 4 UH-72 Lakota Helicopters
- 23 Fairchild SA226/227

== 2017 Niger terrorist incident ==
On October 4, 2017, four U.S. Army personnel and five Nigerien soldiers were killed and two more injured after being ambushed while assisting local forces in Southwest Niger. It was later reported that private contractors working for Berry Aviation "conducted casualty evacuation and transport for U.S. and partner forces". Berry Aviation was described as having a "sole source bridge contract" in Niamey for duties including casualty evacuation.

== 2017 hurricane relief and pet evacuation flights ==
Starting on August 28, 2017, Berry Aviation conducted over fifty flights for Wings of Rescue and the Humane Society of the United States, carrying over 100 tons of emergency supplies into the Hurricane Harvey, Irma and Maria zones and then flying over 4,500 pets, who otherwise would have died, to safety at no-kill animal shelters throughout the mainland United States.

== Accidents and incidents ==
Type	Flight	Date	Aircraft	Location	Description	Damage	Injuries	Fatalities	Probable Cause
Accident	BYA233	September 20, 2018	N233SW	Houston, TX	A Berry Aviation Embraer EMB-120, registration N233SW performing flight BYA-480 from Shreveport, LA (USA) to Querétaro (Mexico), was en-route at 18,000 feet near Houston, TX (USA) when unsecured cargo shifted. The crew continued the flight to Querétaro for a landing without further incident.	Substantial	None	None	Unsecured Cargo
Accident	BYA969	August 15, 2019	N322AV	San Marcos, TX	On August 15, 2019, at 1233 central daylight time, a De Havilland DHC-6-300 airplane, N322AV, impacted runway 13 during a go-around at San Marcos Regional Airport (HYI), San Marcos, Texas. The airplane sustained substantial damage.	Substantial	3 Minor	None	The pilot's delayed go-around attempt and the flight instructor's delayed remedial action that resulted in a nose-down impact with terrain during an attempted go-around.
Accident	BYA233	March 7, 2021	N233SW	Ypsilanti, MI	Berry Aviation flight BYA233, an Embraer EMB-120ER Brasilia, performed a gear-up landing at Detroit-Willow Run Airport, Michigan (YIP). The aircraft was damaged beyond repair.	Substantial	None	None	Under Investigation
