= Sabara Bangou =

- Village
- Location within Niger
- Coordinates: 15°7′3.85″N 1°59′45.43″E
- Country: Niger
- Region: Tillabéri
- Department: Ouallam
- Rural commune: Tondikwindi
- Elevation: 889 ft (271 m)

Population (2012)
  - Total: 111,490
- (for the whole of Tondikwindi Commune)
- Time zone: UTC+1

Sabara Bangou is a village in the north of the rural commune (municipality) of Tondikiwindi (also Tondi Kiwindi), Ouallam Department, Tillabéri Region in southwestern Niger, 180 km north of the nation's capital Niamey and 22 km south of the border with Mali.
The village has about 70-75 huts/dwellings, irregularly clustered. There are no roads, just trails that connect to nearby villages such as Soufaré (to the SE, 11.8 km), Tiloa (to the SE, 9.0 km), Diéno Koara (to the SE, 5.0 km), Tongo Tongo (to the SW, 18.7 km), Sinka Koira (to the SSW, 17.8 km), Gollo (to the SSW, 20.3 km), Gouré Tondi (to the SW, 21.1 km) and Kokorobé Koukou (to the SW, 25.8 km).
The population of the commune consists for 99% of the Zarma people (also called Djerma). Most of them own cattle, sheep, goats and dromedaries, renting them out to the Fulani people or Tuareg people for tending. Though arable land is rare and poor, there is also some agriculture, mostly millet and sorghum. The area is part of the Sahel and consists of a vast expanse of plateaux and hills. The physical environment is in an advanced state of degradation caused by habitat destruction, poaching, and by the viccisitudes of the local climate.

In March 2017 the Government of Niger declared a state of emergency in the Ouallam Department (and thus in Sabara Bangou) because of the spill-over from the war in nearby Mali, where large areas are under the control of jihadist groups linked to Al-Qaeda. As of fall 2017, many western nations advise against all travel in the Ouallam Department. The U.S. military has been operating in that area with local forces to help them fight terrorism and to disrupt the militants' movements.

== Climate ==
Sabara Bangou has a desert climate. From October to April there is virtually no rainfall. According to Köppen and Geiger, this climate is classified as BWh. The average annual temperature is 29.4 °C. Average annual precipitation is about 245 mm; most of it falls in August, about 102 mm. May is the warmest month of the year; with a 24h temperature average of 34.0 °C and a daily average maximum of 41 °C. January is the coldest month, on average 23.7 °C.
