= Tondikiwindi =

Coordinates: 14°27′38″N 2°01′53″E

- Commune and village
- Interactive map of Tondikiwindi
- Country: Niger
- Region: Tillabéri
- Department: Ouallam

Government
  - Mayor: Almou Hassane

Area
  - Total: 2,700 sq mi (6,994 km^{2})

Population (2012 census)
  - Total: 111,490
  - Density: 41.29/sq mi (15.94/km^{2})
- Time zone: UTC+1 (WAT)

Tondikiwindi is a village and rural commune in Niger. It administers the villages of Tchoma Bangou and Zaroumadareye. As of 2012, it had a population of 111,490.

The village of Tongo Tongo is located in this commune. The Tongo Tongo ambush of US soldiers by ISIS affiliated group occurred here on 4 October 2017.
