= Air Expeditionary Task Force =

An Air Expeditionary Task Force (AETF) is a deployed numbered air force (NAF) or command echelon immediately subordinate to an NAF that is provided as the U.S. Air Force component command committed to a joint operation.

== Notional AETF Composition ==
Forward Deployed (75 total)	Function	On-call (100 total)
18 x F-15C	Counterair	6
10 x F-15E	Counterland	14
8 x F-16CJ	Counterair/Counterland	10
12 x A-10	Counterland (CAS)	14 (ANG)
3 x E-3	Surveillance/C2	0
3 x HH-60	CSAR	9
8 x C-130	Airlift (Intra-Theater)	10 (ANG)
4 x KC-10	Air Refueling	2
3 x KC-135	Air Refueling	7 (ANG)
3 x KC-135	Air Refueling	7 (ANG)
3 x C-21A	Airlift	6
0 x B-52/B-1	Strategic Attack	6
0 x B-2	Strategic Attack	3
0 x F-117	Strategic Attack	6

High Demand/Low Density assets tasked as required: E-3, E-8, U-2, EC-130, RC-135, CSAR

== See also ==
- List of Air Expeditionary Wings of the United States Air Force
