= Doundou Chefou =

Nigerien militant

Ibrahim Doundou Chefou is a Nigerien militant and a key commander in the Islamic State in the Greater Sahara.

== Background ==
Chefou is believed to have led the ambush of a convoy of U.S. and Nigerien troops in October 2017, that left four American and five Nigerien soldiers dead. Formerly a Fulani herder in the Niger-Mali border region, he initially took up arms to battle Tuareg cattle thieves. According to The New York Times, U.S. troops were attempting to locate Chefou in October 2017 when at least fifty militants, allegedly under his leadership, attacked them near the village of Tongo Tongo in southwestern Niger.

Chefou is considered by African officials to be one of the main propagators of unrest in the Sahel region. Niger's defense minister labeled him a "terrorist" and a "bandit".

== See also ==
- Tongo Tongo ambush
- Insurgency in the Maghreb (2002–present)
- Islam in Niger
- Fulani herdsmen
- Niger Armed Forces
