= Niger Air Base 201 =

American drone airbase near Agadez

Niger Air Base 201 Nigerien Air Base 201
- Agadez, Agadez Region in Niger
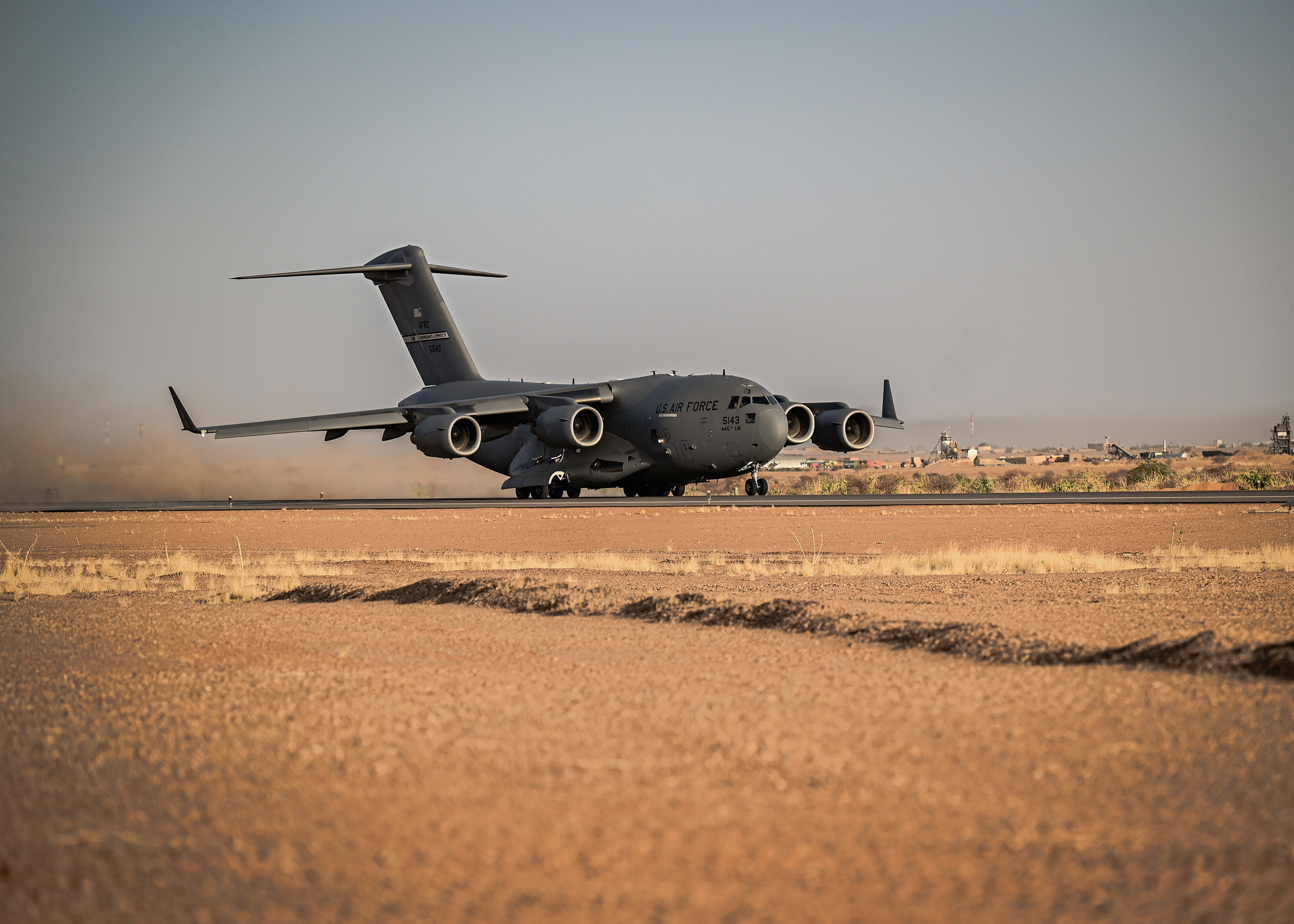
- A U.S. Air Force C-17 Globemaster III taking off from the base in 2021

Site information
- Owner: Niger Armed Forces
- Operator: Niger Armed Forces

Location
- Location within Niger
- Coordinates: 16°57′01″N 8°00′50″E

Site history
- Built: 2016–2019
- In use: November 2019 – present

Airfield information
- Elevation: 505 metres (1,657 ft) AMSL
Runways
Direction	Length and surface
07/25	1,890 metres (6,201 ft) Asphalt

Niger Air Base 201 (also known in some sources as "Nigerien Air Base 201") is a Nigerien airbase near Agadez, Niger.

The base is about 5 km southeast of Agadez. The Nigerien military controls the base, but was built and paid for by the United States. The US Army used the base for drone operation during the American Intervention in Niger. As of January 2025, the site consisted of a runway, a hangar, and numerous smaller buildings for personnel to work and live in, and is in Nigerien control.

== Construction ==
Congress approved US$50 million for construction of the base, but the cost ended up exceeding $100 million. The Air Base was described by U.S. officials as the largest construction project led by the United States Air Force. A report by the Department of Defense Inspector General criticized the project for skirting congressional oversight, failing to complete an adequate site survey, and not constructing the base to meet safety, security, and other technical requirements, findings that were disputed by the Air Force and U.S. Africa Command.

The runway was constructed to accommodate both General Atomics MQ-9 Reaper armed drones as well as the much larger Boeing C-17 Globemaster III transport airplanes. Runway construction was undertaken by the 31st Expeditionary Rapid Engineer Deployable Heavy Operational Repair Squadron Engineers. Construction was scheduled to be completed by the end of 2018, but delays pushed the completion date to spring 2019.

== Operations ==
The U.S. military presence at Base 201 began on 19 April 2016.

In July 2019, the 409th Air Expeditionary Group and the 411th Civil Affairs Battalion were stationed at the base. Intelligence, surveillance, and reconnaissance flights officially began on 1 November 2019.

On 16 March 2024, Niger's government announced that it was breaking off "with immediate effect" its military cooperation agreement with the United States. On 7 July 2024, the U.S. completed withdrawal of all troops from Air Base 101, while 500 remaining troops left Air Base 201 on 5 August.

On 6 August 2024, the US officially returned Air Base 201 to Nigerien control.

== See also ==
- US military intervention in Niger
- List of United States drone bases
