= Tongo Tongo =

- Village
- Location within Niger
- Coordinates: 15°3′11.56″N 1°50′7.85″E
- Country: Niger
- Region: Tillabéri
- Department: Ouallam
- Rural commune: Tondikiwindi

Government
  - Mayor: Almou Hassane
- Elevation: 317 m (1,040 ft)

Population (2012)
  - Total: 111,490
- (for the whole of Tondikwindi Commune)
- Time zone: UTC+1

Tongo Tongo (French pronunciation: [tɔ̃ɡo tɔ̃ɡo]) is a village in the rural commune (municipality) of Tondikiwindi (also Tondi Kiwindi), Ouallam Department, Tillabéri Region in southwestern Niger, 174 km north of the nation's capital Niamey and 28 km south of the border with Mali. The village has about 160-170 huts/dwellings, irregularly clustered. There are no roads, only trails that connect to nearby villages such as Siwili, Firo, Sabara Bangou, Sinka Koira, Gollo, Gouré Tonndi, Kokorobé Koukou, and Zerma Daré.

The population of the commune consists of 99% Zarma people (also called Djerma). Most of them own cattle, sheep, goats and dromedaries, renting them out to the Fulani people or Tuareg people for tending. Though arable land is rare and poor, there is also some agriculture, mostly millet and sorghum. The area is part of the Sahel and consists of a vast expanse of plateau and hills. The physical environment is in an advanced state of degradation caused by habitat destruction, poaching, and the vicissitudes of the local climate.

== Armed conflict ==
In March 2017, the Nigerien government declared a state of emergency in the Ouallam Department (and thus in Tongo Tongo) because of the spill-over from the war in nearby Mali, where large areas are under the control of jihadist groups linked to Al-Qaeda. As of fall 2017, many western nations advise against all travel in the Ouallam Department. The U.S. military has been operating in that area with local forces to help them fight terrorism and to disrupt the militants' movements.

On October 4, 2017, an 11-man team of U.S. soldiers from the Army's 3rd Special Forces Group was operating with approximately 35 Forces Armees Nigeriennes (FAN) on a train and advise mission near Tongo Tongo. Militants, both Al-Qaeda in the Islamic Maghreb (AQIM) and ISIS, had been using a nearby route to travel back and forth into Mali and back to a base camp in Niger and traffic in black market merchandise. The Nigerien forces were working to disrupt this so-called rat line and interdict the militants. While scouting the route, the group came under attack by more than 50 enemy fighters, riding in a dozen vehicles and on about 20 motorcycles, firing from numerous directions with small arms. Four Army Special Forces soldiers, five Nigerien soldiers and at least 21 ISGS militants were killed in the ambush. A further eight Nigeriens and two US soldiers were wounded. Initially the US acknowledged only three killed, as the fourth soldier was initially missing; his body was found two days later at the location of the incident. US Africa Command communicated that the soldiers killed were Staff Sergeants Bryan Black (35) of Puyallup, Washington, Jeremiah Johnson (39) of Springboro, Ohio, Dustin Wright (29) of Lyons, Georgia, and Sgt. La David Johnson (25) of Miami Gardens, Florida.

No group has taken responsibility for the killings, although officials commented that the US suspected a local branch of Islamic State was responsible; they did not publicly name any group. At the time and location of the ambush, threats were deemed unlikely, so there was no overhead armed air cover during the engagement. US Africa Command acknowledged the loss of elite US forces would trigger a review of how the US military carries out operations but did not suggest any move to scale back the American mission in Niger.

On December 27, 2018, the French Air Force, assisted by Nigerien ground forces and french special forces, conducted a raid near the village, killing 15 terrorists and destroying 20 motorcycles.

== Climate ==
Tongo Tongo has a desert climate. From October to April, there is virtually no rainfall. According to Köppen and Geiger, this climate is classified as BWh. The average annual temperature is 29.4 °C. Average annual precipitation is about 250 mm; most of it falls in August, about 104 mm. May is the warmest month of the year; with a 24h temperature average of 33.9 °C and a daily average maximum of almost 41 °C. January is the coldest month, on average 23.9 °C.
