= RAF Ashford =

Former Royal Air Force station in Kent, England

RAF Ashford USAAF Station AAF-417
- Near Ashford, Kent in England
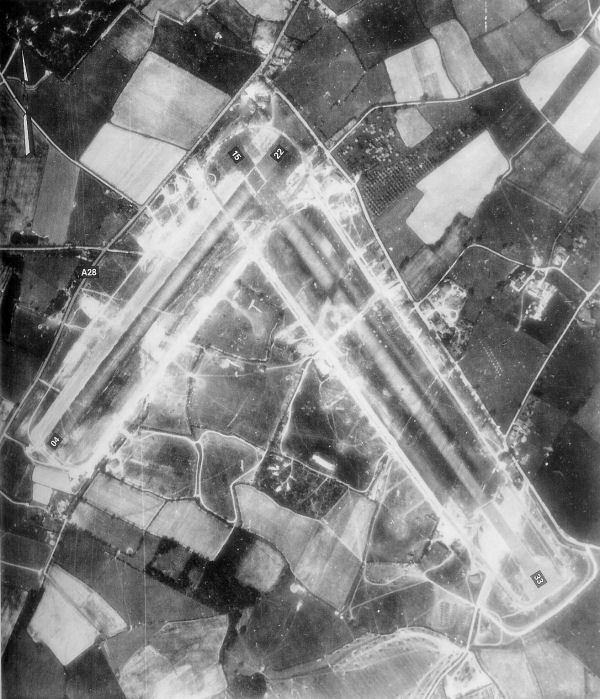
- Ashford Airfield, taken on 11 May 1944, during the tenure of the 406th Fighter Group, 3 weeks before D-Day.

Site information
- Type: RAF Advanced landing ground
- Code: ZF
- Owner: Air Ministry
- Operator: Royal Canadian Air Force; Royal Air Force; United States Army Air Forces 1944
- Controlled by: Second Tactical Air Force * No. 83 Group RAF; Ninth Air Force

Location
- Shown within Kent RAF Ashford (the United Kingdom)
- Coordinates: 51°07′31″N 000°48′58″E

Site history
- Built: 1943
- Built by: RAF Airfield Construction Service; Royal Canadian Engineers
- In use: March 1943 - September 1944
- Battles/wars: European theatre of World War II

Airfield information
- Elevation: 130 feet (40 m) AMSL
Runways
Direction	Length and surface
04/22	Sommerfeld tracking
14/32	Sommerfeld tracking

Royal Air Force Ashford or more simply RAF Ashford is a former Royal Air Force Advanced landing ground in Kent, England. The landing ground is located approximately 3 miles (4.8 km) west of Ashford just south of the A28 near the junction with Old Surrenden Manor Road.

Opened in 1943, Ashford was one of several prototypes for the temporary Advanced Landing Ground airfields built in France after D-Day, required as the Allied forces moved east across France and Germany. It was used by British, Dominion and the United States Army Air Forces. It was closed in September 1944.

Today the airfield is a mixture of agricultural fields with few recognisable remains.

== History ==
Unit	Dates	Aircraft	Variant	Notes
No. 65 (East India) Squadron RAF	October 1943	Supermarine Spitfire	IX	
No. 122 (Bombay) Squadron RAF	October 1943	Supermarine Spitfire	IX	
No. 414 Squadron RCAF	August–October 1943	North American Mustang	I	Part of the Canadian Reconnaissance Wing
No. 430 Squadron RCAF	August–October 1943	North American Mustang	I	Part of the Canadian Reconnaissance Wing

The following units were also here at some point:

- No. 129 Airfield Headquarters RAF (August - October 1943)
- No. 2817 Squadron RAF Regiment
- No. 2880 Squadron RAF Regiment
- No. 3205 Servicing Commando
- No. 3206 Servicing Commando
- No. 3207 Servicing Commando
- No. 3209 Servicing Commando

=== United States Army Air Forces use ===
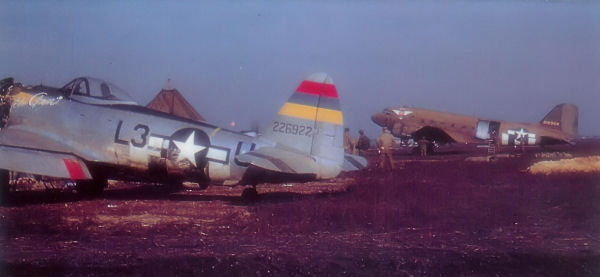
Republic P-47D-27-RE Thunderbolt Serial 42-26922 of the 512th Fighter Squadron. Note the C-47 in background.

Ashford was known as USAAF Station AAF-417 for security reasons by the USAAF during the war, and by which it was referred to instead of location. Its USAAF Station Code was "AF".

==== 406th Fighter Group ====
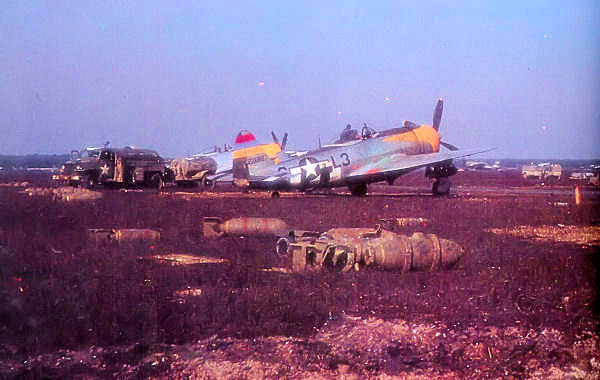
Republic P-47D-27-RE Thunderbolt Serial 42-6887 of the 512th Fighter Squadron

On 5 April the airmen of the 406th Fighter Group arrived, having crossed the Atlantic by troopship. The group arrived from Congaree Army Airfield, South Carolina. Operational fighter squadrons and fuselage codes were:

- 512th Fighter Squadron (L3) (yellow)
- 513th Fighter Squadron (4P) (red)
- 514th Fighter Squadron (O7) (blue)

The 406th Fighter Group was part of the 303d Fighter Wing, XIX Tactical Air Command operating Republic P-47 Thunderbolts.

The 406th Fighter Group conducted its first operation on 9 May and was chiefly involved in fighter-bomber work. On 18 when the 513th started to use ALG A-13 at Tour-en-Bessin. The last remnants of the 406th departed RAF Ashford on 31 July.

=== Bombing ===
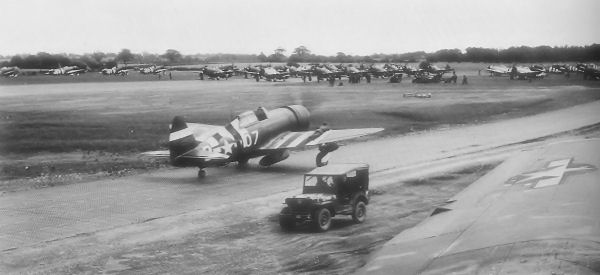
512th and 514th Fighter Squadron P-47s prepare to take off on runway 15–33. Note aircraft painted in D-Day invasion markings

The airfield was bombed during a night-time raid on 22 May 1944, at 12:35 am. A 1,000-pound (450 kg) high-explosive bomb was dropped in the tented area which accommodated the reserve flight pilots and other staff. These were RAF Volunteer Reservists of 5003 Airfield Construction Squadron, based at RAF Great Chart, some 1.2 km northeast of the airfield. There were 30 casualties, 14 being fatal.

== Current use ==
With the facility released from military control, Ashford was rapidly returned to agricultural use. There is little to indicate that an airfield ever existed at this location.

== See also ==
- List of former Royal Air Force stations
