= 303rd Fighter Wing =

United States Army Air Forces unit

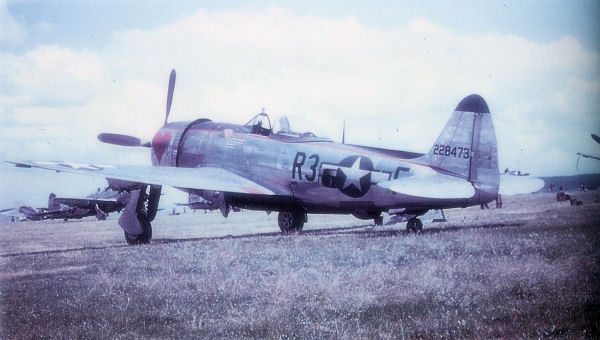
- P-47D-28-RA Thunderbolt (s/n 42-28473) of the 373rd Fighter Group at RAF Woodchurch, England (UK), in 1944
- Active: 1943–1945
- Country: United States
- Branch: United States Army
- Role: Command of Fighter units
- Engagements: European Theater of Operations

The 303rd Fighter Wing was a fighter aircraft wing of the United States Army Air Forces that operated in the European theater during World War II, flying P-47 Thunderbolts. Over two years from 1943, the 303rd flew air superiority, bomber escort and ground attack missions out of airfields in England, France, Belgium and the Netherlands before the end of the war in Europe in May 1945, thereafter supporting the occupation of Germany until deactivation in August of that year. Remnants of the 303rd existed in Germany until the end of 1945.

== History ==
Established on 15 November 1943 at Norfolk Army Airfield (now Norfolk International Airport), in Norfolk, Virginia, and commanded by Brigadier General Burton M. Hovey Jr. as of January 1944, the 303rd Fighter Wing deployed to Europe with IX Fighter Command, Ninth Air Force. Flying from RAF Ashford, its Thunderbolts strafed and bombed Axis vehicles, bridges, buildings, factories, troop concentrations, static defenses and airfields in occupied France before the June 1944 invasion of Normandy. IX Fighter Command escort sorties supported Eighth Air Force aircraft including B-24 and B-17 heavy bombers.

The 303rd flew close air support and air interdiction missions on D-Day, targeting Axis efforts to support and reinforce defensive forces in Normandy. Constant Allied airfield raids had all but eliminated Luftwaffe sorties over northern France, freeing up Allied fighters to focus on enemy ground targets as friendly troops poured onto the beaches. The Allies broke through in July at Saint-Lô with the 303rd overhead, liberated Paris in August, and drove toward Germany. The 303rd joined the XIX Tactical Air Command in November to support Third Army invasion forces moving from Nancy and Metz to the Siegfried Line near Saarbrücken and Haguenau.

Reassigned to support the United States Ninth Army in Belgium as a result of the German offensive during the Battle of the Bulge, December 1944. Attacked enemy targets in the Northern Rheinland during the Rhineland Campaign and Operation Grenade, which was the southern prong of a pincer attack coordinated with Canadian First Army's Operation Veritable, with the purpose of closing the front up to the Rhine River. By 10 March, the Rhine had been reached in all sectors of Ninth Army's front. It was not until after 20 March that Ninth Army units first crossed the Rhine itself.

Attacked ground targets in the Ruhr, providing air support as Allied ground forces encircled enemy forces in the Ruhr Pocket, essentially ending organized enemy resistance in Western Germany. Ninth Army halted its advance at the Elbe River in late April 1945, the wing engaging targets of opportunity in enemy-controlled areas until combat was ended on 5 May 1945.

Remained in Europe after the war as part of United States Air Forces in Europe, performing occupation duty and the destruction or shipment to the United States of captured enemy combat equipment. Demobilized in Germany and organization was inactivated on 20 November 1945.

=== Operations and decorations ===
- Combat Operations: Combat in European Theater of Operations (ETO), 8 March 1944-May 1945.
- Campaigns: Air Offensive, Europe;Normandy; Northern France; Rhineland; Ardennes-Alsace; Central Europe
- Decorations: Cited in the Order of the Day, Belgian Army: 1 Oct 1944-; Dec 1944-Jan 1945. Belgian Fourragere

=== Lineage ===
- Constituted as 303rd Fighter Wing on 15 Nov 1943

Activated on 24 Nov 1943
Disbanded on 12 August 1945

- Reconstituted on 31 July 1985 and consolidated with the 703rd Tactical Missile Wing as the 503rd Tactical Missile Wing

=== Assignments ===
- First Air Force, 24 November 1943 – 8 March 1944
- IX Fighter Command, 8 March-1 November 1944
- XIX Tactical Air Command, 1 November 1944 – 15 December 1944
- XXIX Tactical Air Command, 15 December 1944 – 20 November 1945

=== Components ===
- 36th Fighter Group: (P-47 Thunderbolt), 4 April-1 August 1944
- 373rd Fighter Group: (P-47 Thunderbolt), 4 April 1944 – 4 August 1945

Attached to: XIX Tactical Air Command, entire period

- 405th Fighter Group: (P-47 Thunderbolt), 1 August-1 October 1944

Attached to: XIX Tactical Air Command, entire period

- 406th Fighter Group: (P-47 Thunderbolt), 1 August-1 October 1944

Attached to: XIX Tactical Air Command, entire period

=== Stations ===
- Norfolk AAF, Virginia, 24 November 1943 – 12 February 1944
- RAF Ashford (AAF-417), England, 8 March 1944
- La Combe, France, 31 July 1944
- Houesville, France, 2 August 1944
- Rennes Airfield (A-27), France, 24 August 1944
- Vermand, France, 17 September 1944
- Arlon, Belgium, C. 3 October 1944
- Maastricht Airfield (Y-44), Netherlands, 22 October 1944
- Munchen-Gladbach Airfield (Y-56), Germany, 8 March 1945
- Haltern, Germany, 3 April 1945
- Gutersloh Airfield (Y-99), Germany, 14 April 1945
- Brunswick/Broitzem Airfield (R-38), Germany, 22 April – 20 November 1945
