= IX Fighter Command =

WWII US Army Air Forces command

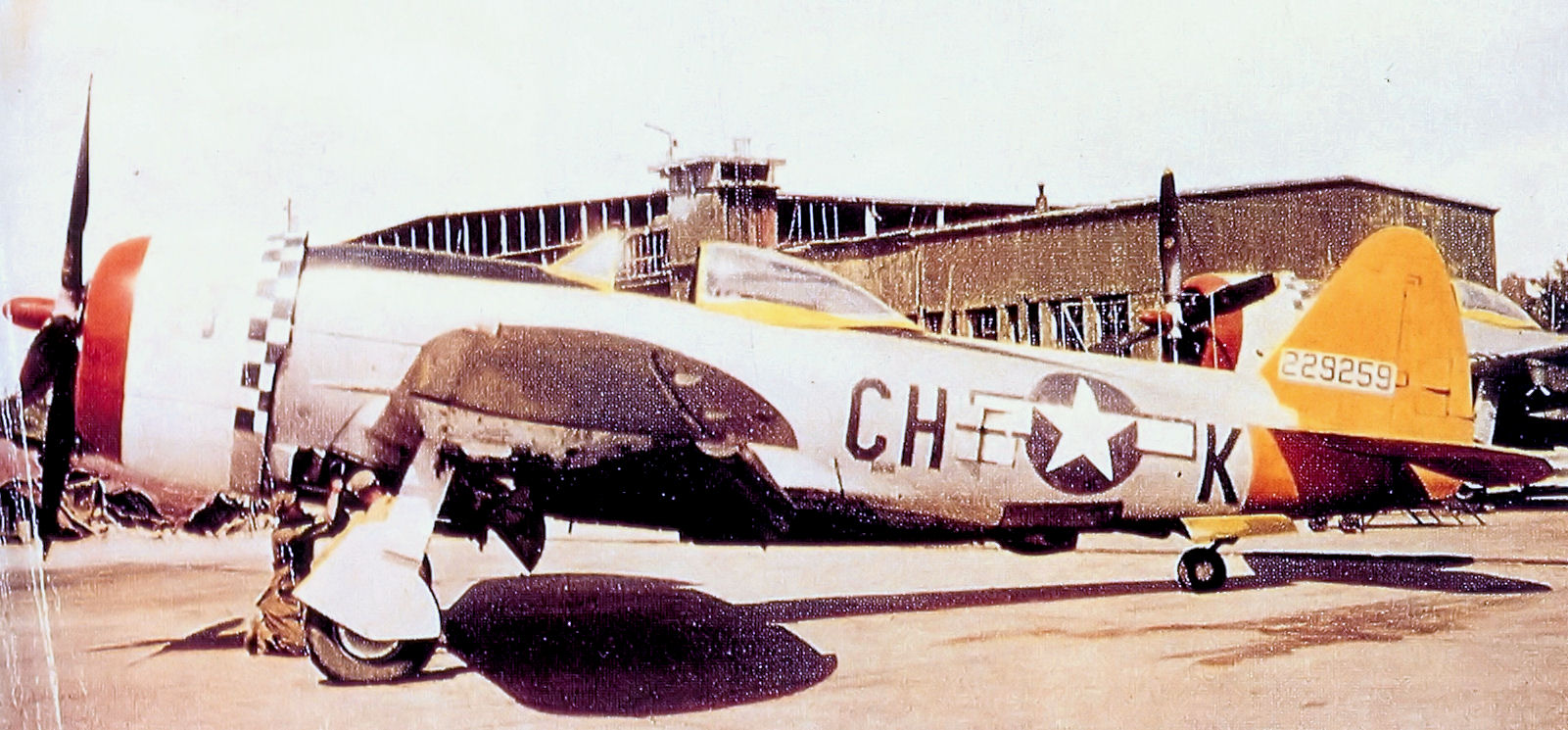
- Command P-47 Thunderbolt, the most common tactical aircraft in the command (Note: Aircraft is Republic P-47D-28-RA Thunderbolt, serial 42-29259 of the 358th Fighter Group.)
- Active: 1942–1945
- Country: United States
- Branch: United States Army (1942-47) United States Air Force (1947-48)
- Role: Command of fighter units
- Engagements: European Theater of Operations

Commanders
- Notable commanders: Maj Gen Elwood Richard Quesada

The IX Fighter Command was a United States Army Air Forces formation. Its last assignment was with the Ninth Air Force, based at Erlangen, Germany, where it was inactivated on 16 November 1945.

IX Fighter Command was the primary tactical fighter air arm of Ninth Air Force in the Western Desert Campaign in North Africa during 1942–1943. Transferred to England, it became the dominant tactical air force over the skies of Western Europe during the 1944 Battle of Normandy and the Western Allied invasion of Germany in 1945.

After its inactivation, the majority of its (along with Twelfth Air Force) units were incorporated into the postwar United States Air Force Tactical Air Command.

== History ==
=== North Africa ===
In Egypt during January 1943, IX Fighter Command became the control organization for Ninth Air Force fighter units assigned to the Western Desert Campaign (Libya and Tunisia).

Although wings were officially subordinate to the command, combat groups were attached to the Desert Air Force, which included squadrons of the Royal Air Force, Royal Australian Air Force and South African Air Force.

IX Fighter Command moved to England in November 1943 as part of Normandy invasion planning. Its subordinate units were reassigned to the Twelfth Air Force.

=== Western Europe ===
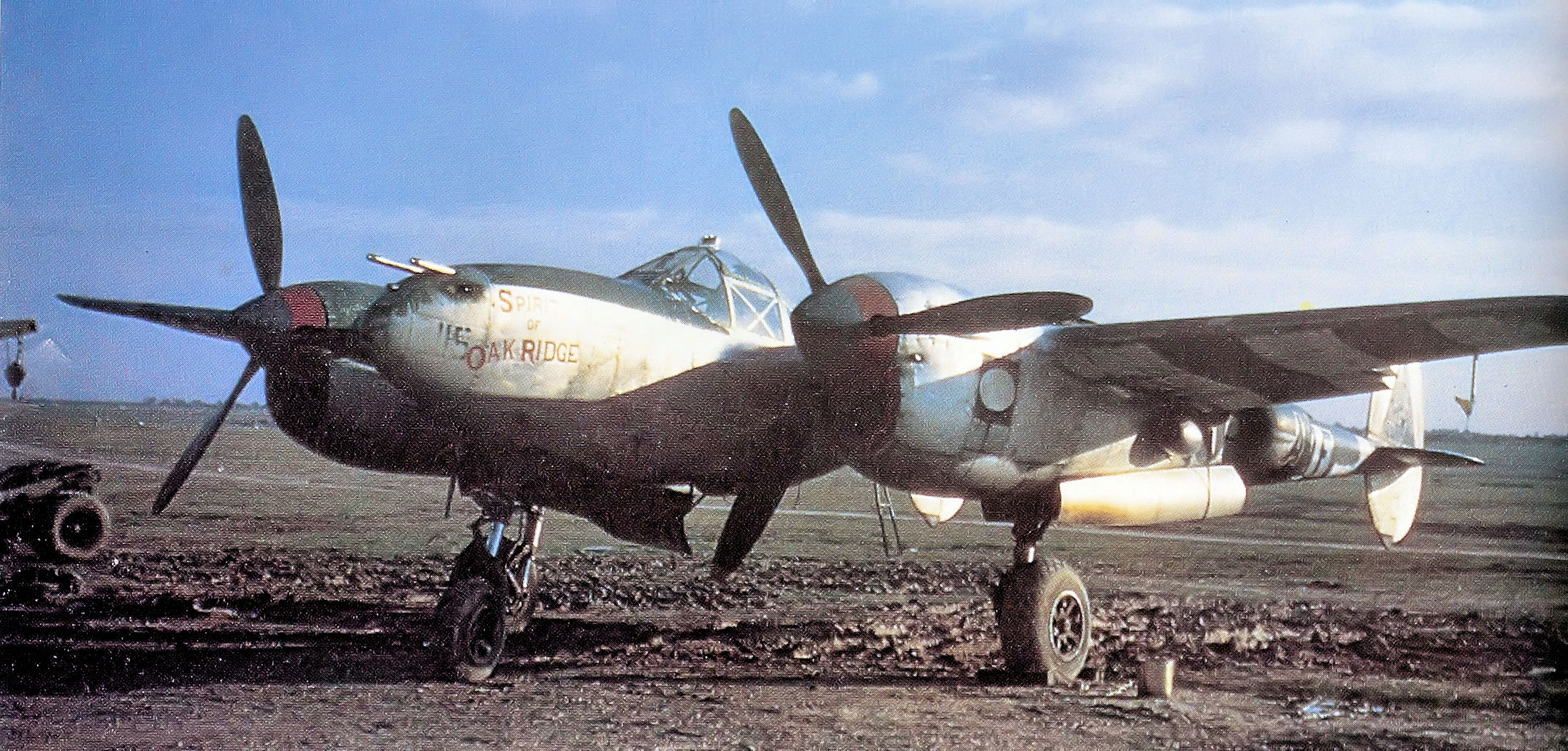
370th Fighter Group P-38 Lightning

During the winter of 1943/44 IX Fighter Command expanded at an extraordinary rate so that by the end of May 1944, its complement ran to 45 flying groups operating some 5,000 aircraft. Initial missions from England consisted of fighter sweeps over troop concentrations and attacks on enemy positions and airfields, primarily on German 15th Army units in the Pas-de-Calais region of France as well as around Normandy and Cotentin Peninsula. On D-Day IX Fighter Command units carried out massive air attacks on German forces in Normandy area with North American P-51 Mustang and Republic P-47 Thunderbolt fighter bombers. Air cover during the morning amphibious assault by Allied forces on the beaches of France was flown by Lockheed P-38 Lightnings.

With the beaches secure, groups began deploying to France on 16 June 1944, ten days after the Normandy invasion by moving P-47 Thunderbolts to a beach-head landing strip. During the Battle of Normandy, its tactical air units then provided the air power for the Allied break-out from the Normandy beachhead in the summer of 1944 during the Battle of Cherbourg, Battle for Caen, and the ultimate breakout from the beachhead, Operation Cobra.

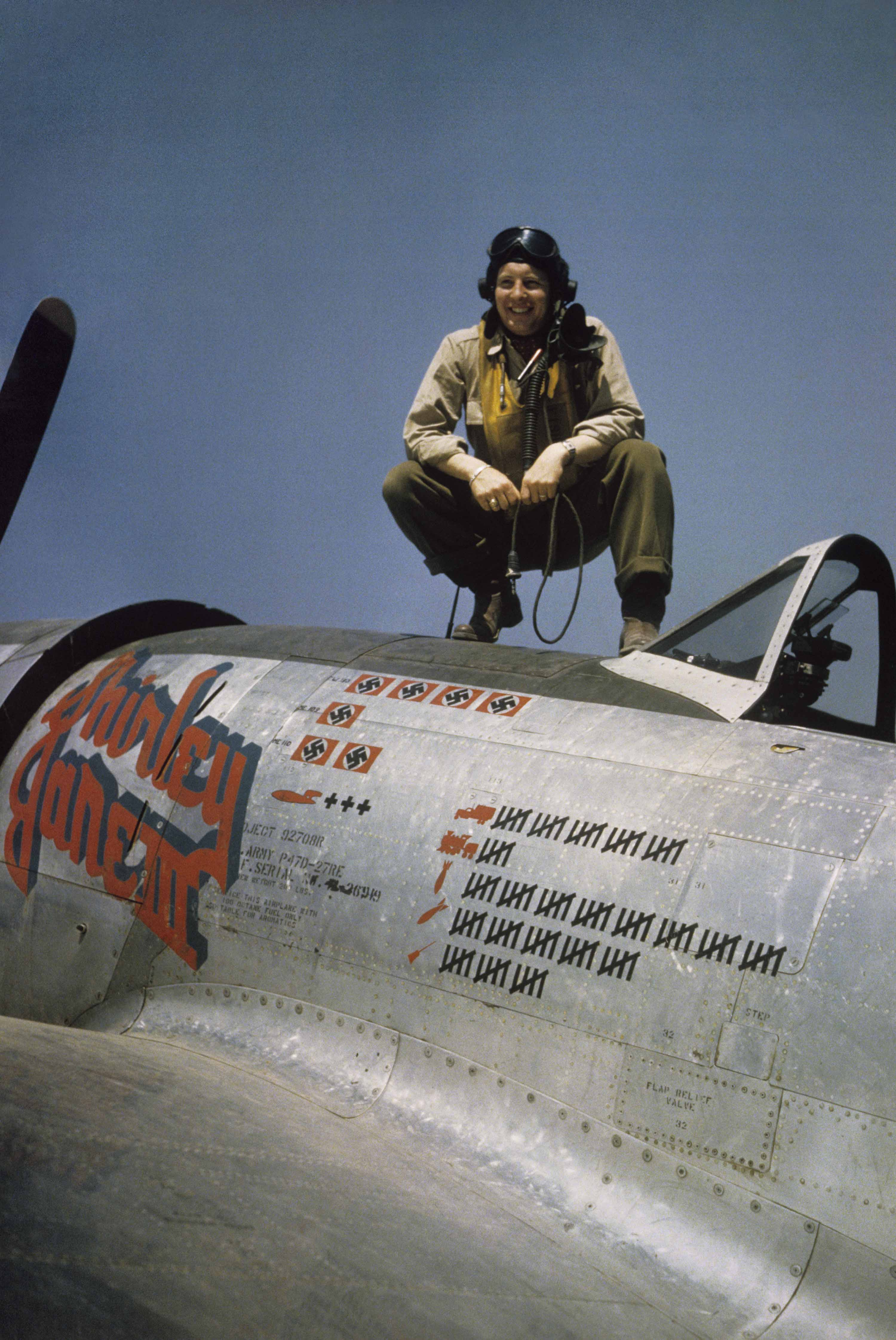
Captain Edwin O. Fisher, 362d Fighter Group, 7 aerial victories; 3 V-1 Flying Bombs; 25 enemy vehicles and 5 locomotives.

By early August most IX Fighter Command groups moved to bases in France and were assigned to missions supporting the Twelfth United States Army Group. The command then reorganized, with units transferred to three tactical air commands and which directly supported United States Army ground units, along with an air defense command to defend Allied-controlled areas.

- XXIX Tactical Air Command supported the Ninth United States Army in the north
- IX Tactical Air Command supported the United States First Army in the center
- XIX Tactical Air Command supported the United States Third Army in the south
- IX Air Defense Command provided air defense of Allied-controlled Western Europe

After its units were reassigned, it remained active until after VE-Day when performed occupation duty in Germany. It was inactivated in November 1945.

In 1947, when the United States Air Force (USAF) became independent, the Army transferred all Army Air Forces, Air Service and Air Corps units (there were a number of Air Corps units that had never been in the Army Air Forces, and a few Air Service units) to the USAF. A year later, the newly forming USAF permanently disbanded the command.

== Lineage ==
- Constituted as the 9th Interceptor Command on 19 January 1942 (Note: Maurer indicates unit was constituted as the "IX" Interceptor Command. However, the unit was constituted and activated with an arabic number in its name. The use of roman numerals to designate Army Air Forces combat commands did not begin until September 1942. "Air Force Historical Research Agency Organizational Reconds: Types of USAF Organizations". Air Force History Index. 9 January 2008.)

Activated on 1 February 1942
Redesignated 9th Fighter Command on 15 May 1942
Redesignated IX Fighter Command c. 18 September 1942
Inactivated on 16 November 1945
Disbanded on 8 October 1948

=== Assignments ===
- Third Air Force, 1 February 1942
- Ninth Air Force, 23 December 1942 – 16 November 1945

=== Components ===
==== North Africa ====
Wings

- 8th Fighter Wing: assigned 24 July – 22 December 1942 (attached to 3d Fighter Command (later III Fighter Command)) 26 July – c. 28 October 1942; attached 22 December 1942 – c. April 1943
- 9th Fighter Wing: December 1942 – 31 March 1943

Groups

- 57th Fighter Group, c. 16 July 1942 – July 1942; 12 November 1942 – 30 August 1943, (attached to Western Desert Air Force, 21 February 1943; Desert Air Force, c. April 1943; 7 South African Air Force (No. 7 (South African) Wing?), 21 May 1943; XII Air Support Command 22 August 1943)
- 79th Fighter Group: 24 February – 22 August 1943 (attached to No. 7 (South African) Wing – c. 2 June 1943; XII Air Support Command – c. 14 June 1943; No. 7 (South African) Wing – c. 21 August 1943)
- 324th Fighter Group, 23 December 1942 – 1 August 1943, (attached to Western Desert Air Force, 23 December 1942; Desert Air Force, c. April–1 August 1943)

==== Western Europe ====
Wings

- 70th Fighter Wing: 29 November 1943 – 3 October 1944
- 71st Fighter Wing: 4 December 1943 – 1 July 1944
- 84th Fighter Wing: 30 April 1944 – 12 August 1944
- 100th Fighter Wing: 27 November – 12 December 1943; 4 January − 1 February 1944; 1 March − 15 April 1944 (remained under operational control until 31 July 1944)
- 303d Fighter Wing: 8 March–1 November 1944

Groups

- 67th Tactical Reconnaissance Group: November 1943 – February 1944
- 354th Fighter Group: c. 3 November 1943 – 27 November 1943
- 358th Fighter Group: 20 October 1943 – 1 August 1944 (attached to VIII Fighter Command)
- 363d Fighter Group (later 363d Reconnaissance Group), 30 December 1943 – February 1944; 1 December 1944 – 18 May 1945 (Attached to XXIX Tactical Air Command (Provisional))
- 366th Fighter Group: 28 January – 28 June 1945 (attached to XXIX Tactical Air Command (Provisional) until 21 June 1945)
- 368th Fighter Group: 13 January–1 August 1944
- 370th Fighter Group: 12 February–1 August 1944
- 371st Fighter Group: 4 April–1 August 1944
- 404th Fighter Group: 4 April–1 August 1944
- 405th Fighter-Bomber Group (later 405th Fighter Group): 6 March – March 1944; 8 February − February 1945 (attached to XXIX Tactical Air Command (Provisional))
- 406th Fighter Group: 4 April–1 August 1944
- 474th Fighter Group: 12 March–1 August 1944

Squadrons

- 4th Air Support Control Squadron: 19 November – 12 December 1943
- 6th Air Support Communications Squadron (later 6th Tactical Air Communications Squadron): 30 December 1943 – 31 January 1944; 1 December 1944 – 1 July 1945 (attached to XXIX Tactical Air Command [Provisional])
- 11th Air Support Control Squadron: 11 December 1943 – c. 1 February 1944
- 15th Tactical Reconnaissance Squadron; 30 December 1943 – 4 January 1944
- 125th Liaison Squadron; 1 December 1944 – 20 June 1945 (attached to XIX Tactical Air Command (Provisional), further attached to Twelfth Army Group)
- 153d Liaison Squadron; 12 December 1943 – 14 March 1944 (attached to First Army after 4 February 1944)

=== Stations ===
- New Orleans Army Air Base, Louisiana, 1 February 1942
- Drew Field, Florida, July–October 1942
- RAF Kabrit, Egypt, 31 January 1943
- Mellaha Field, Libya, 10 April–22 September 1943
- RAF Middle Wallop (AAF 449), England, 30 November 1943 – July 1944
- Les Oubeaux, France, c. 2 July 1944
- Canisy, France, c. 12 August 1944
- Charleroi Airfield (A-87), Belgium, September 1944
- Verviers, Belgium, c. 2 October 1944
- Bruhl, Germany, c. 23 March 1945
- Weimar Airfield (R-7), Germany, April 1945
- AAF Station Fritzlar (Y-86), Germany, July 1945
- AAF Station Erlangen, Germany (R-96), September–16 November 1945
