= Richard E. Nugent =

United States Air Force general

Richard Emmel Nugent
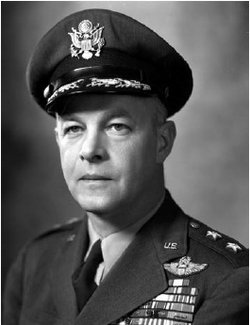
- Born: December 12, 1902; Altoona, Pennsylvania
- Died: November 5, 1979 (aged 76); Patrick Air Force Base, Florida
- Burial place: Fountainhead Memorial Park
- Military career
- Allegiance: United States
- Branch: United States Air Force; United States Army Air Forces; United States Army Air Corps; United States Army
- Service years: 1924–1951
- Rank: Lieutenant general
- Commands: XXIX Tactical Air Command
- Awards: Distinguished Service Medal; Legion of Merit; Bronze Star; Air Medal

Richard Emmel Nugent (December 12, 1902 – November 5, 1979) was a lieutenant general in the United States Air Force who, among other positions, commanded the XXIX Tactical Air Command supporting the Ninth Army during World War II. His first five years of service as a second lieutenant were spent as a tank officer. In 1929 he transferred to the United States Army Air Corps during its five-year expansion program.

Of Nugent's 22-year career in the Air Corps, Army Air Forces and USAF, three were spent in career training and 19 years were in duty positions: four in operational units and commands, and 15 years in staff positions. 11 of those in staff positions were as a personnel specialist, and nearly ten in the Office of Chief of the Air Corps, the General Staff Corps, or Headquarters USAF.

While a major general in the Air Force Office of Personnel, Nugent was involved in the preparatory work, and instrumental in the creation and implementation of the plan, in integrating the Air Force in 1949 and 1950.

== Biography ==
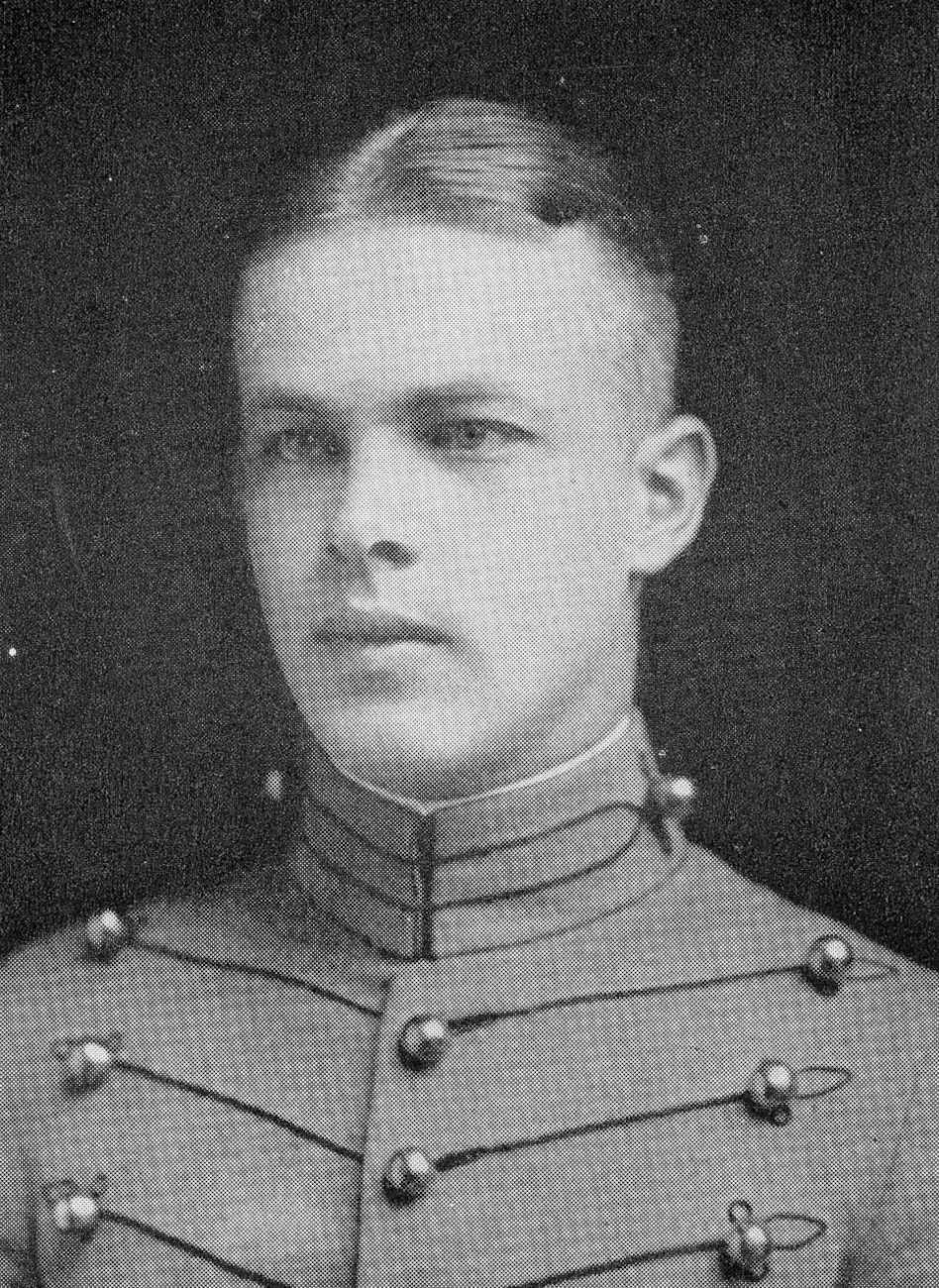
At West Point in 1924

Born in Altoona, Pennsylvania, he graduated from the United States Military Academy on June 12, 1924, and was commissioned as a second lieutenant in the infantry. After attending Tank School in 1925 he served in both the 17th Tank Battalion and on temporary duty with the school. From September 1, 1927, to February 25, 1929, he was stationed with the automotive division of the Ordnance Department at the Aberdeen Proving Ground, then was sent to Brooks Field, Texas, in March 1929 for primary flying school to obtain the rating required for permanent assignment to the Air Corps. He received his pilot's rating and commission of first lieutenant in the Air Corps on March 24, 1930.

In the Air Corps, 1st Lt. Nugent was posted to France Field, Panama Canal Zone, for flying duties with the 25th Bombardment Squadron, 7th Observation Squadron, and 44th Observation Squadron, all of the 6th Composite Group, between September 1930 and March 1932. He then had post duties, primarily as adjutant or operations officer, first at France Field until October 1932, then at Langley Field, Virginia, to August 1937. He served temporary duty as Adjutant, Eastern Zone of the Army Air Corps Mail Operation at Floyd Bennett and Mitchel Fields.

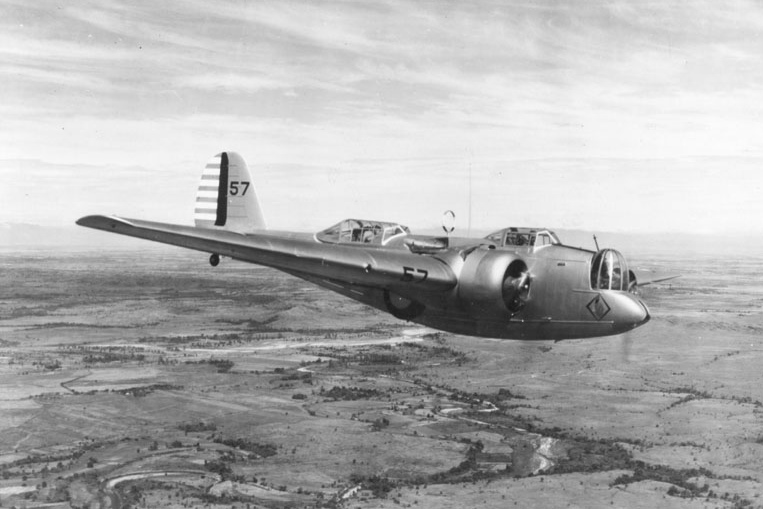
Martin B-10

In September 1935 Nugent returned to Langley, where he was made a flight commander in the 96th Bombardment Squadron, 2nd Bombardment Group until July 1936. Nugent led a flight of three Martin B-10s on an instrument flight from Langley to Allegan, Michigan, for which he and his crews won the 1936 Mackay Trophy. From 1936 to 1937 Nugent returned to staff positions as adjutant for the 2nd Wing, Langley Field, and the 2nd Bomb Group.

He entered the Air Corps Tactical School in September 1937. After completion of Command and General Staff College in 1939, he was assigned to the Personnel Division, Office of Chief of Air Corps, beginning in July 1939, where he remained until March 1942. He rose from captain to colonel in less than three years while with the Personnel Division. From January to April 1941 he served as a special observer at the American Embassy in London, England, with temporary duty as Assistant Military Attaché for Air.

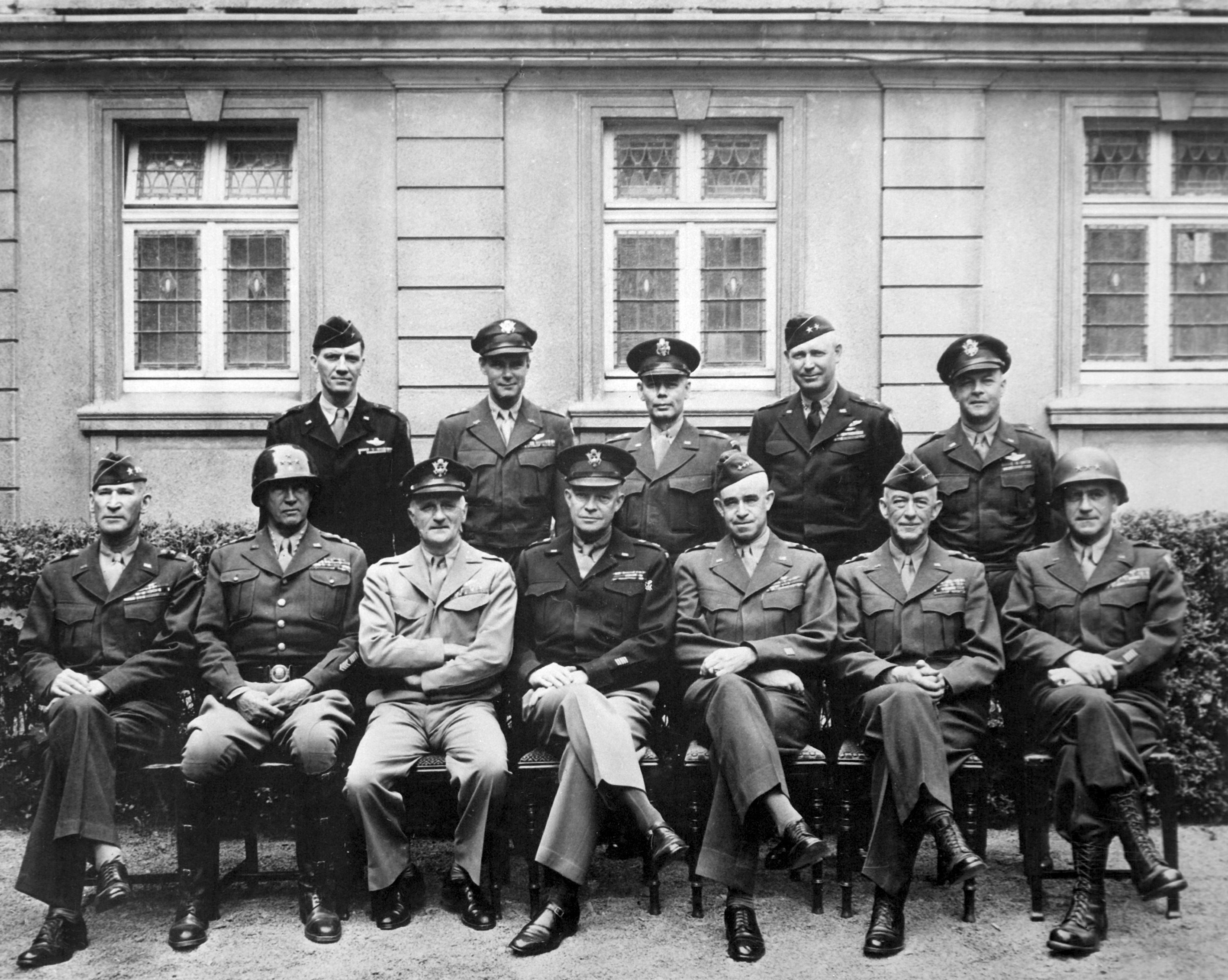
SHAEF and 12th Army Group commanding generals in Northwest Europe, April 1945. Nugent is back row, right.

Nugent was assigned a staff officer to the War Department General Staff on March 10, 1942 (the day after the Army Air Forces became an autonomous component of the Army of the United States), serving in the Office of the Chief of Staff, until April 23, 1943. He was then assigned concurrently as Chief of Staff, Eastern Defense Command and First Air Force, and promoted to brigadier general on June 30, 1943. Nugent briefly commanded the Philadelphia Fighter Wing, from October 18 to November 1, 1943, when he was transferred to the headquarters of the Ninth Air Force in England. There he served as Assistant Deputy and Deputy Chief of Staff for Operations until September 12, 1944, with concurrent duty between July and September 1944 as head of the United States component of the Allied Expeditionary Air Force.

On September 15, 1944, the XXIX Tactical Air Command was activated in France with Nugent in command, where he remained until the end of the war. Republic P-47 Thunderbolts of the six groups of his command provided air support to the United States Ninth Army From October 3, 1944, to May 8, 1945. After V-E Day, Nugent served briefly at the Air Force Personnel Distribution Command at Louisville, Kentucky, then as military attaché to Brazil from December 1945 to July 1947.

=== United States Air Force ===
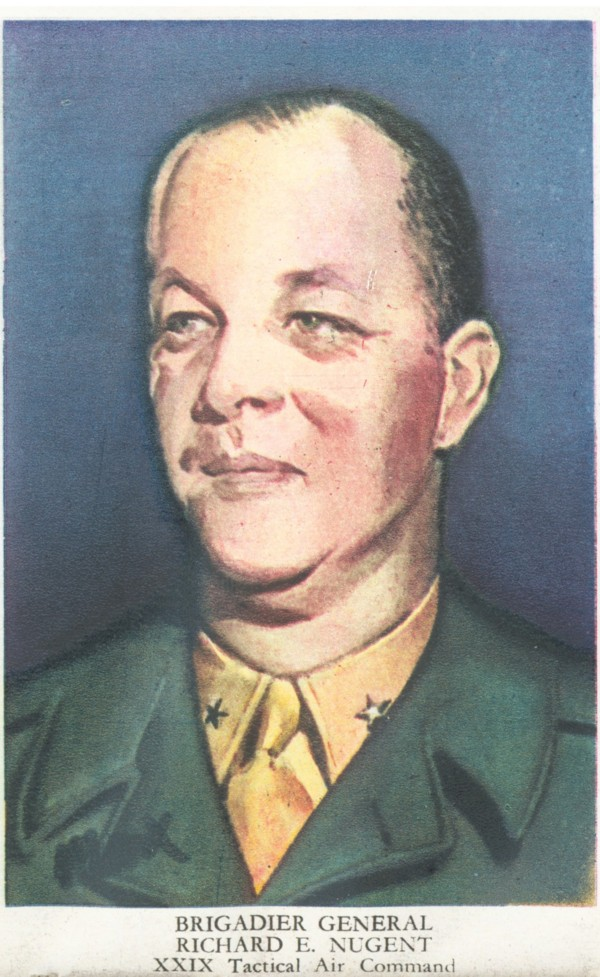
Watercolor portrait of Brigadier General Richard E. Nugent, 9th Air Force, United States Army Air Force 1945

After the creation of the United States Air Force, Nugent served in several general officer positions in the Air Force Office of Personnel, Headquarters USAF, still in the temporary rank of brigadier general. During this period he was promoted to permanent brigadier general in February 1948, and immediately appointed to temporary major general, with dates of rank retroactive to June 30, 1943, and October 14, 1947, respectively. He received a permanent promotion to major general in January 1950, and to the temporary rank of lieutenant general on April 11, 1951. Nugent held a number of positions in AFOP:

Chief of the Civilian Personnel Division (1947),
Assistant Deputy Chief of Staff for Personnel (1947),
Director of Personnel Planning (1948),
Assistant Deputy Chief of Staff for Personnel (1949),
Acting Deputy Chief of Staff for Personnel (1950), and
Deputy Chief of Staff for Personnel (1951).

He retired August 31, 1951, with a line-of-duty disability, in the grade of lieutenant general.

He died at the Patrick Air Force Base hospital on November 5, 1979, and was buried at Fountainhead Memorial Park in Palm Bay, Florida.

== Racial integration of the Air Force ==
In April 1948, while Director of Civilian Personnel, Nugent was tasked by his superior, DCS for Personnel Lt. Gen. Idwal H. Edwards, to chair a study group to re-examine the racial policies of the Air Force. At that time, black Americans were 7% of Air Force enlisted personnel and only .06% of Air Force officers, in completely segregated units, and the new Air Force was under pressure from civil rights organizations to lead the way to integration. Nugent, Evans and Lt. Col. Jack F. Marr were instrumental in creating the racial integration plan for the USAF, announced publicly in June 1948, antedating President Harry S Truman's Executive Order 9981 on July 26, 1948, to integrate the armed forces. The Air Force's plan was submitted to Secretary of the Air Force Stuart Symington in January 1949, and implementation began May 11.

Although Edwards, Nugent, and Marr had all recommended full integration, reasoning that it was not only socially just but that segregation was inefficient and could never be made efficient, the Air Force adopted an incremental integration plan modeled on that of the U.S. Navy, which already had an official racial equality policy formulated by Navy Secretary James Forrestal during World War II. The Navy's racial problem stemmed from its limited compliance with its own policy, caused by diverting 62% of its blacks into the Steward's Branch, but where black sailors served in the fleet, complete integration within units, including living quarters, had already taken place. The numbers, however, were very small. Even so, Edwards and the civilian leadership of the Air Force announced that Air Force policy unequivocally endorsed Truman's order and demanded "ungrudging compliance" with it. Edwards made clear to local commanders that they would be held personally and officially responsible for the smooth implementation of the Air Force plan.

As a result, what was perceived as a limited plan went swiftly forward towards full integration. The effectiveness of the change is noted by the reports of the black-owned Pittsburgh Courier, which was wholly skeptical of the Air Force's sincerity in a May 21 story, yet just five months later prematurely announced the end of segregation in the service in bold headlines. By the end of the first year of implementation, in May 1950, only 24 of the original 106 black units remained, with the definition of a "Negro unit" being one with more than 50% black representation. Integration of quarters and other facilities in integrated units was almost immediate and total. At the end of 1950 only nine black units (all service units) remained and 95% of black airmen served in integrated units.

By June 1952, members of the last black unit, a 98-man service unit with 25 whites, had been distributed throughout the Air Force, while the Navy had made only a "token" transition that would continue for another ten years. Compliance by the Army had hardly begun because of strong internal resistance.

== Awards and decorations ==
SOURCE: Biographical Data on Air Force General Officers, 1917-1952, Volume 2 - L thru Z

Command pilot
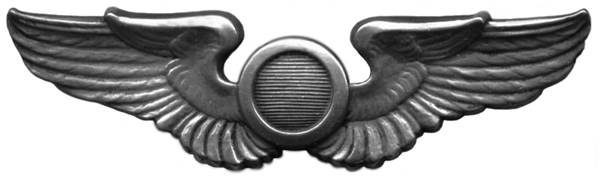
Combat Observer
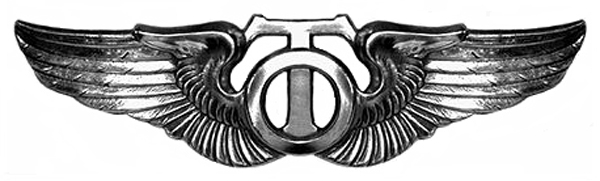
Technical Observer

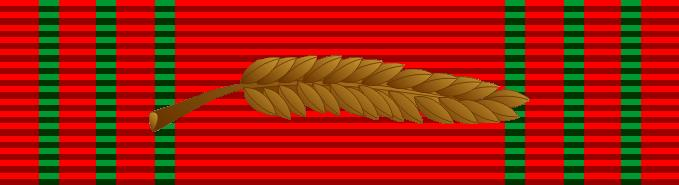
Distinguished Service Medal
Legion of Merit
Bronze Star Medal
Air Medal
American Defense Service Medal
American Campaign Medal
European-African-Middle Eastern Campaign Medal
World War II Victory Medal
Commander of the Order of the British Empire
Legion of Honor (France)
Croix de Guerre with Palm (France)
Commander, Order of Leopold (Belgium)
Croix de Guerre with palm (Belgium)
Order of Adolphe of Nassau (Luxembourg)
Croix de Guerre (Luxembourg)
Order of Alexander Nevsky (Union of Soviet Socialist Republics)
Order of Military Merit (Brazil)
