= XXIX Tactical Air Command (Provisional) =

United States Army Air Forces unit

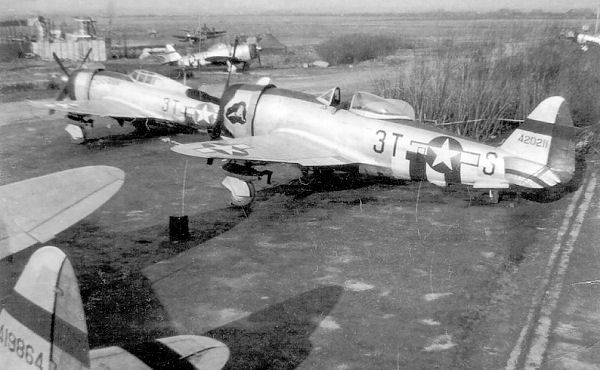
- Republic P-47Ds of the 22d Fighter Squadron, 36th Fighter Group
- Active: 1944-1945
- Country: United States
- Branch: United States Army Air Forces
- Role: Command of ground support units
- Part of: Ninth Air Force
- Engagements: European Theater of Operations 35
- Decorations: Belgian Fourragère

Commanders
- Notable commanders: Richard E. Nugent

The XXIX Tactical Air Command (Provisional) was a provisional United States Army Air Forces unit, primarily formed from units of IX Fighter Command. Its last assignment was with Ninth Air Force at Weimar, Germany, where it was inactivated on 25 October 1945. The command was formed as a counterpart to IX Tactical Air Command and XIX Tactical Air Command to support the United States Ninth Army throughout its easterly advance from its formation on 15 September 1944, until VE-Day. Following the end of the war, the unit was converted from a provisional unit to a regular unit.

== History ==
The unit was formed in France in the fall of 1944 as XXIX Tactical Air Command (Provisional), drawing its cadre from the 84th and 303d Fighter Wings. The two wings served as task force headquarters for the command, with groups and squadrons attached to them as needed. The command's commanding general throughout its existence was Brigadier General Richard E. Nugent

The primary mission of the command was to provide tactical close air support of the United States Ninth Army ground forces to interdict concentration of enemy forces, attack communications and ammunition dumps, and harass the enemy's retreat as well as providing reconnaissance to bombing support. It initially attacked enemy forces in occupied France and the Low Countries Targets included bridges, roads, railroads and enemy interceptor aircraft both on the ground as well as in air-to-air combat. The command provided tactical air support in the final reduction of the German forces holding out in the French port of Brest. After the surrender of the town fifteen days later, Ninth Army was sent east to take its place in the line. It came into the line in between Third and First Army.

In November, Ninth Army undertook offensive attacks in the Roer River sector to the left flank of 12th Army Group. On 16 December the enemy opened the last great offensive of the war, the Battle of the Bulge. During the fierce combat, the XXIX attacked enemy targets in the Northern Rhineland during the Rhineland Campaign and supported Operation Grenade, which was the southern prong of a pincer attack coordinated with Canadian First Army's Operation Veritable. These operations had the objective of closing the front up to the Rhine River. By 10 March, the Rhine had been reached in all sectors of Ninth Army's front, and after 20 March that Ninth Army units first crossed the Rhine itself.

XXIX Tactical Air Command attacked ground targets in the Ruhr, providing air support as Allied ground forces encircled enemy forces in the Ruhr pocket, essentially ending organized enemy resistance in Western Germany. Ninth Army halted its advance at the Elbe River in late April 1945, the Command engaging targets of opportunity in enemy-controlled areas until combat was ended in May 1945. The command was cited in the Order of the Day of the Belgian Army for the periods 1 October 1944 – 17 December 1944 and 18 December 1944 – 15 January 1945, for which it was awarded the Belgian Fourragère.

The unit remained in Europe after the war as part of United States Air Forces in Europe, performing occupation duty and the destruction or shipment to the United States of captured enemy combat equipment. It was demobilized in Germany and the organization was inactivated on 20 November 1945.

== Lineage ==
- Designated as the XXIX Tactical Air Command (Provisional) and organized on 15 September 1944

Redesignated XXIX Tactical Air Command and converted to regular status on 8 June 1945
Inactivated 25 October 1945
Disbanded on 8 October 1948

=== Assignments ===
- Ninth Air Force, attached 15 September 1944, assigned 1 July 1945 – 3 October 1945

=== Components ===
Wings

- 84th Fighter Wing: c. 17 September 1944 – 12 August 1945
- 303d Fighter Wing: 15 December 1944 – 12 August 1945

Groups

- 36th Fighter Group: (attached) 1 October 1944 – 28 January 1945
- 55th Fighter Group: 20 July – 6 August 1945
- 355th Fighter Group: 18 July – c. 10 August 1945
- 363d Tactical Reconnaissance Group: assigned 1 October 1944, attached 1 December 1944 – 18 May 1945
- 366th Fighter Group: assigned 1 October 1944 – 22 October 1944; attached 28 January – 21 June 1945
- 370th Fighter Group: 1 February 1945 – September 1945
- 404th Fighter Group: 26 October 1944 – 16 January 1945
- 405th Fighter Group, attached c. 9 February 1945 - 1945
- 406th Fighter Group: 8 February – 25 October 1945

Squadrons

- 6th Tactical Air Communications Squadron: assigned 15 September 1944; attached 1 December 1944; assigned 1 July – August 1945
- 18th Tactical Air Communications Squadron: 3 July – c. 24 August 1945
- 33d Photographic Reconnaissance Squadron: 7–30 October 1944 (attached to 67th Tactical Reconnaissance Group)
- 39th Photographic Reconnaissance Squadron: flight attached 6 January – 10 March 1945
- 125th Liaison Squadron: attached 15 November 1944 – 8 June 1945 (further attached to Twelfth Army Group

Other

- 555th Signal Aircraft Warning Battalion, 19 July – 6 August 1945
- 9th Photographic Laboratory Section (later 9th Photographic Technical Unit): attached 5 November 1944 – 18 May 1945

=== Stations ===
- Vermand, France, 15 September 1944
- Arlon, Belgium, c. 3 October 1944
- Maastricht, Netherlands, c. 22 October 1944
- Mönchen Gladbach Airfield (Y-56), 8 March 1945
- Haltern, Germany, 3 April 1945
- Gutersloh, Germany, 18 Apr 1945
- Brunswick-Waggum Airfield, (R-37), Germany, 22 April 1945 – 1945
- AAF Station Fürstenfeldbruck, Germany, July 1945
