= Ninth Air Force =

US Air Force numbered air force

Ninth Air Force (Air Forces Central)
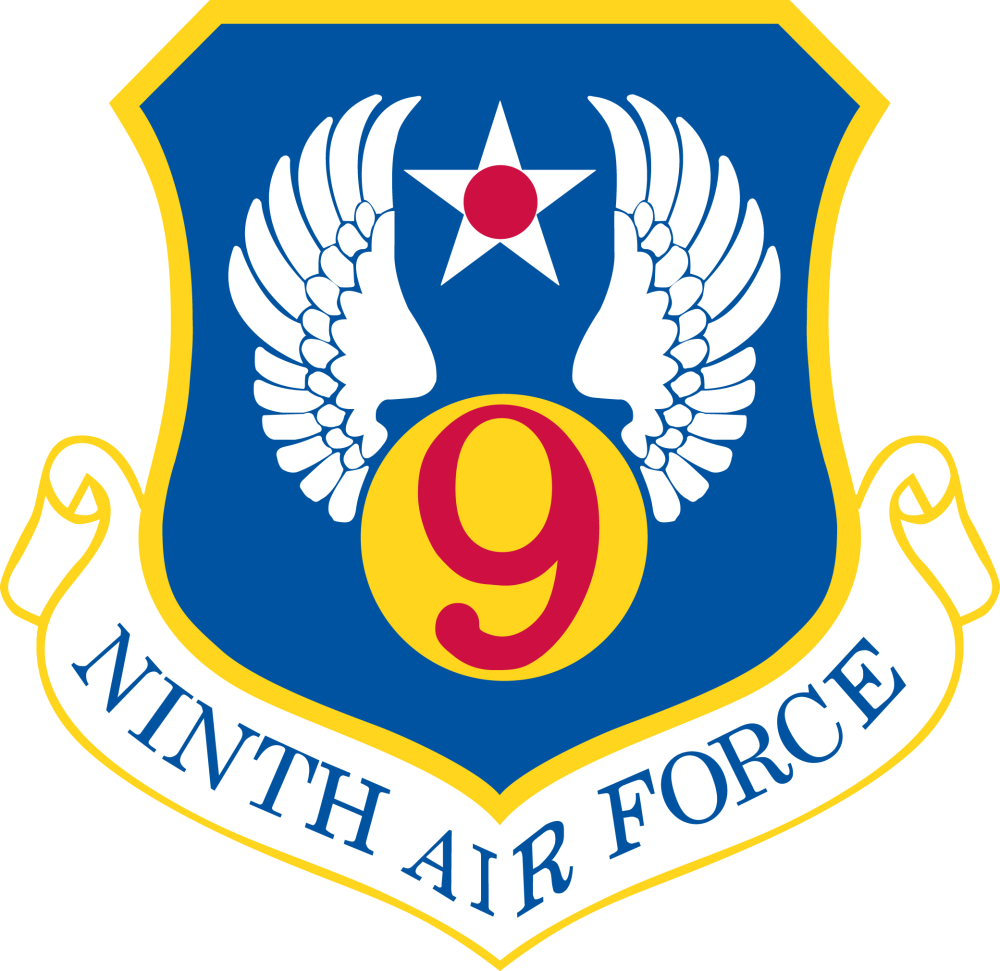
- Shield of the Ninth Air Force (Air Forces Central)
- Active: 20 August 2020 – present (as Ninth Air Force (Air Forces Central)); 5 August 2009 – 20 August 2020 (as United States Air Forces Central Command); 1 March 2008 – 5 August 2009 (Ninth Air Force (Air Forces Central)); 26 June 1951 – 1 March 2008 (as Ninth Air Force); 1 August 1950 – 26 June 1951 (as Ninth Air Force (Tactical)); 28 March 1946 - 1 August 1950; 18 September 1942 - 2 December 1945 as Ninth Air Force); 8 April 1942 – 18 September 1942 (as 9 Air Force); 21 August 1941 – 8 April 1942 (as 5 Air Support Command) (85 years, 1 month)
- Country: United States
- Branch: United States Air Force (26 September 1947 – present); United States Army ( Army Air Forces; 8 April 1942 – 26 September 1947)
- Type: Named Air Force
- Role: Provides combat-ready air forces and serves as the air component to U.S. Central Command
- Part of: Air Combat Command; United States Central Command
- Headquarters: Shaw Air Force Base, South Carolina, U.S.
- Engagements: See list: World War II - American Theater World War II - European-African-Middle Eastern Theater; Egypt-Libya; Tunisia; Sicily; Normandy; Northern France; Rhineland; Ardennes-Alsace; Central Europe Southwest Asia; Defense of Saudi Arabia; Liberation and Defense of Kuwait; Southwest Asia Ceasefire

- Decorations: Air Force Outstanding Unit Award Air Force Organizational Excellence Award
- Website: www.afcent.af.mil

Commanders
- Commander: Lt Gen Daniel T. Lasica
- Deputy Commander: Maj Gen Curtis R. Bass
- Command Chief Master Sergeant: CMSgt Joshua J. Wiener
- Notable commanders: Lewis H. Brereton; Hoyt Vandenberg; Gary L. North; David L. Goldfein; Donavon F. Smith

Insignia
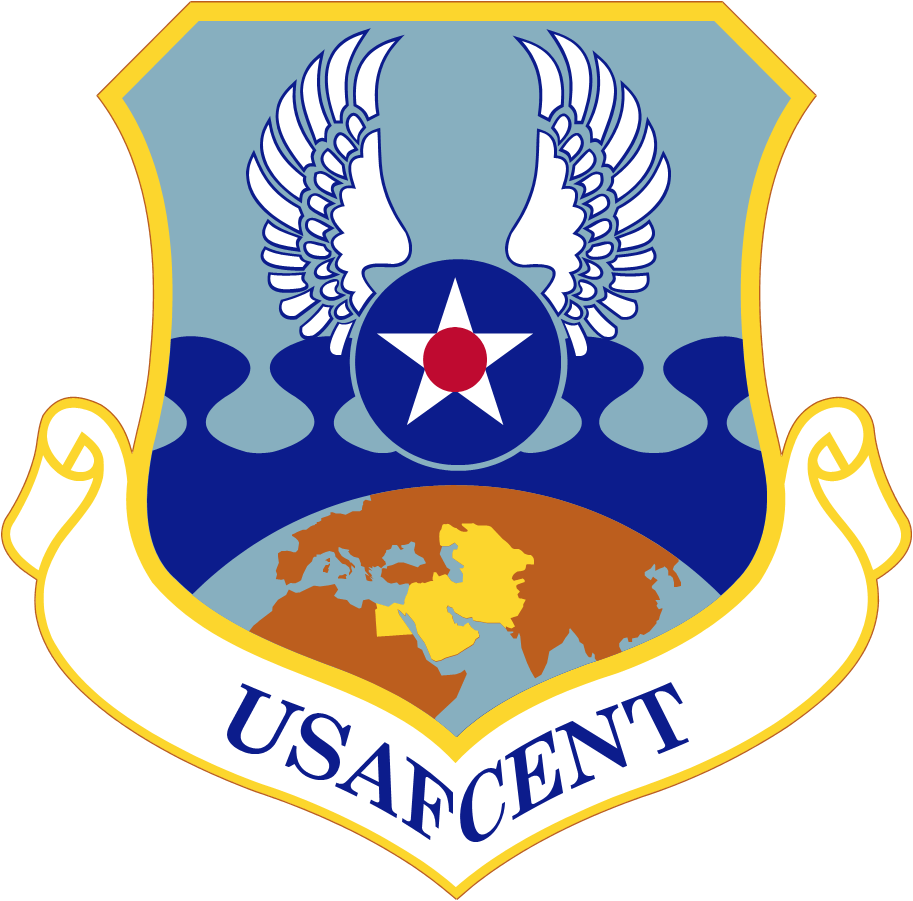
- United States Air Forces Central Command emblem

The Ninth Air Force (Air Forces Central) is a Numbered Air Force of the United States Air Force headquartered at Shaw Air Force Base, South Carolina. It is the Air Force Service Component of United States Central Command (USCENTCOM), a joint Department of Defense combatant command responsible for U.S. security interests in 27 nations that stretch from the Horn of Africa through the Persian Gulf region, into Central Asia.

Activated as 9th Air Force on 8 April 1942, the command fought in World War II both in the Western Desert Campaign in Egypt and Libya and as the tactical fighter component of the United States Strategic Air Forces in Europe, engaging enemy forces in France, the Low Countries and in Nazi Germany. During the Cold War, it was one of two Numbered Air Forces of Tactical Air Command.

Co-designated as United States Central Command Air Forces (CENTAF) on 1 January 1983, on 2009 as part of a complicated transfer of lineage, the lineage and history of the Ninth Air Force was bestowed on USAFCENT, and a new Ninth Air Force, which technically had no previous history, was activated. On 20 August 2020, the 9 AF designation was returned to USAFCENT with the deactivation of the 2009 established 9 AF. It has fought in the 1991 Gulf War, War in Afghanistan (OEF-A, 2001–present), the Iraq War (OIF, 2003–2010), as well as various engagements within USCENTCOM.

== History ==
United States Air Forces Central is the direct descendant organization of Ninth Air Force, established in 1941. AFCENT was formed as the United States Central Command Air Forces (CENTAF) under Tactical Air Command (TAC). CENTAF initially consisted of designated United States Air Force elements of the Rapid Deployment Joint Task Force (RDJTF) which was inactivated and reformed as USCENTCOM in 1983.

On 1 March 2008 USCENTAF was redesignated USAFCENT. It shared its commander with Ninth Air Force until August 2009. Ninth Air Force was redesignated USAFCENT on 5 August 2009. A new Ninth Air Force was established that date for command and control of CONUS-based Air Combat Command units formerly assigned to the previous Ninth Air Force.

=== World War II ===
==== Establishment ====
In the summer of 1941 General Headquarters Air Force (GHQ AF) decided to establish commands to direct its air support mission in each of its numbered air forces, plus one additional command that would report directly to GHQ AF. These commands were manned from inactivating wings, and would initially control only observation squadrons, which would be transferred from the control of the corps and divisions, although they would remain attached to these ground units. GHQ AF organized 5th Air Support Command at Bowman Field, Kentucky in September 1941, drawing its personnel and equipment from the 16th Bombardment Wing, which was simultaneously inactivated. New observation groups were formed, with a cadre drawn from National Guard squadrons that had been mobilized in 1940 and 1941. 5th Air Support Command was redesignated as 9th Air Force in April 1942. It moved to Bolling Field, DC on 22 July and transferred without personnel or equipment to Cairo, Egypt on 12 November 1942.

==== Operations in Western Desert Campaign, 1942–1943 ====
USAAF Air Forces in the European-African-Middle Eastern Theater, 1942

In June 1942, the German Afrika Korps advance in North Africa forced the British Eighth Army to retreat towards Egypt putting British Middle East Command at risk. The United States Army Air Forces (USAAF) had already planned for a buildup of American air power in the Middle East in January 1942 in response to a request from the British Chief of the Air Staff, but the first units arrived unexpectedly on 12 June 1942. Col. Harry A. Halverson, commanding twenty-three B-24D Liberator heavy bombers and a hand-picked crews (as a force called HALPRO – from "Halverson Project") was stopped at RAF Lydda en route to China to carry out attacks on Japan from airfields in China, but after the fall of Rangoon the Burma Road was cut, so the detachment could not be logistically supported in China. HALPRO was quickly diverted from its original mission to a new one—interdictory raids from airfields in Egypt against shipping and North African ports supporting Axis operations.

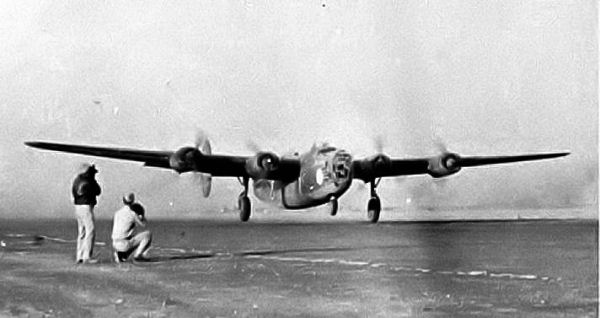
B-24 Liberator of the 376th Bomb Group taking off from a Libyan base, 1943

On 28 June 1942, Major General Lewis H. Brereton arrived at Cairo to command the U.S. Army Middle East Air Force (USAMEAF), which was activated immediately. USAMEAF comprised the former Halverson Project now the 1st Provisional Bombardment Group, Brereton's detachment (9th Bombardment Squadron (Heavy) and other personnel which Brereton brought from India), and the Air Section of the U.S. Military North African Mission. Several USAAF units were sent to join USAMEAF during next weeks in the destruction of Rommel's Afrika Korps by support to ground troops and secure sea and air communications in the Mediterranean.

In September 1942, RAF Middle East Command's Senior Air Staff Officer, Air Commodore (Note: Temporary Air Vice Marshal from December 1942) Philip. Wigglesworth was authorized by Air Chief Marshal Sir Arthur Tedder to select targets for all U.S. heavy bombers.

"A development of some importance in the career of USAMEAF manifested itself administratively on 12 October (1942) when orders were cut assigning nine officers to the IX Bomber Command, which organization was then and for a month afterwards unofficial. This command had its roots in a discussion on 5 September between Tedder's senior air staff officer, Air Vice Marshal H. E. P. Wigglesworth, and G-3 officers of USAMEAF, during which Wigglesworth asserted that he had control, delegated by Tedder, over the target selection for the U.S. heavy bombers. Col. Patrick W. Timberlake, G-3 of Brereton's staff, took a serious view of this assertion in that it violated the Arnold-Portal-Towers agreement that American combat units assigned to theaters of British strategic responsibility were to be organized in "homogeneous American formations" under the "strategic control" of the appropriate British commander in chief. In a memo of 7 September, Timberlake granted that this canon might be justifiably violated in the case of the 12th Bombardment and 57th Fighter Groups, but he could see no reason why operational control of the 1st Provisional and 98th Groups, comprising four-fifths of the heavy bomber force in the Middle East, should not be vested in American hands. Subsequent negotiations carried the point with the British, who even turned over their 160 Squadron (Liberators) to the operational control of IX Bomber Command. On 12 October a small staff moved into Grey Pillars [RAF headquarters in Garden City, Cairo], and thenceforth USAMEAF's bombers operated only under the "strategic" direction of the British. Timberlake headed the organization, with Kalberer as his A-3 and Lt. Col. Donald M. Keiser as his chief of staff."—The Army Air Forces in World War II

In the Second Battle of El Alamein under General Bernard Montgomery attacks by British troops depleted the Axis tanks and Field Marshal Erwin Rommel began the withdrawal from Egypti.

Ninth Air Force had been first constituted as V Air Support Command, part of Air Force Combat Command, at Bowman Field, Kentucky on 11 September 1941. Its responsibility was to direct and coordinate the training activities of National Guard observation squadrons inducted into federal service with those of light bomber units training with the Army Ground Forces. However a lack of unity of command in the organizational set-up led to an early discontinuation of the "air support commands" and V Air Support Command was redesignated as Ninth Air Force in April 1942.

It moved to Bolling Field, Washington, D.C., on 22 July and transferred without personnel or equipment to Cairo, Egypt on 12 November 1942. The Ninth Air Force mission comprised: (1) Gain air superiority; (2) Deny the enemy the ability to replenish or replace losses, and (3) Offer ground forces close support in North-East Africa. On 12 November 1942, the US Army Middle East Air Force was dissolved and replaced by HQ Ninth Air Force, commanded by Lieutenant General Lewis H. Brereton. At that time, the Ninth Air Force consisted of:

- IX Bomber Command (Brigadier General Patrick W Timberlake) at Ismailia, Egypt,
- IX Fighter Command (Colonel John C Kilborn) en route to Egypt,
- IX Air Service Command (Brigadier General Elmer E Adler).

By the end of 1942 a total of 370 aircraft had been ferried to the Ninth Air Force. While the great majority were P-40s, Consolidated B-24 Liberators (The original Halverson Detachment (HALPRO), 98th Bombardment Group, 376th Bombardment Group, and RAF units), and B-25 Mitchells (12th) and 340th Bombardment Groups), there were also more than 50 twin-engine transports (316th Troop Carrier Group), which made it possible to build an effective local air transport service. Ninth Air Force P-40F fighters (57th, 79th, and 324th Fighter Groups) supported the British Eighth Army's drive across Egypt and Libya, escorting bombers and flying strafing and dive-bombing missions against airfields, communications, and troop concentrations. Other targets attacked were shipping and harbor installations in Libya, Tunisia, Sicily, Italy, Crete, and Greece to cut enemy supply lines to Africa. The Palm Sunday Massacre was one noteworthy mission by the P-40 and Spitfire groups.

After an Allied air forces command reorganisation effective 18 February 1943, the Ninth Air Force began to report to RAF Middle East Command (RAFME) under Air Chief Marshal Sir Sholto Douglas. Additionally, the Ninth's 57th, 79th, and 324th Fighter Groups and its 12th and 340th Bombardment Groups were transferred to the operational control of the Northwest African Tactical Air Force (NATAF) under the command of Air Vice-Marshal Sir Arthur Coningham. The Ninth's 316th Troop Carrier Group flew its missions with the Northwest African Troop Carrier Command (NATCC).

In February 1943, after the Afrika Korps had been driven into Tunisia, the Germans took the offensive and pushed through the Kasserine Pass before being stopped with the help of both Ninth and Twelfth Air Force units in the battle. The Allies drove the enemy back into a pocket around Bizerte and Tunis, where Axis forces surrendered in May. Thus, Tunisia became available for launching attacks on Pantelleria (Operation Corkscrew), Sicily (Operation Husky), and mainland Italy.

At the time of Operation Husky, the invasion of Sicily on 10 July 1943, Ninth Air Force Headquarters was still based at Cairo in Egypt while the Headquarters of Ninth Fighter Command and IX Bomber Command were stationed at Tripoli and Benghazi, Libya, respectively. During this critical period of World War II when the Allied forces finally left North Africa for Europe, the groups of the Ninth Air Force consisted of:

- 12th Bombardment Group at Sfax el Mau, Tunisia with B-25 Mitchells (81st, 82d, 83d, & 434th Bombardment Squadrons)
- 340th Bombardment Group at Sfax South, Tunisia with B-25 Mitchells (486th, 487th, 488th, & 489th Bombardment Squadrons)
- 57th Fighter Group at Hani Main, Tunisia with P-40F Warhawks (64th, 65th, & 66th Fighter Squadrons)
- 79th Fighter Group at Causeway Landing Ground, Tunisia with P-40F Warhawks (85th, 86th, & 87th Fighter Squadrons)
- 324th Fighter Group with P-40F Warhawks (314th Squadron at Hani Main, 315th Squadron at Kabrit, Egypt, & 316th Squadron at Causeway).
- 98th Bombardment Group with B-24D Liberators (343rd & 344th Squadrons at Lete, Libya; 345th & 415th Squadrons at Benina, Libya)
- 376th Bombardment Group at Berka, Tunisia with B-24D Liberators (512th, 513th, 514th, & 515th Bombardment Squadrons)
- 316th Troop Carrier Group at Deversoir, Egypt with C-47s, C-53s and DC3s (36th, 37th, & 44th Squadrons at Deversoir, Egypt; 45th Squadron at Castel Benito, Libya).

During most of 1943, the Ninth Air Force was officially assigned to RAF Middle East Command of the Mediterranean Air Command. However, the Ninth's 12th and 340th Bombardment Groups were assigned to the Tactical Bomber Force, the 57th and 79th Fighter Groups were assigned to the Desert Air Force, and the 324th Fighter Group was surprisingly assigned to XII Air Support Command. The Tactical Bomber Force under Air Commodore Laurence Sinclair, the Desert Air Force under Air Vice Marshal Harry Broadhurst, and XII Air Support Command under Major General Edwin House were sub-commands of the Northwest African Tactical Air Force (NATAF) under Air Marshal Sir Arthur Coningham. NATAF was one of the three major sub-commands of the Northwest African Air Forces (NAAF) under Lieutenant General Carl Spaatz. NATAF, Northwest African Strategic Air Force (NASAF) and Northwest African Coastal Air Force (NACAF), formed the classic tri-force, the basis for the creation of NAAF in February 1943.

Ninth Air Force groups attacked airfields and rail facilities in Sicily and took part in Operation Husky, carried paratroopers, and flew reinforcements to ground units on the island. The heavy bombardment groups (B-24s) of the Ninth also participated in the low-level assault of the oil refineries at Ploesti, Romania on 1 August 1943.

On 22 August 1943 the following groups were transferred from the Ninth Air Force to the Twelfth Air Force:

- 12th Bombardment Group (Medium) at Gerbini, Sicily with B-25s
- 57th Fighter Group on Sicily with P-40s
- 79th Fighter Group on Sicily with P-40s
- 324th Fighter Group at El Haouaria, Tunisia with P-40s and
- 340th Bombardment Group (Medium) at Comiso, Sicily with B-25s

The 316th Troop Carrier Group was operating under Northwest African Troop Carrier Command with C-47 Dakotas and CG4A Waco Gliders.

==== Ninth Air Force 1943 to June 1944 ====
Concurrently with the reassignment of Ninth Air Force formations in the Mediterranean to Twelfth Air Force, plans were afoot in Britain to move Eighth Air Force's medium bomber units to a separate command. This command was offered to Brereton, who accepted, and the force was constituted, also as Ninth Air Force, on 16 October 1943.

During the winter of 1943–1944 Ninth Air Force expanded at an extraordinary rate, so that by the end of May, its complement ran to 45 flying groups operating some 5,000 aircraft. With the necessary ground support units, the total number of personnel assigned to Ninth Air Force would be more than 200,000, a total greater than that of Eighth Air Force.

HQ Ninth Air Force extended IX Bomber Command's choice of targets considerably, although first priority for Operation Pointblank [the Combined Bomber Offensive (CBO) of US and RAF air forces against the Luftwaffe and German aircraft industry] and next priority for Operation Crossbow (codename for operations against German V-weapon sites) targets was maintained. U.S. and British Air Forces aimed to defeat the German Luftwaffe in the air and on the ground, to bring about complete air supremacy prior to the invasion of Normandy. Operational missions involved attacks on rail marshaling yards, railroads, airfields, industrial plants, military installations, and other enemy targets in France, Belgium, and the Netherlands. Other targets were German Atlantic Wall defenses along the English Channel coast of France.

On 4 January 1944 XIX Air Support Command was activated at RAF Middle Wallop to support Patton's Third Army in Europe. In February 1944 the Ninth Air Force underwent a reorganization and several troop carrier groups relocated headquarters. Major General Otto P. Weyland became commanding general of XIX Air Support Command, replacing Major General Elwood R Quesada. The latter assumed dual command of both IX Fighter Command and the IX Air Support Command, which took control of all its fighter and reconnaissance units. HQ IX Air Support Command changed from Aldermaston Court to Middle Wallop.

Major General Paul L. Williams, who had commanded the troop carrier operations in Sicily and Italy, replaced Giles in command of IX Troop Carrier Command. The IX TCC command and staff officers were an excellent mix of combat veterans from those earlier assaults, and a few key officers were held over for continuity. The groups assigned were a mixture of experience, but training would be needed to confront the expected massive movements of troops of the 82nd and 101st Airborne Divisions.

On 18 April 1944, the IX and XIX Air Support Commands were redesignated, respectively, as IX Tactical Air Command and XIX Tactical Air Command.

Between 1 May and the invasion on 6 June, the Ninth flew approximately 35,000 sorties, attacking targets such as airfields, railroad yards, and coastal gun positions. By the end of May 1944, the IX TCC had available 1,207 C-47 Skytrain troop carrier airplanes and was one-third overstrength, creating a strong reserve. Three-quarters of the aircraft were less than one year old on D-Day, and all were in excellent condition. Gliders were incorporated, Over 2,100 CG-4 Waco gliders had been sent to the UK, and after attrition during training operations, 1,118 were available for operations, along with 301 larger Airspeed Horsa gliders received from the British.

=== Order of battle, 6 June 1944 ===
- IX Bomber Command
  - 97th Bombardment Wing (Light)
    - 409th Bombardment Group (A-20)
      - 640th Bombardment Squadron (W5)
      - 641st Bombardment Squadron (7G)
      - 642d Bombardment Squadron (D6)
      - 643d Bombardment Squadron (5I)
    - 410th Bombardment Group (A-20)
      - 644th Bombardment Squadron (5Q)
      - 645th Bombardment Squadron (7X)
      - 646th Bombardment Squadron (8U)
      - 647th Bombardment Squadron (6Q)
    - 416th Bombardment Group (A-20)
      - 668th Bombardment Squadron (5H)
      - 669th Bombardment Squadron (2A)
      - 670th Bombardment Squadron (F6)
      - 671st Bombardment Squadron (5C)
  - 98th Bombardment Wing (Medium)
    - 323d Bombardment Group (B-26)
      - 453d Bombardment Squadron (VT)
      - 454th Bombardment Squadron (RJ)
      - 455th Bombardment Squadron (YU)
      - 456th Bombardment Squadron (WT)
    - 387th Bombardment Group (B-26)
      - 556th Bombardment Squadron (FW)
      - 557th Bombardment Squadron (KS)
      - 558th Bombardment Squadron (KX)
      - 559th Bombardment Squadron (TQ)
    - 394th Bombardment Group (B-26)
      - 584th Bombardment Squadron (K5)
      - 585th Bombardment Squadron (4T)
      - 586th Bombardment Squadron (H9)
      - 587th Bombardment Squadron (5W)
    - 397th Bombardment Group (B-26)
      - 596th Bombardment Squadron (X2)
      - 597th Bombardment Squadron (9F)
      - 598th Bombardment Squadron (U2
      - 599th Bombardment Squadron (6B)
  - 99th Bombardment Wing (Medium)
    - 322d Bombardment Group (B-26)
      - 449th Bombardment Squadron (PN)
      - 450th Bombardment Squadron (ER)
      - 451st Bombardment Squadron (SS)
      - 452nd Bombardment Squadron (DR)
    - 344th Bombardment Group (B-26)
      - 494th Bombardment Squadron (K9)
      - 495th Bombardment Squadron (Y5)
      - 496th Bombardment Squadron (N3)
      - 497th Bombardment Squadron (7L)
      - 1st Pathfinder Squadron (Provisional)
    - 386th Bombardment Group (B-26)
      - 552d Bombardment Squadron (RG)
      - 553d Bombardment Squadron (AN)
      - 554th Bombardment Squadron (RU)
      - 555th Bombardment Squadron (YA)
    - 391st Bombardment Group (B-26)
      - 572d Bombardment Squadron (P2)
      - 573d Bombardment Squadron (T6)
      - 574th Bombardment Squadron (4L)
      - 575th Bombardment Squadron (O8)
- IX Fighter Command
  - IX Tactical Air Command
    - 70th Fighter Wing
      - 48th Fighter Group (P-47)
        - 492d Fighter Squadron (F4)
        - 493d Fighter Squadron (I7)
        - 494th Fighter Squadron (6M)
      - 367th Fighter Group (P-38)
        - 392d Fighter Squadron (H5)
        - 393d Fighter Squadron (8L)
        - 394th Fighter Squadron (4N)
      - 371st Fighter Group (P-47)
        - 404th Fighter Squadron (9Q)
        - 405th Fighter Squadron (8N)
        - 406th Fighter Squadron (4W)
      - 474th Fighter Group (P-38)
        - 428th Fighter Squadron (F5)
        - 429th Fighter Squadron (7Y)
        - 430th Fighter Squadron (K6)
    - 71st Fighter Wing
      - 366th Fighter Group (P-47)
        - 389th Fighter Squadron (A6)
        - 390th Fighter Squadron (B2)
        - 391st Fighter Squadron (A8)
      - 368th Fighter Group (P-47)
        - 359th Fighter Squadron (A7)
        - 396th Fighter Squadron (C2)
        - 397th Fighter Squadron (D3)
      - 370th Fighter Group (P-38)
        - 401st Fighter Squadron (9D)
        - 402nd Fighter Squadron (E6)
        - 485th Fighter Squadron (7F)
    - 84th Fighter Wing
      - 50th Fighter Group (P-47)
        - 10th Fighter Squadron (T5)
        - 81st Fighter Squadron (2N)
        - 313th Fighter Squadron (W3)
      - 365th Fighter Group (P-47)
        - 386th Fighter Squadron (D5)
        - 387th Fighter Squadron (B4)
        - 388th Fighter Squadron (C4)
      - 404th Fighter Group (P-47)
        - 506th Fighter Squadron (4K)
        - 507th Fighter Squadron (Y8)
        - 508th Fighter Squadron (7J)
      - 405th Fighter Group (P-47)
        - 509th Fighter Squadron (G9)
        - 510th Fighter Squadron (2Z)
        - 511th Fighter Squadron (K4)
  - XIX Tactical Air Command
    - 100th Fighter Wing
      - 354th Fighter Group (P-51)
        - 353d Fighter Squadron (FT)
        - 354th Fighter Squadron (GQ)
        - 355th Fighter Squadron (AJ)
      - 358th Fighter Group (P-47)
        - 365th Fighter Squadron (CH)
        - 366th Fighter Squadron (IA)
        - 367th Fighter Squadron (CP)
      - 362d Fighter Group (P-47)
        - 377th Fighter Squadron (E4)
        - 378th Fighter Squadron (G8)
        - 379th Fighter Squadron (B8)
      - 363d Fighter Group (P-51)
        - 380th Fighter Squadron (A9)
        - 381st Fighter Squadron (B3)
        - 382d Fighter Squadron (C3)
    - 303d Fighter Wing
      - 36th Fighter Group (P-47)
        - 22d Fighter Squadron (3T)
        - 23d Fighter Squadron (7U)
        - 53d Fighter Squadron (6V)
      - 373d Fighter Group (P-47)
        - 410th Fighter Squadron (R3)
        - 411th Fighter Squadron (U9)
        - 412th Fighter Squadron (V5)
      - 406th Fighter Group (P-47)
        - 512th Fighter Squadron (L3)
        - 513th Fighter Squadron (4P)
        - 514th Fighter Squadron (O7)
  - 10th Photo Reconnaissance Group (F-3/F-5/F-6)
    - 30th Photographic Reconnaissance Squadron
    - 31st Photographic Reconnaissance Squadron
    - 33d Photographic Reconnaissance Squadron
    - 34th Photographic Reconnaissance Squadron
    - 155th Photographic Reconnaissance Squadron
- IX Troop Carrier Command
  - 1st Pathfinder Group (Provisional)
  - 50th Troop Carrier Wing
    - 439th Troop Carrier Group (C-47/C-53)
      - 91st Troop Carrier Squadron (L4)
      - 92d Troop Carrier Squadron (J8)
      - 93d Troop Carrier Squadron (3B)
      - 94th Troop Carrier Squadron (D8)
    - 440th Troop Carrier Group (C-47/C-53)
      - 95th Troop Carrier Squadron (9X)
      - 96th Troop Carrier Squadron (6Z)
      - 97th Troop Carrier Squadron (W6)
      - 98th Troop Carrier Squadron (8Y)
    - 441st Troop Carrier Group (C-47/C-53)
      - 99th Troop Carrier Squadron (3J)
      - 100th Troop Carrier Squadron (8C)
      - 301st Troop Carrier Squadron (Z4)
      - 302d Troop Carrier Squadron (2L)
    - 442d Troop Carrier Group (C-47/C-53)
      - 303d Troop Carrier Squadron (J7)
      - 304th Troop Carrier Squadron (V4)
      - 305th Troop Carrier Squadron (4J)
      - 306th Troop Carrier Squadron (7H)
  - 52d Troop Carrier Wing
    - 61st Troop Carrier Group (C-47/C-53)
      - 14th Troop Carrier Squadron (3I)
      - 15th Troop Carrier Squadron (Y9)
      - 53d Troop Carrier Squadron (3A)
      - 59th Troop Carrier Squadron (X5)
    - 313th Troop Carrier Group (C-47/C-53)
      - 29th Troop Carrier Squadron (5X)
      - 47th Troop Carrier Squadron (N3)
      - 48th Troop Carrier Squadron (Z7)
      - 49th Troop Carrier Squadron (H2)
    - 314th Troop Carrier Group (C-47/C-53)
      - 32nd Troop Carrier Squadron (S2)
      - 50th Troop Carrier Squadron (2R)
      - 61st Troop Carrier Squadron (Q9)
      - 62d Troop Carrier Squadron (E5)
    - 315th Troop Carrier Group (C-47/C-53)
      - 34th Troop Carrier Squadron (NM)
      - 43d Troop Carrier Squadron (UA)
      - 309th Troop Carrier Squadron (M6)
      - 310th Troop Carrier Squadron (4A)
    - 316th Troop Carrier Group (C-47/C-53)
      - 36th Troop Carrier Squadron (6E)
      - 37th Troop Carrier Squadron (W7)
      - 44th Troop Carrier Squadron (4C)
      - 45th Troop Carrier Squadron (T3)
  - 53d Troop Carrier Wing
    - 434th Troop Carrier Group (C-47/C-53)
      - 71st Troop Carrier Squadron (CJ)
      - 72d Troop Carrier Squadron (CU)
      - 73d Troop Carrier Squadron (CN)
      - 74th Troop Carrier Squadron (ID)
    - 435th Troop Carrier Group (C-47/C-53)
      - 75th Troop Carrier Squadron (SH)
      - 76th Troop Carrier Squadron (CW)
      - 77th Troop Carrier Squadron (IB)
      - 78th Troop Carrier Squadron (CM)
    - 436th Troop Carrier Group (C-47/C-53)
      - 79th Troop Carrier Squadron (S6)
      - 80th Troop Carrier Squadron (7D)
      - 81st Troop Carrier Squadron (U5)
      - 82d Troop Carrier Squadron (3D)
    - 437th Troop Carrier Group (C-47/C-53)
      - 83d Troop Carrier Squadron (T2)
      - 84th Troop Carrier Squadron (Z8)
      - 85th Troop Carrier Squadron (9O)
      - 86th Troop Carrier Squadron (5K)
    - 438th Troop Carrier Group (C-47/C-53)
      - 87th Troop Carrier Squadron (3X)
      - 88th Troop Carrier Squadron (M2)
      - 89th Troop Carrier Squadron (4U)
      - 90th Troop Carrier Squadron (Q7)
- IX Air Force Service Command
  - 1st Advanced Air Depot Area
    - 1st Tactical Air Depot
    - 2d Tactical Air Depot
    - 3d Tactical Air Depot
  - 2d Advanced Air Depot Area
    - 4th Tactical Air Depot
    - 5th Tactical Air Depot
    - 6th Tactical Air Depot
  - 1585th Quartermaster Truck Regiment
  - 31st Transport Group
  - IX Air Force Intransit Depot Group
  - 13th Replacement Control Depot
  - 20th Replacement Control Depot
  - Signal Battalion (HC)
- IX Engineer Command
  - 922d Engineer Aviation Regiment
  - 924th Engineer Aviation Regiment
  - 925th Engineer Aviation Regiment
  - 926th Engineer Aviation Regiment
- IX Air Defense Command
  - 1/8 Antiaircraft Group
  - 51st Antiaircraft Artillery Brigade
  - 52d Antiaircraft Artillery Brigade

==== Operations in Europe 1944–1945 ====
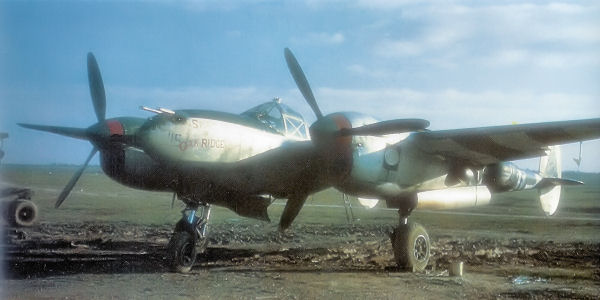
P-38 of the 370th Fighter Group on a wartime advanced landing strip

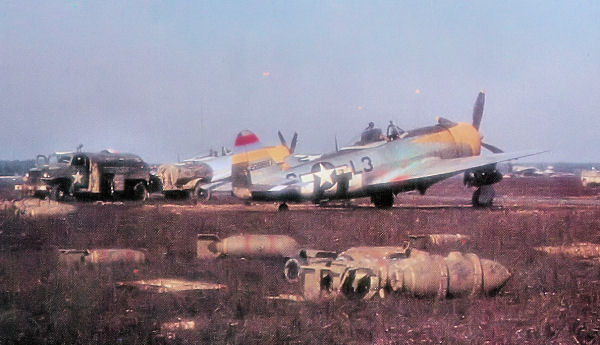
P-47D of the 406th Fighter Group on a wartime advanced landing strip

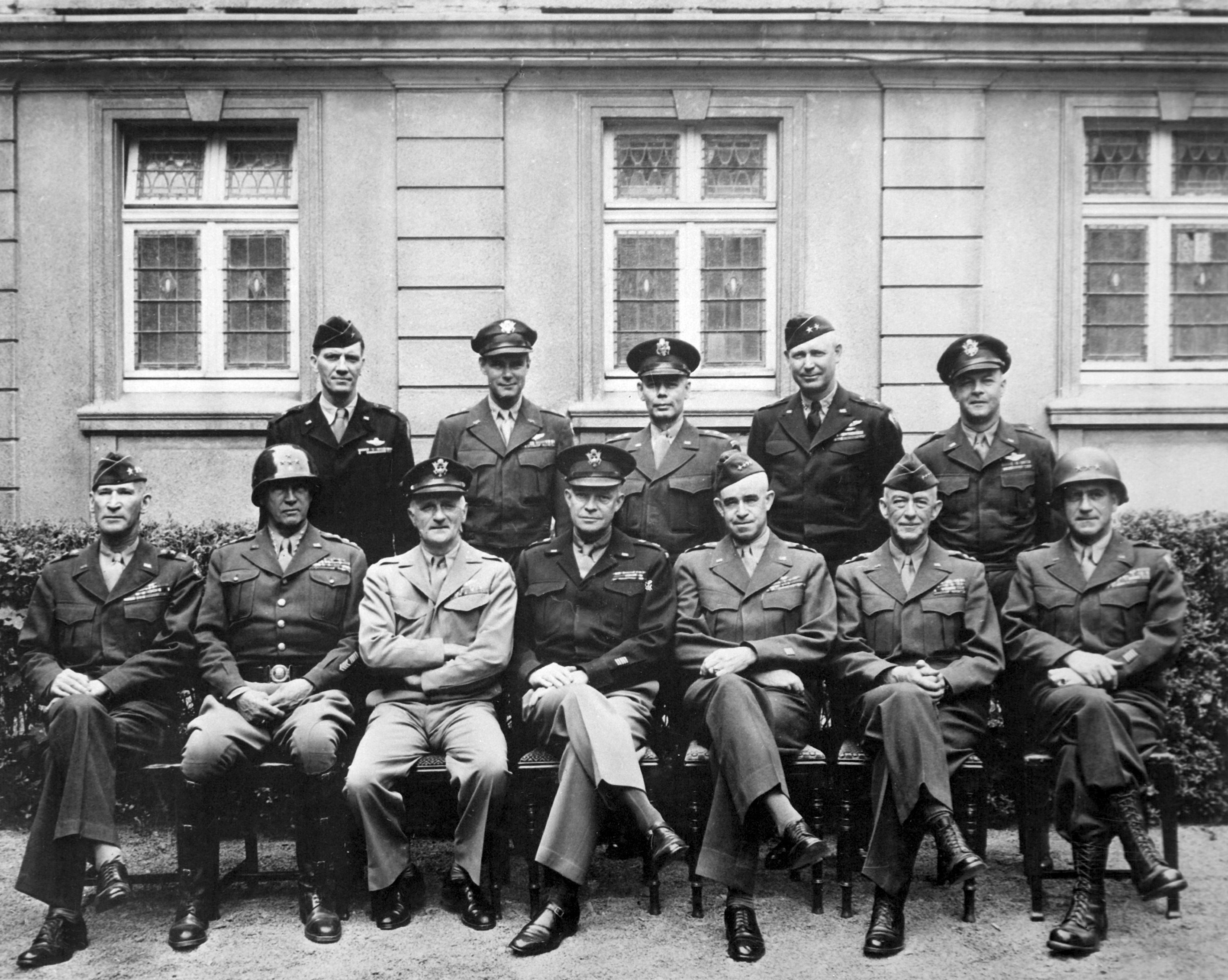
12th Army Group Ground-Air command team in April 1945 with Eisenhower, Spaatz, and Bedell Smith

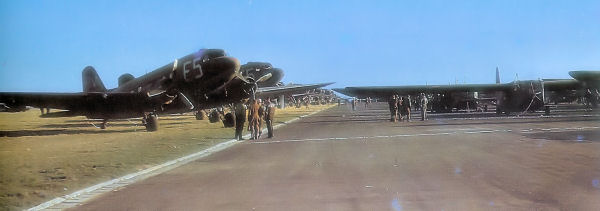
C-47s with Gliders of the 62d Troop Carrier Group preparing for the Airborne drop over the Rhine during "Operation Varsity.

On D-Day, IX Troop Carrier Command units flew over 2000 sorties conducting combat parachute jumps and glider landings as part of American airborne landings in Normandy of Operation Neptune. Other Ninth Air Force units carried out massive air attacks with P-51 Mustang, P-47 Thunderbolt fighter-bombers, North American B-25 Mitchell and Martin B-26 Marauder medium bombers. Air cover during the morning amphibious assault by Allied forces on the beaches of France was flown by P-38 Lightnings.

With the beaches secure, its tactical air units then provided the air power for the Allied break-out from the Normandy beachhead in the summer of 1944 during the Battle of Cherbourg, Battle for Caen, and the ultimate breakout from the beachhead, Operation Cobra.

Unlike Eighth Air Force, whose units stayed in the United Kingdom, Ninth Air Force units were very mobile, first deploying to France on 16 June 1944, ten days after the Normandy invasion by moving P-47 Thunderbolts to a beach-head landing strip.

Because of their short range, operational combat units would have to move to quickly prepared bases close to the front as soon as the Allied ground forces advanced. The bases were called "Advanced Landing Grounds" or "ALGs". On the continent, many ALGs were built either from scratch or from captured enemy airfields throughout France, the Low Countries and Germany. Ninth Air Force units moved frequently from one ALG to another.

By early August most Ninth Air Force operational fighter and bomber groups were transferred to bases in France and assigned to the U. S. Twelfth Army Group. These groups were then assigned to Tactical Air Command (TAC) organizations which supported Army ground units. XXIX Tactical Air Command (XXIX TAC) was activated in France on 15 September 1944, commanded by Brig. Gen. Richard E. Nugent, to support operations of the U.S. Ninth Army.

XXIX TAC supported the Ninth Army in the north; IX TAC supported the First Army in the center; and XIX TAC supported the Third Army in the south. Air cover over Allied-controlled areas on the continent was performed by the IX Air Defense Command. Ninth Air Force groups made numerous moves within France, the Low Countries and western Germany to keep within range of the advancing battle front before the end of hostilities in May 1945.

During Operation Dragoon, the invasion of Southern France in August 1944, two Ninth fighter groups were transferred to the provisional United States/Free French 1st Tactical Air Force supporting the invasion force's drive north. As part of Operation Market-Garden, the Ninth Air Force transferred its entire IX Troop Carrier Command with its fourteen C-47 groups to the 1st Allied Airborne Army in September 1944. Those troop carrier groups flew many of the C-47s and towed CG-4 Waco gliders for the Allied airborne unit drops—Operation Market Garden—to take the bridges northwest of Eindhoven at Son (mun. Son en Breugel), Veghel, Grave, Nijmegen and Arnhem in the Netherlands.

In December 1944 through January 1945, Ninth Air Force fighters and bombers were critical in defeating the Wehrmacht during the Battle of the Bulge. Initially American, British, and Canadian air power was grounded by very bad winter weather, but then the bad weather broke, freeing the tactical air forces to help break the back of the Wehrmacht attack. The long smash across France, Belgium, and Luxembourg was the highlight of the existence of the 9th Air Force.

In the spring of 1945, Ninth Air Force troop carrier units flew airborne parachute and glider units again during Operation Varsity, the Allied assault over the Rhine River on 24 March 1945. Operation Varsity was the single largest airborne drop in history. The operation saw the first use of the Curtiss-Wright C-46 Commando transport in Europe, operating with the reliable C-47 Skytrain of previous airborne operations, an experiment which ended with the catastrophic loss of 28% of the C-46s participating.

==== Postwar demobilization ====
Ninth Air Force tactical air support operations were flown over western Germany until the end of hostilities on 7 May. However, once the victory had been gained, the United States plunged into demobilization, just as it had done at the end of the First World War.

Most officers and men were sent back to the United States and their units inactivated. Others were assigned to the new United States Air Forces in Europe and were moved to captured Luftwaffe airfields to perform occupation duties. Some transport units relocated to France. Finally, with the mission completed, on 2 December 1945 the Ninth Air Force was inactivated at USAFE Headquarters at Wiesbaden Germany.

=== Cold War ===
see also: Nineteenth Air Force

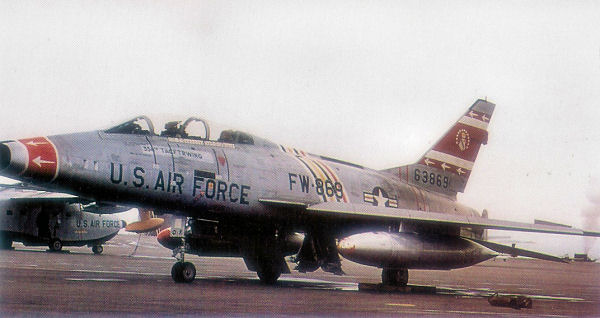
North American F-100F-10-NA Super Sabre serial 56-3869 of the 354th TFW, Myrtle Beach AFB South Carolina. F-100s were a mainstay of USAF tactical air power throughout the 1950s and 1960s.

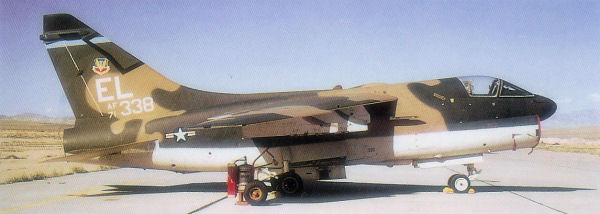
A-7D Serial No: 71-0338 of the 23d TFW, England AFB, Louisiana. The A-7D provided close air support for Army ground forces from the late 1960s until being replaced by the A-10 in the 1980s in front-line units.

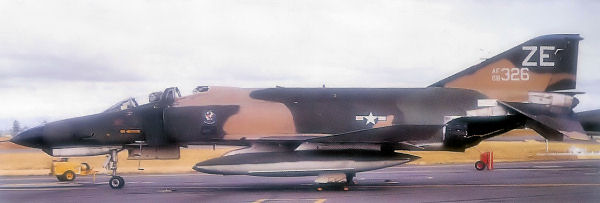
F-4E Serial No: 68-0326 of the 31st TFW, Homestead AFB, Florida, 1971. F-4 Phantom IIs were the dominant aircraft over the skies of Indochina during the Vietnam War.

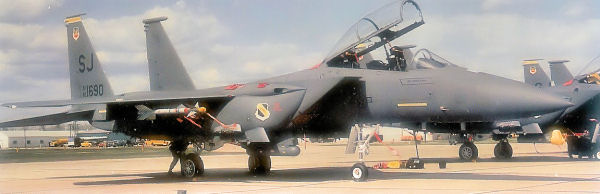
F-15E Strike Eagle Serial No: 88-1690 of the 4th TFW, Seymour Johnson AFB, NC. Developed from the F-15B in the late 1980s, the Strike Eagle gave the F-15 a close air support mission while retaining the air superiority role.

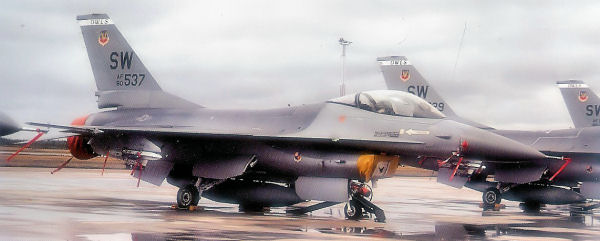
F-16A Serial No: 80-537 of the 363d/20th TFW, Shaw AFB, South Carolina. The F-16 is the most-produced tactical jet fighter in Air Force history.

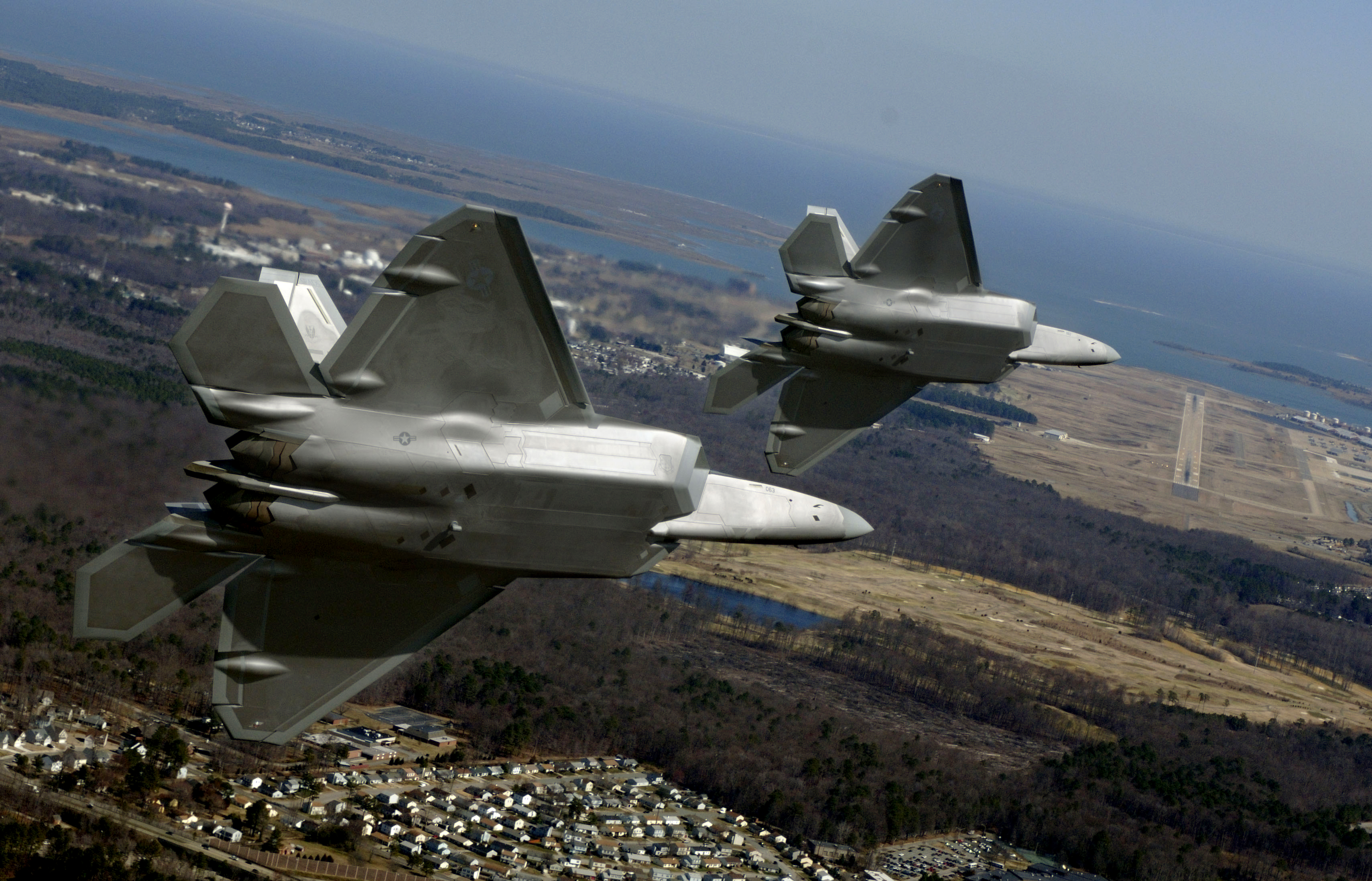
Two F-22A turn in on final approach to Langley Air Force Base

Following World War II, Ninth Air Force was reactivated on 28 March 1946 at Biggs AAF, Texas. After several relocations, on 20 August 1954, Ninth Air Force Headquarters was assigned to Shaw Air Force Base, South Carolina, where it remains today. The postwar Numbered Air Forces were components of the new major command structure of the United States Air Force, and Ninth Air Force became one of the tactical air forces of the new Tactical Air Command. Ninth Air Force commanded TAC Wings east of the Mississippi River.

Initially being equipped with propeller-driven F-51, F-47 and F-82 aircraft during the postwar years, in the 1950s, Ninth Air Force units received the jet-powered F/RF-80 Shooting Star, F-84G/F Thunderjet, F-86D/H Sabre, and F-100 Super Sabre aircraft. Ninth Air Force squadrons and wings were frequently deployed to NATO during the 1950s and 1960s as "Dual-Based" USAFE units, and reinforcing NATO forces in West Germany and France during the Lebanon crisis of 1958 and the 1961 Berlin Wall Crisis.

During the 1962 Cuban Missile Crisis, Ninth Air Force units went on war alert, deploying to bases in Florida, being able to respond to the crisis on a moment's notice.

During the Vietnam War, detached Ninth Air Force units engaged in combat operations over Vietnam, Cambodia and Laos. The practice of stripping away squadrons and aircraft from their home Tactical Air Command Wings and attaching them indefinitely to a new wing under Pacific Air Forces was the method used for long-term deployments to the South Vietnam and Thailand air bases engaged in combat operations. In addition to these operational deployments, Ninth Air Force units performed a "backfilling" role in Japan and South Korea for PACAF as well as in Italy and Spain for USAFE to replace units whose aircraft and personnel were deployed to Southeast Asia. With the end of American involvement during the early 1970s, these units were returned in large part to their home Ninth Air Force units in the United States.

During the remainder of the 1970s, NATO deployments resumed supporting the COMET, CORONET and CRESTED CAP exercises. These deployments were designed to exercise CONUS based Air Force squadrons long range deployment capabilities and to familiarize the personnel with the European theatre of operations. During these NATO deployments, exercises with Army infantry and armored units were conducted to enhance the Close Air Support role in Europe.

Ninth Air Force Wings in 1979 were:

- 1st Tactical Fighter Wing (F-15A/B) (FF) Langley Air Force Base, Virginia
- 4th Tactical Fighter Wing (F-4E) (SJ) Seymour Johnson Air Force Base, North Carolina
- 23d Tactical Fighter Wing (A-7D) (EL) England Air Force Base, Louisiana
- 31st Tactical Fighter Wing (F-4D) (ZE/HS) Homestead Air Force Base, Florida
- 33d Tactical Fighter Wing (F-15A/B) (EG) Eglin Air Force Base, Florida
- 56th Tactical Fighter Wing (F-4D/E) (MC) MacDill Air Force Base, Florida
- 347th Tactical Fighter Wing (F-4E) (MY) Moody Air Force Base, Georgia
- 354th Tactical Fighter Wing (A/OA-10A) (MB) Myrtle Beach Air Force Base, South Carolina
- 363d Tactical Reconnaissance Wing (RF-4C) (JO) Shaw Air Force Base, South Carolina

During the 1980s, Ninth Air Force wings upgraded from the Vietnam-Era F-4s and A-7s to newer F-15s, F-16 and A-10 aircraft. First-generation F-15A/B models were later sent to Air National Guard fighter units while Regular Air Force units upgraded to the higher-capability F-15C/Ds and the new F-15E replaced the F-4E in the 4th TFW.

With the end of the Cold War in the early 1990s, the 1991 Base Realignment and Closure Commission (BRAC) reductions meant the closing of Myrtle Beach AFB and England AFB. MacDill AFB was realigned under Air Combat Command as the headquarters of United States Central Command and United States Special Operations Command, but minus tactical aircraft operations with the reassignment of the 56th Fighter Wing to Air Education and Training Command and relocation to Luke AFB, Arizona.

The restructuring of USAF CONUS forces by the inactivation of Tactical Air Command and subsequent creation of Air Combat Command realigned Ninth Air Force with new units and new missions. In addition, the effects of Hurricane Andrew at Homestead AFB on 24 August 1992 essentially destroyed the facility. Although both George H. W. Bush and President Clinton promised to rebuild Homestead, the BRAC designated the installation for realignment to the Air Force Reserve, and on 1 April 1994, Headquarters, ACC inactivated its base support units and transferred base support responsibility to the Air Force Reserve Command and AFRC's 482d Fighter Wing, effectively ending ACC ownership of the base.

Concurrently, ACC also transferred responsibility for MacDill AFB to Air Mobility Command following the arrival of an air refueling unit and redesignation of the host air base wing as an air refueling wing (later redesignated as an air mobility wing).

=== CENTAF and the 1991 Gulf War ===
In 1980, Ninth Air Force units were allocated to the new Rapid Deployment Joint Task Force (RDJTF). In 1983, the RDJTF became a separate unified command known as the United States Central Command (USCENTCOM), focusing on the Middle East. Ninth Air Force provided the aircraft, personnel and materiel to form United States Central Command Air Forces (USCENTAF), the USAF air power of CENTCOM, which was also headquartered at Shaw AFB. Starting in 1981, Ninth Air Force aircraft and personnel were deployed to Egypt for Exercise Bright Star.

During Operation Desert Shield and Operation Desert Storm, Ninth Air Force units deployed to the Middle East, and flew combat missions over Kuwait and Iraq.

After the end of hostilities, units from the Ninth flew air missions over Iraq as part of Operation Deny Flight, Operation Northern Watch and Operation Southern Watch. From 1991, the 4404th Composite Wing (Provisional) served as a forward force, for most of that period flying from King Abdul Aziz AB, Saudi Arabia. Despite the boring nature of the quasi-peacetime patrols over both the northern and southern "no-fly zones," the years after 1991 were not entirely without hostile action. Time and time again Iraqi air defense radars came on line and "illuminated" American aircraft. There were also numerous cases where Iraqi anti-aircraft guns and missiles engaged American aircraft. In each case, the U.S. military aircraft would retaliate and in most cases, eliminate the offending air defense site(s). Among the deployed units were the 4th Air Expeditionary Wing, Camp Doha, Qatar (June 1996 and February 1997 in Air Expeditionary Force (AEF) Rotations III and IV respectively), the 347th Air Expeditionary Wing, Shaikh Isa AB, Bahrain, and the 363d Air Expeditionary Wing at Prince Sultan AB, Saudi Arabia.

During this "phony war," American pilots gained invaluable experience in air-to-ground tactics that could not be duplicated in practice missions back at home. Combat missions briefly resumed in 1998 during Operation Desert Fox.

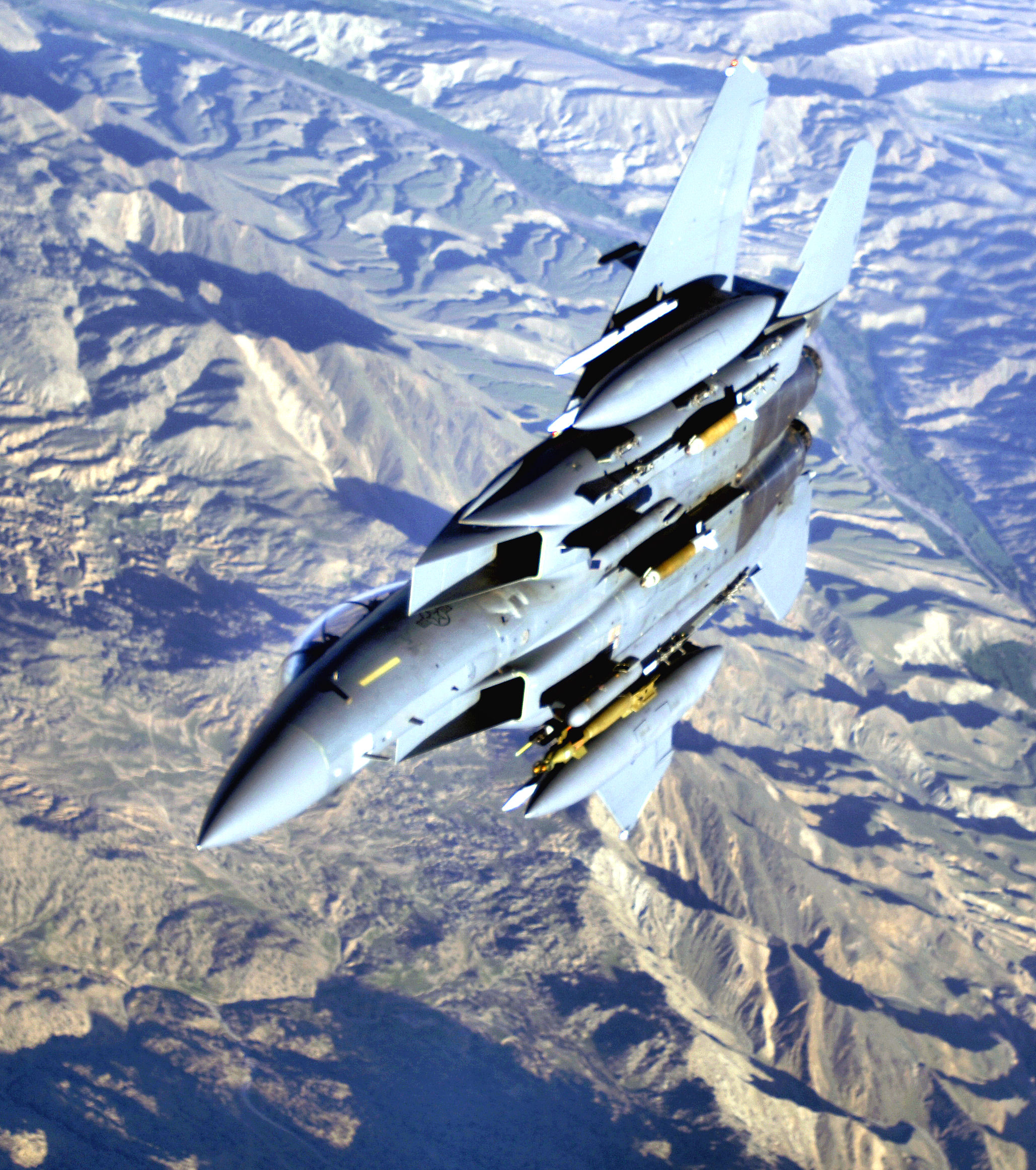
F-15E of the 336th Expeditionary Fighter Squadron over Afghanistan

=== Iraq and Afghanistan ===
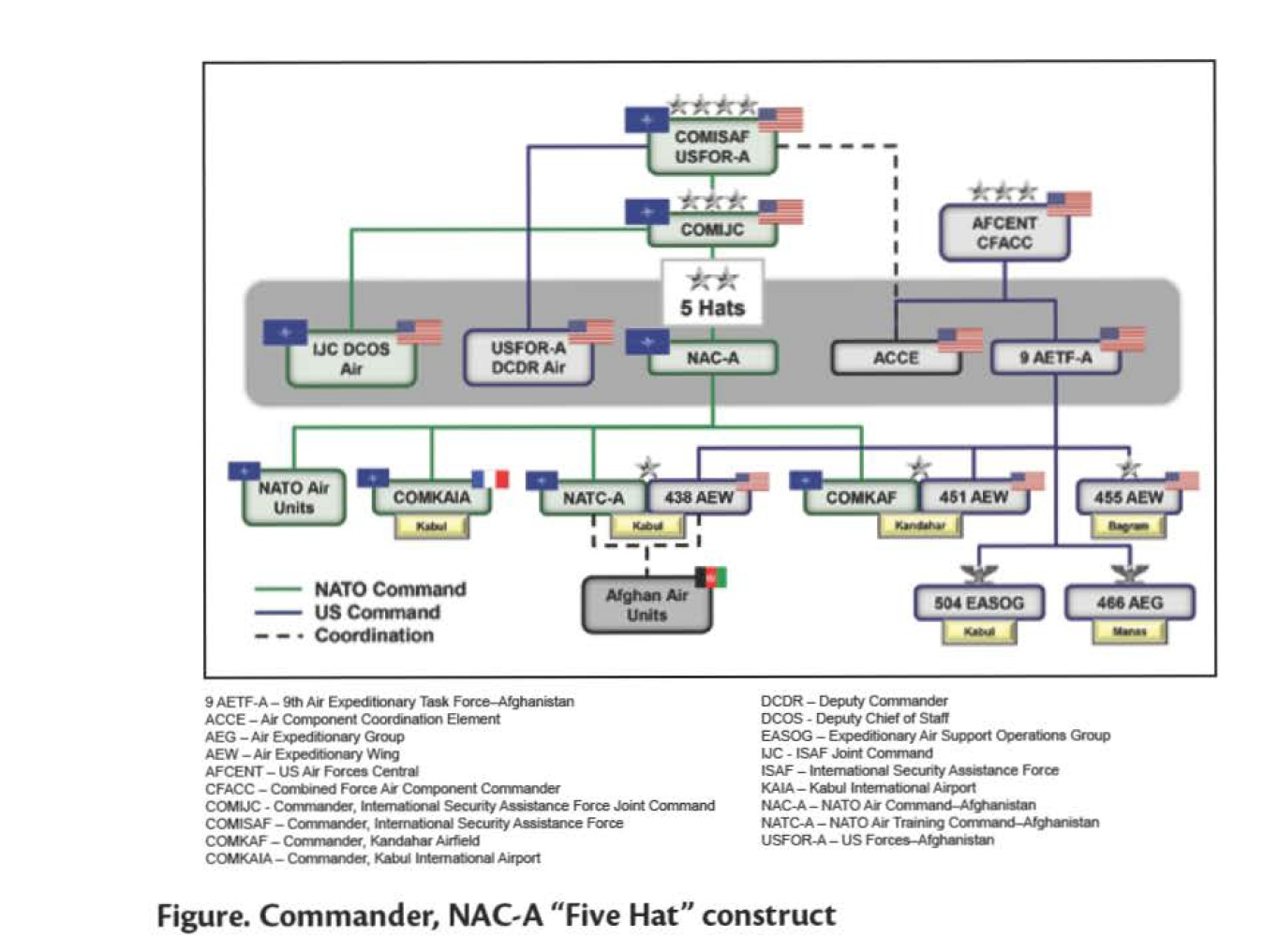
9th Air Expeditionary Task Force chain of command in Afghanistan, Jan-Feb 2014

Ninth Air Force units, flying as USCENTAF, flew operational missions during the 2002 Operation Enduring Freedom—Afghanistan (OEF-A) and the 2003 invasion of Iraq, Operation Iraqi Freedom; the operations against ISI/Daesh from 2014; and the Iran War (2026). Units are routinely engaged in combat operations.

U.S. Airmen are increasingly on the ground in Iraq: "They drive in convoys and even work with detainees. The main aerial hub in Iraq has 1,500 airmen doing convoy operations in and 1,000 working with detainees. The USAF is also involved in training Iraqis and performing other activities not usually associated with the Air Force. The dangers of the Air Force's new role were highlighted when the expeditionary wing lost its first female member in the line of duty in Iraq. A1C Elizabeth Jacobson, 21, was killed in a roadside bombing while performing convoy security near the U.S. detention center at Camp Bucca in southern Iraq." "More and more Air Force are doing Army jobs," said Senior Master Sgt. Matt Rossoni, 46, of San Francisco. "It's nothing bad about the Army. They're just tapped out." "Air Force Security Forces are traditionally associated with base defense, however, now they provide security for patrols and to deliver supplies."

The Air Force also kept up with its traditional duties. In November, the 386th Air Expeditionary Wing delivered its one millionth passenger to Iraq since October 2003. USAF missions included transporting troops, casualties and cargo flights. The Air Force, Navy and Marine Corps flew thousands of missions in support of U.S. ground troops in Iraq this fall, including attacks by unmanned Predator aircraft armed with Hellfire missiles, military records show. American and allied refueling, transport and surveillance planes also are in the air. Airstrikes have been largely in areas where the insurgency is strongest, like Balad, Ramadi and in the vicinity of Baghdad.

By the end of the 2000s, US and allied air forces were controlled by air component coordination elements (ACCEs), a brigadier general with a small staff team. Yet they felt underutilized. In response, in late 2010, the 9th Air and Space Expeditionary Task Force was established, to supervise two task forces which replaced the ACCEs. The two Air Expeditionary Task Force commanders had statutory authority, rather than just coordination inputs, over U.S. and allied air forces in Afghanistan and Iraq.

The 9th Air Expeditionary Task Force - Afghanistan, in early 2014, comprised the 438th, 451st, and 455th Air Expeditionary Wings, the 466th Air Expeditionary Group and the 504th Expeditionary Air Support Operations Group.

== Components ==
- 332nd Air Expeditionary Wing, undisclosed location, Southwest Asia, May 2016 – present. In 2015 the 332 AEG at Ahmed al-Jabir AB in Kuwait was expanded into the 332 AEW.
- 378th Air Expeditionary Wing, Prince Sultan Air Base, Saudi Arabia, 2019 – present

E-3 Sentry

- 379th Air Expeditionary Wing, Al Udeid Air Base, Qatar, 2002–present

B-1B Lancer, C-130 Hercules, C-17 Globemaster III, E-6B Mercury, E-8C Joint STARS, KC-135 Stratotanker, P-3 Orion, RC-135 Rivet Joint

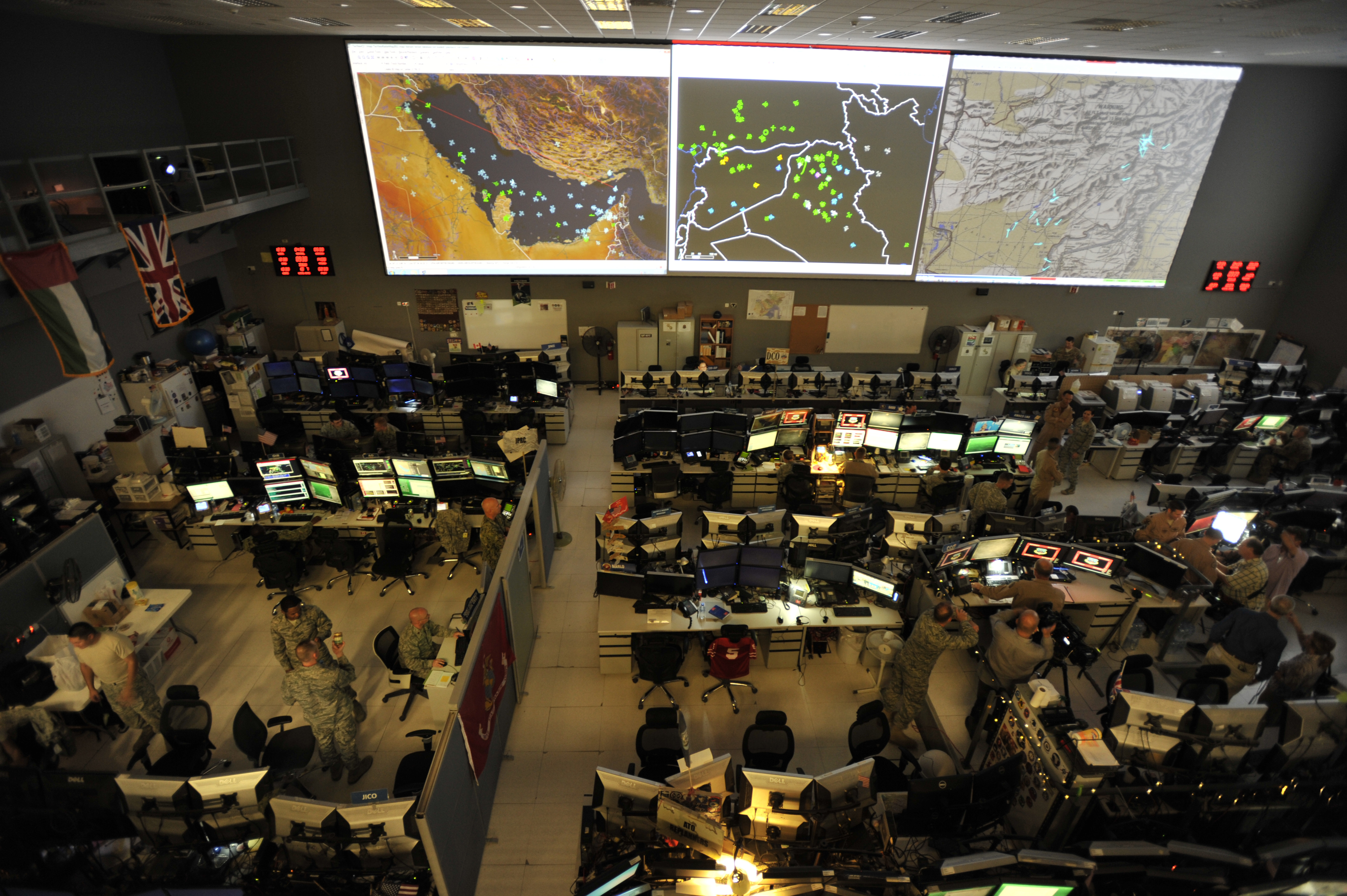
Combined Air and Space Operations Center (CAOC) at Al Udeid Air Base, Qatar, 2015

- 380th Air Expeditionary Wing, Al Dhafra Air Base, United Arab Emirates, 25 January 2002 – present

KC-10 Extender, RQ-4 Global Hawk, U-2 Dragon Lady

- 386th Air Expeditionary Wing, Ali Al Salem Air Base, Kuwait, 2002–present
- 387th Air Expeditionary Group, Kuwait (independent group, no longer under 386 AEW since 2022)

C-130 Hercules

Tenant Units assigned to the command are:

- 609th Air Operations Center, Al Udeid Air Base, Qatar, 1 January 1994 – present
- 1st Expeditionary Civil Engineer Group, Al Udeid Air Base, Qatar, October 2001 – present
  - 557 Expeditionary RED HORSE Squadron
  - 577 Expeditionary PRIME BEEF Squadron

Note: The 432d Air Expeditionary Wing is an Air Combat Command unit headquartered at Creech AFB, Nevada. It operates RQ-1 Predator and MQ-9 Reaper UAV aircraft in the AFCENT AOR.

== Lineage and assignments ==
- Established as the 5th Air Support Command on 21 August 1941

Activated on 1 September 1941
Redesignated 9th Air Force on 8 April 1942
Redesignated as Ninth Air Force on 18 September 1942
Inactivated on 2 December 1945

- Activated on 28 March 1946

Redesignated: Ninth Air Force (Tactical) on 1 August 1950
Redesignated: Ninth Air Force on 26 June 1951
Co-designation United States Central Command Air Forces established, 1 January 1983

CENTAF designation used for Ninth Air Force assets assigned to United States Central Command

Redesignated: Ninth Air Force (Air Forces Central), on 1 March 2008.
Redesignated: United States Air Forces Central Command, on 5 August 2009.
Redesignated: Ninth Air Force (Air Forces Central), on 20 August 2020.

=== Assignments ===
- Air Force Combat Command (later, Army Air Forces), 1 September 1941
- United States Army Forces in the Middle East, 12 November 1942
- European Theater of Operations, United States Army, 3 November 1943
- United States Strategic Air Forces in Europe

(later, United States Air Forces in Europe), 22 February 1944 – 2 December 1945

- Tactical Air Command, 28 March 1946
- Continental Air Command, 1 December 1948
- Tactical Air Command, 1 December 1950
- Air Combat Command, 1 June 1992 – present

=== Stations ===
- Bowman Field, Kentucky, 1 September 1941
- New Orleans Army Air Base, Louisiana, 24 January 1942
- Bolling Field, Washington, D.C., 22 July – October 1942
- Cairo, Egypt, 12 November 1942 – October 1943
- Sunninghill Park, Berkshire, England, November 1943 – September 1944
- Chantilly, France, 15 September 1944
- Bad Kissingen, Germany, 6 June – 2 December 1945
- Biggs Field, Texas, 28 March 1946
- Greenville Army Air Base (later Greenville Air Force Base), South Carolina, 31 October 1946
- Langley Air Force Base, Virginia, 14 February 1949
- Pope Air Force Base, North Carolina, 1 August 1950
- Shaw Air Force Base, South Carolina, 20 August 1954 – 5 Aug 2009
- Al Udeid Air Base, Qatar, 5 August 2009 – 20 August 2020
- Shaw Air Force Base, South Carolina, 20 August 2020 – present

=== Major components ===
==== World War II Components ====
Commands

- IX Air Defense Command: 1 July 1944 – 28 November 1945
- IX Bomber Command: 24 July 1942 – 20 November 1943
- IX Engineer Command: 1 July 1944 – 2 December 1945
- IX Troop Carrier Command: 16 October 1943 – 1 November 1944
- IX Fighter Command: 23 December 1942 – 16 November 1945
- IX Air Support (later, IX Tactical Air) Command): 4 December 1943 – 17 August 1945
- XIX Air Support (later, XIX Tactical Air Command): 4 January 1944 – 20 November 1945
- XXIX Air Support (later, XXIX Tactical Air) Command: 30 November 1943 – 3 October 1945
- IX Air Force Service Command

Groups

- 12th Bombardment Group: 21 January 1941 – 18 April 1942, 16 August 1942 – 22 August 1943
- 36th Fighter Group: 4 April-1 October 1944
- 366th Fighter Group: 8 January-15 February 1944
- 67th Observation Group, 29 March 1942 – 15 May 1942
- 363d Tactical Reconnaissance Group: 20 November – 11 December 1945

Squadrons

- 12th Observation Squadron: 21 January – 29 March 1942
- 15th Bombardment Squadron: 14 October 1941 – unknown
- 425th Night Fighter Squadron: 23 May – 10 June 1944; 7 July – 9 September 1945

==== USAF Air Divisions ====
- 12th Air Division: 23 February – 27 June 1949
- 19th Air Division

(formerly, 19 Bombardment Wing; IX Bomber Command; 9 Bombardment Division; 9 Air Division; 19 Bombardment Wing)
24 July 1942 – 20 November 1945; 22 December 1948 – 1 February 1949. 21 Air: 22 December 1948 – 1 February 1949.

- 42d Air Division: 1 July – 1 October 1957
- 49th Air Division: 22 December 1948 – 1 February 1949
- 69th Air Division: 23 February – 27 June 1949
- 302d Air Division: 22 December 1948 – 1 February 1949
- 833d Air Division: 1 October 1964 – 24 December 1969
- 834d Air Division: 25 September – 1 October 1957; 1 July 1964 – 15 October 1966
- 836th Air Division: 8 October 1957 – 1 July 1961; 1 July 1962 – 30 June 1971
- 837th Air Division: 8 February 1958 – 1 February 1963
- 838th Air Division: 25 September – 11 December 1957
- 839th Air Division: 8 October 1957 – 1 July 1963; 9 November 1964 – 1 December 1974
- 840th Air Division: 1 October 1964 – 24 December 1969

==== Groups ====
- 46th Bombardment Group: 1 September 1941 – 18 April 1942

=== Known Inactive Air Expeditionary units ===
See Organization of United States Air Force Units in the Gulf War for units and deployment of CENTAF forces during Operation Desert Shield and Operation Desert Storm

- 128th Air Expeditionary Group

Flights at several bases in AFCENT AOR

- 368th Expeditionary Air Support Operations Group

Camp Victory, Baghdad, Iraq

- 370th Air Expeditionary Advisory Group

Sather AB, Iraq

- 376th Air Expeditionary Wing

Transit Center at Manas, Kyrgyzstan

- 398th Air Expeditionary Group

Flights at several bases in AFCENT AOR

- 384th Air Expeditionary Wing

Shaikh Isa Air Base, Bahrain

- 406th Air Expeditionary Wing

RAFO Thumrait, Oman

- 410th Air Expeditionary Wing

H-5 Air Base, Jordan
Shaheed Mwaffaq AB, Jordan

- 416th Air Expeditionary Group

Karshi-Khanabad AB, Uzbekistan

- 447th Air Expeditionary Group

Sather AB, Iraq

- 506th Air Expeditionary Group

Kirkuk AB, Iraq

- 732d Air Expeditionary Group

Balad AB, Iraq

- 4417th Air Expeditionary Force

Shaheed Mwaffaq AB, Jordan

== Service and campaign streamers ==
- War in Southwest Asia
  - Defense of Saudi Arabia (Desert Shield) 1990–1991
  - Liberation of Kuwait (Desert Storm) 1991

== Awards ==
Award streamer	Award	Dates	Notes
	Air Force Outstanding Unit Award	1 June 1986 – 31 May 1988	
	Air Force Organizational Excellence Award	4 August 1990 – 11 April 1991	
	Air Force Outstanding Unit Award	1 July 1996 – 31 March 1998	
	Air Force Outstanding Unit Award	1 June 1998 – 31 May 2000	
	Air Force Organizational Excellence Award	1 June 2011 – 31 May 2013	

== List of commanders ==
=== AFCENT Commanders ===
No.	Commander		Term		
No.	Portrait	Name	Took office	Left office	Term length
1	Gilmary Michael Hostage III	Lieutenant General; Gilmary Michael Hostage III	5 August 2009	3 August 2011	1 year, 363 days
2	David L. Goldfein	Lieutenant General; David L. Goldfein	3 August 2011	12 July 2013	1 year, 343 days
3	John W. Hesterman III	Lieutenant General; John W. Hesterman III	12 July 2013	29 June 2015	1 year, 352 days
4	Charles Q. Brown Jr.	Lieutenant General; Charles Q. Brown Jr.	29 June 2015	22 July 2016	1 year, 23 days
5	Jeffrey L. Harrigian	Lieutenant General; Jeffrey L. Harrigian	22 July 2016	30 August 2018	2 years, 39 days
6	Joseph T. Guastella	Lieutenant General; Joseph T. Guastella	30 August 2018	16 July 2020	1 year, 321 days
7	Gregory M. Guillot	Lieutenant General; Gregory M. Guillot	16 July 2020	20 August 2020	35 days

=== 9 AF/AFCENT Commanders ===
No.	Commander		Term		
No.	Portrait	Name	Took office	Left office	Term length
1	Gregory M. Guillot	Lieutenant General; Gregory M. Guillot	20 August 2020	21 July 2022	1 year, 335 days
2	Alexus Grynkewich	Lieutenant General; Alexus Grynkewich	21 July 2022	18 April 2024	1 year, 272 days
3	Derek France	Lieutenant General; Derek France	18 April 2024	4 August 2026	2 years, 108 days
4	Daniel T. Lasica	Lieutenant General; Daniel T. Lasica	4 August 2026	Incumbent	67 days
