= XIX Tactical Air Command =

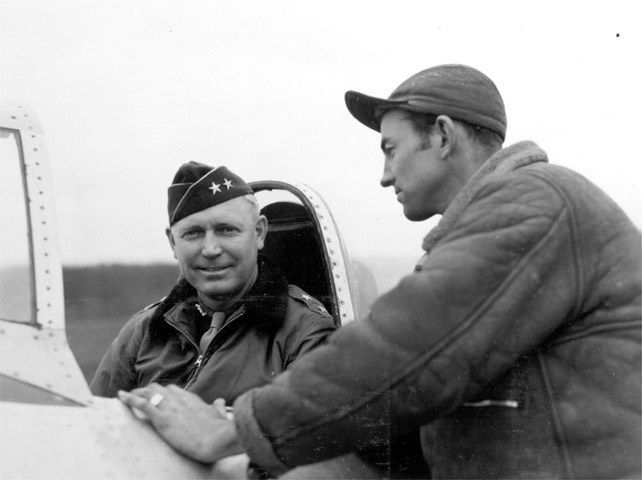
- Maj Gen Otto P. Weyland in the cockpit of his P-47 Thunderbolt
- Active: 1944–1946
- Country: United States
- Branch: United States Air Force
- Role: Command of fighter bomber and aerial reconnaissance units
- Engagements: European Theater of Operations

Commanders
- Notable commanders: Maj Gen Otto P. Weyland; Maj Gen Elwood R. Quesada

Insignia
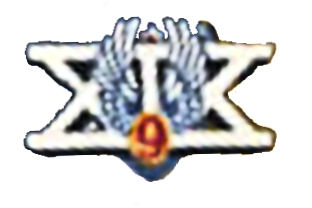
- Patch with XIX Tactical Air Command unofficial emblem

The XIX Tactical Air Command is an inactive United States Air Force unit. The unit's last assignment was with the Ninth Air Force based at Biggs Field, Texas, where it was inactivated on 31 March 1946.

During World War II, the mission of the XIX Tactical Air Command was to support General Patton's Third Army with tactical air support throughout during the army's advance from formation in France on 1 August 1944 until VE-Day. The initial Commander was Maj Gen Elwood Richard Quesada.

== History ==
Formed in England in early 1944, the command was designed to provide air support to Army ground forces, primarily with Republic P-47 Thunderbolt and North American P-51 Mustang aircraft. It supported all of Third Army's operations and more. Its roles included an extensive number of tactical roles: close air support, battlefield air interdiction, deep interdiction, dive bombing, counterair, reconnaissance, and even leaflet dropping.

The command's close air support role took its most concerted, extended, and spectacular form in supporting Patton's armored and motorized infantry columns as they sped across France. The Third Army's tank crews and their accompanying air liaison officers pointed out enemy concentrations, and divisional artillery at times gave further assistance by marking targets with smoke. In return, the P-47 and P-51 pilots of the command provided cover for the tanks.

A typical close air support tactic involved one-hour shifts of four aircraft per flight, and four more on ground alert could be called in if necessary. As little as three minutes after being contacted, they could strike the designated target, thereby freeing the armored forces to continue their advance.

Another role of the command was dive bombing. Normally thought of as a tactic, the command considered it a separate role. It resembled deep interdiction, for both types of missions made use of various aerial bombing techniques and normally attacked similar, prearranged targets. But while deep interdiction was designed to cut off enemy movements either in or out of the combat zone, dive-bombing missions were most often used for static warfare. They were employed, for example, during the unsuccessful September attempt to seize Metz, and their most extensive use was during the siege at Brest.

The results of Brest were not particularly impressive. It was soon obvious that the defenders––as part of Hitler's "hold on to the ports" strategy––had ample provisions and were determined to hold out. It also became evident that fighters and fighter bombers assigned to the operation were insufficient to perform effectively all of the tasks they were expected to carry out, particularly in terms of dive bombing. P-47s and P-51s simply did not have the bombing power to bring about the desired results. Thus the American commander called on other air formations to assist. Eighth Air Force responded between 11 August and 5 September with four missions in which 983 Boeing B-17 Flying Fortressess dropped 2520 tons of bombs. British Bomber Command made two raids with approximately 220 Avro Lancasters taking part. IX Bomber Command's Martin B-26 Marauders and new Douglas A-26 Invaders undertook six missions. IX Tactical Air Command loaned some of its squadrons to the command – squadrons that flew 839 sorties between 5 and 11 September, when Brest's capture was accorded a high priority. By the time the last of Germany's beleaguered troops capitulated on the 19th, the Allies had flown more than 3500 Brest-related sorties. The city was in shambles. Its port facilities, for which the operation originally had been undertaken, were so badly damaged (by German demolitions along with Allied bombing and artillery shelling) that the Americans never used it as a major supply port. Obviously, air power had affected the outcome of the battle but not in the way that had been hoped for.

XIX Tactical Air Command was also involved in counterair operations, although, because of the Luftwaffe's relative weakness, to a lesser extent than it might have been. Only in critical situations or when they had a numerical advantage did Jagdkorps II's Messerschmitt Bf 109s and Focke-Wulf Fw 190s venture out and pose a threat. During the early August Mortain counteroffensive, German fighters and some bombers did support the attack, but they were overwhelmed by the Allies' superior numbers, better aircraft, and experienced pilots. While IX Tactical Air Command led the counterair response, the Royal Air Force and the command's 354th Fighter Group of P-51s also lent a hand. At Falaise, the German Air Force again was active, and the command's fighters performed a variety of defensive and offensive counterair tasks––intercepts, sweeps, combat air patrols, and escorts, including bomber escorts––along with other support missions. Near Paris, U.S. pilots also encountered opposition; but at times several of Weyland's groups reported seeing no enemy aircraft for days at a time. Although the Allies remained aware that the situation might change, Allied aircraft now reigned supreme.

XIX Tactical Air Command further undertook reconnaissance duties. Most of the sorties were confined to visual reconnaissance, but they included day and night photo missions as well, especially from 10th Photo Group, whose P-51s were stationed in the area. Overall, during the two months, aircraft under Weyland's command flew 2011 reconnaissance sorties, or slightly more than 9 percent of the 22,233 total sorties flown.

One final mission was that command pilots performed several special air operations in the form of leaflet-dropping sorties. During August and September, it was involved in seven different missions––close air support, battlefield and deep interdiction, dive bombing, counterair, aerial reconnaissance, and special operations.

=== Lineage ===
- Constituted as the XIX Air Support Command on 29 November 1943

Activated on 4 January 1944
Redesignated XIX Tactical Air Command in April 1944.
Inactivated on 31 March 1946
Disbanded on 8 October 1948

=== Assignments ===
- Ninth Air Force, 4 January 1944 – 31 March 1946

=== Components ===
Wings

- 100th Fighter Wing: 15 April 1944 – 28 June 1945 (under operational control of IX Fighter Command until 31 July 1944)
- 303d Fighter Wing: 1 November 1944 – 15 December 1944

Groups

- 10th Reconnaissance Group: 1 February 1944 – 25 June 1947
- 48th Fighter Group: 28 April – August 1945
- 358th Fighter Group: 16 January–July 1945
- 362d Fighter Group: Attached, 1 August 1944 – August 1945
- 366th Fighter Group: 28 June – 4 July 1945 (attached to XXIX Tactical Air Command (Provisional) until 21 June 1945)
- 368th Fighter Group: 16 January-16 November 1945
- 371st Fighter Group: Attached, 1 August-29 September 1944; Assigned: 29 September-1 November 1944; 16 February 1945 – October 1945
- 373d Fighter Group: Attached, 4 April 1944 – 4 August 1945
- 405th Fighter Group, 5 August 1944 – 8 February 1945 (attached to IX Tactical Air Command until c. September 1944)
- 406th Fighter Group: Attached, 1 August-1 October 1944; 1 October 1944-8 February 1945

Squadrons

- 2nd Composite Squadron: 25 October – 7 November 1945
- 3rd Composite Squadron: 25 October – 7 November 1945
- 4th Air Support Control Squadron (later 4th Tactical Air Communications Squadron): 4 March 1944 – 4 July 1945
- 11th Air Support Control Squadron (later 11th Tactical Air Communications Squadron): 4 March 1944 – 4 July 1945
- 11th Tactical Reconnaissance Squadron (later 11th Reconnaissance Squadron): 7 November 1945 – 27 February 1946 (attached to 69th Reconnaissance Group)
- 13th Tactical Reconnaissance Squadron (later 29th Reconnaissance Squadron): 7 November 1945 – 18 February 1946 (attached to 69th Reconnaissance Group)
- 14th Liaison Squadron: 25 April 1944 – 4 July 1945 (attached to Twelfth Army Group after 15 November 1944)
- 31st Tactical Reconnaissance Squadron: 10 January – 3 February 1946
- 39th Photographic Reconnaissance Squadron: flight attached 6 January – 28 February 1945
- 72d Liaison Squadron: 11 January – 21 March 1946
- 101st Bombardment Photographic Squadron: 7 November 1945 – 25 December 1945 (attached to 69th Reconnaissance Group)
- 161st Liaison Squadron: 25 October 1945 – 21 March 1946
- 162nd Liaison Squadron: 25 October 1945 – 21 March 1946
- 162d Tactical Reconnaissance Squadron: 21–25 April 1945 (attached to 9th Reconnaissance Group (Provisional) until 22 April 1945; 10th Photographic Group)
- 167th Liaison Squadron: 21 January – 21 March 1946
- 398th Fighter Squadron: 25 October – 7 November 1945
- 425th Night Fighter Squadron: 7 October 1944 – 7 July 1945

=== Stations ===
- RAF Middle Wallop (AAF-449), England, 4 January 1944
- Aldermaston Court (AAF-476), England, February 1944
- France, July 1944
- Luxembourg, January 1945
- Germany, April–July 1945
- Drew Field, Florida, 21 August 1945
- Barksdale Field, Louisiana, 17 October 1945
- Biggs Field, Texas, 11 December 1945 – 31 March 1946
