= 7486th Air Defense Group =

7486th Air Defense Group Later 7486th Air Base Group
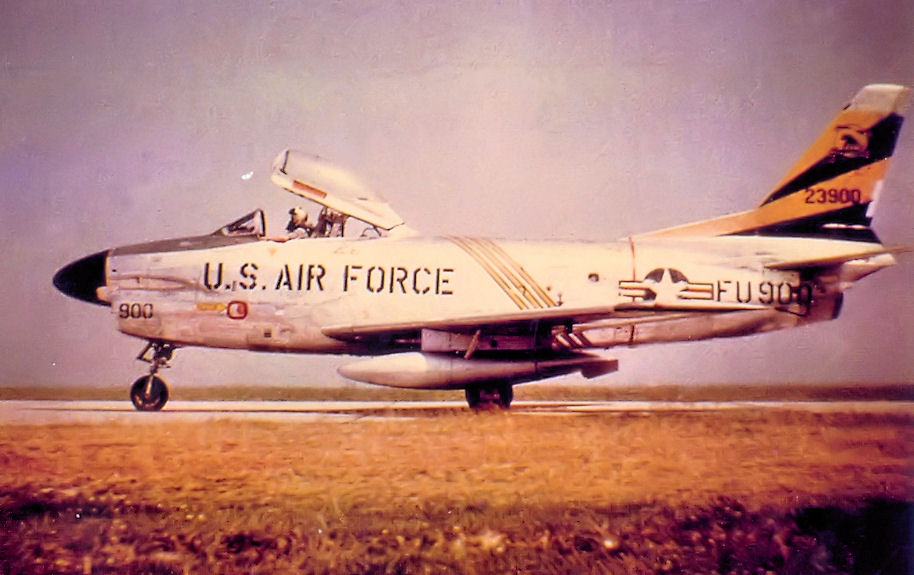
- F-86D Sabre of the 440th Fighter-Interceptor Squadron (Note: Aircraft is North American F-86D-45-NA Sabre, serial 52-3900. This aircraft was transferred to the Yugoslavian Air Force in 1960. Dirkx, Marco (23 September 2025). "1952 USAF Serial Numbers". Joe Baugher’s Serial Number List.)
- Active: 1954–1961
- Branch: United States Air Force
- Role: Air defense

The 7486th Air Defense Group is an inactive United States Air Force organization. It served as an interim headquarters for interceptor aircraft units deploying to Europe before moving to Phalsbourg Air Base, France as an air base support unit unitl it was inactivated in 1961.

== History ==
In July 1954, the 440th and 496th Fighter-Interceptor Squadrons, flying North American F-86D Sabres, deployed from the United States to Landstuhl Air Base, West Germany. The 7486th Air Defense Group was organized at Landstuhl to act as their headquarters, although the squadrons were not assigned to it until December.

However, this arrangement was temporary, as United States Air Forces in Europe intended to disperse its fighter squadrons to bases throughout West Germany. In anticipation of this arrangement, the group was redesignated the 7486th Air Base Group in July 1955. In January 1956, the squadrons were reassigned to the 86th Fighter-Interceptor Group prior to the 440th moving to Erding Air Station, and the 496th to Hahn Air Base, Germany later that year. The group moved to Phalsbourg Air Base, France, where it became the base support unit until inactivating in January 1961

== Lineage ==
- Established as the 7486th Air Defense Group on 1 May 1954

Redesignated 7486th Air Base Group on 1 July 1955
Inactivated c. 8 January 1961

=== Assignments ===
- Twelfth Air Force, 1 May 1954
- 86th Fighter-Interceptor Wing, 6 January 1956– c.8 January 1961

=== Stations ===
- Landstuhl Air Base, West Germany, 1 May 1954
- Phalsbourg Air Base, France, 3 January 1956 – c. 8 January 1961

=== Components ===
- 440th Fighter-Interceptor Squadron, 2 December 1954 – 3 January 1956
- 496th Fighter-Interceptor Squadron, 2 December 1954 – 3 January 1956
- 7486th Air Base Squadron, 3 January 1956-30 June 1958
- 7486th Field Maintenance Squadron (later 7486th Consolidated Aircraft Maintenance Squadron), 3 January 1956-8 January 1961
- 7486th Installations Sq (later 7486th Civil Engineering Squadron), 3 January 1956-8 January 1961
- 7486 Supply Squadron, 3 January 1956-8 January 1961
- 7486 Support Squadron, 3 January 1956-8 January 1961

=== Aircraft ===
- North American F-86D Sabre: 1954-1956
