= HMS Gardiner =

Royal Navy frigate

History

United States
- Name: USS O'Toole (DE-274)
- Namesake: U.S. Navy Ensign John Albert O’Toole (1916–1942)
- Ordered: 25 January 1942
- Builder: Boston Navy Yard, Boston, Massachusetts
- Laid down: 20 May 1943
- Launched: 8 July 1943
- Completed: 28 September 1943
- Fate: Transferred to United Kingdom 28 September 1943
- Acquired: Returned by United Kingdom 12 February 1946
- Fate: Sold 10 December 1946 for scrapping; Scrapped June 1947

United Kingdom
- Name: HMS Gardiner
- Namesake: Captain Arthur Gardiner
- Acquired: 28 September 1943
- Commissioned: 28 September 1943
- Decommissioned: 1945
- Identification: Pennant number: K478
- Fate: Returned to United States 12 February 1946

General characteristics
- Class & type: Captain-class frigate
- Displacement: 1,190 long tons (1,210 t) (standard)
- Length: 289 ft 5 in (88.2 m)
- Beam: 35 ft 2 in (10.7 m)
- Draught: 10 ft 1 in (3.1 m)
- Installed power: 6,000 shp (4,500 kW) electric motors
- Propulsion: 2 shafts; 4 diesel engines
- Speed: 20 knots (37 km/h; 23 mph)
- Range: 6,000 nmi (11,000 km; 6,900 mi) at 12 knots (22 km/h; 14 mph)
- Complement: 198
- Sensors & processing systems: SA & SL type radars; Type 144 series Asdic; MF Direction Finding; HF Direction Finding
- Armament: 3 × single 3 in (76 mm)/50 Mk 22 guns; 1 × twin Bofors 40 mm; 9 × single 20 mm Oerlikon guns; 1 × Hedgehog anti-submarine mortar; 2 × Depth charge rails and four throwers

HMS Gardiner (K478) was a British Captain-class frigate of the Royal Navy in commission during World War II. Originally constructed as the United States Navy Evarts-class destroyer escort USS O'Toole (DE-274), she served in the Royal Navy from 1943 to 1946.

== Description ==
The Evarts-class ships had an overall length of 289 feet 5 inches (88.2 m), a beam of 35 feet 2 inches (10.7 m), and a draught of 10 feet 1 inch (3.1 m) at full load. They displaced 1,190 long tons (1,210 t) at (standard) and 1,416 long tons (1,439 t) at full load. The ships had a diesel–electric powertrain derived from a submarine propulsion system with four General Motors 16-cylinder diesel engines providing power to four General Electric electric generators which sent electricity to four 1,500-shaft-horsepower (1,100 kW) General Electric electric motors which drove the two propeller shafts. The destroyer escorts had enough power give them a speed of 20 knots (37 km/h; 23 mph) and enough fuel oil to give them a range of 6,000 nautical miles (11,000 km; 6,900 mi) at 12 knots (22 km/h; 14 mph). Their crew consisted of 198 officers and ratings.

The armament of the Evarts-class ships in British service consisted of three single mounts for 50-caliber 3-inch (76 mm)/50 Mk 22 dual-purpose guns; one superfiring pair forward of the bridge and the third gun aft of the superstructure. Anti-aircraft defence was intended to consisted of a twin-gun mount for 40-millimetre (1.6 in) Bofors anti-aircraft (AA) guns atop the rear superstructure with nine 20-millimetre (0.8 in) Oerlikon AA guns located on the superstructure, but production shortages meant that that not all guns were fitted, or that additional Oerlikons replaced the Bofors guns. A Mark 10 Hedgehog anti-submarine mortar was positioned just behind the forward gun. The ships were also equipped with two depth charge rails at the stern and four "K-gun" depth charge throwers.

== Construction and career ==
The ship was laid down as the U.S. Navy destroyer escort USS O'Toole (DE-274), the first ship of the name, by the Boston Navy Yard in Boston, Massachusetts, on 20 May 1943 and launched on 8 July 1943. O'Toole was transferred to the United Kingdom under Lend-Lease upon completion on 28 September 1943. Commissioned into service in the Royal Navy as HMS Gardiner (K478) on 28 September 1943 simultaneously with her transfer, the ship served on patrol and escort duty for the remainder of World War II.

The Royal Navy decommissioned Gardiner by October 1945 after the end of the war and returned her to the U.S. Navy at the Boston Naval Shipyard on 12 February 1946. The ship was sold to the Atlas Steel and Supply Company on 10 December 1946 for scrapping. In 1947, she was resold to the Kulky Steel and Equipment Company of Alliance, Ohio, and finally was scrapped in June 1947.
