= Arthur Gardner =

Arthur Gardner may refer to:

- Arthur Gardiner (Royal Navy officer) (1716?–1768), British navy officer
- Arthur Gardner (footballer) (1878–after 1900), English professional footballer
- A. D. Gardner or Arthur Duncan Gardner (1884–1977), professor of medicine at Oxford University
- Arthur Gardner (diplomat) (1889–1967), United States foreign diplomat
- Arthur Gardner (producer) (1910–2014), American actor and film producer
- Art Gardner (born 1952), outfielder in Major League Baseball

== See also ==
- Arthur Gardiner (disambiguation)
- Arthur Gardiner Butler (1844–1925), English entomologist and naturalist
- Ernest Gardner (art historian) (Ernest Arthur Gardner, 1878–1972), known as Arthur Gardner, architectural historian
