= Ernest Gardner =

Ernest Gardner may refer to:

- Ernest Gardner (politician) (1846–1925), British politician
- Ernest Gardner (art historian) (1878–1972), English writer, art historian and photographer with a particular focus on medieval sculpture and architecture
- Ernest Arthur Gardner (1862–1939), English archaeologist and director of the British School at Athens between 1887 and 1895
- Ernest Franklin Gardner (1923–1995), farmer, educator and political figure in Saskatchewan
