= USS Tripoli (CVE-64) =

Casablanca-class escort carrier of the US Navy

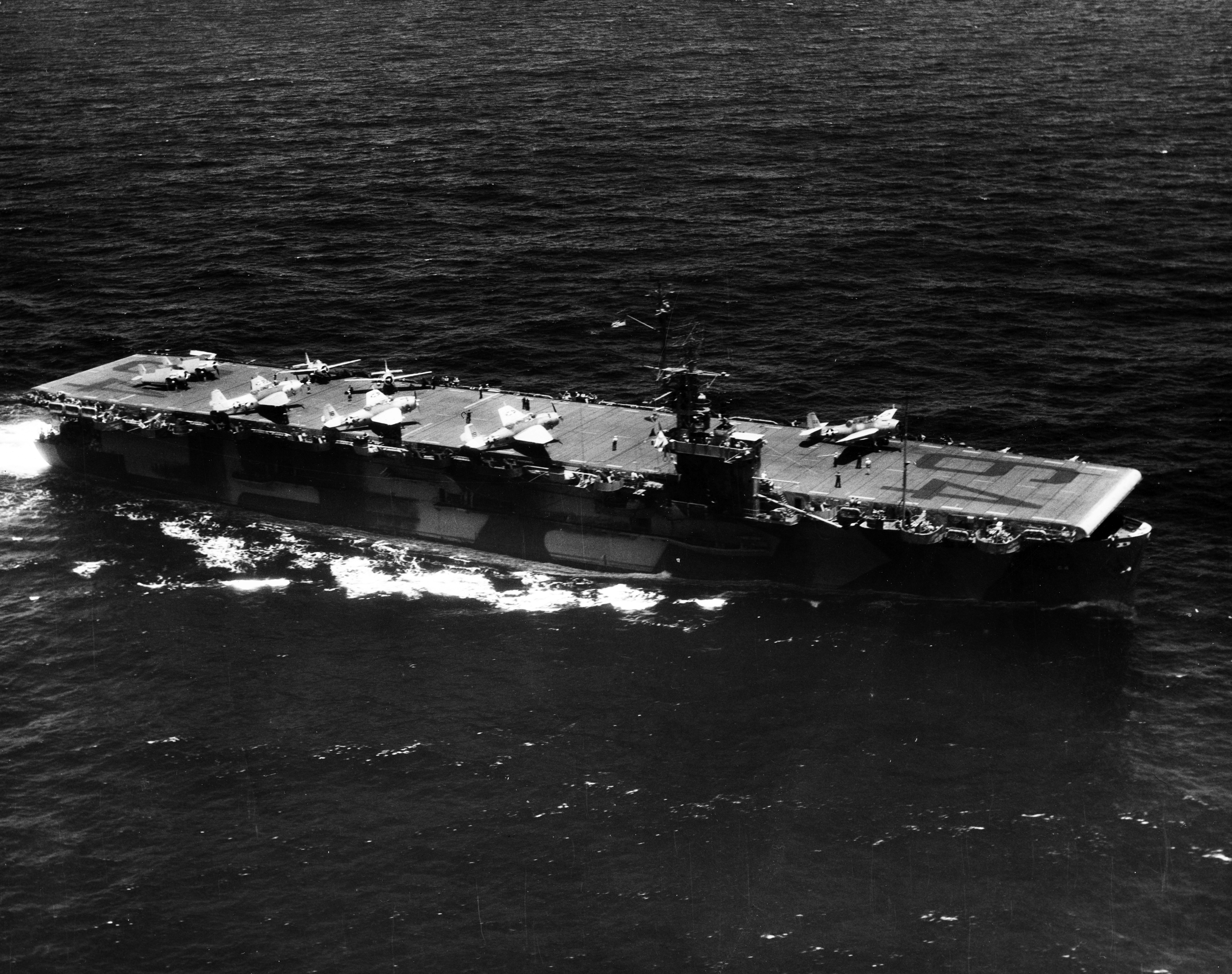
- USS Tripoli (CVE-64) in April 1944

History

United States
- Name: Tripoli
- Namesake: Battle of Derna
- Builder: Kaiser Shipbuilding Company
- Laid down: 1 February 1943
- Launched: 13 July 1943
- Commissioned: 31 October 1943
- Decommissioned: 22 May 1946
- Recommissioned: 5 January 1952
- Decommissioned: 25 November 1958
- Stricken: 1 February 1959
- Fate: Sold for scrap, January 1960

General characteristics
- Class & type: Casablanca-class escort carrier
- Displacement: 7,800 long tons (7,925 t)
- Length: 512 ft 3 in (156.13 m) overall
- Beam: 65 ft (20 m), 108 ft (33 m) maximum width
- Draft: 22 ft 4 in (6.81 m)
- Installed power: 4 × 285 psi (1,970 kPa) steam boilers; 9,000 shp (6,700 kW)
- Propulsion: 2 × 5-cylinder reciprocating Skinner Unaflow engines; 2 × screws
- Speed: 19 knots (35 km/h; 22 mph)
- Range: 10,240 nmi (18,960 km; 11,780 mi) at 15 kn (28 km/h; 17 mph)
- Complement: Total:910-916 officers and men; Embarked Squadron:50-56; Ship's Crew:860
- Armament: 1 × 5 in (127 mm)/38 cal dual purpose gun; 16 × Bofors 40 mm guns (8×2); 20 × Oerlikon 20 mm cannons
- Aircraft carried: 28

Service record
- Part of: Escort Carrier Task Group 21.15 (1943-44), 4th Fleet (1944-1945), Military Sealift Command (1952-58)
- Operations: Operation Magic Carpet (1945), Korean War (1952)

USS Tripoli (CVE-64) was a Casablanca-class escort carrier of the United States Navy. Tripoli is the first US Navy ship named for the Battle of Derne in 1805. It was the decisive victory of a mercenary army led by a detachment of United States Marines and soldiers against the forces of Tripoli during the First Barbary War. It was the first recorded land battle of the United States fought overseas.

== Design and description ==
A side profile of the design of Thetis Bay.

Tripoli was a Casablanca-class escort carrier, the most numerous type of aircraft carriers ever built. Built to stem heavy losses during the Battle of the Atlantic, they came into service in late 1943, by which time the U-boat threat was already in retreat. Although some did see service in the Atlantic, the majority were utilized in the Pacific, ferrying aircraft, providing logistics support, and conducting close air support for the island-hopping campaigns. The Casablanca-class carriers were built on the standardized Type S4-S2-BB3 hull, a lengthened variant of the Doyen-class hull, and specifically designed to be mass-produced using welded prefabricated sections. This allowed them to be produced at unprecedented speeds: the final ship of her class, Munda, was delivered to the Navy just 101 days after the laying of her keel.

Tripoli was 512 ft 3 in (156.13 m) long overall (490 ft (150 m) at the waterline), had a beam of 65 ft 2 in (19.86 m), and a draft of 20 ft 9 in (6.32 m). She displaced 8,188 long tons (8,319 t) standard, which increased to 10,902 long tons (11,077 t) with a full load. To carry out flight operations, the ship had a 257 ft (78 m) hangar deck and a 474 ft (144 m) flight deck. Her compact size necessitated the installation of an aircraft catapult at her bow, and there were two aircraft elevators to facilitate movement of aircraft between the flight and hangar deck: one each fore and aft.

She was powered by four Babcock & Wilcox Express D boilers that raised 285 psi (1,970 kPa) of steam at 577 °F (303 °C). The steam generated by these boilers fed two Skinner Unaflow reciprocating steam engines, delivering 9,000 hp (6,700 kW) to two propeller shafts. This allowed her to reach speeds of 19 kn (35 km/h; 22 mph), with a cruising range of 10,240 nmi (18,960 km; 11,780 mi) at 15 kn (28 km/h; 17 mph). For armament, one 5 in (127 mm)/38 caliber dual-purpose gun was mounted on the stern. Additional anti-aircraft defense was provided by eight Bofors 40 mm (1.57 in) anti-aircraft guns in single mounts and twelve Oerlikon 20 mm (0.79 in) cannons mounted around the perimeter of the deck. By 1945, Casablanca-class carriers had been modified to carry twenty Oerlikon cannons and sixteen Bofors guns; the doubling of the latter was accomplished by putting them into twin mounts. Sensors onboard consisted of a SG surface-search radar and a SK air-search radar.

Although Casablanca-class escort carriers were intended to function with a crew of 860 and an embarked squadron of 50 to 56, the exigencies of wartime often necessitated the inflation of the crew count. They were designed to operate with 27 aircraft, but the hangar deck could accommodate much more during transport or training missions.

== Construction ==
She was built under a Maritime Commission (MARCOM) contract (MC hull 1101) at Vancouver, Washington, and was laid down by the Kaiser Shipyards on 1 February 1943, as Didrickson Bay (ACV-64). Renamed Tripoli on 3 April 1943, and launched on 13 July 1943, sponsored by Mrs. Leland D. Webb, and commissioned on 31 October 1943, at Astoria, Oregon.

== Service history ==
=== World War II ===
Following shakedown training off the California coast, the escort carrier entered the repair base at San Diego, California. There, on 4 January 1944, gasoline was inadvertently dumped into the water around the forward part of the ship, on the starboard side. Acetylene torch sparks ignited the volatile mixture, and flames quickly spread from the bow to frame 82, engulfing the forward galley walkway and the island superstructure. Yardcraft and the ship's crew battled the flames and soon had the fire under control, but not before two men had died.

==== Atlantic ====
Subsequently repaired, Tripoli departed San Diego on 31 January, bound for the Panama Canal and duty with the Atlantic Fleet. She arrived at her new home port, Norfolk, Virginia on 16 February. Embarking Composite Squadron 13 (VC-13) - 13 Grumman FM-2 Wildcats and Grumman TBM Avengers - the carrier put to sea on 15 March as the center ship in Task Group 21.15 (TG 21.15). Supported by five destroyer escorts of Escort Division 7 (CortDiv 7), Tripoli patrolled west of the Cape Verde Islands to break up German U-boat refuelling activities in that area.

After providing air cover for a convoy routed to the British West Indies, Tripoli's Wildcats and Avengers searched the sea lanes northwest, southwest, and west of the Cape Verdes before putting into Recife, Brazil on 5 April, to refuel and provision. Back at sea again two days later, Tripoli continued the routine of daily launchings and recoveries of her aircraft, guarding the Allied sea lanes against the incursions of enemy U-boats.

About one hour before sunrise on 19 April, one of Tripoli's Avengers made radar contact with a German U-boat as the submarine cruised on the surface awaiting the arrival of her "Milch Cow" or refuelling partner. U-513 put up a spirited anti-aircraft barrage while the Avenger made three attacks. A pattern of rockets bracketed the submarine on the first pass as the Germans prepared to dive for comparative safety. On the second run, the aircraft's depth charges failed to release, giving the enemy submersible the time she needed to dive. The U-boat evaded the aircraft's last attack - a mine - but also missed her fuelling rendezvous with U-488.

Returning to Norfolk on 29 April, Tripoli underwent voyage repairs before embarking VC-6 - 12 Avengers and nine Wildcats. She then formed up with CortDiv 7 and departed Hampton Roads on 24 May for further searches in the vicinity of the Cape Verdes. Four days out, she changed course to intercept a German submarine estimated to be proceeding southwest from a position west of the Madeira Islands. When no contact was made by 30 May, Tripoli and her consorts steamed north to rendezvous with a convoy bound for Nova Scotia.

Following her return to Norfolk on 18 June, Tripoli spent two months in carrier qualification training off Quonset Point, Rhode Island, before making port again at Norfolk on 15 July. Embarking Composite Squadron 6, she conducted two weeks of pilot qualifications in the Chesapeake Bay area before departing Hampton Roads on 1 August, bound for her new base of operations, Recife.

Screened by O'Toole and Edgar G. Chase, the escort carrier proceeded south until 1 August, when O'Toole developed a sonar contact and gave chase. Aircraft from Tripoli laid patterns of sonobuoys at the initial contact point and dropped smoke floats and float lights on an oil slick. Picking up the "scent", O'Toole straddled the floats with her Hedgehog projectiles and depth charges and soon radioed victoriously "We hit the rodent!" A brief visual examination of the evidence - debris and a large quantity of diesel oil - satisfied the hunter-killer group that they had indeed sunk an enemy submarine. However, a post-war examination of German records did not confirm the kill. As night fell, Tripoli vectored two aircraft to another sonar contact by O'Toole, and four depth bombs were dropped - keeping another U-boat down and running.

Tripoli and her group then returned to Recife on 13 August, and reported for duty with Admiral Jonas H. Ingram's 4th Fleet. Designated as the center of TG 47.7, the escort carrier put to sea on 22 August with the four destroyer escorts of CortDiv 24 to operate against a homeward-bound German submarine estimated to pass at 25° south latitude and 5° west longitude.

After a fruitless search pursuing two fading sonar contacts in the mid-South Atlantic narrows, Tripoli and her group returned to Recife on 11 September for provisioning and fuelling. Underway again two days later, TG 47.7 headed out to conduct another search - this time along the estimated track of two U-boats slated to rendezvous for refuelling. One of the target U-boats was U-1062, bound from Penang, British Malaya with a cargo of valuable petroleum products for the German war effort. Ordered to fuelU-219, outward-bound for the Far East, U-1062 prepared to rendezvous with her smaller sister boat in the South Atlantic narrows - directly in the path of the Tripoli escort group.

Passing to the westward of the Cape Verdes, TG 47.7 made rendezvous with Mission Bay's escort group to conduct a joint hunter-killer operation against the two enemy boats. Round-the-clock searches by radar-equipped Avengers continued until 40 minutes after sunset on 28 September, when an Avenger piloted by Lieutenant William R. Gillespie reported a definite contact with the surfaced U-219 only 11 miles from the enemy's estimated track.

Gillespie went in to conduct a low-level rocket attack, but was shot down by heavy flak. Another Avenger, drawn to the battle, braved the flak to conduct another rocket run and also dropped depth bombs, while a Wildcat strafed the U-boat which struggled desperately to dodge the harassing attacks by the American aircraft.

U-219 emerged from the firefight unscathed, but U-1062 did not enjoy similar good fortune. Fessenden, one of Mission Bay's screen, homed in on sonobuoy indications on 30 September and sank the "Milch Cow" with a four-charge pattern. In the meantime, U-219 was not yet home free - one of Tripoli's Avengers dropped depth bombs on the fleeing boat on 2 October. American sonar-men felt that they had definitely "killed" the U-boat, but post-war accounting showed that U-219 had escaped to Batavia, Java.

When fuel supplies ran low, Tripoli returned to Recife on 12 October. She conducted one further search of the narrows from 26 October-12 November before heading for a much-needed overhaul at Norfolk. Subsequently, the escort carrier sailed for the Pacific and, after transiting the Panama Canal and touching at San Diego, arrived at Pearl Harbor on 10 January 1945.

==== Pacific ====
Tripoli transferred Composite Squadron 8 ashore to conduct operations from Hilo, Hawaii, before she loaded a miscellaneous cargo of fighters and bombers to be offloaded at Roi, in the Marshall Islands, where she made port on 20 February 1945. Returning to Pearl Harbor after this ferry run, the escort carrier commenced training operations which would continue through the end of the war, and into late 1945. With Japan's surrender and the end of hostilities in the Pacific, Tripoli was assigned to Operation Magic Carpet.

Arriving at San Diego on 29 August, with 500 Navy veterans, Tripoli returned to Pearl Harbor on 8 September, before resuming local operations - including night carrier qualifications - through November. She subsequently made one trip with Army passengers to San Pedro, California, and a further "Magic Carpet" run to San Diego. The carrier departed the west coast on 15 January 1946, for deactivation overhaul at Norfolk. On 22 May 1946, the need for her services not required, Tripoli was decommissioned and laid up in reserve.

=== Korean War ===
The outbreak of the Korean War in the summer of 1950 resulted in the return of many of the Navy's reserve ships to active service to support American operations in the Far East. Accordingly, Tripoli was recommissioned at New York on 5 January 1952. Assigned to the Military Sealift Command (MSC), Atlantic Area, the former "hunter-killer" began her new career as an aircraft transport and ferry.

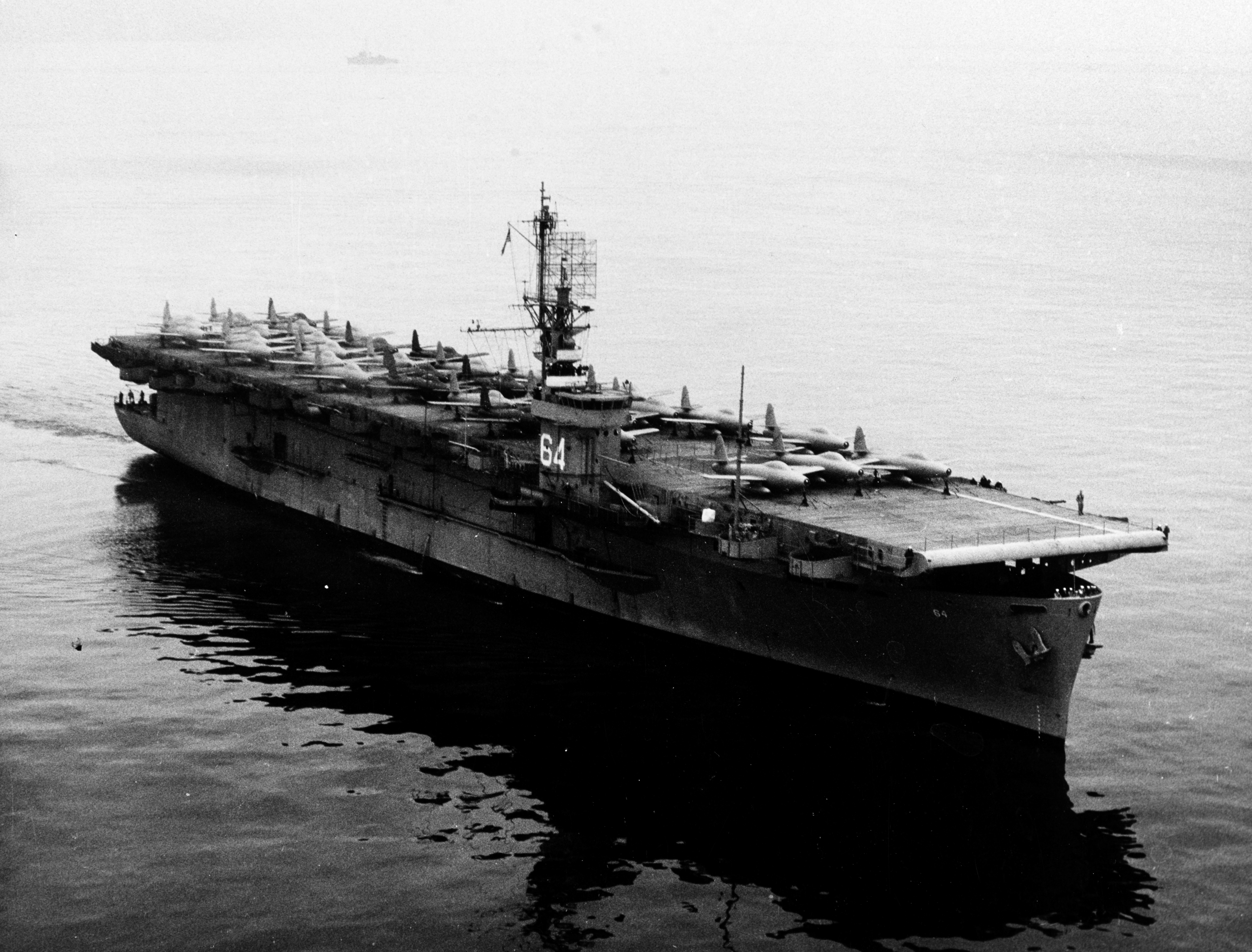
Tripoli transporting F-84 Thunderjets in the 1950s.

Over the next six years, Tripoli conducted 44 transport voyages, mostly to European and Mediterranean ports, but with one visit to Hawaii and two to the Far East. Following the ship's third voyage to Europe, Tripoli was berthed at the Port Newark Terminal on 5 August 1952, where she loaded 45 F-84 Thunderjets, 90 wingtip fuel tanks, and related gear for transport to the Far East. After going to sea on 7 August, bound for Japan, Tripoli steamed via the Panama Canal and San Diego and made port at Yokosuka with her vital cargo on 5 September, where cranes lifted the reinforcements ashore - soon to be in action in their ground-attack role in Korea. After loading battle-damaged aircraft for repairs in the United States, the carrier embarked 245 Navy and Marine Corps personnel for rotation back to Alameda Naval Air Station, California. Making port on the West Coast on 22 September, she then put to sea for the Far East a second time, once again carrying jet aircraft to Yokosuka, as well as transporting men of the Sea Echelon of Boat Unit 1. Loading a cargo of helicopters and military passengers, Tripoli returned to the west coast and arrived at Alameda on 11 November 1952. Subsequently making her sole Hawaiian voyage with the MSC, Tripoli then headed east to finish her career with transport voyages to European and Mediterranean ports.

At Alameda May 1954, fifty F-86D aircraft were loaded on board Tripoli and cocooned for a 21-day trip thru the Panama Canal to St Nazaire, France. 13 June approx 500 US Air Force personnel of the 440th FIS from Spokane WA and 441st FIS from Hamilton AFB in San Francisco, CA boarded the ship. One source identifies the units as the 496th Fighter Squadron from Hamilton AFB, and the 440th from Geiger Air Force Base. On 2 July the ship arrived at the port of St Nazaire, France. The two squadrons were bound for Landstuhl AFB, Germany.

Receiving "smart ship" awards from in the intervening years, Tripoli was reclassified a utility carrier and redesignated CVU-64 on 12 June 1955. Again redesignated T-CVU-64 on 1 July 1958, Tripoli was decommissioned at New Orleans, La., on 25 November 1958 and subsequently struck from the Naval Vessel Register on 1 February 1959. Her hull then scrapped by a Japanese firm in January 1960.
