= Arthur Gardiner =

Arthur Gardiner may refer to:

- Arthur Gardiner (politician), Australian politician
- Arthur Gardiner (Royal Navy officer)
- Art Gardiner, Major League Baseball pitcher

== See also ==
- Arthur Gardner (disambiguation)
