= 86th Airlift Wing =

US Air Force unit

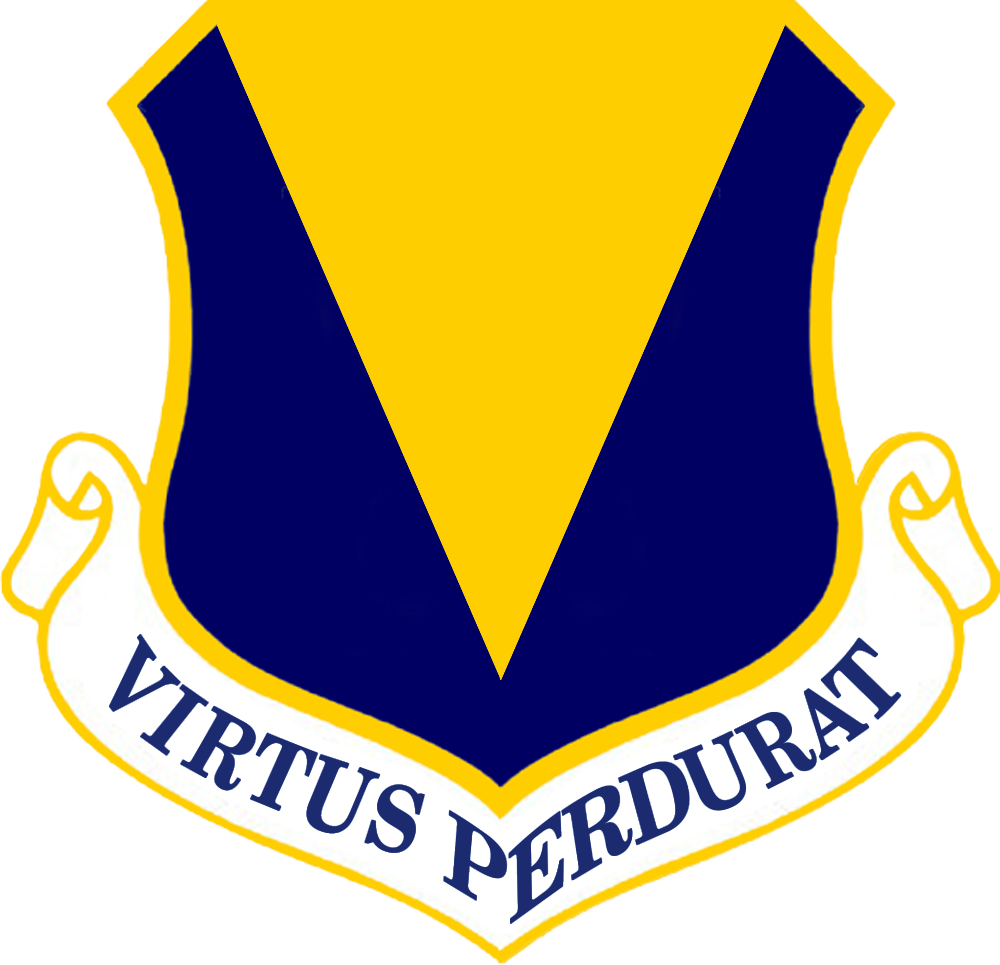
- Wing emblem
- Active: 1 July 1948–1968; 1969 – present
- Country: United States
- Branch: United States Air Force
- Type: Operational wing
- Role: Tactical airlift; Installation management
- Size: c. 9,000 personnel
- Part of: US Air Forces in Europe – Air Forces Africa (Third Air Force)
- Base: Ramstein Air Base, Germany
- Motto: Virtus perdurat (Latin for 'Enduring courage' / 'Courage will endure')
- Website: Official website

Commanders
- Current commander: Colonel Denny R. Davies
- Notable commanders: Wilbur L. Creech; Robert C. Oaks; George B. Simler

Insignia
- Tail code: RS

Aircraft flown
- Transport: C-130J Super Hercules

The 86th Airlift Wing (86 AW) is a United States Air Force wing, currently assigned to the Third Air Force, United States Air Forces in Europe – Air Forces Africa. The 86th AW is stationed at Ramstein Air Base, Germany.

The wing's primary mission is to conduct air transport, airdrop and aeromedical evacuation operations flying the C-21A, C-37A and C-130J aircraft. The 86th Airlift Wing commander also serves as the Kaiserslautern Military Community (KMC) commander, leading the largest American community outside the United States.

Originally the 86th Fighter Wing was established and activated on 1 July 1948 at Neubiberg AB, Germany.

== Units ==
The 86th Airlift Wing is currently made up of:

- 86th Operations Group (86 OG)

37th Airlift Squadron (37 AS)
76th Airlift Squadron (76 AS)
86th Aeromedical Evacuation Squadron (86 AES)
86th Operations Support Squadron (86 OSS)
424th Air Base Squadron (424 ABS) (Chièvres Air Base, Belgium)

- 86th Maintenance Group (86 MXG)

86th Aircraft Maintenance Squadron (86 AMXS)
86th Maintenance Squadron (86 MXS)

- 86th Logistics Readiness Group (86 LRG)

86th Logistics Readiness Squadron (86 LRS)
86th Material Maintenance Squadron (86 MMS)
86th Munitions Squadron (86 MUNS)
86th Vehicle Readiness Squadron (86 VRS)

- 86th Mission Support Group (86 MSG)

86th Communications Squadron (86 CS)
86th Force Support Squadron (86 FSS)
86th Security Forces Squadron (86 SFS)
569th US Forces Police Squadron (569 USFPS)
700th Contracting Squadron (700 CONS)
786th Force Support Squadron (786 FSS)

- 86th Medical Group (86 MDG)

86th Operational Medical Readiness Squadron (86 OMRS)
86th Dental Squadron (86 DS)
86th Healthcare Operations Squadron (86 HCOS)
86th Medical Support Squadron (86 MDSS)
86th Medical Squadron (86 MDS)

- 86th Civil Engineer Group (86 CEG)

86th Civil Engineer Squadron (86 CES)
786th Civil Engineer Squadron (786 CES)

- 65th Air Base Group (65 ABG) (Lajes Field, Portugal)

65th Air Base Squadron (65 ABS)
65th Civil Engineer Squadron (65 CES)
65th Communications Squadron (65 CS)
65th Comptroller Squadron (65 CPTS)
65th Force Support Squadron (65 FSS)
65th Logistics Readiness Squadron (65 LRS)
65th Operations Support Squadron (65 OSS)
65th Security Forces Squadron (65 SFS)
496th Air Base Squadron (496 ABS) (Morón Air Base, Spain)

== History ==
The 86th Fighter Group fought against Germany during the Second World War.

The 86th Fighter Wing was established and activated on 1 July 1948 at Neubiberg AB, Germany. Its initial mission was to provide air defense, primarily in West Germany with its flying group, the 86th FG.

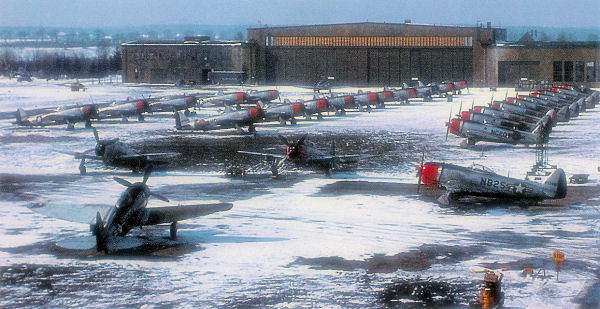
F-47D's of the 526th Fighter Squadron at Neubiberg Air Base

Equipped with P-47 Thunderbolts, the wing was one of two active USAF fighter units in Germany (the other being the 36th FG) during the immediate postwar years. Over the next several years, the 86th underwent several redesignations and several station assignments in occupied Germany. In June 1948, the 86th Fighter Wing was stationed at Neubiberg Air Base, near Munich when tensions with the Soviet Union culminated in the Berlin Blockade.

With the arrival of the jet age in Europe, USAFE wanted to move its units west of the Rhine River, as its bases in the Munich area were just a few minutes flying time from Soviet Mikoyan-Gurevich MiG-15 bases in Czechoslovakia. In February 1951, the United States and France signed an agreement in which USAF bases in their German occupation zone would be built and made available to USAFE. In late 1952, enough construction was completed at Landstuhl and the 86th Fighter-Bomber Wing was reassigned to the new base.

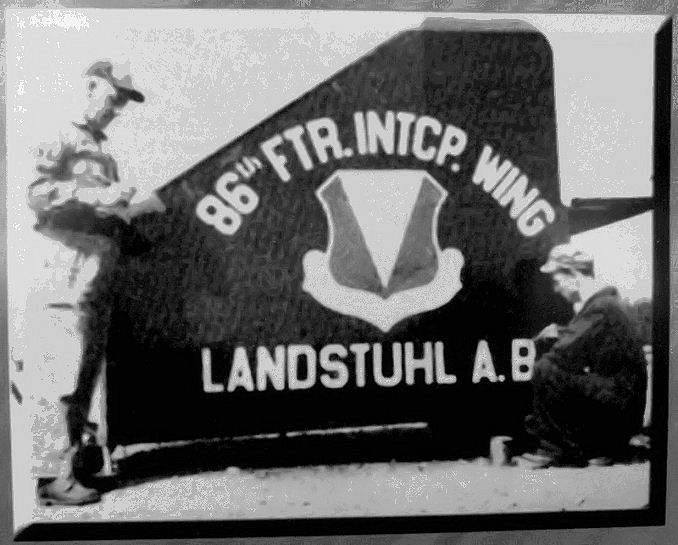
Landstuhl AB sign, 1953

The 86th Wing (under various designations) has been assigned to Ramstein for almost 60 years, with a brief period (1966–1973) being inactive or assigned to Zweibrücken Air Base.

In March 1958 the 86th Fighter-Bomber Group was inactivated and its operational squadrons were assigned to the Wing. In May, the 406th FIW at RAF Manston, England was inactivated. Its three F-86D squadrons, the 512th, 513th and 514th were reassigned to bases on the continent and were also assigned to the 86th. These squadrons were detached to the following bases:

- 512th FIS to Sembach Air Base, Germany
- 513th FIS to Phalsbourg-Bourscheid Air Base France
- 514th FIS to Ramstein (Blue tail stripes)

=== 86th Air Division (Defense) ===
In January 1959 the 525th Fighter Interceptor Squadron at Bitburg received its first Convair F-102 Delta Dagger, designed to upgrade the air defense capabilities of Western Europe. HQ USAFE decided to upgrade the 86th Fighter-Interceptor Wing and centralize command of all the European Air Defense squadrons in USAFE to it. With this change, the 86th Fighter-Interceptor Wing was redesignated the 86th Air Division (Defense) on 18 November 1960.

However at the time of their arrival in Europe, the F-102 was already being replaced by the McDonnell F-101B Voodoo and the Convair F-106 Delta Dart in the Aerospace Defense Command as an interceptor, and by much more versatile McDonnell F-4 Phantom II. On 14 November 1968 the 86th Air Division was inactivated.

=== 86th Tactical Fighter Wing ===
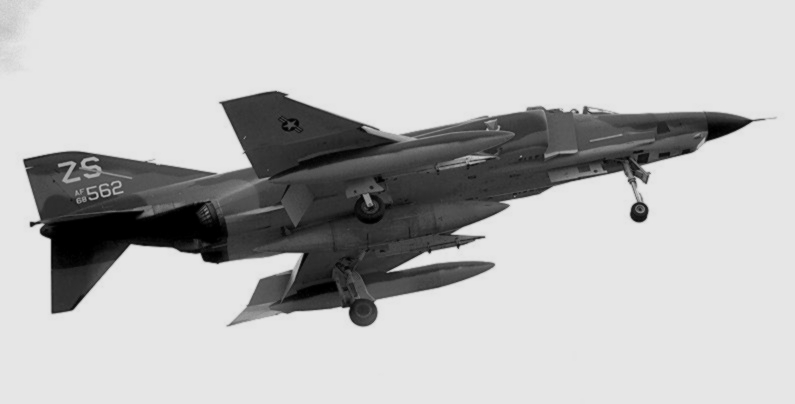
86th TFW 17th TRS McDonnell Douglas RF-4C-38-MC Phantom AF Serial No. 68-0562, 1970

In 1968 the Canadian Armed Forces announced they were downsizing their forces in Europe, and Canada's No. 3 (F) Wing left Zweibrücken Air Base, leaving the base available for USAFE. On 1 November 1969, the Air Force reactivated the 86th Tactical Fighter Wing at Zweibrücken.

It received its first flying unit, the 17th Tactical Reconnaissance Squadron, on 12 January 1970. The 17th TRS and its McDonnell Douglas RF-4C Phantom IIs was reassigned to the 86th TFW from the inactivating 66th Tactical Reconnaissance Wing at RAF Upper Heyford, England. Squadron tail code for the 17th TRS was initially "ZS", then was recoded to "ZR" in 1971.

For 18 months the 17th was the only operational squadron on the base. On 12 June 1971, the 81st Tactical Fighter Squadron with its Electronics Counter-Measures (ECM) equipped McDonnell EF-4C Phantom II "Wild Weasel" fighters was attached to the 86th TFW from the 50th TFW at Hahn AB when the 50th switched to a strike-attack role, with air defense as a secondary mission. (Note: The EF-4C designation was not official. The aircraft were officially F-4C models). The 81st TFS, however remained a part of the 50th TFW but was detached from the wing's operational control and attached to the 86th Tactical Fighter Wing for support. Squadron tail code for the 81st TFS was "ZS".

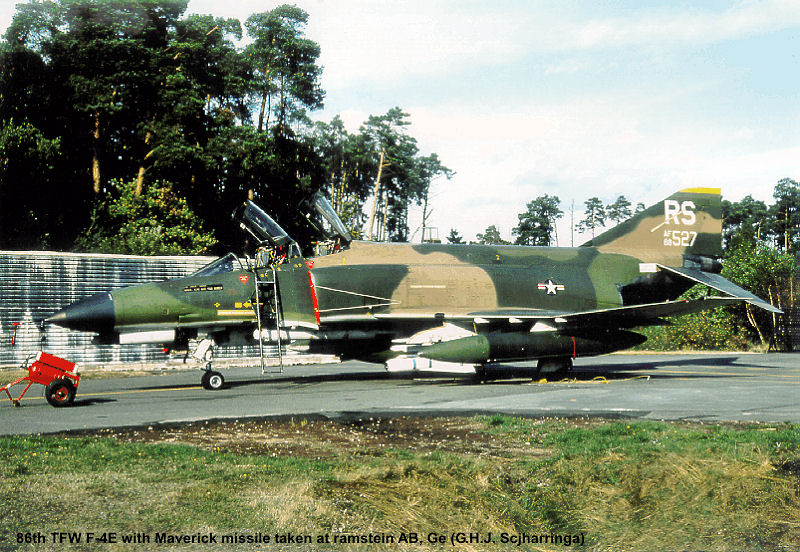
McDonnell Douglas F-4E-41-MC Phantom AF Serial No. 68-0527, 86th TFW 527th TFS

In 1972, tail codes for all 86th TFW aircraft at Zweibrücken were standardized as "ZR", per AFM 66–1, when squadron tail codes were eliminated.

However, with these reconnaissance aircraft at Zweibrücken the 86th Tactical Fighter Wing's designation did not coincide with the wing's mission. The name issue was resolved as part of a USAFE command-wide effort to realign functions and streamline operations called Creek Action.

On 15 January 1973, the 81st TFS was reassigned to Spangdahlem Air Base under operation "Battle Creek". The last of this variant of the Phantom returned to the US in 1979/1980 and was replaced by the F-4G Wild Weasel at Spangdahlem.

In addition, USAFE transferred the 26 TRW from Ramstein to Zweibrücken Air Base, Germany, and the 86th Tactical Fighter Wing (TFW) from Zweibrücken back to Ramstein on 31 January 1973. These moves were made without the transfer of personnel or equipment with the exception of the 38 TRS, 7 SOS and 81 TFS. The 38th remained under the control of the 26 TRW by moving to Zweibrücken with the wing and the 7th Special Operations Squadron was transferred to Rhein-Main Air Base. The 526th TFS remained at Ramstein AB, and it was reassigned to the 86th Tactical Fighter Wing, flying F-4Es. Its tail code was "RS".

On 22 September 1977 the newly activated 512th TFS was equipped with the 526 TFS aircraft and the 526 TFS received new planes from McDonnell Douglas St. Louis plant. The unit was designated the 86th Tactical Fighter Group and was under the 86th Tactical Fighter Wing.

With these changes, the operational squadrons of the 86th TFW in 1978 were:

- 512th Tactical Fighter Squadron (F-4E, RS, green/black tail stripe)
- 526th Tactical Fighter Squadron (F-4E, RS, red/black tail stripe)

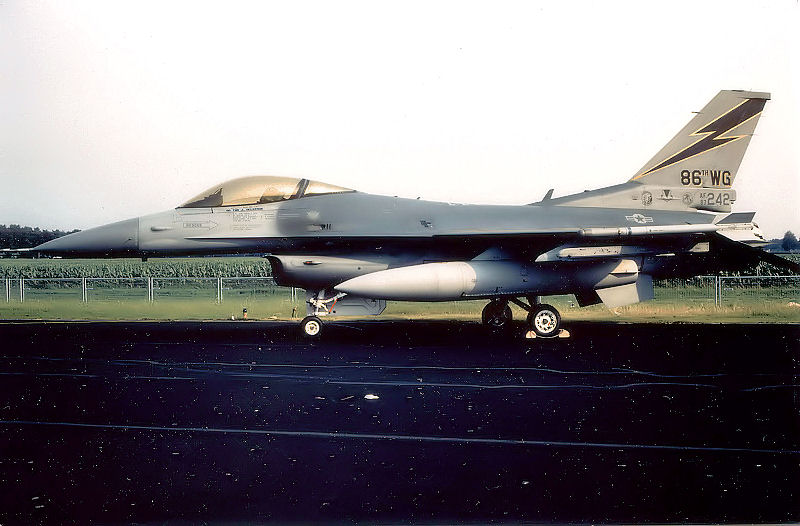
86th TFW General Dynamics F-16C Block 30F Fighting Falcon AF Serial No. 87-0242

As the wing approached its fortieth year of service in Germany, the first F-16C Fighting Falcon arrived on 20 September 1985 and the 512th TFS converted to the General Dynamics Block 25 F-16 Fighting Falcon, and the 526th retired their F-4Es in June 1986, also receiving Block 25 F-16s. The 86th TFW supported numerous military units located in the area and participated in numerous exercises that provided the wing with air combat tactics training essential to their mission.

With the rest of the world, the members of the 86th watched the Communist Bloc countries of Eastern Europe with fascination as the events of the late 1989 unfolded. When the Berlin Wall finally began to come down on 9 November 1989 and the celebrations began, many members of the Ramstein community and 86th TFW went to Berlin to see the events and take pieces of the Wall.

The 86th TFW and Ramstein had just begun to absorb the collapse of the Soviet Union and the end of the Cold War when, in August 1990, the Iraqis invaded Kuwait. Under Operation Desert Shield/Desert Storm, much to the dismay of the 86th TFW personnel, their F-16s did not deploy to the Persian Gulf like so many of its USAFE counterparts. Instead, Ramstein became an intermediate support base for American forces deployed to the Persian Gulf and, on 10 August 1990, Ramstein began receiving MAC stage crews as the base became an overflow airfield for Rhein-Main AB, supporting strategic airlift traffic to the Persian Gulf.

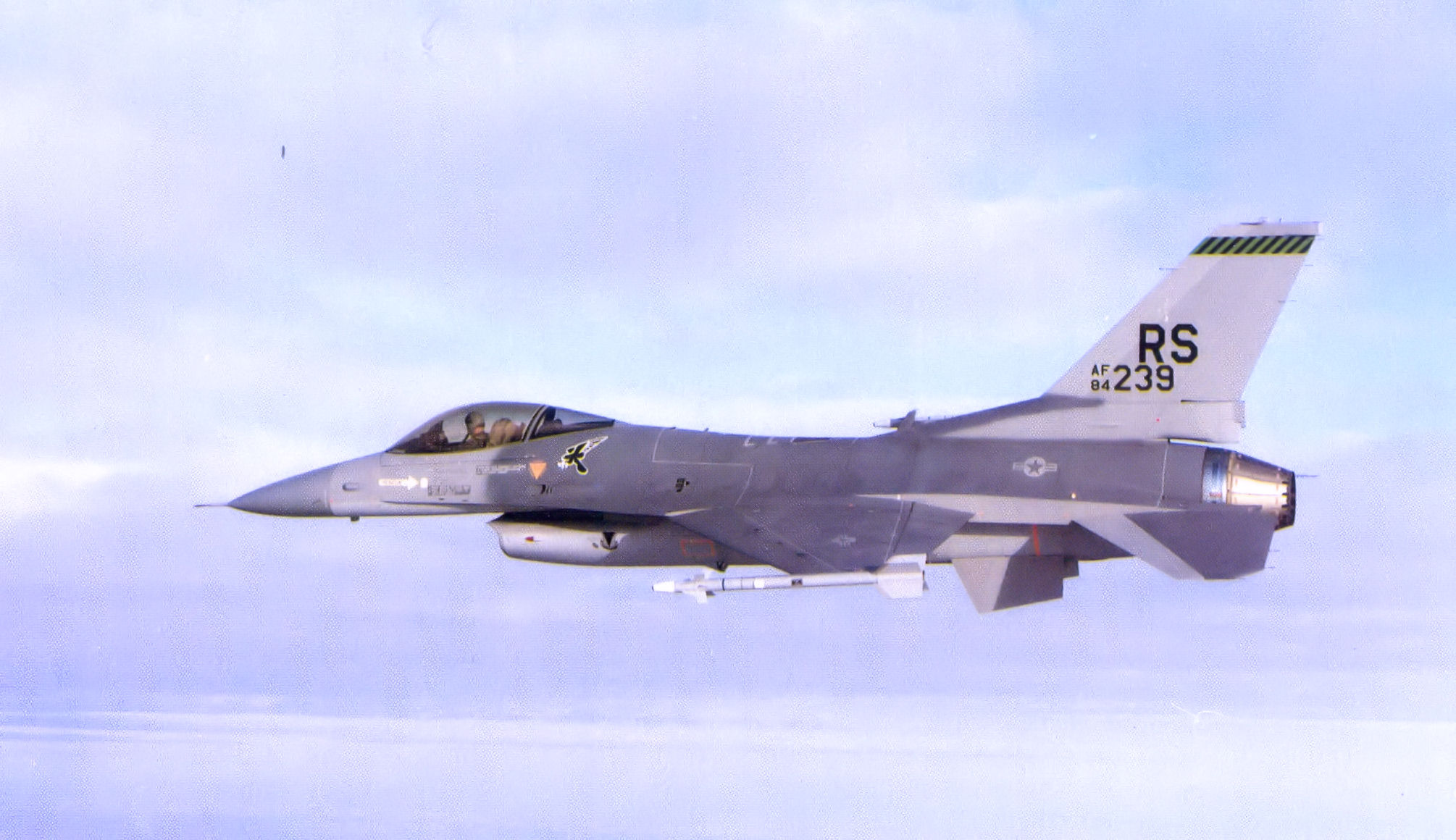
512th Tactical Fighter Squadron – F-16 84–239 1986

In addition to serving as a central overflow hub for airlift traffic flying between the US and the Arabian Peninsula, Ramstein also established an intermediate engine repair facility for deployed F-16s, became a huge collection and distribution center for gulf-bound munitions, and on 15 January 1991, Ramstein AB's aeromedical staging facility activated a 150-bed hospital and blood transshipment center in Hangar 1. The hospital provided triage to its first patients from the Persian Gulf on the same day. Additionally, personnel from virtually every squadron augmented Air Force and Army units deployed to the gulf.

With the end of Operation Desert Storm, the 86th TFW deployed to Turkey and patrolled the Iraqi No-Fly Zone(s). From 6 April 1991, when the operation began, until September 1993 when its commitment ended, the wing flew nearly 5,000 sorties over Iraq. 526th TFS aircraft twice attacked Iraqi surface-to-air missile (SAM) sites in northern Iraq. For its participation in Provide Comfort, the 86th TFW received credit in a Joint Meritorious Unit Award, though the award did little to placate the wing personnel who felt they had "missed" the war.

On 1 May 1991, the 86th TFW was redesigned the 86th Fighter Wing and underwent a complete change in its organizational structure as a test base for the USAFE Corona South wing reorganization program, an effort to "flatten" command lines and consolidate span of control. Ramstein's 316th Air Division and 377th Combat Support Wing were inactivated and all of their former functions placed under the operational control of the 86th Fighter Wing. The lessons learned at Ramstein applied to other units Air Force-wide as they converted to the new organizational structure.

=== Conversion to an airlift wing ===
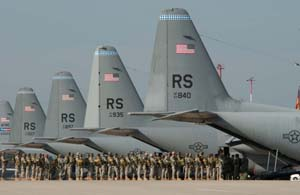
Lockheed C-130E Hercules of the 37th AS/86th Airlift Wing

The end of the Cold War brought major force structure changes throughout the Air Force, and the 86th was no exception. On 1 June 1992, the 86th Fighter Wing, which had only been equipped with F-16s, began a slow move to airlift operations when the wing took over the 58th Airlift Squadron and its small executive fleet of C-12, C-20 Gulfstream, C-21 Lear Jet, CT-43 Bobcat, C-135, and UH-1 aircraft. After gaining this airlift mission, the wing changed its designation from the 86th Fighter Wing to the 86th Wing.

In 1994 the decision was made to change the 86th Wing from a composite wing to a wing devoted to intra-theater airlift, and the 86th Wing began to assume the airlift mission previously held by C-130 Hercules aircraft at the 435th Airlift Wing at Rhein Main Air Base, Germany, which was slated for inactivation. With the influx of C-130 personnel, On 1 July, the 526th FS inactivated and its aircraft and personnel moved to Aviano Air Base, Italy to form the 555th FS.

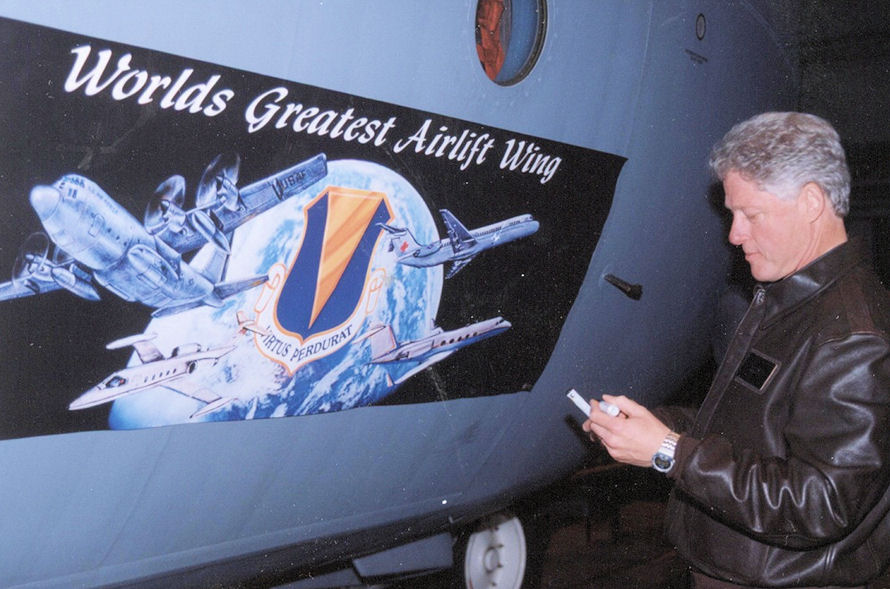
President Clinton signing the 86 AW Wing emblem.

The 512th FS was inactivated on 1 October, with its aircraft and personnel also being moved to Aviano, being assigned to the 510th FS. On 21 July 1994 the 86th Wing held a "Fighter Farewell" ceremony for the departure of its last F 16s, most to the 31st FW at Aviano AB, and the 86th Wing became the 86th Airlift Wing.

The new wing operated C-130 Hercules aircraft. On 2 November 2009 the wing completed its transition from C-130E to C-130J models.

The new 86th Airlift Wing was responsible for United States Air Forces, Europe (USAFE) intra-theater airlift throughout Europe, Africa and the Middle East, as well as supporting operations and exercises throughout the European theater. The reoriented wing's successful transition from F-16s to C-130s and its airlift support of numerous European contingencies earned it the Air Force Outstanding Unit Award for the period of 1 July 1993 to 30 June 1995, bringing the wing's total Air Force Outstanding Unit Awards to six.

==== 86th Contingency Response Group ====
By 1999, the new security environment in the Balkans showed the USAF the need for a rapid-deployment "first-in" force to secure a contingency airfield, then establish and maintain the airfield, aerial port operations, and provide force protection. In response to this need, the Air Force activated its first contingency response group, the 86th Contingency Response Group on 26 February 1999, as part of the 86th AW.

The 86th CRG had two subordinate units—the 86th Air Mobility Squadron and 786th Security Forces Squadron – and incorporated more than 30 different jobs. This new, self-contained unit became the Air Force standard for such units, and proved its utility during the Kosovo conflict.

On 5 May 1999, US president William Clinton, accompanied by Secretary of State Madeleine Albright, Secretary of Defense William Cohen, and Chairman of the Joint Chiefs of Staff Gen Henry Shelton and a large assortment of congressional delegates visited the 86th AW and Ramstein AB. During his visit, the president confirmed the 86th AW's informal motto, "The World's Greatest Airlift Wing".

==== Air Expeditionary Forces ====
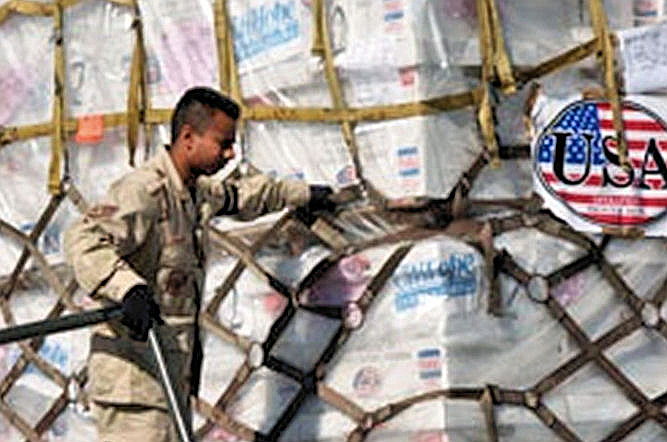
86th AW Personnel Supporting Provide Hope

On 1 January 2000, the Air Force introduced the concept of Air Expeditionary Forces, quickly known as AEFs, to respond to the increasing number of contingencies that call for worldwide deployments and to balance the burdens (and opportunities) for such deployments. The AEF concept attempted to provide some measure of "predictability", by putting Airmen either on call for deployment or actually deployed for 90 days every 15 months. The concept was intended to let all personnel know the dates of their 90-day deployment period well in advance so they could be prepared. The remaining 12 months of the 15-month AEF cycle was to be spent performing routine activities: training, participating in exercises, working on civilian or military education and spending time with their families.

The Balkans and Africa were much of the operational focus of the 86th AW in 2000. From March through April 2000, the 86th AW sent seven 37th AS C-130s and crews to Hoedspruit Airfield, Limpopo, South Africa in support of Joint Task Force Atlas Response, a relief effort in southern Mozambique and South Africa following torrential rains and flooding. The 37th flew more than 170 sorties, transporting over 600,000 pounds of cargo and 1,096 passengers.

During Atlas Response, a new capability was provided by a 37th AS C-130E, serial number 68-0938, the first USAF C-130 to undergo Keen Sage camera system modification. The Keen Sage system was mounted in a metal-encased sphere, slightly larger than a basketball, housing three sophisticated video-capture lenses—a daylight television, a 955mm fixed focal length zoom and infrared in six fields—mounted on a pallet and strapped down in the cargo hold of the Hercules. Controlled by two operators in the aircraft, the lenses scan full circle and along 90 degrees of elevation and the airborne camera operators can beam live analog video and digitally-captured still images back to a ground station, where it could be recorded and sent to relief organizations and other users. Atlas Response was the first operational deployment of a C-130 with the Keen Sage camera system, and the 37th C-130 flew 39 sorties using this new capability to search for displaced refugees so they could be provided humanitarian assistance. Eventually the wing received eight Keen Sage configured aircraft.

At the same time, members of the 86th Medical Group deployed to the nation of Cameroon for exercise MEDFLAG/Brilliant Lion. 120 doctors and medical technicians administered 20,000 immunizations and performed more than 70 surgeries, as well as delivering and distributing over 50,000 pounds of medical supplies. In August 2001, the 86th Contingency Response Group deployed to Africa as part of Operation Focus Relief, the movement and support of UN-mandated peacekeeping operations in Sierra Leone.

Beginning on 17 August 2000, the 86th Wing moved a large contingent of American soldiers to a staging base in Skopje, Macedonia, then on to Kosovo as part of NATO's Immediate Ready Force. By 31 December 2000, the 86th AW, with support from deployed C-130 units, transported 5,000 tons of cargo and 30,604 personnel to support US forces in Kosovo.

In addition to the wing's "on call" status to support any European crisis, the wing positioned aircraft and medical personnel at emergency landing fields in Spain, Morocco and Banjul for every National Air and Space Administration (NASA) Space Shuttle launch, as well as flying missions for the On-Site Inspection Agency as part of the Conventional Forces in Europe Treaty.

May 2000 was a banner month for the 86th. Air Force Chief of Staff General Mike Ryan presented the 86th Airlift Wing with the Air Force Outstanding Unit Award Ribbon for its actions from 1 September 1997, to 31 August 1999. Additionally, the 86th's C-130 squadron, the 37th Airlift Squadron "Bluetail Flies", won the 2000 USAFE Best Airlift Tanker Squadron award.

==== 2003 invasion of Iraq ====
On 16 October 2002, President Bush signed the newly passed Congressional Resolution for "Authorization for the Use of Military Force Against Iraq", beginning Operation Iraqi Freedom. As soon as this occurred, the 86th Medical Group initiated planning for a 150-bed expansion of the Landstuhl Regional Medical Center and initiated steps to prepare building 2117 (Ramstein's South Side Fitness Center) for contingency use as an Aeromedical Staging Facility. Beginning the day after the president's announcement, the 86th Maintenance Group and the 86th Logistics Readiness Squadron Traffic Management Office configured 3.4 million pounds of supplies in just 120 hours, an operation that normally took 30 days, and began moving munitions for deployment. In November 2002, 29 members of the 86th Civil Engineering Group were deployed to Ganci Air Base, Kyrgyzstan, to prepare for possible operations in Iraq.

In December, the tempo increased further. A request was sent from the Southern European Task Force requesting the 86th CRG evaluate eight airfields in northern Iraq. On 27 December, members of the Youngstown, Ohio 757th Airlift Reserve Squadron, 910th Airlift Wing, arrived to join the Selfridge, Michigan Air National Guard's 165th Airlift Squadron, and 127th AW, as part of the 86th Airlift Wing's 38th Airlift Squadron (Provisional). With the new arrivals, the combined forces of the 38th (P) Squadron was 154 personnel and four C-130 aircraft, and the unit took primary responsibility for providing airlift for forces in Bosnia-Herzegovina supporting Operation Joint Forge.

On 3 January 2003, the 86th Materiel Maintenance Squadron (MMS) began moving War Readiness Materiel (WRM) for deployment. Over the next eight months, the 86th MMS shipped 8,340 tons of WRM to 13 locations in 9 countries. By August every USAFE location that supported Operation Iraqi Freedom and Operation Enduring Freedom had received WRM from the 86th MMS. The 86th MMS also deployed seven members to various contingency locations to include Karshi-Khanabad, Uzbekistan, and Bagram, Afghanistan.

Beginning 14 February, the 37th Airlift Squadron began using its Keen Sage equipped C-130s to conduct observation missions over Iraq in preparation for possible action. The squadron flew a total of 14 missions, most at night, covering five to 15 targets per flight. To honor this rather "un-airlifty" operation, the crews gave themselves the name of the "37th Airlift Reconnaissance Squadron".

==== Iraq war operations ====
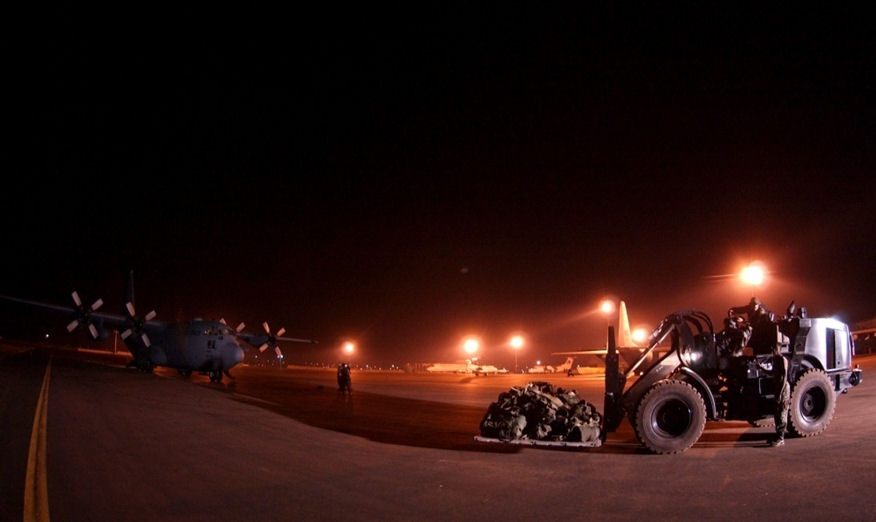
86 CRG "Opening the Base" Operations

Beginning 11 March 2003, the 86th AW's 38th Airlift (Provisional) Squadron, flying from Constanta, Romania, flew its first Operation Iraqi Freedom mission. Initially 38th (P) Squadron flew missions with just 4 aircraft, but even as these missions began help was on the way. On 3 March, the 757th Airlift Reserve Squadron, 910th Airlift Wing, Youngstown, Ohio, and the 165th Airlift Squadron, 123rd Airlift Wing, Kentucky Air National Guard, Louisville, Kentucky, were called to active duty for one year to join 38th (P) Squadron. The units arrived from 21 to 27 March, and the personnel and equipment increased 38th (P) Squadron from four C-130s and 154 personnel to ten C-130s and 306 personnel.

On 17 March, President Bush delivered an ultimatum to Saddam Hussein that he and his sons must leave Iraq within 48 hours. Saddam refused. On 20 March, the 86th Contingency Response Group went through the 86th Airlift Wing Deployment Control Center, Personnel Deployment Function, and Vehicle Deployment Function in less than three hours—a record time.

On 20 March, the Coalition began its air assault on Baghdad. The 86th AW's effort began on 27 March 2003, when 20 members of the 86th Expeditionary Contingency Response Group departed from Aviano Air Base, Italy, and parachuted into Bashur airfield in northern Iraq, to prepare the field for airlift operations. The 86th ECRG team parachuted into Bashur with 1000 "sky soldiers" of the 173rd Airborne Brigade on the largest airborne combat insertion since 1989 Operation Just Cause in Panama. The initial cadre was followed by 200 more members from the 86th ECRG and the 86th Expeditionary Air Mobility Squadron.

The 37th Airlift Squadron with its C-130E Hercules was soon involved, flying the first Hercules landing into the airfield at 2 pm on 7 April 2003. Processing through as many as five mobility lines at once, 593 members of the 86th AW deployed to Operation Iraqi Freedom by 7 April. US casualties were evacuated to Ramstein, often by 86th AW units, the 75th Airlift Squadron and the 86th Aeromedical Evacuation Squadron. By August 2003, 86th AW units had flown more than 30 medical evacuation missions back to Ramstein where, once on the ground, critical care transport teams provided acute care and managed patient transfer to the Landstuhl Regional Medical Center.

Beginning 6 April, the 86th's 37th Airlift Squadron aircraft began deliveries to the forward base in Constanta, Romania, delivering 57 tons and 58 passengers to Constanta in just seven missions conducted over the course of a week. Over the subsequent weeks, the squadron's nineteen crews continued to fly round-the-clock operations averaging 4.5 missions per day. On 14 April, the 38th (P) began to fly stage operations from Souda Bay, Crete. Their first mission into Iraq brought US Marines into Erbil in an effort to seal off the Iraq-Syrian border.

A few days later, on 17 April at Bashur, the airfield the 86th CRG had secured and opened, and the first shipment of humanitarian aid arrived destined for residents near Kirkuk, Iraq. Over 27 days of operations, the 86th Expeditionary Air Mobility Squadron received more than 370 fixed wing arrivals and departures, 4,200 personnel, and 21,500,000 pounds of cargo. By 22 April the last aircraft transited Bashur Airfield and four days later, on 26 April, the 86th Contingency Response Group Commander, Col Steven Weart, notified higher headquarters that Bashur Field, Iraq was now closed for air traffic. This was a unique occurrence—normally the 86th CRG turned its bases over for further operations. The closing marked the first time the 86th CRG closed a base it had opened.

On 3 May 2003, the 37th Airlift Squadron and 38th AS (P) established stage operations in Constanta, Romania. Flying from Constanta to Kirkuk, Iraq, the 38th Airlift Squadron (P) flew its first mission on 3 May and its last mission on 24 May, the last time the unit would fly into Iraq in support of Iraqi Freedom. On 10 July 2003, the 38th AS (P) flew its last Operation Iraqi Freedom support mission.

==== 2004 Reorganization ====
At the beginning of 2004 the 86th Airlift Wing was the largest wing in the Air Force, but its sheer size raised various management issues.

On 15 January 2004, as part of an arrangement intended to increase efficiency based on a pattern used by several units in the states, the 86th AW was split.

- The 86th AW became Ramstein Air Base's operational arm with the 86th Operations Group, the 86th Maintenance Group, 86th Air and Space Communications Group, and 86th Contingency Response Group.
- The support function was taken over by the 435th Air Base Wing, which became the overall host base unit at Ramstein, with mission support, security forces, communications, civil engineering, logistics readiness and medical groups.

==== African Mission ====
While supporting the Global War on Terrorism in the Middle East and East Asia, much of the 86th AW's focus was on Africa, which was in the US European Command (USEUCOM) area of responsibility. On 28 February 2004, C-130s from the 37th AS joined a humanitarian effort to bring supplies to Al Hoceima Province in northern Morocco. On 13 March 2005, in a "rush delivery", two C-130s from the 37th AS delivered more than 19 tons of humanitarian aid to Chad. The mission, which under normal circumstances would have taken several days to plan, was planned and the aircraft launched in less than an hour. On 6 June 2004, three 37th AS C-130s participated in a parachute drop with 13 other USAF airlifters to commemorate the 60th anniversary of D-Day.

In a two-week operation in March 2005, the 37th AS and the 86th Contingency Support Group moved 252 tons of cargo and 357 US Army soldiers into Tibuktu, Mali, in support of the Global War on Terrorism. In August 2004, the 86th AW increased it support of the Global War on Terrorism as wing personnel began to deploy as part of the Air Expeditionary Force "downrange", the euphuism for the Persian Gulf region or the areas in and around Afghanistan. Most of the Ramstein Airmen, especially aircrew, were deployed to Ali Al Salem Air Base, Kuwait, where they served as part of the 386th Air Expeditionary Wing. Many of their combat missions were flown into Bagdad International Airport and Balad Air Base, both in Iraq.

In October 2004, two C-130s from the 37th AS deployed to Kigali, Rwanda, near the Darfur region of Sudan, government organizations in the region. During the deployment the crews transported 380 African Union troops and 3,000 tons of supplies. to provide support and security to the United Nations agencies and non-government organizations in the region. During the deployment the crews transported 380 African Union troops and 3,000 tons of supplies.

In July 2005, the 86th AW deployed three C-130s from the 37th AS and about 40 personnel to Kigali, Rwanda, in support of NATO missions in Darfur, then in October returned many of the African Union troops to Rwanda. The deployment was similar to one undertaken in October 2004, and during the operation the C-130s carried the African Union troops on a thirteen-hour flight to Sudan where the African Union troops were to provide security for aid distribution operations in the area

==== The Gateway to Europe ====
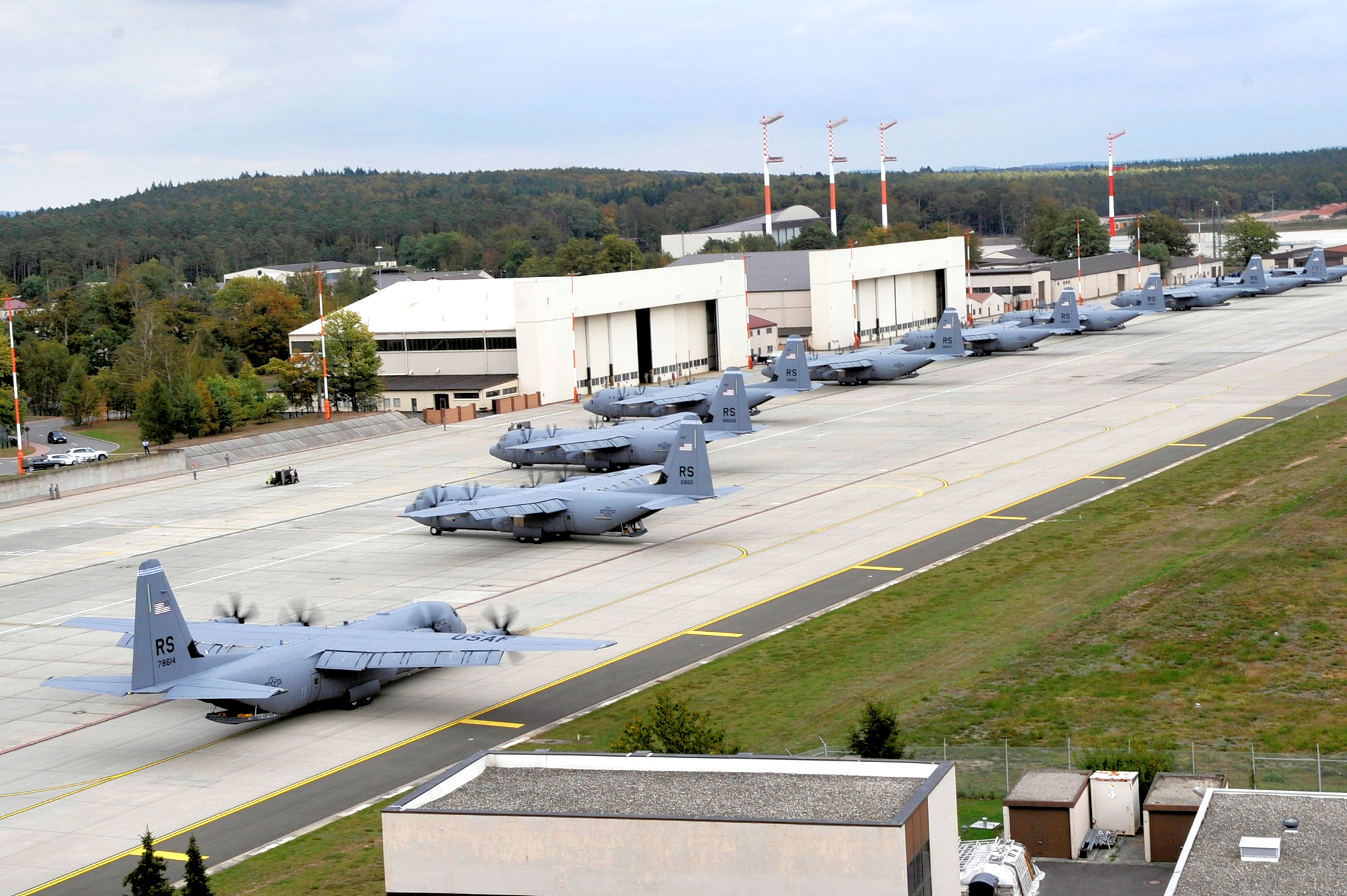
C-130J Super Hercules of the 86th Airlift Wing at their home base of Ramstein Air Base, Germany

On 10 October 2005, Rhein-Main Air Base was officially closed and Ramstein Air Base now designated "The Gateway to Europe". Another bit of good news for Ramstein came on 9 December when, to the delight of about 3,000 soccer fans partying Kaiserslautern's Stiftsplatz, it was announced that the US national soccer team would play its first-round games in the FIFA World Cup in Kaiserslautern. It was quickly decided that the US team would be quartered at Ramstein Air Base

While the 86th AW participated in numerous events in 2007, one of the most touching was a flight by one of the 38th (P) Delta Squadron's C-130s to Tripoli, Libya, which had once been home to a major American air base, Wheelus. When the United States was forced to leave, it left behind in a cemetery the remains of 72 dependents, all stillborn babies or infants. With the improving atmosphere between the governments of Libya and the United States, the 86th AW was told to proceed to the Libyan capitol, Tripoli, and recover the remains. A team led by General Johnston flew to Libya on 1 March 2007, to recover the remains, and they were returned to their families at Ramstein.

During 2007, the wing added the 496th ABS, Moron AB, Spain to the 86th OG and the 38th Construction Squadron (CST) to the 86th CRG, where it became the 86th CST. The 496th ABS was to prove especially challenging, since it was on a Spanish Eurofighter base and had a relatively small (approximately 96 personnel) US contingent and relatively little in the way of support structure. The 86th CST mainly consisted of local nationals, but there was soon a move to add a larger American contingent so it could perform operations outside of Germany.

On 11 August 2008 Russia began an invasion of its neighboring country Georgia. The 86th AW had Airmen from both the CRG and ACOMG on the ground in Georgia, and soon the 37th AS C-130Es began to fly humanitarian aid into the country while many of the 86th AW Airmen remained in place and performed their duties.

On 20 September (2008?) Major Rodolfo "Rod" Rodriguez was killed by a truck bomb in Islamabad, Pakistan, outside the Marriott Hotel. Rodriquez, a 34-year-old Air Force Academy graduate and commander of the Contingency Training Flight, 86th Construction and Training Squadron, became the first Ramstein Airman to die during the War in Afghanistan (2001-2021) and the first Ramstein Airman to die in combat since World War II.

In August 2010, the 86th Airlift Wing became a "sister wing" to Poland's 3rd Airlift Wing, the Poles having purchased some Lockheed C-130E Hercules aircraft from the United States.

The 779th Expeditionary Airlift Flight was activated in January 2008 to administer a rotational deployment of two C-17 Globemaster IIIs to be based at Ramstein AB. The exact reporting chain for the 779th EAF is not known.

== Lineage ==
- Established as 86th Fighter Wing, and activated, on 1 July 1948

Redesignated: 86th Fighter-Bomber Wing on 20 January 1950
Redesignated: 86th Fighter-Interceptor Wing on 9 August 1954
Redesignated: 86th Air Division (Defense) on 18 November 1960
Inactivated on 14 November 1968

- Redesignated: 86th Fighter-Interceptor Wing on 14 November 1968 (Unit inactive)
- Redesignated: 86th Tactical Fighter Wing on 13 October 1969

Activated on 1 November 1969
Redesignated: 86th Fighter Wing on 1 May 1991
Redesignated: 86th Wing on 1 June 1992
Redesignated: 86th Airlift Wing on 1 October 1994.

== Assignments ==
- United States Air Forces in Europe, 1 July 1948
- 2d Air Division, 10 October 1949
- Twelfth Air Force, 7 May 1951
- United States Air Forces in Europe, 1 January 1958
- Seventeenth Air Force, 15 November 1959
- United States Air Forces in Europe, 1 July 1963
- Seventeenth Air Force, 1 September 1963
- United States Air Forces in Europe, 20 May 1965
- Seventeenth Air Force, 5 October-14 November 1968, 1 November 1969
- 316th Air Division, 14 June 1985
- Seventeenth Air Force, 1 May 1991
- Third Air Force, 31 July 1996
- United States Air Forces in Europe, 1 November 2005
- Third Air Force (Air Forces Europe), 29 November 2008–present

== Components ==
Groups

- 86th Fighter (later, 86th Fighter-Bomber; 86th Fighter-Interceptor; 86th Tactical Fighter; 86th Operations)

1 July 1948 – 8 March 1958; 22 September 1975 – 14 June 1985; 1 May 1991 – present

- 86th Maintenance and Supply (later, 86th Logistics; 86th Maintenance)

1 July 1948 – 11 May 1953; 1 May 1991 – present

- U.S. Air Forces in Europe Air and Space Communications (later, 86th Air and Space Communications): January 2004 – unknown (see 1964th Communications Group)
- 86th Civil Engineering (later, 86th Civil Engineer)

1 May 1991 – 15 January 2004; 16 July 2009 – present

- 86th Contingency Response: 26 February 1999 – unknown
- 86th Logistics Readiness

27 September 2002 – 15 January 2004; 16 July 2009 – present

- 86th Medical

1 May 1991 – 15 January 2004; 16 July 2009 – present

- 86th Air Base (later, 86th Combat Support; 86th Support; 86th Mission Support)

1 July 1948 – 8 March 1958; 1 November 1969 – 14 June 1985; 1 May 1991 – 15 January 2004; 16 July 2009 – present

- 65th Air Base: 11 August 2015 – present

Assigned Squadrons

- 7th Special Operations Squadron: 31 January – 15 March 1973 (detached)
- 17th Tactical Reconnaissance Squadron: 12 January 1970 – 31 January 1973
- 32d Fighter-Interceptor Squadron: 8 April 1960 – 1 November 1968
- 81st Tactical Fighter Squadron

Attached 12 June – 14 July 1971
Assigned 15 July 1971 – 15 January 1973

- 151st Fighter-Interceptor Squadron: 25 November 1961 – 11 July 1962
- 197th Fighter-Interceptor Squadron: 25 November 1961 – 11 July 1962
- 417th Tactical Fighter Squadron: 1 October 1978 – 15 September 1987
- 440th Fighter-Interceptor Squadron:

Attached 1 July 1954 – 7 October 1955; 10 August 1956 – 7 March 1958
Assigned 8 March 1958 – 1 January 1960

- 496th Fighter-Interceptor Squadron

Attached 1 July 1954 – 7 October 1955; 10 August 1956 – 7 March 1958
Assigned 8 March 1958 – 1 November 1968

- 512th Fighter-Interceptor (later, 512th Tactical Fighter) Squadron, 24 March 1958 – 1 July 1959; 14 June 1985 – 1 May 1991
- 513th Fighter-Interceptor Squadron: 25 April 1958 – 8 January 1961
- 514th Fighter-Interceptor Squadron: 15 May 1958 – January 1961
- 525th Fighter-Interceptor Squadron

Attached 22 May 1957 – 7 October 1955; 10 August 1956 – March 1958,
Assigned 8 March 1958 – 1 November 1968

- 526th Fighter-Interceptor (later, 526th Tactical Fighter)

Attached 22 May 1954 – 7 October 1955; 10 August 1956 – 7 March 1958
Assigned 8 March 1958 – 1 November 1968; 31 January 1973 – 22 September 1975; 14 June 1985 – 1 May 1991

Attached Squadrons

- 38th Tactical Reconnaissance Squadron: attached 16–30 January 1973
- 434th Tactical Fighter Squadron: attached 30 September – 12 December 1961
- 435th Tactical Fighter Squadron: attached 22 September 1961 – 14 January 1962 and 4 November – 12 December 1962
- 436th Tactical Fighter Squadron: attached 12 January – 12 April 1962
- 476th Tactical Fighter Squadron: attached 12 April – 8 August 1962
- 527th Fighter-Day Squadron: attached 22 May 1954 – 7 October 1955

== Bases assigned ==
- Neubiberg Air Base, Germany (later West Germany), 1 July 1948
- Landstuhl Air Base, West Germany, 21 August 1952 – 14 November 1968
- Zweibrücken Air Base, West Germany, 1 November 1969
- Ramstein Air Base, West Germany (later Germany), 31 January 1973–present

== Aircraft operated ==
- P-47 Thunderbolt (1947–1950)
- F-84 Thunderjet (1950–1953)
- F-86 Sabre (1953–1960)
- F-102 Delta Dagger (1959–1968)
- F-100 Super Sabre (1960, 1975)
- F-104 Starfighter (1961–1962)
- RF-4 (1970–1973)
- F-4 Phantom II (1971–1986)
- F-16 Fighting Falcon (1985–1991)
- C-9 Nightingale (1993–2003)
- C-20 (1993– )
- C-21 Learjet (1993– )
- C-37 (2010– )
- Boeing C-40 Clipper (2004– )
- C-130 Hercules (1993– )

== Awards and decorations ==
- Air Force Outstanding Unit Award with Combat "V" Device (15 Jan 2004 – 31 Oct 2005)
- Air Force Outstanding Unit Award (13x)

== List of commanders since 2016 ==
- Brig Gen Jon T. Thomas, June 2015 – August 2016
- Brig Gen Richard G. Moore, August 2016 – August 2018
- Brig Gen Mark R. August, August 2018 – August 2020
- Brig Gen Joshua M. Olson, August 2020 − July 2022
- Brig Gen Otis C. Jones, July 2022 – May 2024
- Brig Gen Adrienne L. Williams, May 2024 – June 2026
- Col Denny R. Davies, June 2026 – present

== See also ==
- List of wings of the United States Air Force
