= 440th Fighter-Interceptor Squadron =

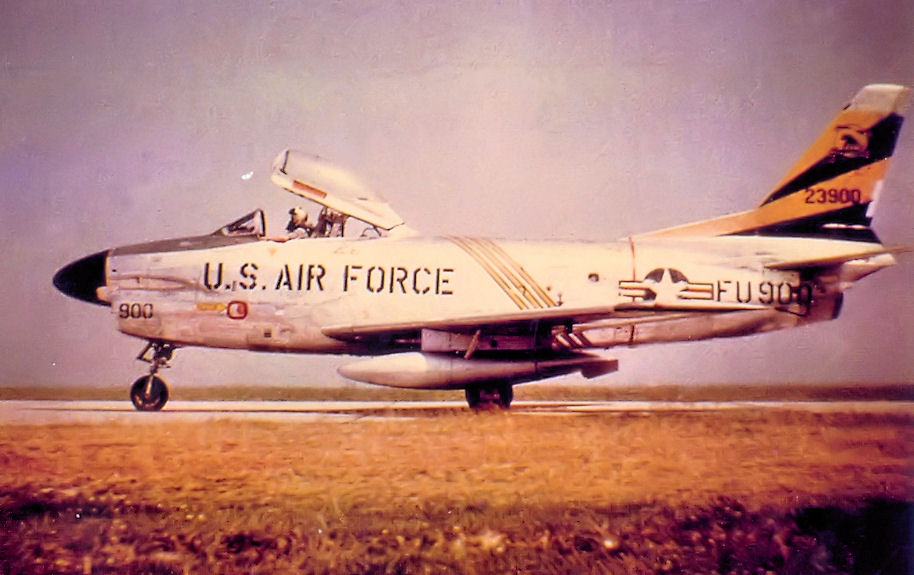
- Squadron F-86D Sabre (Note: Aircraft is North American F-86D-45-NA Sabre, serial 52-3900.)
- Active: 1943–1944; 1953–1960
- Country: United States
- Branch: United States Air Force
- Role: Fighter-Interceptor
- Nickname(s): Mad Dogs

Insignia
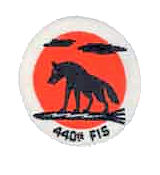
- Patch with 440th Fighter-Interceptor Squadron emblem (Note: Approved 9 July 1954.)

The 440th Fighter-Interceptor Squadron is an inactive United States Air Force unit. Its last assignment was with the 86th Fighter-Interceptor Wing at Erding Air Station, Germany, where it was inactivated on 1 January 1960. The squadron served as a NATO air defense unit from February 1953. The squadron was originally established as a Replacement Training Unit during World War II in February 1943, but was disbanded when the Army Air Forces reorganized its training units in 1944.

== History ==
=== World War II ===
The squadron was first activated as the 440th Fighter Squadron at Sarasota Army Air Field, Florida in 1943 when the 337th Fighter Group expanded from three to four squadrons. It served as a III Fighter Command North American P-51 Mustang Replacement Training Unit. The squadron was disbanded in May 1944 and its personnel and equipment transferred to the 341st AAF Base Unit (Replacement Training Unit, Fighter).

=== European air defense ===
Reactivated in 1953 as a North American F-86D Sabre interceptor squadron. Moved to West Germany, attached to the 86th Fighter-Bomber Wing at Landstuhl Air Base. The squadron moved to Erding Air Base in Bavaria, operating as a forward-deployed squadron near the Czech border until inactivated in January 1960 with the withdrawal of the F-86D from West Germany.

== Lineage ==
- Constituted as the 440th Fighter Squadron, Single Engine 12 February 1943

Activated on 24 February 1943
Disbanded on 1 May 1944

- Reconstituted, and redesignated 440th Fighter-Interceptor Squadron on 3 February 1953

Activated on 18 February 1953
Inactivated on 1 January 1960

=== Assignments ===
- 337th Fighter Group, 24 February 1943 – 1 May 1944
- 530th Air Defense Group, 18 February 1953
- Twelfth Air Force (attached to 86th Fighter-Bomber Wing), 1 July 1954
- 7486th Air Defense Group (later 7486th Air Base Group), 2 December 1954
- 86th Fighter-Interceptor Group, 3 January 1956
- 86th Fighter-Interceptor Wing, 8 March 1958 – 1 January 1960

=== Stations ===
- Sarasota Army Air Field, Florida, 24 February 1943
- Pinellas Army Air Field, Florida, 15 April 1943 – 1 May 1944
- Geiger Field, Washington, 18 February 1953
- Landstuhl Air Base, Germany, 4 July 1954
- Erding Air Base, Germany, 17 February 1956 – 31 December 1959

=== Aircraft ===
- Curtiss P-40 Warhawk, 1943–1944
- North American P-51 Mustang, 1944
- North American F-86D Sabre, 1953–1960
