= Pier Terrace, West Bay =

Grade II listed building in West Bay, Dorset

Coordinates: 50.7102°N 2.7634°W

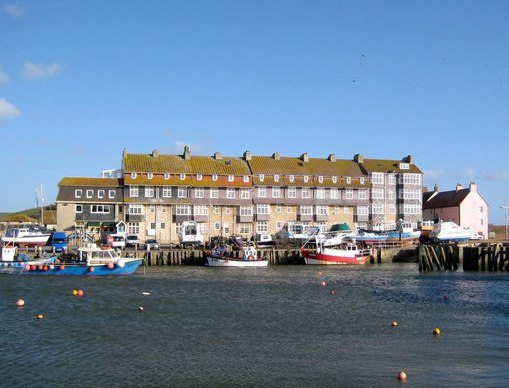
Pier Terrace

The Pier Terrace in West Bay, Dorset, was designed by the English Arts and Crafts architect Edward Schroeder Prior in 1884–85. It is a Grade II listed building.

Pier Terrace is one of Prior's most important early buildings. The influence of Norman Shaw, particularly his Sisters of Bethany Convent, is still apparent in the double pitched tiled roof, stepped rhythm, tile hanging and bay windows of the terrace. However the terrace's design had much derived from West Country vernacular architecture by comparison to Prior's initial, unfulfilled designs for cottages and a hotel at West Bay.

Prior's interest in materials and his understanding of their use in combination with experiments in volume and massing came to the fore at West Bay, anticipating his later mature work. He used materials carefully, with bands of differing textures and materials emphasising the horizontal plain, breaking up the massive warehouse like volume of the building. The combination of experimentation with volumes, such as cutting the entrance arches out of the eastern facade and materials, the overhanging storeys, projecting eaves and bays demonstrate Prior's interest in the play of light and his understanding of shadow.

The Great Western Railway reached Bridport in 1857 resulting in the decline of Bridport Harbour and its renaming as West Bay. Local businessmen, including the archaeologist Augustus Pitt-Rivers and the Earl of Ilchester, funded an extension of the line to the harbour, being the Bridport Railway which was completed by 1883. Subsequently, they established the West Bay Building Company to build villas and lodging houses for visitors. Two of Prior's cousins were on the board and it was as a consequence of this that Prior became involved, initially designing proposals for cottages, lodging houses a hotel and the “Lost Sailor” tap room, all in a Shavian idiom. However the scheme was blocked by General Pitt-Rivers who would not release the land on the East Cliff at a reasonable price. As a result, proposals were drawn up for a terrace on land owned by the Harbour Commissioners.

The terrace of 10 lodging houses, providing 60 bedrooms, faces east and west. Each house had a semi-basement kitchen, scullery and living room for the landlady. The first floor held a living room and two bedrooms, with a further living room, bedroom and WC on the second floor. The attic contained one large and two small bedrooms.

The terrace was divided into three stepped blocks of four, four and two houses. The ground and first floor are constructed from Portland stone separated by a narrow sting course. There are a series of tile-hung second floor bay windows to the west facade, with four low semi-circular arched entrances providing shared access for every pair of houses on the ground floor to the east facade. The second floor is jettied out from the first. To the western front a continuous slate hung roof overhangs the bays of the first floor; a finish also applied to the second floor wall to this facade. The eastern facade of the second floor is rough cast and overhangs the first and ground floors. The attic story is extended out over the second storey and is tile hung with small dormer windows with splayed lights tucked under the eaves of the main roof. The massive roof was tiled with Taylor's patent red roof tiles.

The two southern houses burnt down in 1929 and were reconstructed as flats with four storey bays to the western elevation. In 1973 the next four houses were badly damaged by fire but were sympathetically restored. An extension was constructed to the north in the 1970s with vaguely sympathetic tile hanging, though the general design is not good. Some partial re-roofing has now been carried out in smaller red tiles that break up the surface effect of the roof.
