= Pinellas Army Air Field =

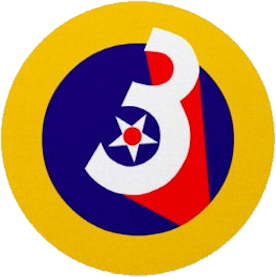
Pinellas Army Airfield
- Part of Third Air Force
- Located near: St. Petersburg, Florida
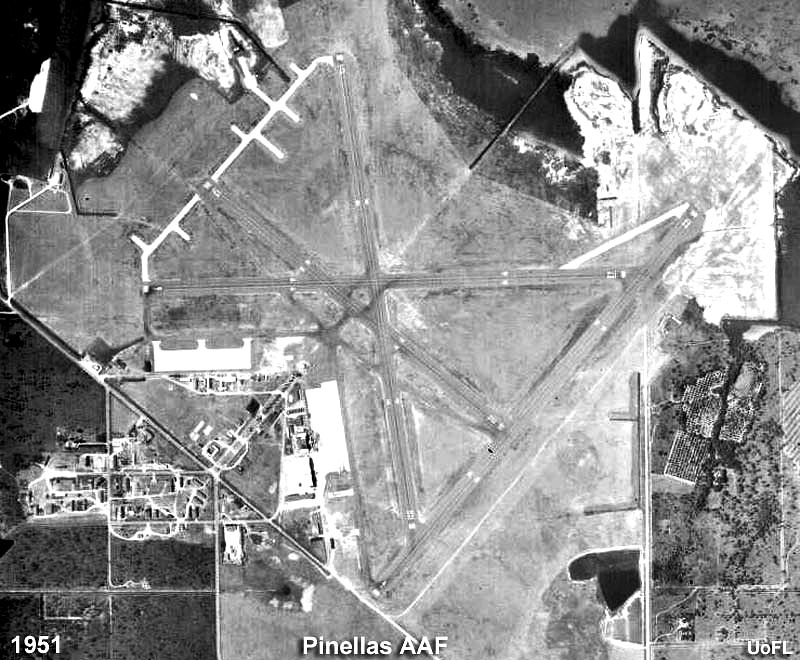
- Pinellas Army Airfield – 1951

Location
- Location within Florida
- Coordinates: 27°54′34″N 082°41′17″W

Site history
- In use: 1942–1945

Pinellas Army Airfield was a United States Army Air Forces installation during World War II, located 9.8 miles northwest of St. Petersburg, Florida.

== History ==
Constructed on the site of the Pinellas County Municipal Airport, construction of the airport at its present site started in March 1941. It was established chiefly for the purpose of training newly graduated pilots in the art of combat flying. It was activated on 9 April 1942, being placed under the jurisdiction of Third Air Force, III Fighter Command, and was assigned to Sarasota Army Airfield as a sub-base.

The first operational flying squadron assigned to Pinellas AAF was the 304th Fighter Squadron, arriving on 30 August 1942. The 440th was equipped with P-39 Airacobras, and was assigned to the 337th Fighter Group at Sarasota AAF. During its first year of operations, the squadron also received some P-43 Lancers for the training mission. In April 1943, the 440th Fighter Squadron was moved from Sarasota AAF and became a second training squadron at Pinellas AAF. With the arrival of the 440th, both squadrons were equipped with Curtiss P-40 Warhawks as trainers. As many as 1,500 Third Army Air Force trainees, could be found at this site at any one time.

Trainees received practical experience in aerial combat maneuvering, air-to-air and air-to-ground gunnery, and dive bombing techniques. On 1 May 1944, both the 304th and 440th Fighter Squadrons were inactivated as a result of the numbered training units in the Zone of the Interior (ZI) (i.e., Continental United States) being re-designated in an administrative reorganization by HQ Army Air Force. They were replaced by the Pinellas Replacement Unit (Fighter, Single-Engine), with the fighter squadrons being re-designated as "A" and "B" squadrons. Later in 1944, the P-40s were replaced by newer P-51 Mustangs when they became available for training.

On 1 October 1944, Pinellas Army Airfield stood up as a fully operational III Fighter Command Base under the control of nearby Drew Army Airfield in Tampa. The mission of the base was expanded to include the III Fighter Command Gunnery School, the III Fighter Command Instructors School, and the III Fighter Command Rocket School. These new schools, in addition to the Fighter Replacement Unit, came under the command of the 341st Army Air Forces Base Unit.

With the end of the European War in May 1945, the pace of training replacement pilots slowed down during the summer months. On 24 June 1945 a hurricane hit the Tampa area and training was temporarily suspended, the aircraft being evacuated out of the area. The hurricane damaged some buildings but training was resumed in a few days. Over the Independence Day holiday in July 1945, the base held its first open house, with thousands of local residents welcomed onto the base, seeing a display of fighter aircraft and other planes flown in from Third Air Force bases. Acrobatic displays of flying were performed.

=== Closure ===
With the sudden Japanese surrender in early August 1945, orders were received from III Fighter Command that training of replacement pilots was to end. Pilots already in training were allowed to complete their training, however no new trainees would arrive. By the end of August, the students were being reassigned to other bases and the number of base support personnel was being reduced at a rapid rate.

In late September 1945, Headquarters, Third Air Force sent orders to Pinellas AAF announcing that the base would be inactivated as of 30 November 1945 and be transferred to Air Technical Service Command in a standby status. Under ATSC, buildings and equipment were sold and any useful military equipment was transferred to other bases around the country. The base was declared as surplus in 1946 and was turned over to the War Assets Administration (WAA) for disposal and return to civil use.

=== Current use ===
The airport was subsequently returned to Pinellas County. It was stipulated that the airport must continue be used as an airport for aviation purposes, and if not, that it be returned to the U.S. Government. Today, the airport is St. Petersburg-Clearwater International Airport, a joint civil-military commercial airport that is also home to Coast Guard Air Station Clearwater and, until 2022, a U.S. Army Reserve Army Aviation Support Facility.

A plaque was dedicated at the St. Petersburg-Clearwater International Airport passenger terminal in 1994 by the P-51 Fighter Pilots Association and Brigadier General James H. Howard, USAF (Ret), the only European Theater fighter pilot to be awarded the Medal of Honor in World War II and the last wartime base commander of Pinellas Army Airfield.

=== Major units assigned ===
- 304th Fighter Squadron, 30 August 1942 – 1 May 1944
- 440th Fighter Squadron, 15 April 1943 – 1 May 1944
- Pinellas Replacement Training Unit (Fighter, Single Engine), 1 May 1944 – 30 September 1945
- III Fighter Command Rocket School, 1 December 1944 – 30 September 1945
- 77th Troop Carrier Squadron, 18 August 1956 – 16 November 1957 (Not equipped)

== See also ==
- Florida World War II Army Airfields
