= Robert Carkett =

British Royal Navy captain

Captain Robert Carkett
- Died: 1780
- Occupation: Royal Navy captain

Robert Carkett (died 1780) was a British Royal Navy captain.

== Biography ==
Carkett seems to have entered the navy in 1734 as able seaman on board the Exeter. In her, and afterwards in the Grampus and Alderney sloops, he served in that capacity for upwards of four years, when he was appointed to the Plymouth as midshipman. In that ship, then belonging to the Mediterranean fleet, he remained for nearly five years, and during the latter part of the time under the command of Captain G.B. Rodney. He passed his examination on 18 July 1743, sailed for the East Indies in the Deptford in May 1744, was made lieutenant in the following February, and returned to England in September 1746. During the rest of the war he served in the Surprise frigate, and in March 1755 was appointed to the Monmouth, a small ship of 64 guns, which, after two years in the Channel, was, early in 1767, sent out to the Mediterranean under the command of Captain Arthur Gardiner. In the early part of 1758 the squadron under Vice-admiral Osborn was blockading Cartagena. On the evening of 28 February the Monmouth chased the French 80-gun ship Foudroyant out of sight of the squadron, and single-handed brought her to action. About nine o'clock Gardiner fell mortally wounded, and the command devolved on Carkett as first-lieutenant, who continued the light with equal spirit. Both ships were beaten nearly to a standstill, when the Swiftsure of 70 guns came up about one o’clock in the morning, and the Foudroyant surrendered. Carkett was immediately promoted by the admiral to command the prize, and a few days later appointed to the Revenge, which he took to England. His post rank was dated 12 March; and he continued in command of the Revenge, in the Downs, till the following February. He was then appointed to the Hussar frigate, and commanded her at home and in the West Indies till 23 May 1762, when she struck on a reef off Cape Français of St. Domingo, and was lost, her officers and men becoming prisoners of war. In June Carkett and the other officers were sent to England on parole, but he was not exchanged till the following December. In August 1763 he commissioned the Active, which he commanded in the West Indies, and most of the time at Pensacola, till 1767, in June of which year she was paid off at Chatham. In July 1769 he commissioned the Lowestoft, and again spent the greater part of his time at Pensacola, where his duties seem to have been promoting the welfare of the settlement and cultivating vegetables. His gardening was interrupted for a short time in 1770 by the death of Commodore Forrest, in consequence of which he had to undertake the duties of senior officer at Jamaica; but on being superseded by Commodore Mackenzie he returned to Pensacola, and remained there for the next three years. The Lowestoft was paid off in May 1773.

In November 1778 Carkett was appointed to command the Stirling Castle of 64 guns, and in December sailed for the West Indies in the squadron under Commodore Rowley. He thus in the following summer had his share of the clumsily fought action off Grenada, and on 17 April 1780 led the line in the action to leeward) of Martinique. Of Carkett's personal courage there can be no doubt, but his experience with fleet was extremely small, and of naval tactics he knew nothing beyond the rule for the line of battle laid down in the fighting instructions. When, therefore, Rodney, after directing the attack to be concentrated on the enemy's rear, made the signal to engage, Carkett in the Stirling Castle stretched along to engage the enemy van. Rodney wrote to the secretary of the admiralty on 26 April 1780 that his error had been fatal to the success of the action. This clause of Rodney's letter was not published in the ‘Gazette,’ but Carkett learned from England that something of the sort had been sent. He accordingly wrote to Rodney desiring to see that part of it which related to him. ‘All the satisfaction I received,' he complained to the secretary of the admiralty on 23 July 1780, ‘was his acknowledgment that he had informed their lordships that I had not properly obeyed his signals in attacking the enemy rear’ (Beatson, Nav. and Mil. Memoirs, vi. 222). Rodney's letter did in fact, contain a very severe reprimand, of which Carkett made no mention, but requested the secretary of the admiralty to lay his explanation before their lordships. Whether he ever received an answer is doubtful, for the Stirling Castle, which had been sent to Jamaica, and thence ordered home with the trade, was, in a violent hurricane on 5 October, totally lost on Silver Keys, some small rocks to the north of Cape Français. All onboard perished, with the exception of a midshipman and four seamen.
