= C-20 Gulfstream =

The United States military has designated two aircraft versions as the C-20 Gulfstream:

- The Gulfstream III, designated the C-20A/B/C/D/E in military service.
- The Gulfstream IV, designated the C-20F/G/H in military service.
