= USS O'Toole (DE-527) =

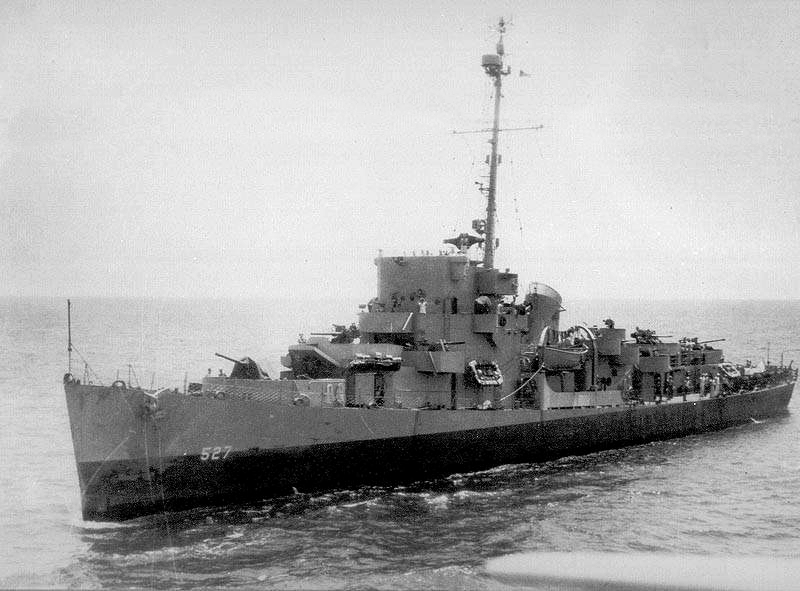
- O'Toole underway at sea on 27 April 1944

History

United States
- Name: USS O'Toole
- Laid down: 25 September 1943
- Launched: 2 November 1943
- Commissioned: 22 January 1944
- Decommissioned: 18 October 1945
- Stricken: 1 November 1945
- Fate: Sold for scrapping, 1946

General characteristics
- Type: Evarts-class destroyer escort
- Displacement: 1,140 long tons (1,158 t) standard; 1,430 long tons (1,453 t) full
- Length: 289 ft 5 in (88.21 m) o/a; 283 ft 6 in (86.41 m) w/l
- Beam: 35 ft 2 in (10.72 m)
- Draft: 11 ft (3.4 m) (max)
- Propulsion: 4 × General Motors Model 16-278A diesel engines with electric drive, 6,000 shp (4,474 kW); 2 screws
- Speed: 19 knots (35 km/h; 22 mph)
- Range: 4,150 nmi (7,690 km)
- Complement: 15 officers and 183 enlisted
- Armament: 3 × single 3"/50 Mk.22 dual purpose guns; 1 × quad 1.1"/75 Mk.2 AA gun; 9 × 20 mm Mk.4 AA guns; 1 × Hedgehog Projector Mk.10 (144 rounds); 8 × Mk.6 depth charge projectors; 2 × Mk.9 depth charge tracks

USS O'Toole (DE-527) was an Evarts-class destroyer escort of the United States Navy during World War II. She served in the North Atlantic Ocean protecting convoys and other ships from German U-boats and aircraft. She also performed escort and anti-submarine operations before returning home at the end of the conflict.

== Design ==
The Evarts-class destroyer escorts were 289 ft 5 in (88.21 m) long overall, and they had a beam of 35 ft 2 in (10.72 m). They had an average draft of 10 ft 1 in (3.07 m) at their full load displacement of 1,416 long tons (1,439 t). Each ship had a normal crew numbered 156 officers and sailors.

O'Toole was propelled by a pair of diesel motors manufactured by General Motors, which drove a pair of screw propellers. Her propulsion system was rated to produce 6,000 brake horsepower (4,500 kW) for a top speed of 19.5 knots (36.1 km/h; 22.4 mph). Oil storage amounted to between 131 and 197 long tons (133 and 200 t), which allowed a cruising radius of up to 6,000 nautical miles (11,000 km; 6,900 mi) at an economical pace of 10 knots (19 km/h; 12 mph).

The ship's armament consisted of a main battery of three 3-inch (76 mm) /50-caliber guns in individual pivot mounts, which could be used against air or surface targets. These were supported by a light anti-aircraft battery that initially consisted of four 1.1 in (28 mm) /75-caliber guns in a quadruple mount and nine 20 mm (0.79 in) Oerlikon guns. For attacks against submarines, the ship was equipped with a Hedgehog mortar, eight depth charge throwers, and two depth charge racks.

== Service history ==
O'Toole was laid down at the Boston Navy Yard on 25 September 1943. Named for John O'Toole, an officer killed during Operation Torch, the ship was launched on 2 November 1943, and was sponsored by O'Toole's widow. The ship was commissioned on 22 January 1944.

Following shakedown off Bermuda, O'Toole served as a training ship for the Fleet Sound School, Key West, Florida. Detached on 15 July, she sailed north to Casco Bay, thence proceeded south to Norfolk, Virginia, to escort Tripoli (CVE-64) to Recife, Brazil. Escorting Solomons (CVE-67) on the return voyage, she arrived at Norfolk, on 25 August, and continued on to New York City where she joined CortDiv 80 for transatlantic convoy duty.

On 9 September, O'Toole stood out of New York Harbor on her first escort of convoy mission. Acting as communication liaison ship between Commander, Task Group 27.5 and convoy NY 119, she shepherded the small craft convoy to the Azores, thence to Falmouth, England, arriving on 18 October. On 8 November she departed for Reykjavík as escort to Abnaki (ATF-96). From Iceland she proceeded to Norfolk, Virginia, and New York, where she rejoined CortDiv 80. In mid-December the escort sailed with convoy UGS 64 for North Africa, returning on 23 January 1945. Completing another Mediterranean run in April, she was en route home from Algeria when the war in Europe ended.

Arriving at New York on 23 May, she operated off the New England coast until mid-July when she proceeded to Miami, Florida, for a brief tour as school ship. In September, she moved north, reporting for inactivation at Charleston, South Carolina, on the 10th. Her final commander was Lt. Comdr. Lanson B. Ditto. Decommissioned at Charleston on 18 October, she was struck from the Navy List on 1 November, and scrapped in March 1946.
