= 496th Tactical Fighter Squadron =

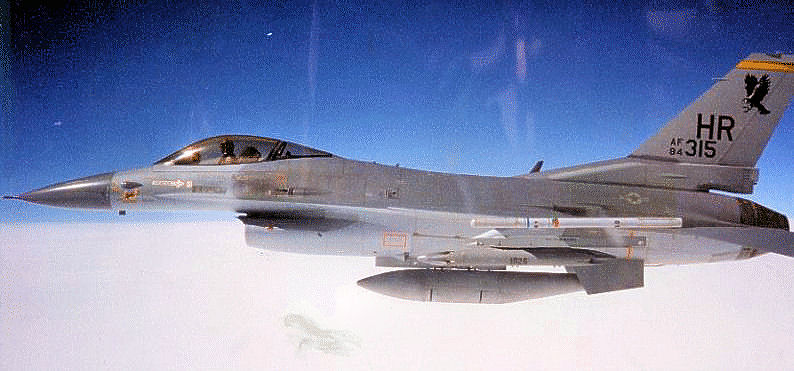
- 496th TFS F-16 Fighting Falcon (Note: Aircraft is General Dynamics F-16C Block 25E Fighting Falcon, In the Mood, serial 84-1315. After serving with the Air National Guard, it was transferred to the Aerospace Maintenance and Regeneration Center on 16 October 2008. Dirkx, Marco (20 May 2025). "1984 USAF Serial Numbers". Joe Baugher’s Serial Number List.)
- Active: 1942–1944; 1949–1951; 1953–1991
- Country: United States
- Branch: United States Air Force
- Role: Fighter
- Motto: Cave Canem (Latin for 'Beware of the Dog')
- Decorations: Air Force Outstanding Unit Award

Insignia
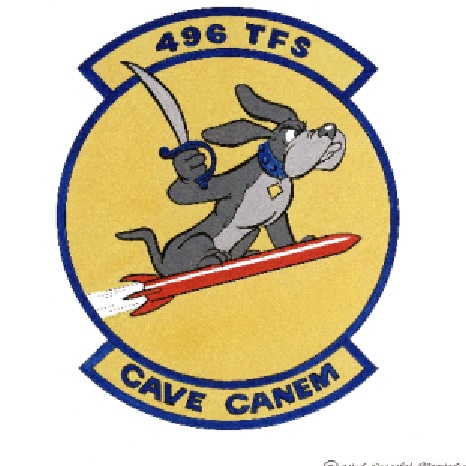
- 496th Tactical Fighter Squadron emblem

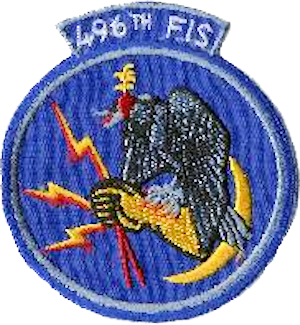
- Patch with 496th Fighter-Interceptor Squadron emblem (Note: Approved 2 November 1960. Description: On an Air Force blue disc, bordered white, fimbriated Air Force blue, an Air Force golden yellow increscent moon in sinister surmounted by an Air Force golden yellow gauntleted hand fesswise couped, the hand clenched and grasping the jesses of a white falcon in profile perched on the wrist, hooded, jessed and varvelled red, an Air Force golden yellow plume atop the falcon's hood; radiating from the hand to dexter three Air Force golden yellow lightning flashes edged red; outlines and details black throughout.)

The 496th Tactical Fighter Squadron is an inactive United States Air Force unit, last assigned to the United States Air Forces in Europe, 50th Tactical Fighter Wing, at Hahn Air Base, Germany, where the squadron was inactivated on 15 May 1991.

The unit was first activated as the 301st Bombardment Squadron in 1942, and served until April 1944 as a replacement and operational training unit for light bombardment and. later, as the 496th Fighter-Bomber Squadron, fighter-bomber units and crews. It was disbanded in a reorganization of training units by the Army Air Forces, It was again active as the 496th Fighter All-Weather Squadron, a reserve unit, from 1949 to 1951, flying the aircraft of the regular 52d Fighter-All Weather Group until it was called to active duty for the Korean War and its personnel used to fill out other units.

Its longest period of active duty started in 1953, when it was activated as the 496th Fighter-Interceptor Squadron. After training in the Western United States, it moved to Germany, serving in the air defense of Western Europe until 1968, when it became the 496th Tactical Fighter Squadron and added the tactical fighter mission.

== History ==
=== World War II ===
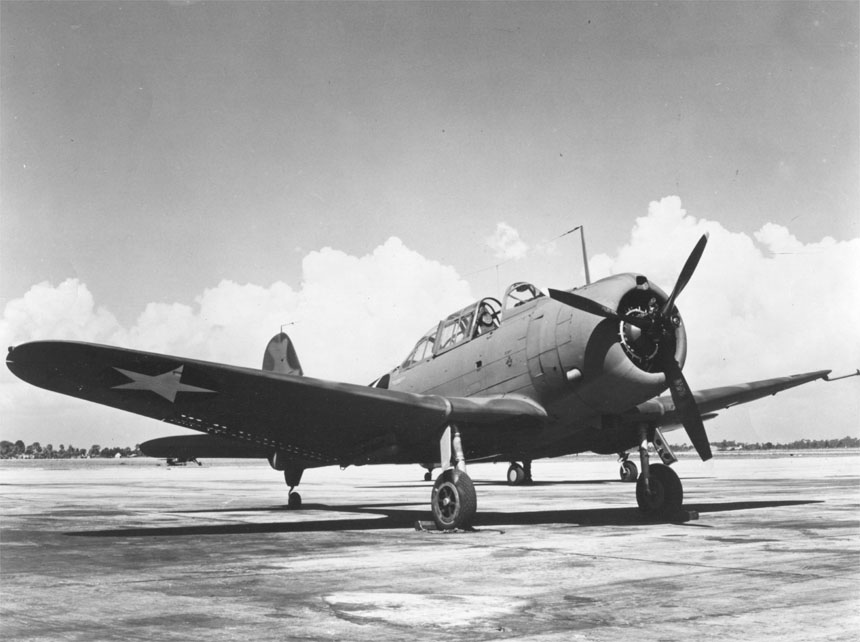
A-24 Banshee as flown by the squadron

The squadron was activated in 1942 as the 301st Bombardment Squadron (Light) at Savannah Air Base, Georgia, and equipped with Douglas A-24 Banshee dive bombers as one of the original squadrons of the 84th Bombardment Group. It received its initial cadre and equipment from the 3d Bombardment Group. It operated briefly with Vultee V-72 (A-31 Vengeance) aircraft, but its operations showed this aircraft was unsuitable for dive bombing. The squadron served as an Operational Training Unit (OTU), equipping with Douglas A-24 Banshees and Bell P-39 Airacobras.

The OTU program involved the use of an oversized parent unit to provide cadres to “satellite groups " The OTU program was patterned after the unit training system of the Royal Air Force. After forming the satellite groups, it assumed responsibility for their training and oversaw their expansion with graduates of Army Air Forces Training Command schools to become effective combat units. Phase I training concentrated on individual training in crewmember specialties. Phase II training emphasized the coordination for the crew to act as a team. The final phase concentrated on operation as a unit. It contributed to the 84th Group's role as the parent for elements of several light bombardment groups. (Note: These units were the 85th, 311th, 312th, 319th, 405th and 407th Bombardment Groups.)

In August 1943, the squadron was redesignated the 496th Fighter-Bomber Squadron as were other Army Air Forces (AAF) single engine bombardment units, and was re-equipped with Republic P-47 Thunderbolts. It continued to serve as an OTU until October 1943. During the fall of 1943, operations dwindled and by the end of September 1943 only five aircraft were assigned to the entire 84th Group.

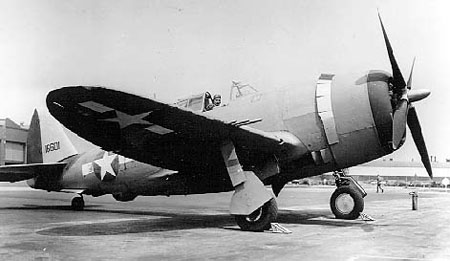
P-47 Thunderbolt

The squadron then became a Replacement Training Unit (RTU) and also participated occasionally in demonstrations and maneuvers. RTUs were also oversized units, but with the mission of training individual pilots or aircrews. However, the AAF found that standard military units, based on relatively inflexible tables of organization were not proving well adapted to the training mission. Accordingly, it adopted a more functional system in which each base was organized into a separate numbered unit. The squadron was, therefore, disbanded in April 1944 and replaced by the 261st AAF Base Unit (Combat Crew Training School, Fighter), which took over the personnel, equipment and mission of the squadron at Abilene Army Air Field.

=== Air reserve ===
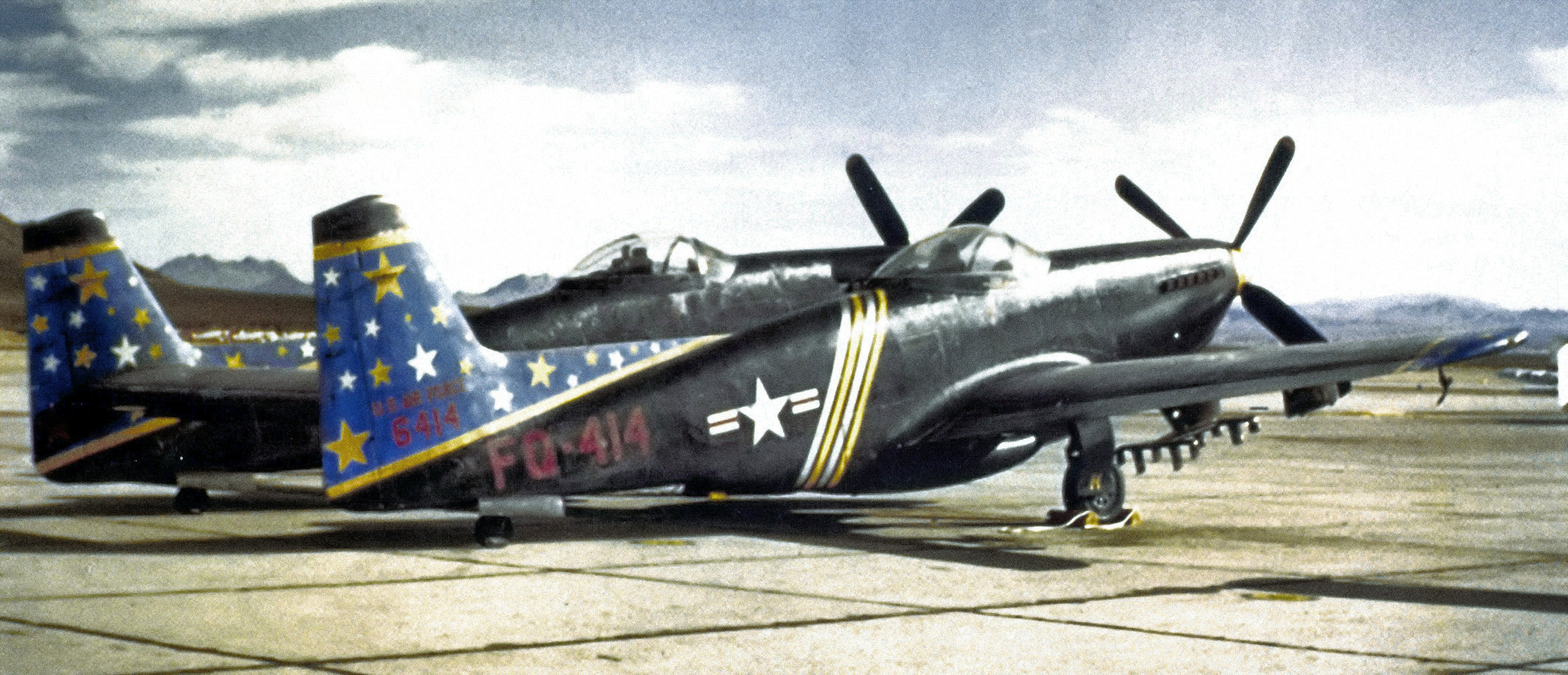
F-82 of the 52d Fighter Group (Note: Aircraft is North American F-82F Twin Mustang serial 46-414 assigned to the 2nd Fighter All-Weather Squadron.)

The May 1949 Air Force Reserve program called for a new type of unit, the corollary unit, which was a reserve unit integrated with an active duty unit. The plan called for corollary units at 107 locations. It was viewed as the best method to train reservists by mixing them with an existing regular unit to perform duties alongside the regular unit. As part of this program, the squadron was reconstituted as the 496th Fighter Squadron, All Weather and activated at Mitchel Air Force Base, New York in the air reserve to train as a fighter corollary unit of the 52d Fighter Group of the regular Air Force, moving with the 52d to McGuire Air Force Base, New Jersey a few months later. The squadron was apparently undermanned and thus performed very little training. In February 1950, it was redesignated 496th Fighter All-Weather Squadron. During its only 2-week summer encampment (12–26 June 1950), the entire 84th Group had only four pilots capable of flying the 52d's North American F-82 Twin Mustangs provided for their training. Like with other corollary units, the parent 52d Fighter-All Weather Wing made little use of the 496th, focusing on the wing's combat mission instead. The 84th Group was ordered to active service on 1 June 1951, inactivated the next day, and its few people became "fillers" for the 52d Wing or for other USAF units.

=== Interceptor operations ===
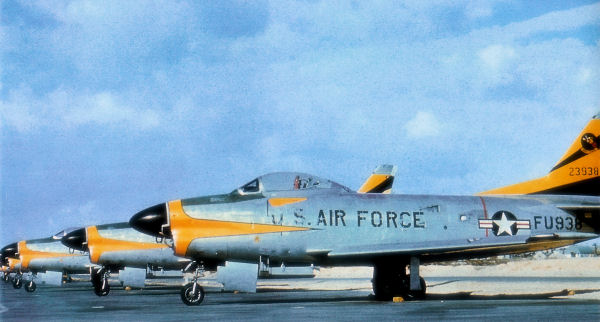
496th F-86D Sabres (Note: Aircraft are North American F-86D-45-NA Sabres. Serial 52-3938 is in front. After the squadron transitioned to the F-102 in 1959, this aircraft was transferred to the Japanese Air Self-Defense Force.)

The squadron was redesignated the 496th Fighter-Interceptor Squadron and activated in March 1953 at Hamilton Air Force Base, California in early 1953. The squadron was initially formed with World War II era North American F-51D Mustangs. By December, however, it was equipped with North American F-86D Sabres, equipped with airborne intercept radar and armed with Folding-Fin Aerial Rockets. The squadron departed Hamilton at the end of May 1954 for Europe.

The squadron was assigned to Twelfth Air Force, but attached to the 86th Fighter-Bomber Wing) on 1 July 1954 and arrived at Landstuhl Air Base, Germany on 4 July. In December, United States Air Forces Europe (USAFE) formed the 7486th Air Defense Group at Landstuhl and the squadron was assigned to it. In July 1955, the 7486 became an air base group, but the squadron remained assigned to it until January 1956, when the 496th became part of the 86th Fighter-Interceptor Group. In November 1956, the squadron moved to Hahn Air Base, Germany.

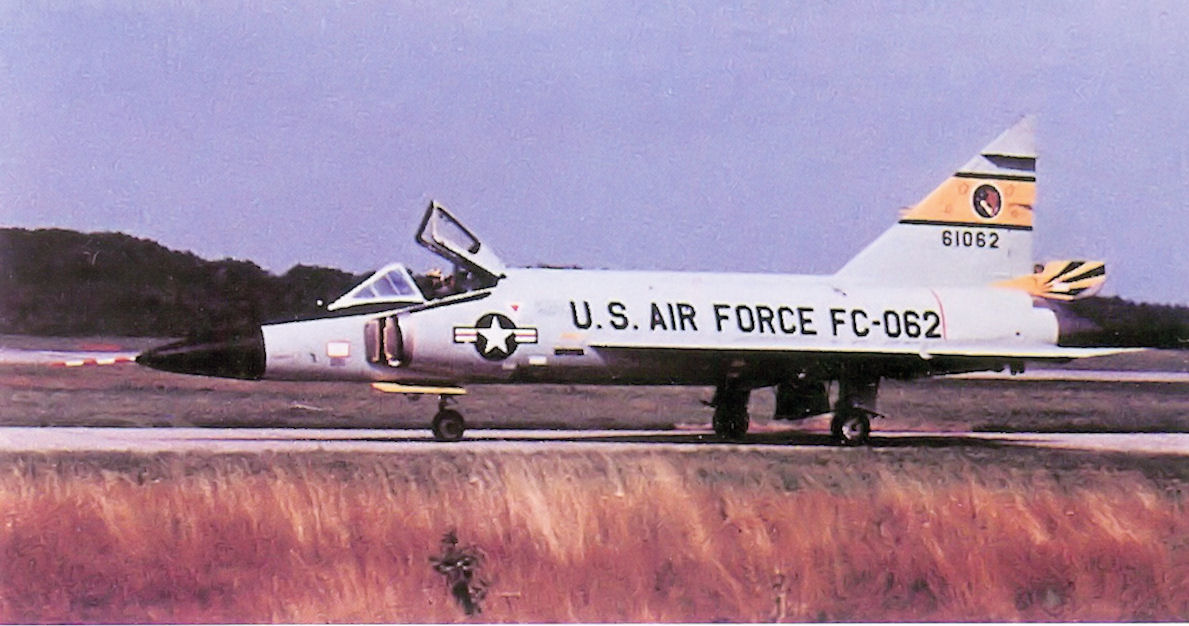
Squadron F-102A Delta Dagger (Note: Aircraft is Convair F-102A-60 Delta Dagger, serial 56-1062. It was among those transferred to the 194th Fighter-Interceptor Squadron in 1970. It was shipped to the Military Aircraft Storage and Disposal Center on 18 June 1974 and converted to a PQM-102B drone in 1980. Dirkx, Marco (6 May 2025). "1956 USAF Serial Numbers". Joe Baugher’s Serial Number List.)

The 86th Fighter-Interceptor Group was inactivated in March 1958, and the squadron was reassigned to the 86th Fighter-Interceptor Wing. In 1959, the squadron began to transition from its Sabres to the Convair F-102A Delta Dagger, which was equipped with data link for interception control and armed with AIM-4 Falcon missiles. It completed the changeover in 1960.

=== Tactical fighter operations ===
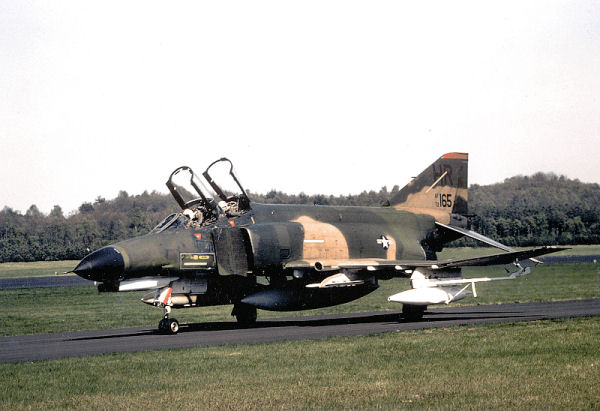
Squadron F-4E Phantom II at Hahn AB (Note: Aircraft is McDonnell F-4E-52-MC Phantom II serial 72-0165. This plane was transferred to the Aerospace Maintenance & Regeneration Center on 25 March 1991 and scrapped on 19 December 2017. Dirkx, Marco (8 July 2024). "1972 USAF Serial Numbers". Joe Baugher’s Serial Number List.)

On 1 November 1968, the squadron became the 496th Tactical Fighter Squadron, and two weeks later was assigned to the 50th Tactical Fighter Wing, which was flying McDonnell F-4D Phantom IIs. The squadron began returning its F-102s to the United States, where they were transferred to the 194th Fighter-Interceptor Squadron, in 1970 and became the first squadron in the 50th Wing to equip with the F-4E model of the Phantom II. Despite its change of name and aircraft, the squadron retained air defense as its primary mission until 1977, when the 50th Wing was entirely equipped with the F-4E and became dedicated to the tactical fighter mission.

In December 1981, the 50th Wing became the first USAFE unit to upgrade to the General Dynamics F-16 Fighting Falcon, completing the transition in June 1982. Between March 1985 and December 1987, the wing upgraded its Block 15 F-16As and F-16Bs to Block 25 F-16Cs and F-16Ds. Although the squadron did not participate in the Gulf War as a unit, it deployed personnel and equipment to support it.

The squadron was inactivated in May 1991 as the 50th Tactical Fighter Wing began to draw down at Hahn in preparation for its inactivation with the termination of Hahn as an operational base in September.

== Lineage ==
- Constituted as the 301st Bombardment Squadron (Light) on 13 January 1942

Activated on 10 February 1942
Redesignated 301st Bombardment Squadron (Dive) on 27 July 1942
Redesignated 496th Fighter-Bomber Squadron on 10 August 1943
Disbanded on 1 April 1944

- Reconstituted, and redesignated 496th Fighter Squadron, All Weather on 16 May 1949

Activated in the reserve on 1 June 1949
Redesignated 496th Fighter-All Weather Squadron on 1 March 1950
Ordered to active service on 1 June 1951
Inactivated on 2 June 1951

- Redesignated 496th Fighter-Interceptor Squadron on 11 February 1953

Activated on 20 March 1953
Redesignated 496th Tactical Fighter Squadron, 1 November 1968
Inactivated 15 May 1991

=== Assignments ===
- 84th Bombardment Group (later 84th Fighter-Bomber Group), 10 February 1942 – 1 April 1944
- 84th Fighter Group, 1 June 1949 – 2 June 1951
- 566th Air Defense Group, 20 March 1953
- Twelfth Air Force (attached to 86th Fighter-Bomber Wing), 1 July 1954
- 7486th Air Defense Group (later 7486th Air Base Group), 2 December 1954
- 86th Fighter-Interceptor Group, 3 January 1956
- 86th Fighter-Interceptor Wing (later 86th Air Division), 8 March 1958 (Note: Maurer treats the November 1960 action as a reassignment from the 86th Wing to the 86th Division. However the 86th Air Division was the 86th Fighter-Interceptor Wing redesignated. Compare Maurer, Combat Squadrons, p. 598 with Ravenstein, p. 120.) (attached to 50th Tactical Fighter Wing after 1 November 1968)
- 50th Tactical Fighter Wing, 25 November 1968 – 15 May 1991

=== Stations ===
- Savannah Air Base (later Hunter Field), Georgia, 10 February 1942
- Drew Field, Florida, 8 February 1943
- Harding Field, Louisiana, 4 October 1943
- Hammond Army Air Field, Louisiana, 9 November 1943
- Abilene Army Air Field, Texas, 11 February – 1 April 1944
- Mitchel Air Force Base, New York, 1 June 1949
- McGuire Air Force Base, New Jersey, 10 October 1949 – 2 June 1951
- Hamilton Air Force Base, California, 20 March 1953
- Landstuhl Air Base, Germany, 4 July 1954
- Hahn Air Base, Germany, 8 November 1956 – 15 May 1991

=== Aircraft ===
- Vultee V-72 Vengeance, 1942
- Douglas A-24 Banshee, 1942–1943
- Bell P-39 Airacobra, 1943
- Republic P-47 Thunderbolt, 1943–1944
- North American F-82 Twin Mustang
- North American F-51 Mustang, 1953
- North American F-86D Sabre, 1953–1960
- Convair F-102 Delta Dagger, 1959–1970
- McDonnell F-4 Phantom II, 1970–1982
- General Dynamics F-16 Fighting Falcon, 1982–1991

=== Awards and campaigns ===
Award streamer	Award	Dates	Notes
	Air Force Outstanding Unit Award	31 October 1955-31 October 1958	496th Fighter-Interceptor Squadron
	Air Force Outstanding Unit Award	1 July 1964-30 June 1965	496th Fighter-Interceptor Squadron
	Air Force Outstanding Unit Award	1 November 1970-15 September 1971	496th Tactical Fighter Squadron
	Air Force Outstanding Unit Award	1 January 1972-30 June 1973	496th Tactical Fighter Squadron
	Air Force Outstanding Unit Award	1 July 1973-30 June 1974	496th Tactical Fighter Squadron
	Air Force Outstanding Unit Award	1 July 1982-30 June 1984	496th Tactical Fighter Squadron
	Air Force Outstanding Unit Award	1 July 1985-30 June 1987	496th Tactical Fighter Squadron
	Air Force Outstanding Unit Award	1 July 1990-5 August 1991	496th Tactical Fighter Squadron

Campaign Streamer	Campaign	Dates	Notes
	American Theater without inscription	10 February 1942–1 April 1944	302nd Bombardment Squadron (later 496th Fighter-Bomber Squadron)

== See also ==
- Aerospace Defense Command Fighter Squadrons
- List of F-86 Sabre units
- List of F-4 Phantom II operators
- General Dynamics F-16 Fighting Falcon operators
