= Hahn Air Base =

Former U.S. Air Force base in Germany

Hahn Air Base
- Located near Kirchberg, Germany
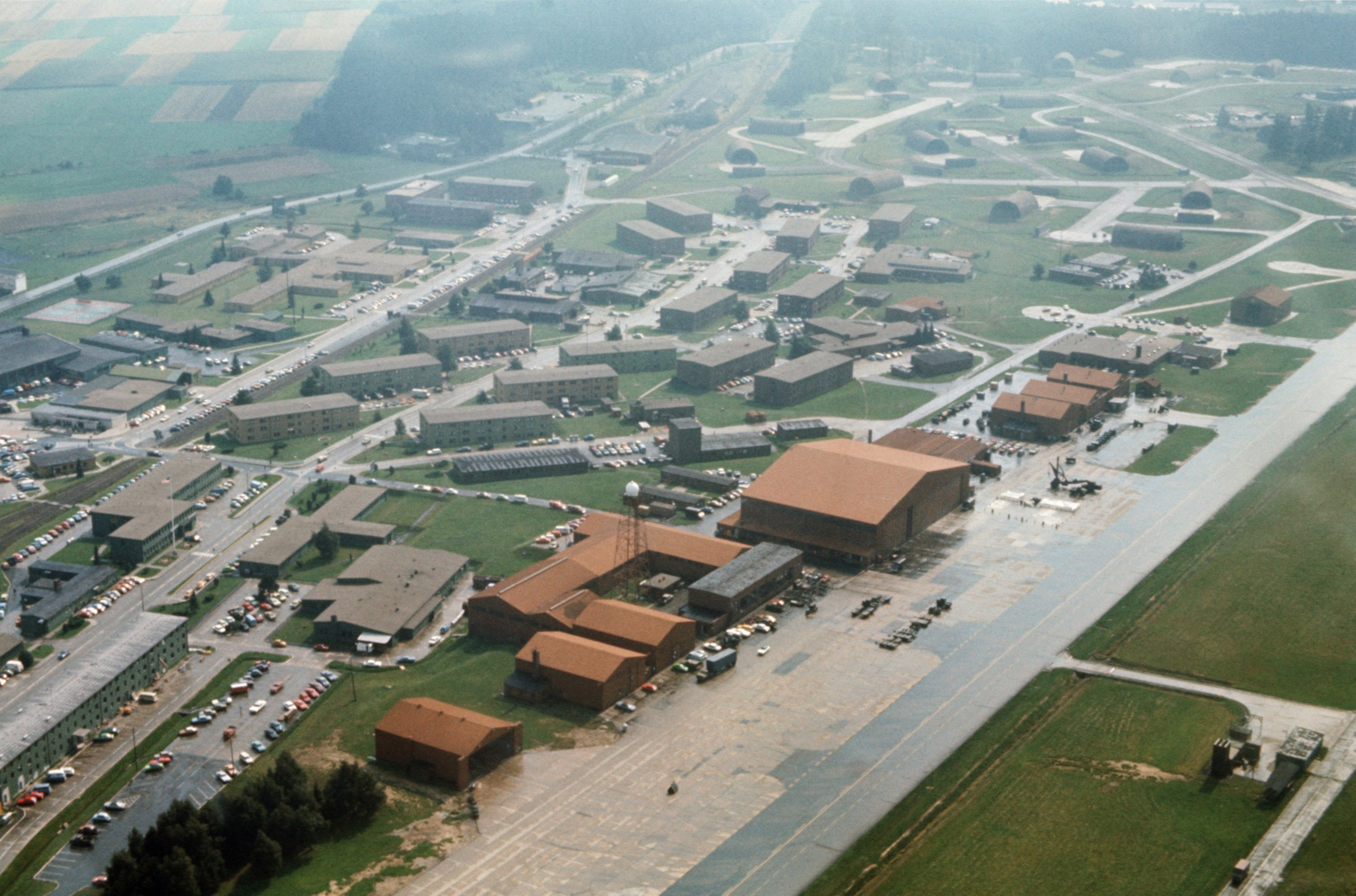

Site information
- Type: Air Force Base
- Controlled by: United States Air Force

Location
- Coordinates: 49°56′54″N 7°15′51″E

Site history
- Built: 1951
- In use: 1952-1994

Garrison information
- Garrison: 50th Fighter Wing

Hahn Air Base was a United States Air Force (USAF) installation near Lautzenhausen in Germany for over forty years. The major unit was the 50th Tactical Fighter Wing of the USAF during most of the years it was active. In the mid-1970s, Hahn Air Base, situated 1650 feet above sea level in the Hunsrück mountains of western Germany, was home for approximately 9000 American personnel including USAF, U.S. Army, Department of Defense civilians, and military dependent family members.

== History ==
Groundwork for the construction of Hahn Air Base was begun in 1951, when approximately 1280 acres of land were acquired from the French occupation forces in West Germany. Construction of the runway and airdrome facilities was performed by the French.

The 7356th Air Base Squadron was designated to complete the work on the base and prepare for the arrival of the 50th Fighter-Bomber Wing from Clovis Air Force Base, New Mexico· When the airplanes and crews arrived at Hahn in August 1953, it marked the first mass flight of an entire tactical wing from the United States to continental Europe - a historic step in the history of the USAF. In the mid-1950s, major Chuck Yeager was assigned as squadron commander of one F-86F Sabre aircraft squadron at Hahn.

In 1956, the wing was transferred to Toul-Rosières Air Base, France, and the 7425th Air Base Group was left at Hahn to care for the facility. During the wing's absence, the base was used to support F-102 Delta Dagger's of the 496th Fighter-Interceptor Squadron, elements of another fighter bomber wing, and a tactical missile wing.

During the three years in France, the 50th Wing converted to the F-100D Super Sabre and, in 1959, returned to Hahn Air Base. The 7425th Group was redesignated the 50th Air Base Group.

In 1967, the wing's 10th and 81st Fighter Squadrons began converting to the F-4C and D aircraft. The conversion was completed in 1968. That same year saw the 496th Fighter Interceptor Squadron assigned to the 50th Wing, after spending twelve years at Hahn. In 1970, the 496th was converted to F-4E aircraft, and redesignated as a Tactical Fighter Squadron, but maintained their air defense mission.

In 1971, the 81st was reassigned to another base in West Germany, leaving Hahn with only two fighter squadrons, the 10th and 496th until November 1976 when the 313th Tactical Fighter Squadron was added with F-4E Phantom II aircraft.

The 50th Tactical Fighter Wing was inactivated in 1991 after 35 years at Hahn. In September 1993, Hahn Air Base was turned over to the German Government. The USAF kept a radio communications site until it was deactivated in 2012.

== See also ==
- Frankfurt International Airport
- 10th Tactical Fighter Squadron
- 313th Tactical Fighter Squadron
- 496th Tactical Fighter Squadron
- 50th Tactical Fighter Wing
