= Ernest Gardner (art historian) =

English writer, art historian and photographer

Ernest Arthur Gardner MA FSA (16 May 1878 – 29 January 1972) known as Arthur Gardner, was an English writer, art historian and photographer with a particular focus on medieval sculpture and architecture.

== Early life ==
Ernest Arthur Gardner was born in Harrow on the Hill to the antiquary Samuel Gardner. He graduated in 1901 from King's College, Cambridge, and entered the family firm of stockbrokers afterwards. He remained working there for 40 years.

== Career ==
Gardner significantly contributed to the study of medieval architecture and sculpture. Gardner's publications, particularly his broad surveys of medieval sculpture, are most famous for their ability to effectively and succinctly synthesise existing material, research and findings of other academics on the topic. Gardner was also able to make medieval art more accessible to the wider public through offering sumptuous illustrations in his works, many of which became standardised academic textbooks.

=== Photography ===
Gardner learned photography from his father and travelled throughout Europe and the British Isles, photographing medieval monuments and buildings for his impressive photographic collection. Many of the sites Gardner photographed have since been destroyed or rebuilt, making his photographic collection particularly valuable for scholars and the public today. This collection has been contributed to the Conway Library of the Courtauld Institute of Art, and is currently being digitised by the Courtauld Institute of Art, as part of the Courtauld Connects project.

== Publications ==
Some of his publications include:

- An Account of Medieval Figure-Sculpture in England. With 855 photographs (Cambridge University Press, 1912) co-authored with E. S. Prior
- French Sculpture of the Thirteenth Century: seventy-eight examples of masterpieces of medieval art illustrating works at Reims (The Medici Society, 1915)
- The Peaks, Lochs and Coasts of the Western Highlands (H. F. and G. Witherby, 1924) revised and enlarged edition 1928
- The Art and Sport of Alpine Photography (H. F. and G. Witherby, 1927)
- Medieval Sculpture in France (Cambridge University Press, 1931)
- Sun, Cloud and Snow in the Western Highlands (Grant and Murray, 1933)
- A Handbook of English Medieval Sculpture (Cambridge University Press, 1935) revised and enlarged in 1951 as English Medieval Sculpture
- An Introduction to French Church Architecture (Cambridge University Press, 1938)
- Alabaster Tombs of the Pre-Reformation Period in England (Cambridge University Press, 1940)
- Britain's Mountain Heritage, and its Preservation as National Parks (B. T. Batsford, 1942) revised second edition
- Western Highlands (B. T. Batsford, 1947)
- Lincoln Angels (Friends of Lincoln Cathedral, c.1955)
- Minor English Wood Sculpture 1400-1550 (Alec Tiranti, 1958)
