= Arthur Gardiner (Royal Navy officer) =

British Royal Navy captain

Captain Arthur Gardiner
- Born: 1716?
- Died: 1758
- Occupation: Royal Navy captain

Arthur Gardiner (1716? – 1758) was a British Royal Navy captain.

== Biography ==
Gardiner is described in his passing certificate, dated 3 November 1737, as more than twenty-one years of age, and as having been at sea upwards of six years, chiefly in the Falmouth, with Captain John Byng. On 4 July 1738 he was promoted to be lieutenant, and after serving in the Sutherland, and in the Captain with Captain Thomas Griffin, he was promoted on 6 June 1744 to the command of the Lightning bomb, from which on 27 May 1745 he was posted to the Neptune as flag-captain to Vice-admiral Rowley. On 1 Oct. he was moved into the Feversham, which he commanded for three years in the Mediterranean, From 1749 to 1754 he commanded the Amazon on the coast of Ireland, and, on paying her off, applied on 15 May 1754 for leave to go to France for eight or ten months. In May 1755 he was appointed to the Colchester, but left her in the following September to join the Ramillies as flag-captain to his old commander, now Admiral Byng. In this capacity he accompanied Byng to the Mediterranean; and when, after the action off Minorca, Byng was recalled, Gardiner too was superseded from his command. At Byng's trial several points in Gardiner's evidence bore heavily on the accused, especially as he was a personal friend and an unwilling witness. In February 1757 he was appointed to the Monmouth of 64 guns, and again sent to the Mediterranean. In February 1758 he was with the squadron under Admiral Osborn, shutting up M. de la Clue in Cartagena, when on the 28th the Marquis Duquesne, with three ships, attempted to raise the blockade. The ships were immediately chased, and took different courses. The Foudroyant, carrying Duquesne's broad pennant, was the ship in which M. de Oalsonnière had hoisted his flag in the battle of Minorca, and, notwithstanding her enormous size, Gardiner had been heard to say that if he fell in with her, in the Monmouth, he would take her or perish in the attempt. It is, perhaps, more probable that the story was invented afterwards; for it was by the mere accident of position that the Foudroyant was chased by the Monmouth, the Swiftsure and Hampton Court, each of 70 guns, following. As night closed in, however, the Monmouth ran the chase out of sight of the other two ships, and, having partially disabled her rigging, brought her to close action about seven o'clock. In the very beginning of the fight Gardiner was wounded in the arm by a musket bullet, though not so seriously as to compel him to leave the deck. About nine o'clock, however, he fell, shot through the head, and died a few hours afterwards. The fight was gallantly continued by the first lieutenant, Robert Carkett, and on the Swiftsure coming up about one o'clock, the Foudroyant hauled down her colours. The great disproportion between the combatants, the Foudroyant being an unusually large and heavily armed ship of 8O guns, and the fact that the Monmouth alone had beaten her gigantic adversary almost to a standstill before the Swift sure came up, as well as the circumstances of Gardiner's death, have all combined to render the action one of the most celebrated in the Royal Navy's annals; and that this distinction should have been achieved by a pupil of Byng and Griffin is perhaps not its least remarkable feature.
