= 455th Flying Training Squadron =

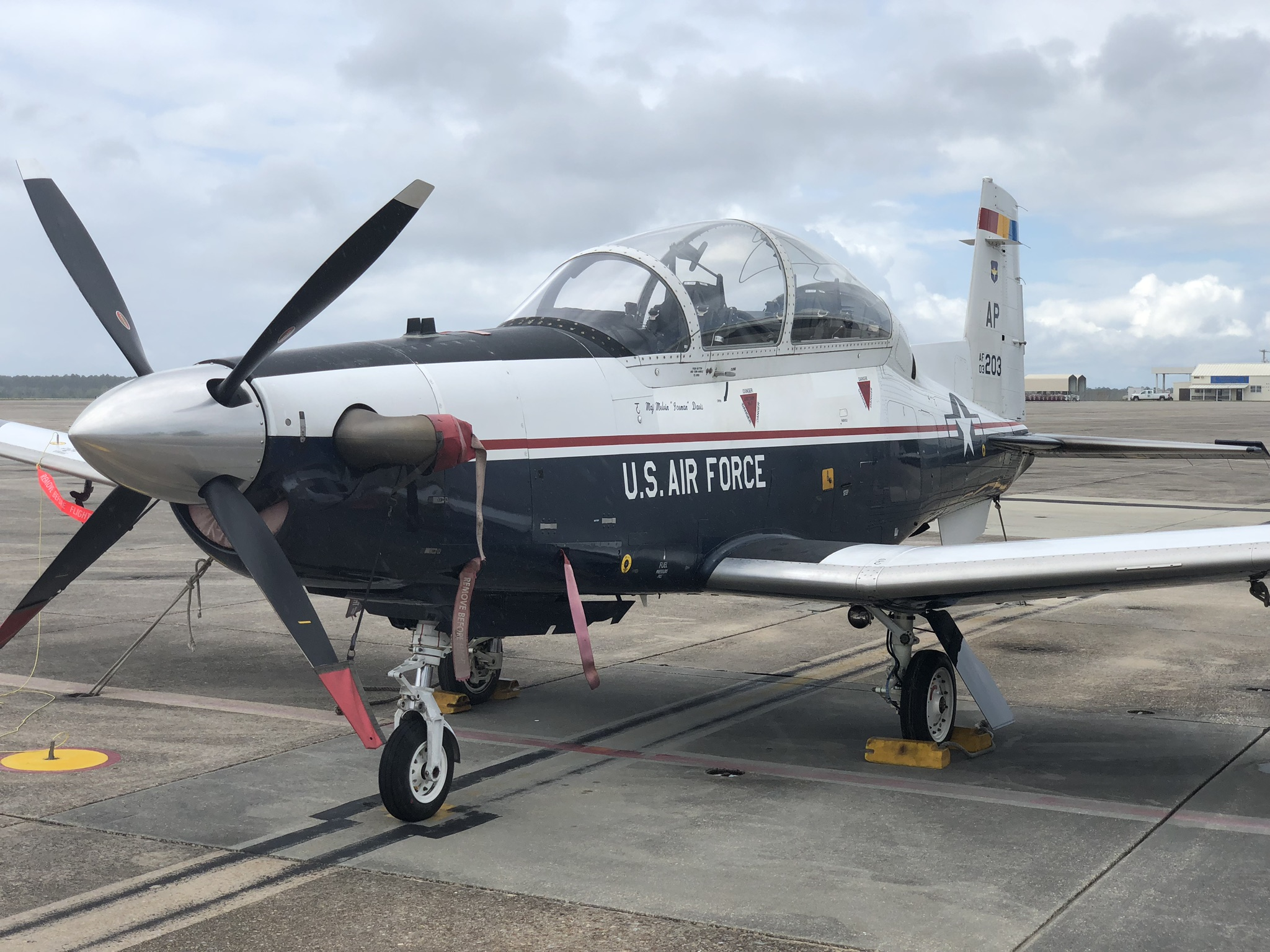
- T-6A Texan II as flown by the squadron
- Active: 1942–1945; 1949–1951; 1955–1957; 1973–1993; 2009–present
- Country: United States
- Branch: United States Air Force
- Role: Flying Training
- Part of: Air Education and Training Command
- Nickname: Nighthawks
- Mottos: Sine Alis Volamus (Latin for 'Without Wings We Fly') (World War II); Supersonic Security (1957); Sine Alis Adsurgimus (Latin for 'Without Wings We Rise') (2023-)
- Engagements: European Theater of Operations
- Decorations: Distinguished Unit Citation; Air Force Outstanding Unit Award

Insignia
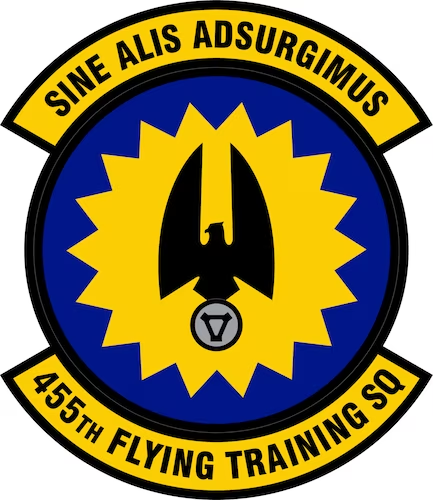
- 455th Flying Training Squadron emblem (Note: Approved 10 May 2023.)

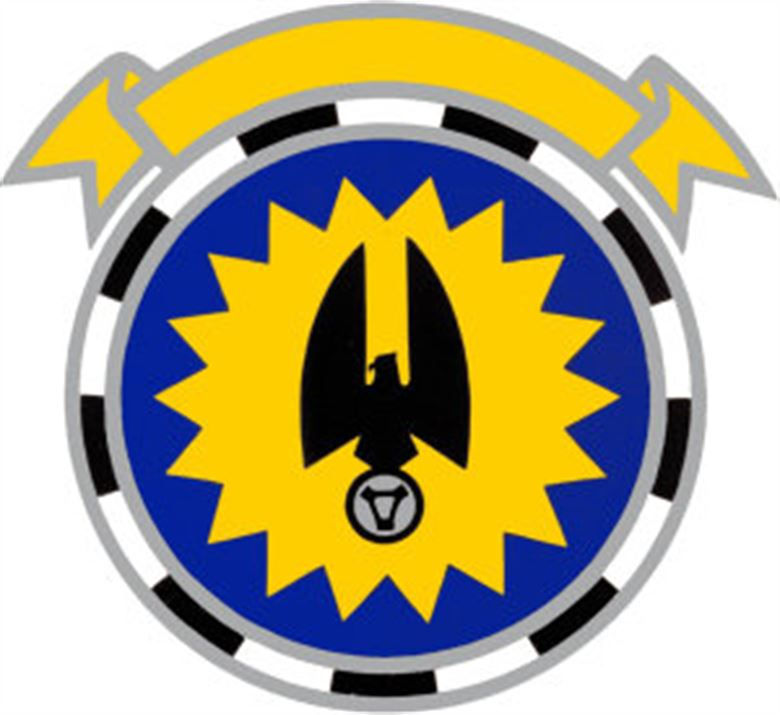
- 455th Flying Training Squadron emblem (Note: Approved 30 May 1973.)

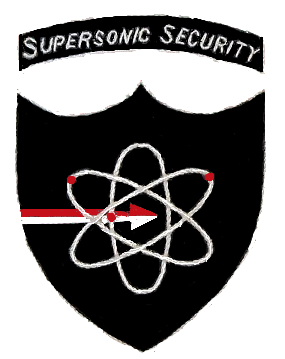
- 455th Fighter-Bomber Squadron emblem (Note: Approved 7 June 1957. Description: On a shield black, an atomic symbol of three white elliptical electronic rings and two red nuclei; piercing through the symbol a supersonic dart-shaped silhouetted white aircraft with red and white power, trailing off to the dexter side of the shield.)

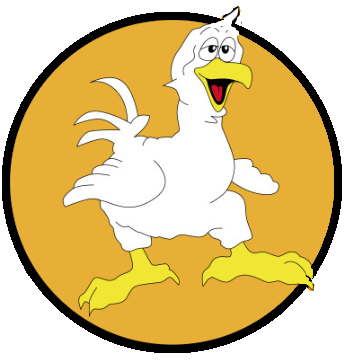
- 455th Bombardment Squadron emblem (World War II
- World War II fuselage code: YU
- Tail code: PA

The 455th Flying Training Squadron is a United States Air Force unit of Air Education and Training Command. It was most recently activated at NAS Pensacola as part of the 479th Flying Training Group, where it trains Combat Systems Officers with the Raytheon T-6 Texan II.

The squadron was first activated during World War II as the 455th Bombardment Squadron. After training in the United States, it deployed to the European Theater of Operations, earning a Distinguished Unit Citation before returning to the United States for inactivation. It was activated again in the reserves in 1949. It was mobilized in 1951 for the Korean War and inactivated, as its personnel were used as fillers for other units.

The squadron was redesignated the 455th Fighter-Bomber Squadron and activated in Tactical Air Command in 1955, but inactivated two years later. In 1973 it was activated at Mather Air Force Base, where it trained navigators until it was inactivated on 1 October 1993. It was reactivated in October 2009.

== Mission ==
The 455th Flying Training Squadron trains combat systems officers (CSO)s, using the Raytheon T-6 Texan II. It is the only primary training squadron for CSOs in the Air Force. After training with the 455th, CSOs receive advanced training with the 451st Flying Training Squadron.

== History ==
=== World War II ===
==== Organization and training in the United States ====
The squadron was first activated as the 455th Bombardment Squadron at Columbia Army Air Base, South Carolina on 4 August 1942 as one of the four original squadrons of the 323d Bombardment Group. The squadron moved to MacDill Field, Florida, where it received its initial cadre in September andcompleted Phase I training with Martin B-26 Marauders. The squadron trained for combat at Myrtle Beach Bombing Range, South Carolina until late April 1943, when the ground echelon departed Myrtle Beach for England, sailing on the RMS Queen Elizabeth on 5 May. The air echelon of the squadron had moved to Baer Field, Indiana in February. At Baer, it received new B-26Cs, then proceeded to the United Kingdom via the south Atlantic ferry route by June.

==== Combat in Europe ====
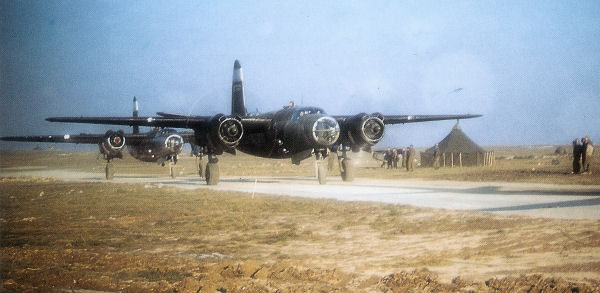
323d Bomb Group B-26s

The squadron arrived at its first combat station, RAF Horham, in May 1943. In June 1943, the squadron, along with all other B-26 units in England, moved to Essex, an area where it was planned to build up a tactical air force for the forthcoming invasion of Europe, with the 455th arriving at RAF Earls Colne on 14 June. The squadron began operations with Eighth Air Force in July 1943 as part of the first raid on the European continent by B-26s. When Ninth Air Force moved to the United Kingdom in the fall of 1943, the squadron became part of it. It attacked airports, industrial factories, marshalling yards and military targets in France and the Low Countries. During Big Week the squadron attacked the Leeuwarden and Venlo Airfields. The squadron also attacked V-weapons launch sites in France.

In preparation for Operation Overlord, the Invasion of Normandy, the 455th attacked coastal defenses and other targets in northwestern France. On D-Day it attacked lines of communication and fortifications on the coast. It was part of the aerial barrage during the opening stage of Operation Cobra, the breakout at Saint Lo.

In late August 1944, the squadron left England for Lessay Airfield, an advanced landing ground in France. From the continent, it began flying night missions, with its first night mission against batteries near Saint-Malo. It also carried out night missions against ammunition dumps and fuel storage areas. In September, it attacked fortifications near Brest, France, and as allied forces advanced across France, toward the Siegfried Line shifted its operations primarily to targets in eastern France. The squadron was awarded a Distinguished Unit Citation for striking transportation hubs used by the Wehrmacht to bring reinforcements to the Ardennes during the Battle of the Bulge.

The 455th flew interdiction missions in the Ruhr as the Allies drove across Germany and attacked enemy communications. It flew its last combat in April 1945, then moved to Kempten, Germany, where it participated in the program to disarm Germany until September, when most of its personnel were withdrawn. It returned to the United States in November and was inactivated at Camp Myles Standish, Massachusetts, the port of embarkation, a day later.

=== Air Force reserve ===
The squadron was reactivated under Continental Air Command (ConAC) as a reserve unit at Tinker Air Force Base in June 1949, when ConAC reorganized its reserve units under the wing base organization system. At Tinker, it trained under the supervision of ConAC's 2592d Air Force Reserve Training Center. The squadron flew a mix of trainers and Douglas A-26 Invaders. The unit was manned at only 25% of its normal strength. All reserve combat units were mobilized for the Korean war. The squadron was mobilized on 10 March 1951. Its personnel and aircraft were used as fillers for other organizations ond the squadron was inactivated a week later.

=== Fighter operations ===
The squadron was redesignated the 455th Fighter-Bomber Squadron and activated at Bunker Hill Air Force Base, Indiana on 8 August 1955, when the Air Force reopened the base, a former World War II Navy training station. The squadron was initially equipped with North American F-86 Sabres, but soon began upgrading to the supersonic North American F-100 Super Sabre. However, the squadron, along with all other elements of the 323d Fighter-Bomber Wing, was inactivated on 1 September 1957, when Tactical Air Command transferred Bunker Hill to Strategic Air Command.

=== Flying training ===
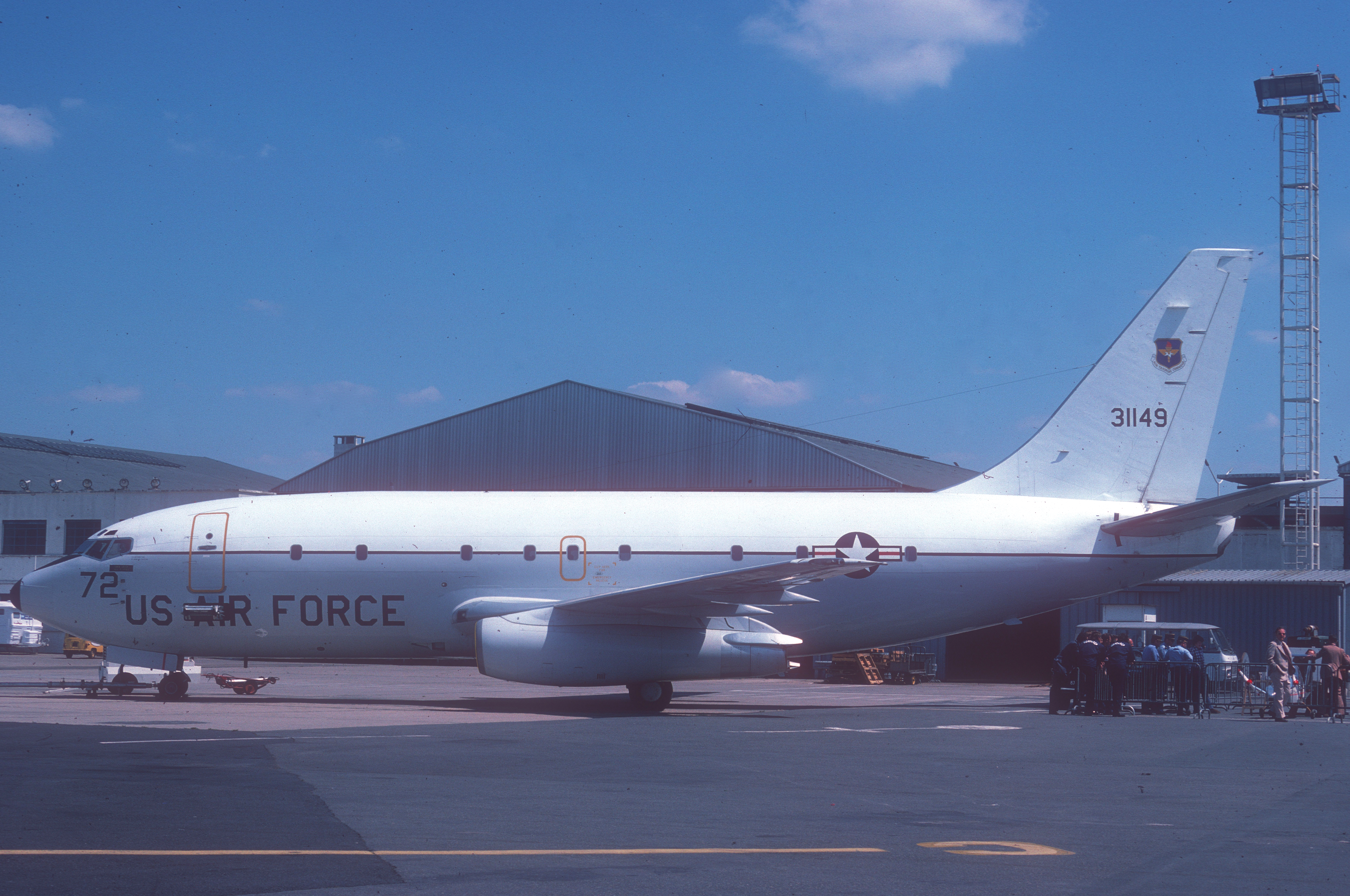
Squadron T-43A (Note: Aircraft is Boeing T-43A, serial 73-1149, taken in June 1977. This was the first T-43 delivered to the Air Force. It was later converted to CT-43A standard as a VIP transport. It crashed in Bosnia on 3 April 1996. All 35 aboard, including Secretary of Commerce Ron Brown, were killed. Baugher, Joe (4 August 2023). "1973 USAF Serial Numbers". Joe Baugher.)

On 1 April 1973, the squadron was activated as the 455th Flying Training Squadron. In 1978, the first females began navigator training. It continued to conduct undergraduate navigator training for USAF, United States Navy, United States Marine Corps, and United States allies until 1993. In 1989, the base closure commission recommended that Mather be closed. The Air Force moved its navigator training to Randolph Air Force Base, Texas and the squadron was inactivated on 31 May 1993 as Mather drew down in preparing for closing on 1 October 1993.

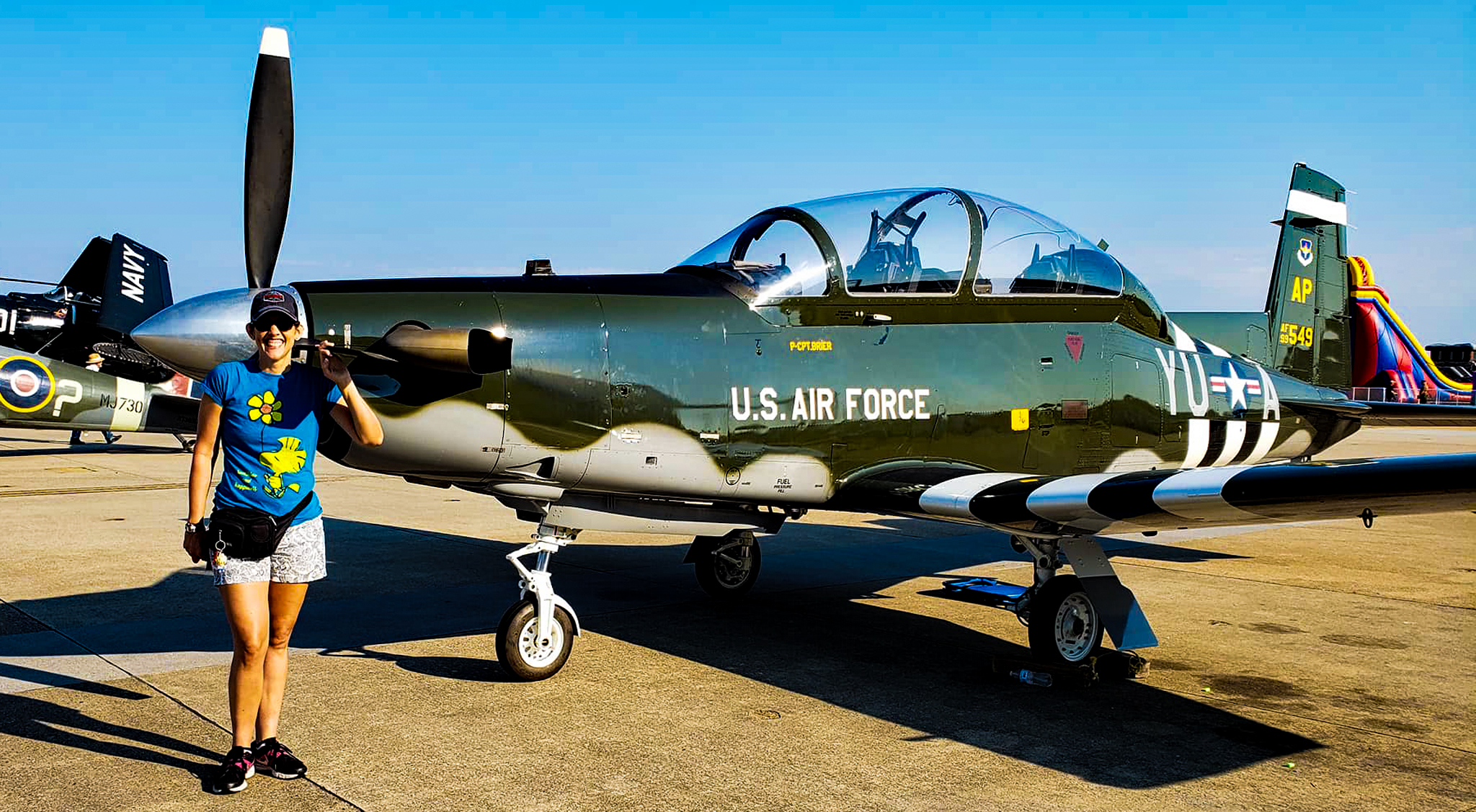
Squadron T-6A Texan II Heritage Aircraft in B-26 D-Day markings

In 2009, the Air Force inactivated the 562nd and 562nd Flying Training Squadrons, which had been training Air Force navigators and electronic warfare officers and Navy flight officers. In their place the 455th and 451st Flying Training Squadrons were activated at Naval Air Station Pensacola, Florida. The 455th is part of the 12th Flying Training Wing’s 479th Flying Training Group at Pensacola.

== Lineage ==
- Constituted as the 455th Bombardment Squadron, Medium on 19 June 1942

Activated on 4 August 1942
Inactivated on 12 December 1945

- Redesignated 455th Bombardment Squadron, Light on 10 May 1949

Activated in the reserve on 27 June 1949
Ordered to active service 10 March 1951
Inactivated on 17 March 1951

- Redesignated 455th Fighter-Bomber Squadron on 9 May 1955

Activated on 8 August 1955
Inactivated on 1 September 1957

- Redesignated 455th Flying Training Squadron on 28 July 1972

Activated on 31 May 1973
Inactivated on 31 May 1993
Activated on 2 October 2009

=== Assignments ===
- 323d Bombardment Group, 4 August 1942 – 26 November 1945
- 323d Bombardment Group, 27 June 1949 – 17 March 1951
- 11th Air Division, 8 August 1955
- 323d Fighter-Bomber Group, 22 November 1955 – 1 September 1957
- 323d Flying Training Wing, 1 April 1973
- 323d Operations Group, 15 Decemb1r 1991 – 31 May 1993
- 479th Flying Training Group, 2 October 2009 – present

=== Stations ===
- Columbia Army Air Base, South Carolina, 4 August 1942
- MacDill Field, Florida, 21 August 1942
- Myrtle Beach Bombing Range, South Carolina, 2 November 1942 – 25 April 1943
- RAF Horham (AAF-119), England, 12 May 1943
- RAF Earls Colne (AAF-358), England, 14 June 1943
- RAF Beaulieu (AAF-408), England, 21 July 1944
- Lessay Airfield (A-20), France, 26 August 1944
- Chartres Airfield (A-40), France, 21 September 1944
- Laon/Athies Airfield (A-69), France, 13 October 1944
- Denain/Prouvy Airfield (A-83), France, 9 February 1945
- AAF Station Gablingen (R-77), Germany, 8 May 1945
- AAF Station Leipheim (R-59), Germany, 23 May 1945
- Clastres Airfield (A-71), France, October–December 1945
- Camp Myles Standish, Massachusetts, 11–12 December 1945
- Tinker Air Force Base, Oklahoma, 27 June 1949 – 17 March 1951
- Bunker Hill Air Force Base, Indiana, 8 August 1955 – 1 September 1957
- Mather Air Force Base, California, 1 April 1973 – 31 May 1993
- NAS Pensacola, Florida, 2 October 2009 – present

=== Aircraft ===
- Martin B-26 Marauder, 1942–1945
- Douglas B-26 Invader, 1949–1951
- North American T-6 Texan, by 1949–1951
- Beechcraft T-7 Navigator, 1950–1951
- Beechcraft T-11 Kansan, by 1949–1951
- North American F-86 Sabre, 1955–1956
- North American F-100 Super Sabre, 1957-1957
- Convair T-29 Flying Classroom 1973–1975
- Cessna T-37 Tweet 1973–1993
- Boeing T-43 Bobcat 1973–2010
- Raytheon T-6 Texan II 2010–present

=== Awards and campaigns ===
Award streamer	Award	Dates	Notes
	Distinguished Unit Citation	24–27 December 1944	Belgium and Germany, 455th Bombardment Squadron
	Air Force Outstanding Unit Award	1 April – 31 December 1973	455th Flying Training Squadron
	Air Force Outstanding Unit Award	1 January 1976 – 28 February 1977	455th Flying Training Squadron
	Air Force Outstanding Unit Award	1 January 1978 – 30 April 1979	455th Flying Training Squadron
	Air Force Outstanding Unit Award	1 January 1980 – 30 April 1981	455th Flying Training Squadron
	Air Force Outstanding Unit Award	1 July 2011 – 30 June 2013	455th Flying Training Squadron
	Air Force Outstanding Unit Award	1 July 2013 – 30 June 2015	455th Flying Training Squadron
	Air Force Outstanding Unit Award	1 July 2015 – 30 June 2017	455th Flying Training Squadron
	Air Force Outstanding Unit Award	1 July 2017 – 30 June 2019	455th Flying Training Squadron
	Air Force Outstanding Unit Award	1 July 2019 – 30 June 2021	455th Flying Training Squadron
	Air Force Outstanding Unit Award	17 April 2022 – 31 October 2022	455th Flying Training Squadron

Campaign Streamer	Campaign	Dates	Notes
	Air Offensive, Europe	12 May 1943–5 June 1944	455th Bombardment Squadron
	Air Combat, EAME Theater	14 May 1943–11 May 1945	455th Bombardment Squadron
	Normandy	6 June 1944–24 July 1944	455th Bombardment Squadron
	Northern France	25 July 1944–14 September 1944	455th Bombardment Squadron
	Rhineland	15 September 1944–21 March 1945	455th Bombardment Squadron
	Ardennes-Alsace	16 December 1944–25 January 1945	455th Bombardment Squadron
	Central Europe	22 March 1944–21 May 1945	455th Bombardment Squadron
