= 456th Bombardment Squadron =

456th Bombardment Squadron (later 556th Tactical Air Support Squadron)
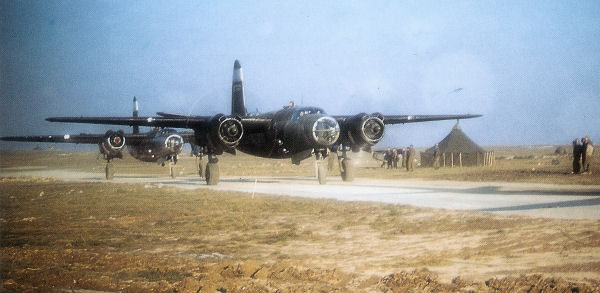
- Martin B-26 Marauders of the 323d Bombardment Group at RAF Earls Colne
- Active: 1942–1945; 1947–1951
- Country: United States
- Branch: United States Air Force
- Role: Bombardment
- Engagements: European Theater of Operations
- Decorations: Distinguished Unit Citation

Insignia
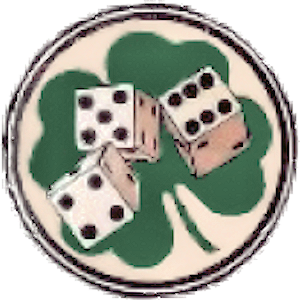
- 456th Bombardment Squadron emblem

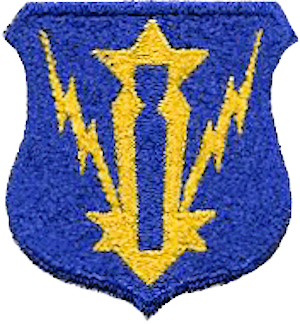
- 656th Bombardment Squadron emblem

The 456th Bombardment Squadron is one of the two predecessors of the 556th Tactical Air Support Squadron, an inactive United States Air Force unit. Formed in 1985 by the consolidation of the 456th with another inactive bombardment squadron. It has never been active under its most recent designation.

The 456th was activated in 1942. After training in the United States with Martin B-26 Marauders, it deployed to the European Theater of Operations, where it served in combat until V-E Day, earning a Distinguished Unit Citation while providing air support during the Battle of the Bulge. Following the war, the squadron returned to the United States and was inactivated. The 456th was activated in the reserve in 1947. In 1951, it was mobilized for the Korean War. Its personnel were used as fillers for other units and it was inactivated again.

The other predecessor of the 556th is the 656th Bombardment Squadron, a Strategic Air Command unit that flew Boeing B-47 Stratojets at Chennault Air Force Base, Louisiana from 1953 to 1963. The two squadrons were consolidated as the 556th in 1985.

== History ==
=== World War II ===
==== Organization and training in the United States ====
The 456th Bombardment Squadron was activated at Columbia Army Air Base, South Carolina on 4 August 1942 as one of the four original squadrons of the 323d Bombardment Group. After Phase I training at MacDill Field, Florida with Martin B-26 Marauders, the squadron trained for combat at Myrtle Beach Bombing Range, South Carolina until late April 1943, when the ground echelon departed Myrtle Beach for England, sailing on the RMS Queen Elizabeth on 5 May. The air echelon of the squadron had moved to Baer Field, Indiana in February. At Baer, it received new B-26Cs, then proceeded to the United Kingdom via the north Atlantic ferry route by June.

==== Combat in Europe ====
The squadron arrived at its first combat station, RAF Horham, in May 1943. In June 1943, the squadron, along with all other B-26 units in England, moved to Essex, an area where it was planned to build up a tactical air force for the forthcoming invasion of Europe, with the 455th arriving at RAF Earls Colne on 14 June. The squadron began operations with Eighth Air Force in July 1943 as part of the first raid on the European continent by B-26s. When Ninth Air Force moved to the United Kingdom in the fall of 1943, the squadron became part of it. It attacked airports, industrial factories, marshalling yards and military targets in France and the Low Countries. During Big Week the squadron attacked Leeuwarden and Venlo Airfields. The squadron also attacked V-weapons launch sites in France.

In preparation for Operation Overlord, the Invasion of Normandy, the 456th attacked coastal defenses and other targets in northwestern France. on D-Day it attacked lines of communication and fortifications on the coast. It was part of the aerial barrage during the opening stage of Operation Cobra, the breakout at Saint Lo.

In late August 1944, the squadron left England for Lessay Airfield, an advanced landing ground in France. From the continent, it began flying night missions, with its first night mission against batteries near Saint-Malo. It also carried out night missions against ammunition dumps and fuel storage areas. In September, it attacked fortifications near Brest, France, and as allied forces advanced across France, toward the Siegfried Line shifted its operations primarily to targets in eastern France. The squadron was awarded a Distinguished Unit Citation for striking transportation hubs used by the Wehrmacht to bring reinforcements to the Ardennes during the Battle of the Bulge.

The 456th flew interdiction missions in the Ruhr as the Allies drove across Germany and attacked enemy communications. It flew its last combat in April 1945, then moved to Kempten, Germany, where it participated in the program to disarm Germany. It returned to the United States in November and was inactivated at Camp Myles Standish, Massachusetts, the port of embarkation, a day later.

=== Air Force Reserve ===
The squadron was reactivated under Air Defense Command (ADC) as a reserve unit at Tinker Field in September 1947. At Tinker, it trained under the supervision of ADC's 177th AAF Base Unit (Reserve Training), later the 2592d Air Force Reserve Training Center. It is not clear whether or not the squadron was fully staffed or equipped prior to 1949. The squadron flew a mix of trainers and Douglas A-26 Invaders.

In 1948 Continental Air Command (ConAC) assumed responsibility for managing reserve and Air National Guard units from ADC. ConAC reorganized its reserve units under the wing base organization system in June 1949. The new wings were manned at only 25% of their normal strength. All reserve combat units were mobilized for the Korean war. The squadron was mobilized on 10 March 1951. Its personnel and aircraft were used as fillers for other organizations and the squadron was inactivated a week later.

=== Strategic Air Command ===
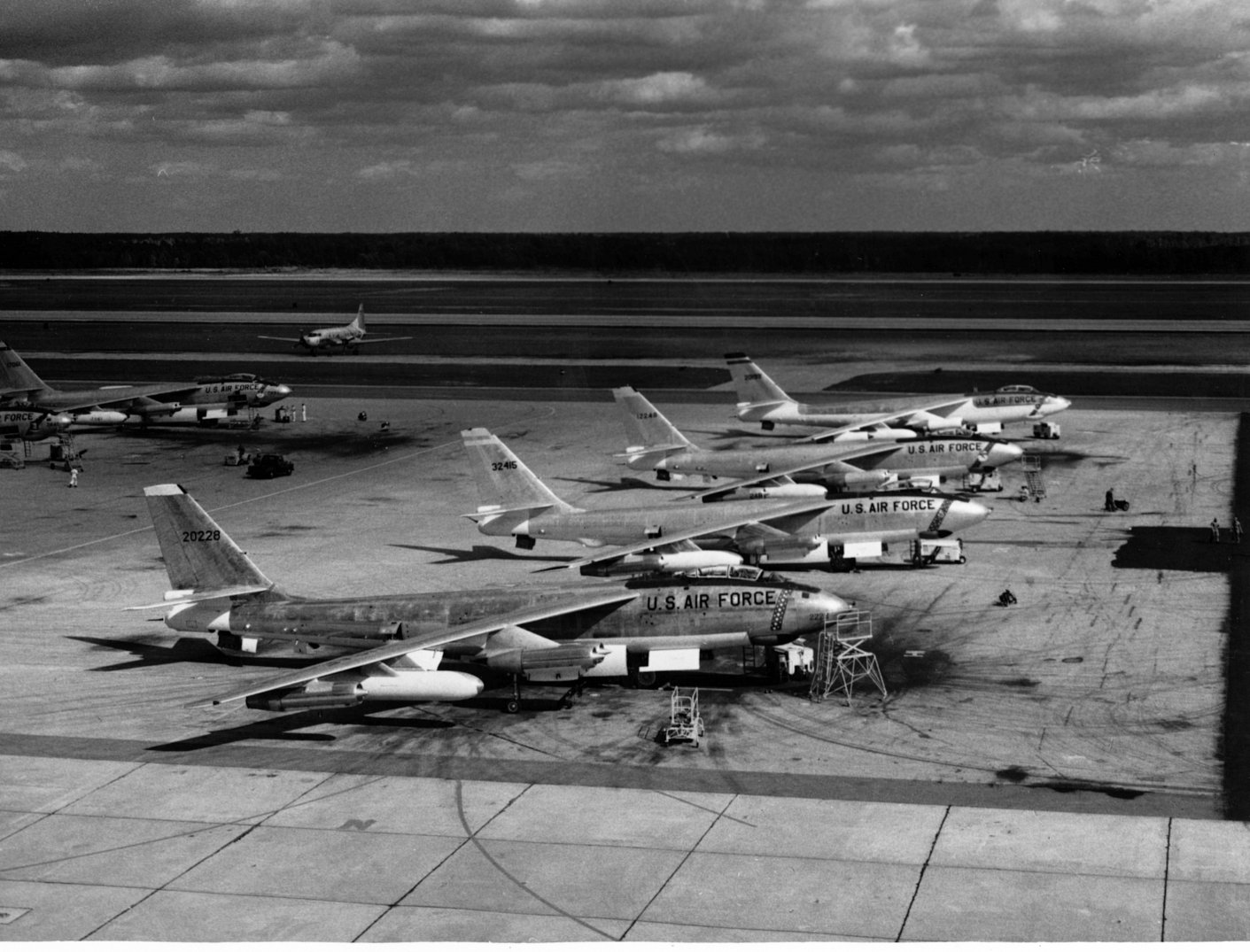
B-47Es of Strategic Air Command

The 656th Bombardment Squadron, the second predecessor of the 556th, was activated as part of the 68th Bombardment Wing at Lake Charles Air Force Base, Louisiana in 1953, when it assumed the personnel and equipment of the 24th Bombardment Squadron, which was simultaneously inactivated. (Note: SAC found itself with two 24th Bombardment Squadrons in June 1952, when the 68th Strategic Reconnaissance Wing became a bombardment wing. The 24th Bombardment Squadron, Medium was at Chennault, assigned to the 68th Wing, and the 24th Bombardment Squadron, Heavy was at Walker Air Force Base, assigned to the 6th Bombardment Wing. SAC elected to replace the squadron at Chennault. Maurer, Combat Squadrons, pp. 125-27.) The squadron took over the Boeing B-29 Superfortresses of the 24th, but began transitioning into the Boeing B-47 Stratojet by April when it received first production block of B-47Es. Along with its parent wing, the squadron deployed to RAF Fairford from June to August 1954. in 1957, Strategic Air Command (SAC) began implementing Operation Reflex. Reflex placed Stratojets and Boeing KC-97s at bases closer to the Soviet Union for 90 day periods, although individuals rotated back to home bases during unit Reflex deployments. Under this program, the squadron stood nuclear alert at RAF Brize Norton from September 1957 to January 1958.

From 1958, SAC's B-47 began to assume an alert posture at their home bases, reducing the amount of time spent on alert at overseas bases. General Thomas S. Power's set an initial goal of maintaining one third of SAC’s planes on fifteen minute ground alert, fully fueled and ready for combat to reduce vulnerability to a Soviet missile strike. The alert commitment was increased to half the squadron's aircraft in 1962. The 656th became non-operational in March 1963 and was inactivated in April as the B-47 began to be phased out of SAC's inventory and Chennault Air Force Base closed.

The 456th and 656th Bombardment Squadrons were consolidated as the 556th Tactical Air Support Squadron in September 1985, but the consolidated squadron has not been active.

== Lineage ==
456th Bombardment Squadron

- Constituted as the 456th Bombardment Squadron (Medium) on 19 June 1942

Activated on 4 August 1942
Redesignated 456th Bombardment Squadron, Medium in 1944
Inactivated on 26 November 1945
Redesignated 456th Bombardment Squadron, Light on 9 September 1947
Activated in the reserve on 26 September 1947
Ordered to active service 10 March 1951
Inactivated on 17 March 1951
Consolidated on 19 September 1985 with the 656th Bombardment Squadron as the 556th Tactical Air Support Squadron

556th Tactical Air Support Squadron

- Constituted as the 656th Bombardment Squadron, Medium in 1952

Activated on 16 January 1953
Inactivated on 15 April 1963
Consolidated on 19 September 1985 with the 456th Bombardment Squadron as the 556th Tactical Air Support Squadron

=== Assignments ===
- 323d Bombardment Group, 4 August 1942 – 26 November 1945
- 323d Bombardment Group, 26 September 1947 – 17 March 1951
- 68th Bombardment Wing, 16 January 1953 – 15 April 1963

=== Stations ===
- Columbia Army Air Base, South Carolina, 4 August 1942
- MacDill Field, Florida, 21 August 1942
- Myrtle Beach Bombing Range, South Carolina, 2 November 1942 – 25 April 1943
- RAF Horham (AAF-119), England, 13 May 1943
- RAF Earls Colne (AAF-358), England, 14 June 1943
- RAF Beaulieu (AAF-408), England, 21 July 1944
- Lessay Airfield (A-20), France, 26 August 1944
- Chartres Airfield (A-40), France, 21 September 1944
- Laon/Athies Airfield (A-69), France, 13 October 1944
- Denain/Prouvy Airfield (A-83), France, 9 February 1945
- AAF Station Gablingen (R-77), Germany, 15 May 1945
- Kempten, Germany, 20 May 1945
- Clastres Airfield (A-71), France, October-12 [November] 1945 (Note: >Maurer says December 1945, but that would keep the squadron in Europe until after it was inactivated in the United States.)
- Camp Myles Standish, Massachusetts, 25–26 November 1945
- Tinker Field (later Tinker Air Force Base), Oklahoma, 26 September 1947 – 17 March 1951
- Lake Charles Air Force Base (later Chennault Air Force Base), 16 January 1953 – 15 April 1963 (deployed to RAF Fairford, 14 June–7 August 1954; RAF Brize Norton, 27 September 1957 – 8 January 1958)

=== Aircraft ===
- Martin B-26 Marauder, 1942–1945
- Douglas A-26 (later B-26) Invader, by 1949–1951
- North American T-6 Texan, by 1949–1951
- Beechcraft T-7 Navigator, 1950–1951
- Beechcraft T-11 Kansan, by 1949–1951
- Boeing B-29 Superfortress, 1953
- Boeing B-47 Stratojet, 1953-1963

=== Awards and campaigns ===
Award streamer	Award	Dates	Notes
	Distinguished Unit Citation	24-27 December 1944	456th Bombardment Squadron

Campaign Streamer	Campaign	Dates	Notes
	Air Offensive, Europe	13 May 1943 – 5 June 1944	456th Bombardment Squadron
	Air Combat, EAME Theater	13 May 1943 – 11 May 1945	456th Bombardment Squadron
	Normandy	6 June 1944 – 24 July 1944	456th Bombardment Squadron
	Northern France	25 July 1944 – 14 September 1944	456th Bombardment Squadron
	Rhineland	15 September 1944 – 21 March 1945	456th Bombardment Squadron
	Ardennes-Alsace	16 December 1944 – 25 January 1945	456th Bombardment Squadron
	Central Europe	22 March 1944 – 21 May 1945	456th Bombardment Squadron
