= 454th Flying Training Squadron =

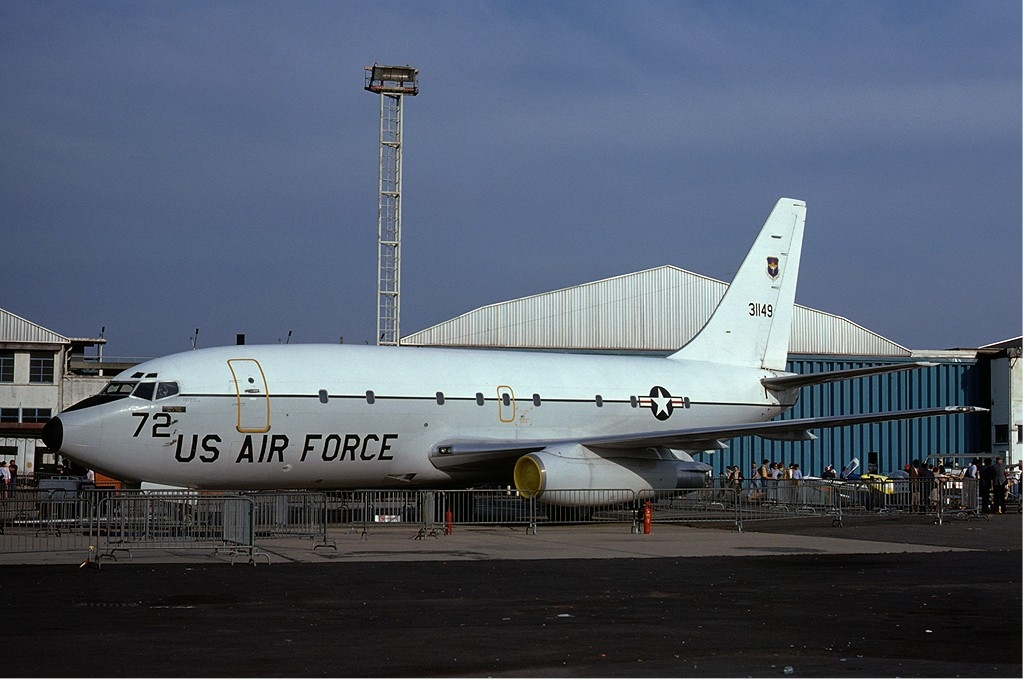
- T-43 Gator Navigator trainier
- Active: 1942–1945; 1949–1951; 1955–1957; 1973–1993
- Country: United States
- Branch: United States Air Force
- Role: Navigator training
- Motto: Set to Go (after 1956)
- Engagements: European Theater of Operations
- Decorations: Distinguished Unit Citation

Insignia
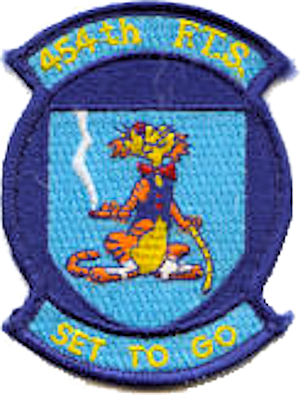
- Patch with 454th Flying Training Squadron emblem

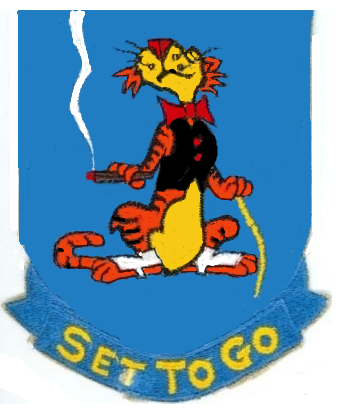
- 454th Fighter-Bomber Squadron emblem (Note: Approved 6 December 1956. Description: On a medium sky blue shield a caricatured tiger in natural colors, body bright orange, stomach and face golden yellow, nose red, facial outlines and stripes black, wearing black vest with red buttons, red bow tie and white spats; in his right paw a brown cigar with red tip and white smoke rising from it and in his left paw a yellow bamboo cane.)

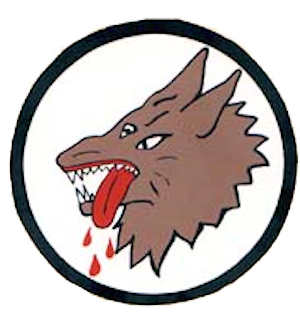
- 454th Bombardment Squadron emblem
- World War II fuselage code: RJ

The 454th Flying Training Squadron is an inactive United States Air Force unit. It was last assigned to the 323d Flying Training Wing at Mather Air Force Base, California, where it was inactivated on 31 May 1993.

The squadron was first activated in August 1942 as the 454th Bombardment Squadron. After training in the United States, it deployed to England, and later continental Europe, where it engaged in combat until the spring of 1945, earning a Distinguished Unit Citation for its actions during the Battle of the Bulge. Following V-E Day, it served in the occupation forces until returning to the United States, where it was inactivated in December 1945 upon arriving at the Port of Embarkation.

The squadron was activated in the reserves in June 1949. In March 1951 it was called to active duty for the Korean War. it was inactivated shortly thereafter and its personnel and equipment were used to fill out other units.

The squadron was redesignated the 454th Fighter-Bomber Squadron and activated at Bunker Hill Air Force Base in August 1955. It was inactivated in September 1957, when Bunker Hill was transferred from Tactical Air Command to Strategic Air Command.

The squadron was activated in April 1973 as the 454th Flying Training Squadron, training navigators at Mather Air Force Base. It was inactivated in May 1993, in preparation for the closure of Mather as navigator training was transferred to Randolph Air Force Base, Texas.

== History ==
=== World War II ===
==== Organization and training in the United States ====
The squadron was first activated as the 454th Bombardment Squadron at Columbia Army Air Base, South Carolina on 4 August 1942 as one of the four original squadrons of the 323d Bombardment Group. After Phase I training at MacDill Field, Florida with Martin B-26 Marauders, the squadron trained for combat at Myrtle Beach Bombing Range, South Carolina until late April 1943, when the ground echelon departed Myrtle Beach for England, sailing on the RMS Queen Elizabeth on 5 May. The air echelon of the squadron had moved to Baer Field, Indiana in February. At Baer, it received new B-26Cs, then proceeded to the United Kingdom via the South Atlantic ferry route by June.

==== Combat in Europe ====
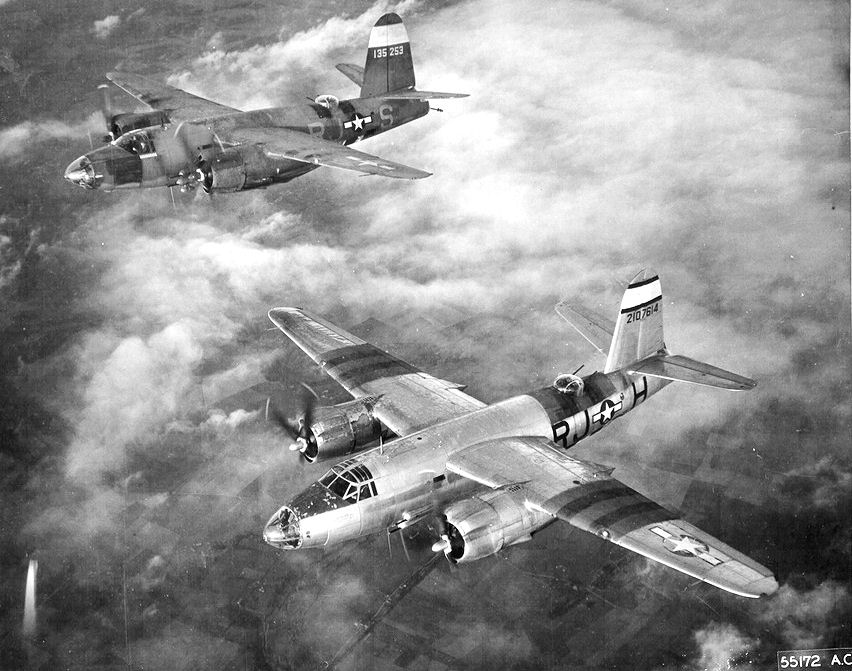
Squadron B-26C Marauders (Note: In foreground, Martin B-26C-45-MO Marauder, serial 42-107614, RJ-H, Lady Luck III. This plane's hydraulics were shot out on a mission on 23 December 1944 and the crew bailed out. Baugher, Joe (7 August 2023). "1942 USAF Serial Numbers". Joe Baugher. In background, Martin B-26C-25-MO Marauder, serial 41-35253, RJ-S, Black Magic IV, Mr. Shorty This plane survived the war and was condemned to salvage in England on 1 June 1945. Baugher, Joe (10 August 2023). "1941 USAF Serial Numbers". Joe Baugher. Taken on 6 December 1944.)

The squadron arrived at its first combat station, RAF Horham, in May 1943. In June 1943, the squadron, along with all other B-26 units in England, moved to Essex, an area where it was planned to build up a tactical air force for the forthcoming invasion of Europe, with the 454th arriving at RAF Earls Colne on 14 June. It began operations with Eighth Air Force in July 1943 as part of the first medium altitude raid (Note: The 322d Bombardment Group had made two disastrous low level raids on targets in the Netherlands in May 1943, after which it was withdrawn from combat and trained for medium altitude operations. Freeman, p. 35.) on the European continent by B-26s. When Ninth Air Force moved to the United Kingdom in the fall of 1943, the squadron became part of it. It attacked airports, industrial factories, marshalling yards and military targets in France and the Low Countries. During Big Week the squadron attacked Leeuwarden and Venlo Airfields. The squadron also attacked V-weapons launch sites in France.

In preparation for Operation Overlord, the invasion of Normandy, the 454th attacked coastal defenses and other targets in northwestern France. on D-Day it attacked lines of communication and fortifications on the coast. It was part of the aerial barrage during the opening stage of Operation Cobra, the breakout at Saint Lo.

In late August 1944, the squadron left England for Lessay Airfield, an advanced landing ground in France. From the continent, it began flying night missions, with its first night mission against batteries near Saint-Malo. It also carried out night missions against ammunition dumps and fuel storage areas. In September, it attacked fortifications near Brest, France, and as allied forces advanced across France, toward the Siegfried Line shifted its operations primarily to targets in eastern France. The squadron was awarded a Distinguished Unit Citation for striking transportation hubs used by the Wehrmacht to bring reinforcements to the Ardennes during the Battle of the Bulge.

The 454th flew interdiction missions in the Ruhr as the Allies drove across Germany and attacked enemy communications. It flew its last combat in April 1945, then moved to Innsbruck Airfield, Austria, where it participated in the program to disarm Germany. It returned to the United States in November and was inactivated at Camp Myles Standish, Massachusetts, the port of embarkation, a day later.

=== Reserve operations ===
The squadron was reactivated under Continental Air Command (ConAC) as a reserve unit at Tinker Air Force Base in June 1949, when ConAC reorganized its reserve units under the wing base organization system. At Tinker, it trained under the supervision of ConAC's 2592d Air Force Reserve Training Center. The squadron flew a mix of trainers and Douglas A-26 Invaders. The unit was manned at only 25% of its normal strength. All reserve combat units, including the 454th, were mobilized for the Korean War. The squadron was mobilized on 10 March 1951. Its personnel and aircraft were used as fillers for other organizations and the squadron was inactivated a week later.

=== Fighter operations ===
The squadron was redesignated the 454th Fighter-Bomber Squadron and activated at Bunker Hill Air Force Base, Indiana on 8 August 1955, when the Air Force reopened the base, a former World War II Navy training station. The squadron was initially equipped with North American F-86 Sabres, but soon began upgrading to the supersonic North American F-100 Super Sabre. However, the squadron, along with all other elements of the 323d Fighter-Bomber Wing, was inactivated on 1 September 1957, when Tactical Air Command transferred Bunker Hill to Strategic Air Command.

=== Navigator training ===
On 1 April 1973, the squadron was activated as the 454th Flying Training Squadron. It continued to conduct undergraduate navigator training for USAF, United States Navy, United States Marine Corps, and United States allies until 1993. In 1989, the base closure commission recommended that Mather be closed. The Air Force moved its navigator training to Randolph Air Force Base, Texas and the squadron was inactivated on 31 May 1993 as Mather drew down in preparing for closing on 1 October 1993.

== Lineage ==
- Constituted as the 454th Bombardment Squadron (Medium) on 19 June 1942

Activated on 4 August 1942
Redesignated 454th Bombardment Squadron, Medium c. 20 August 1943
Inactivated on 26 November 1945

- Redesignated 454th Bombardment Squadron, Light on 10 May 1949

Activated in the reserve on 27 June 1949
Ordered to active service 10 March 1951
Inactivated on 17 March 1951

- Redesignated 454th Fighter-Bomber Squadron on 9 May 1955

Activated on 8 August 1955
Inactivated on 1 September 1957

- Redesignated 454th Flying Training Squadron on 28 July 1972

Activated on 1 April 1973
Inactivated on 31 May 1993

=== Assignments ===
- 323d Bombardment Group, 4 August 1942 – 26 November 1945
- 323d Bombardment Group, 27 June 1949 – 17 March 1951
- 323d Fighter-Bomber Group, 8 August 1955 – 1 September 1957
- 323d Flying Training Wing, 1 April 1973
- 323d Operations Group, 15 December 1991 – 31 May 1993

=== Stations ===
- Columbia Army Air Base, South Carolina, 4 August 1942
- MacDill Field, Florida, 21 August 1942
- Myrtle Beach Bombing Range, South Carolina, 2 November 1942 – 25 April 1943
- RAF Horham (AAF-119), England, 12 May 1943
- RAF Earls Colne (AAF-358), England, 14 June 1943
- RAF Beaulieu (AAF-408), England, 21 July 1944
- Lessay Airfield (A-20), France, 26 August 1944
- Chartres Airfield (A-40), France, 21 September 1944
- Laon/Athies Airfield (A-69), France, 13 October 1944
- Denain/Prouvy Airfield (Valenciennes) (A-83), France, 9 February 1945
- Innsbruck Airfield (R-88), Austria, c. 15 May 1945
- Nesselwang, Germany, 9 July 1945
- Schongau, Bavaria (R-79), Germany, c. July 1945
- Clastres Airfield (A-71), France, October – c. 12 December 1945
- Camp Myles Standish, Massachusetts, 11–12 December 1945
- Tinker Air Force Base, Oklahoma, 26 September 1947 – 17 March 1951
- Bunker Hill Air Force Base, Indiana, 8 August 1955 – 1 September 1957
- Mather Air Force Base, California, 1 April 1973 – 31 May 1993

=== Aircraft ===
- Martin B-26 Marauder, 1942–1945
- Douglas B-26 Invader, 1947–1951
- North American F-86 Sabre, 1955–1956
- North American F-100 Super Sabre, 1957-1957
- Convair T-29 Flying Classroom 1973-1975
- Boeing T-43 Gator 1973-1993

=== Awards and campaigns ===
Award streamer	Award	Dates	Notes
	Distinguished Unit Citation	24–27 December 1944	Belgium and Germany, 454th Bombardment Squadron
	Air Force Outstanding Unit Award	1 April – 31 December 1973	454th Flying Training Squadron
	Air Force Outstanding Unit Award	1 January 1976 – 28 February 1977	454th Flying Training Squadron
	Air Force Outstanding Unit Award	1 January 1978 – 30 April 1979	454th Flying Training Squadron
	Air Force Outstanding Unit Award	1 January 1980 – 30 April 1981	454d Flying Training Squadron

Campaign Streamer	Campaign	Dates	Notes
	Air Offensive, Europe	12 May 1943–5 June 1944	454th Bombardment Squadron
	Air Combat, EAME Theater	14 May 1943–11 May 1945	454th Bombardment Squadron
	Normandy	6 June 1944–24 July 1944	454th Bombardment Squadron
	Northern France	25 July 1944–14 September 1944	454th Bombardment Squadron
	Rhineland	15 September 1944–21 March 1945	454th Bombardment Squadron
	Ardennes-Alsace	16 December 1944–25 January 1945	454th Bombardment Squadron
	Central Europe	22 March 1944–21 May 1945	454th Bombardment Squadron
