= 98th Combat Bombardment Wing =

98th Bombardment Wing
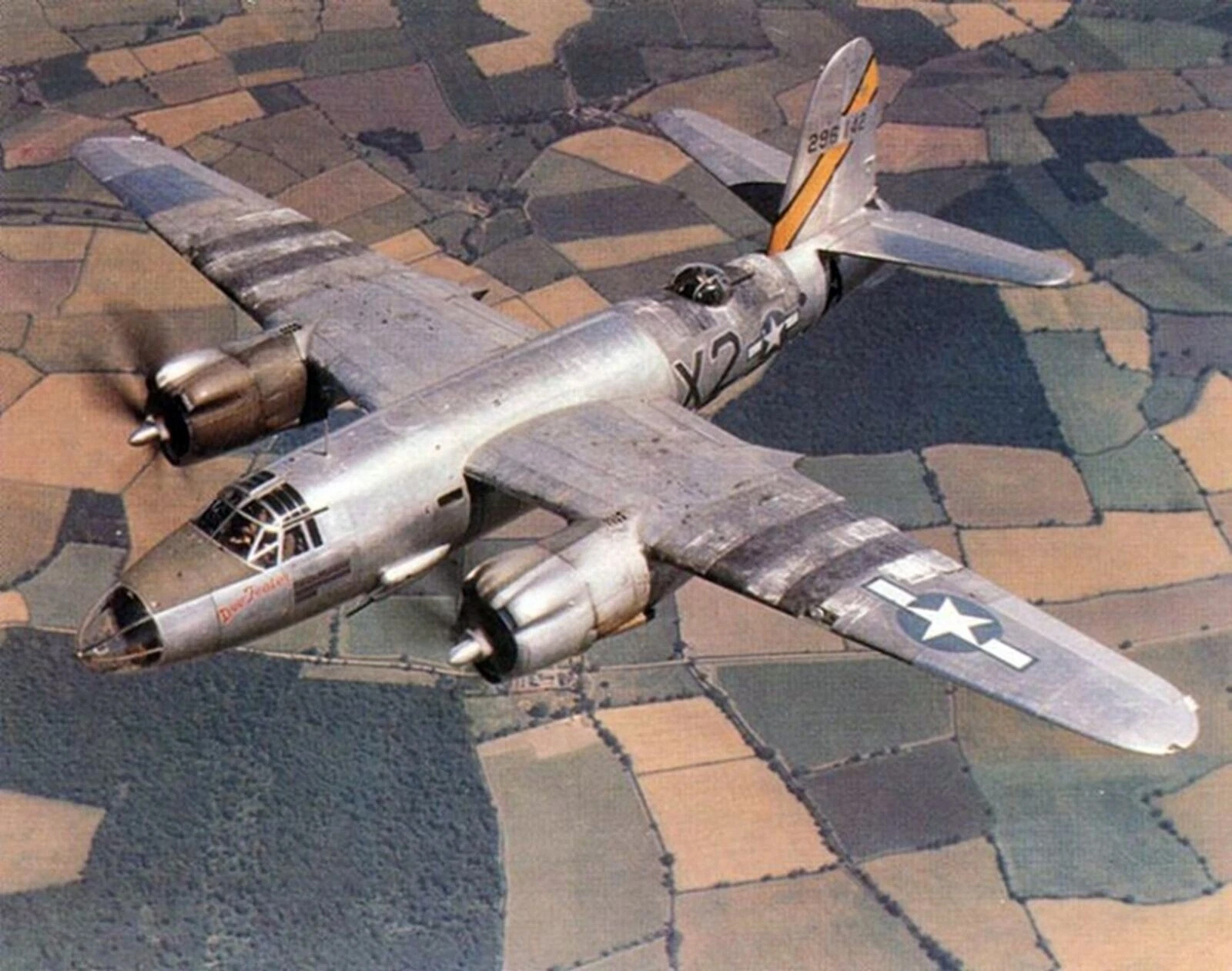
- Martin B-26B Marauder (42-96142). The aircraft was assigned to the 596th Bomb Squadron, 397th Bomb Group,98th Bomb Wing
- Active: 1923–1949
- Country: United States
- Branch: United States Army Air Forces
- Role: Medium Bomber Command and Control

Insignia
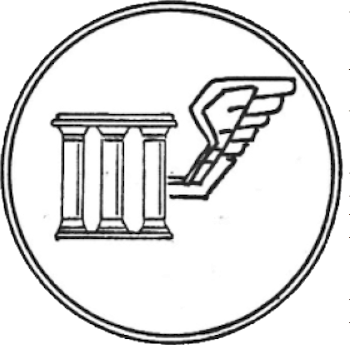
- 3d Bombardment Wing emblem

The 98th Bombardment Wing is an inactive United States Army Air Forces unit. Its last assignment was with the United States Air Force Reserve, based at Bedford Field, Massachusetts. It was inactivated on 27 June 1949.

== History ==
As the 3d Wing, the unit was one of the original wings of the GHQ Air Force on 1 March 1935. It was formed in Texas, reassigned to Barksdale Field, Louisiana. Performed peacetime training operations. Assigned to MacDill Field, Florida, 1940 and assigned to USAAC Southeast Air District, becoming part of III Bomber Command just prior to World War II.

It was deployed to England and was reassigned to VIII Bomber Command in June 1942 as a medium Bomber command and control organization component units being equipped with Martin B-26 Marauders.

It was redesignated as the 98th Combat Bombardment Wing (Medium) in November 1943. The wing was reassigned to Ninth Air Force when 9th was reformed in England as tactical air force to support ground forces in upcoming invasion of France. Performed combat operations supporting allied ground forces until V-E Day

It served postwar as an Air Force reserve unit, 1947–1949.

=== Lineage ===
- Authorized on the inactive list as 3d Wing on 24 March 1923

Redesignated as: 3d Attack Wing in 1929
Activated on 15 June 1932
Redesignated as 3d Wing in 1935
Redesignated 3d Bombardment Wing in 1940
Inactivated on 5 September 1941

- Activated on 7 June 1942

Redesignated as: 98th Combat Bombardment Wing (Medium) in November 1943
Redesignated as: 98th Bombardment Wing (Medium) in June 1945
Inactivated on 27 November 1945.

- Redesignated 3d Bombardment Wing (Light) and allotted to the reserve

Activated on 20 December 1946
Redesignated 3d Air Division (Bombardment) in April 1948
Inactivated on 27 June 1949

=== Assignments ===
- United States Army Air Corps, 15 June 1932
- General Headquarters Air Force, 1 March 1935
- Southeast Air District, 2 October 1940
- III Bomber Command, 5 September 1941
- VIII Bomber Command, 7 June 1942
- VIII Air Support Command, 1943
- IX Bomber Command, 16 October 1943 – 27 November 1945
- United States Air Force Reserve, 20 December 1946 – 27 June 1949

=== Stations ===
- Fort Crockett, Texas, 15 June 1932
- Barksdale Field, Louisiana, 27 February 1935
- MacDill Field, Florida, 2 October 1940 – 5 September 1941
- Detrick Field, Maryland, 7 June–August 1942
- Elvedon Hall (AAF-116), England, c. 12 September 1942
- Marks Hall (AAF-160), England, 12 June 1943
- RAF Earls Colne (AAF-358), England, November 1943
- RAF Beaulieu (AAF-408), England, 18 July – 19 August 1944
- Lessay Airfield (A-20), France, 23 August 1944
- Chartres Airfield (A-40), France, 24 September 1944
- Laon/Athies Airfield (A-69), France, 3 October 1944
- Havrincourt, France, 1 February 1945
- Venlo Airfield (Y-55), Netherlands, c. 3 May 1945
- Tienen, Belgium, c. July 1945
- AAF Station Kitzingen, Germany, August 1945
- Namur Airfield, Belgium, c. October–November 1945
- Bedford Field, Massachusetts, 20 December 1946 – 27 June 1949

=== Components ===
- GHQ Air Force (Air Force Combat Command, 1941)

3d Bombardment Group: 1932–1940
13th Bombardment Group: 1941
10th Pursuit Group: 1932–1939
29th Bombardment Group: 1940–1941
44th Bombardment Group: 1941

- VIII Bomber Command

322d Bombardment Group: 1 December 1942 – 16 October 1943
323d Bombardment Group: 1 May – 16 October 1943
386th Bombardment Group: 3 June – 16 October 1943
387th Bombardment Group: 25 June – 16 October 1943

- Ninth Air Force

323d Bombardment Group: 16 October 1943 – 16 July 1945 (B-26 Marauder)
387th Bombardment Group: 16 October 1943 – November 1945 (B-26 Marauder)
394th Bombardment Group: 11 March 1944 – September 1945 (B-26 Marauder)
397th Bombardment Group: 15 April 1944 – November 1945 (B-26 Marauder)
305th Bombardment Group: 1945 (B-17 Flying Fortress)
306th Bombardment Group: 1945 (B-17 Flying Fortress)

- Air Force Reserve

310th Bombardment Group: 1947–1949
341st Bombardment Group: 1947–1949
