= 323d Expeditionary Operations Group =

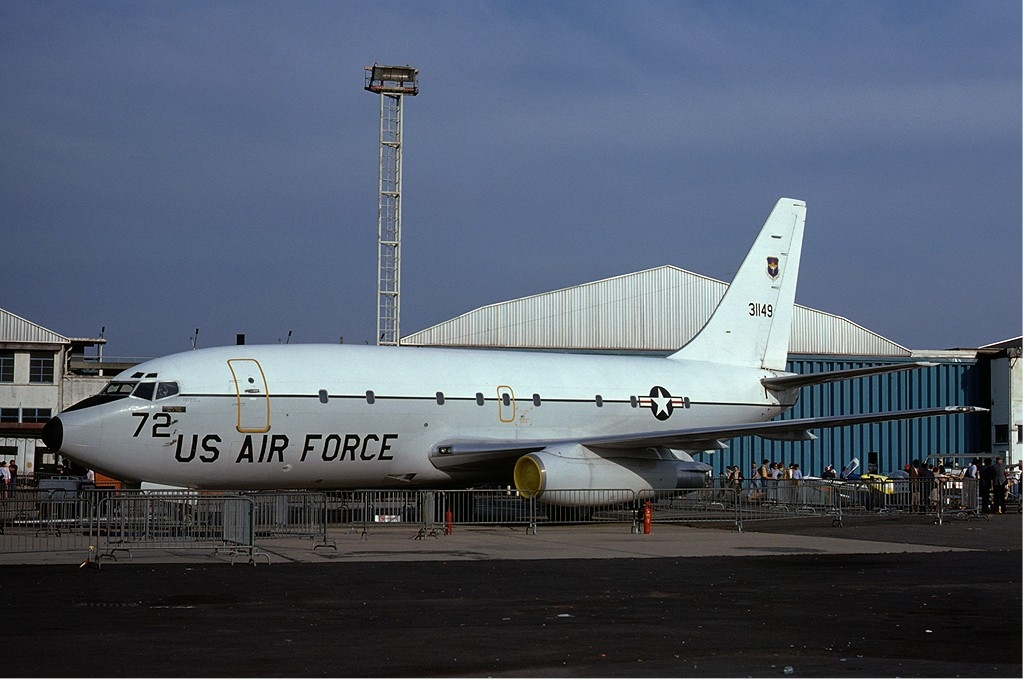
- Boeing T-43 navigator trainer
- Active: 1942–1993
- Country: United States
- Branch: United States Air Force
- Role: Expeditionary operations
- Part of: United States Air Forces Europe
- Nickname: White Tails (World War II)
- Motto: Vincamus Sine Timoris Latin We Conquer Without Fear
- Decorations: Distinguished Unit Citation

Insignia
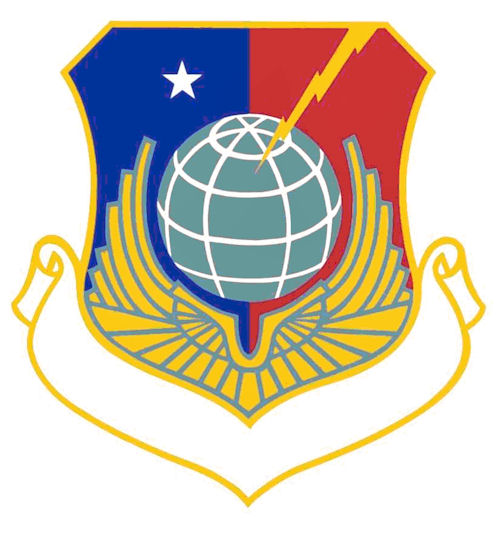
- 323d Air Expeditionary Group emblem: (approved 25 September 1973) (Note: The group uses the wing emblem with the group designation on the scroll. Robertson, AFHRA Facsheet)

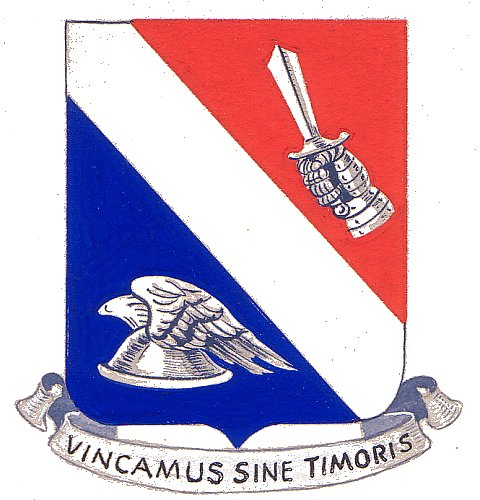
- 323d Bombardment Group emblem (Approved 16 February 1943)
- Tail marking (World War II): Horizontal white band

The 323d Expeditionary Operations Group is a provisional United States Air Force unit assigned to the United States Air Forces in Europe. As a provisional unit, it may be activated or inactivated at any time.

During World War II, the group's predecessor unit, the 323d Bombardment Group was a Martin B-26 Marauder bombardment group assigned to the Eighth and later Ninth Air Force. The group served in the European Theater of Operations, earning a Distinguished Unit Citation for its actions interdicting German reinforcements during the Battle of the Bulge. After VE Day, the group returned to the United States where it was inactivated. From 1947 to 1951 the group was active in the Air Force Reserves. It was called to active duty for the Korean War, but was inactivated after its personnel were used to bring other units up to full strength.

The group was again active during the 1950s as the 323d Fighter-Bomber Group, flying North American F-86 Sabres and North American F-100 Super Sabres at Bunker Hill Air Force Base, Indiana. It remained inactive until 1991, when it became the 323d Operations Group at Mather Air Force Base, California, where it trained navigators until it was inactivated in 1993.

== History ==
=== World War II ===
- Media related to 323d Bombardment Group (United States Army Air Forces) at Wikimedia Commons

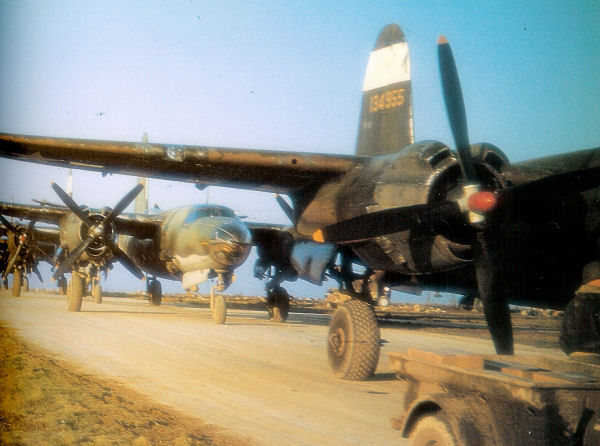
Martin B-26 Marauders of the 455th Bomb Squadron line up on the perimeter track at RAF Earls Colne, 1944.

==== Training in the United States ====
The unit was first activated in August 1942 at Columbia Army Air Base, South Carolina as the 323d Bombardment Group with the 453d, 454th, 455th and 456th Bombardment Squadron assigned as its original squadrons. It trained under Third Air Force in the southeastern United States with Martin B-26 Marauders. The group moved to England beginning in April 1943. The flight echelons few via the southern ferry route except for that of the 456th Squadron, which flew the northern route. The ground echelon sailed on the RMS Queen Elizabeth.

==== Combat in the European Theater ====
The group arrived at RAF Horham in Suffolk on 12 May 1943. The group was assigned to the Eighth Air Force's 3d Bombardment Wing, part of VIII Bomber Command.

In June 1943, the group and all other Eighth Air Force B-26 units became part of VIII Air Support Command and relocated south to bring them closer to the continent of Europe and the area in which it was planned to establish an American tactical Air force. The group moved to RAF Earls Colne, where it replaced the 94th Bombardment Wing. in June 1943 and inaugurated medium-altitude bombing missions on 16 July 1943, the first medium bomber missions flown by Eighth Air Force at medium altitude, in contrast to the low altitude attacks the unit had trained for in the States. During the summer of 1943 its principal targets were marshalling yards, airfields, industrial plants, military installations, and other targets in France, Belgium, and the Netherlands.

Along with other Marauder units of the 3d Wing, the 323d transferred to Ninth Air Force in October 1943, which moved from Egypt to absorb the resources of VIII Air Support Command. The group flew missions against V-1 flying bomb and V-2 rocket sites along the coast of France and attacked airfields at Leeuwarden and Venlo in conjunction with the Allied campaign against the Luftwaffe and aircraft industry during Big Week, from 20 to 25 February 1944.

The 323d helped to prepare for Operation Overlord, the invasion of Normandy, by bombing coastal defenses, marshalling yards, and airfields in France and struck roads and coastal batteries on D-Day, 6 June 1944. On 21 July the group moved south to RAF Beaulieu in Hampshire, a move designed to extend its range over western France. The group participated in the aerial attacks supporting Operation Cobra the breakout at Saint Lo and began flying night missions against fuel and ammunition dumps.

Between 16 and 26 August, the 323d moved to Lessay Airfield in France, the main movement of aircraft taking place on the 26th. The group struck strong points at Brest and supported the advance on the Siegfried Line. During the Battle of the Bulge, the 323d hit transportation targets to prevent enemy reinforcements from reaching the Ardennes, earning a Distinguished Unit Citation for its efforts.

As Allied forces advanced into Germany, the group struck interdiction targets in the Ruhr. By VE Day, the group was based at AAF Station Gablingen, Germany and participated in the disarmament program. The group returned to the United States in December and was inactivated at the port of embarkation on 12 December 1945.

=== Air Force Reserve ===
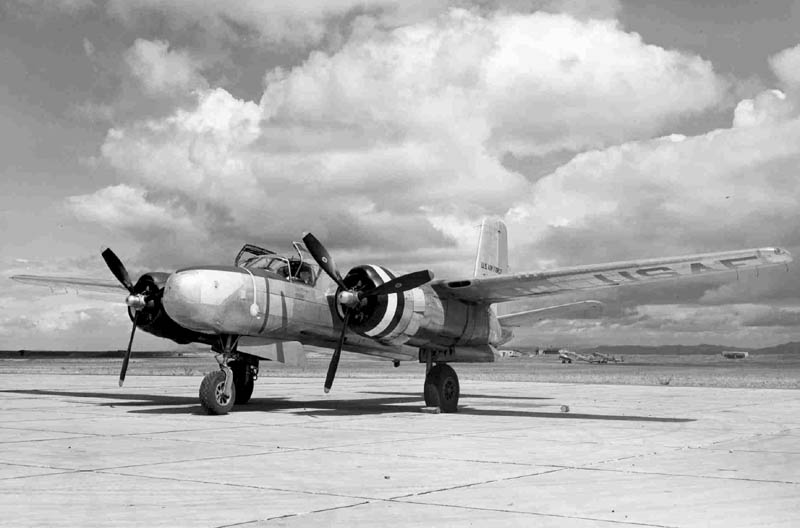
A-26 of the Air Force Reserve

The group was activated in September 1947 in the Air Force Reserve at Tinker Air Force Base, Oklahoma. The group was equipped with the Douglas A-26 Invader light bombardment aircraft and trained under the supervision of the 177th AF Base Unit (later the 2592d Air Force Reserve Training Center). In June 1949, when Continental Air Command implemented the wing base organization, the group was assigned to the 323d Bombardment Wing. The wing was manned at 25% of normal strength but the group was authorized four squadrons rather than the three of active duty units. All reserve combat units were mobilized for the Korean war. The group and was ordered to active duty in the second wave of reserve mobilizations for the Korean War on 10 March 1951. Its personnel were used as fillers for other units, with Strategic Air Command receiving first choice, and the group was inactivated a week later.

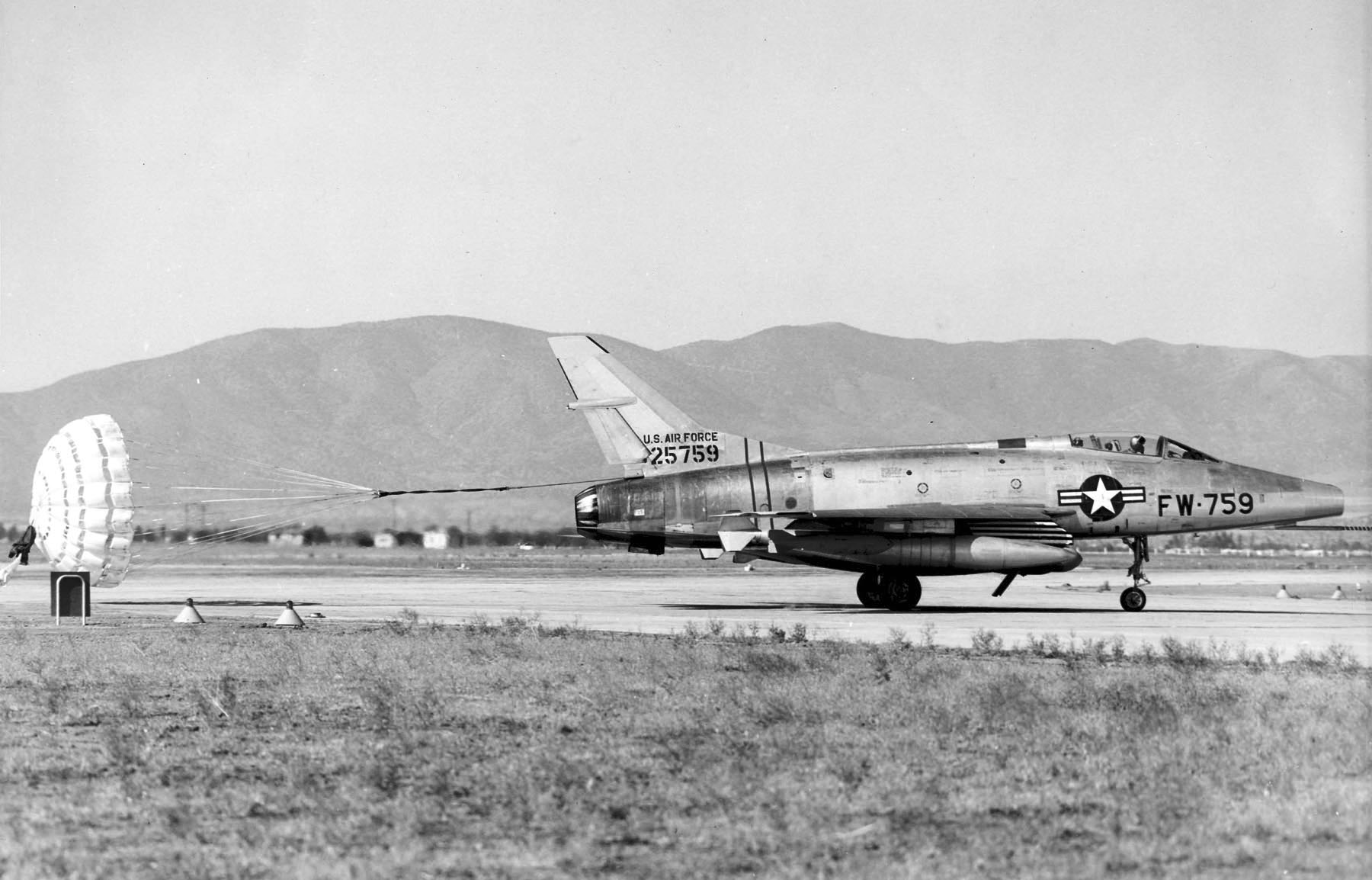
North American F-100A landing with drag chute

=== Fighter operations ===
The group was redesignated the 323d Fighter-Bomber Group and activated at Bunker Hill Air Force Base, Indiana in August 1955. It initially trained with North American F-86F Sabres, these were quickly upgraded to the F-86H Sabre and then to the North American F-100 Super Sabre The 323d inactivated on 1 September 1957, when the base was transferred to Strategic Air Command.

=== Navigator Training ===
On 15 December 1991, Air Training Command implemented the Objective Wing concept at Mather Air Force Base and the group was reactivated as the 323d Operations Group of the 323d Flying Training Wing. The Base Realignment and Closure directed that Mather close on 30 September 1993. Group squadrons began to inactivate in early 1992 and the group and its remaining squadrons were inactivated on 31 May 1993, and its mission and most of its Boeing T-43 aircraft were reassigned to the 12th Operations Group at Randolph Air Force Base, Texas.

=== Expeditionary operations ===
In March 2003, the group was converted to provisional status and renamed the 323d Expeditionary Operations Group. It was assigned to United States Air Forces Europe to activate and inactivated as needed for contingency operations, but there have been no reported activations of the unit.

== Lineage ==
- Constituted as the 323d Bombardment Group (Medium) on 19 June 1942

Activated on 4 August 1942

- Redesignated 323d Bombardment Group, Medium on 5 August 1944

Inactivated on 12 December 1945

- Redesignated 323d Bombardment Group, Light

Activated in the reserve on 9 September 1947
Ordered to active duty on 10 March 1951
Inactivated on 17 March 1951

- Redesignated 323d Fighter-Bomber Group on 9 May 1955

Activated on 8 August 1955
Inactivated on 1 September 1957

- Redesignated 323d Tactical Fighter Group on 31 July 1985 (not active)
- Redesignated 323d Operations Group

Activated on 1 September 1991
Inactivated on 31 May 1993

- Redesignated as 323d Expeditionary Operations Group and converted to provisional status on 25 March 2003

=== Assignments ===
- III Bomber Command, 4 August 1942 – 25 April 1943.
- 3d Bombardment Wing (later 98th Combat Bombardment Wing, 98th Bombardment Wing) by Spring 1942.
- IX Air Force Service Command, 15 June 1945
- United States Air Forces Europe, 25 November – 12 December 1945
- 310th Bombardment Wing (later 310th Air Division), 9 September 1947
- 323d Bombardment Wing, 10 May 1949 – 17 March 1951
- 323d Fighter-Bomber Wing, 8 August 1955 – 1 September 1957
- 323d Flying Training Wing, 15 December 1991 – 1 October 1993

=== Components ===
- 323d Operations Support Squadron: 15 December 1991 – 31 May 1993
- 450th Flying Training Squadron: 15 December 1991 – 10 November 1992
- 451st Flying Training Squadron: 15 December 1991 – 15 January 1992
- 452d Flying Training Squadron: 15 December 1991 – 31 May 1993
- 453d Bombardment Squadron (later 453d Fighter-Bomber Squadron, 453d Flying Training Squadron): 4 August 1942 – 12 December 1945; 10 May 1949 – 17 March 1951; 8 August 1955 – 1 September 1957; 15 December 1991 – 31 May 1993
- 454th Bombardment Squadron (later 454th Fighter-Bomber Squadron, 454th Flying Training Squadron): 4 August 1942 – 12 December 1945; 10 May 1949 – 17 March 1951; 8 August 1955 – 1 September 1957; 15 December 1991 – 31 May 1993
- 455th Bombardment Squadron(later 455th Fighter-Bomber Squadron, 455th Flying Training Squadron): 4 August 1942 – 12 December 1945; 10 May 1949 – 17 March 1951; 8 August 1955 – 1 September 1957; 15 December 1991 – 31 May 1993
- 456th Bombardment Squadron: 4 August 1942 – 12 December 1945; 26 September 1947 – 17 March 1951

=== Stations ===
- Columbia Army Air Base, South Carolina, 4 August 1942
- MacDill Field, Florida, 21 August 1942
- Myrtle Beach Bombing Range, South Carolina, 2 November 1942 – 25 April 1943
- RAF Horham (AAF-119), England, 1 May 1943
- RAF Earls Colne (AAF-358), England, 14 June 1943
- RAF Beaulieu (AAF-408), England, 21 July 1944
- Lessay Airfield (A-20), France, 26 August 1944
- Chartres Airfield (A-40), France, 21 September 1944
- Laon/Athies Airfield (A-69), France, 13 October 1944
- Denain/Prouvy Airfield (A-83), France, February 1945
- AAF Station Gablingen, Germany, 15 May 1945
- AAF Station Landsberg, Germany, 16 July 1945
- Clastres Airfield, France, October – December 1945
- Camp Myles Standish, 11–12 December 1945
- Tinker Air Force Base, Oklahoma, 27 June 1949 – 28 March 1951
- Bunker Hill Air Force Base, Indiana, 8 August 1955 – 1 September 1957
- Mather Air Force Base, California, 15 December 1991 – 31 May 1993

=== Aircraft ===
- Martin B-26 Marauder (1942–1945)
- Douglas B-26 Invader (1949–1951)
- North American F-86 Sabre (1955–1957)
- North American F-100 Super Sabre (1956–1957)
- Boeing T-43 (1991–1993)
- Cessna T-37 Tweet (1991–1993)

=== Awards and campaigns ===
Award streamer	Award	Dates	Notes
	Distinguished Unit Citation	24–27 December 1944	323d Bombardment Group

Campaign Streamer	Campaign	Dates	Notes
	Air Offensive, Europe	1 May 1943 – 5 June 1944	323d Bombardment Group
	Normandy	6 June 1944 – 24 July 1944	323d Bombardment Group
	Northern France	25 July 1944 – 14 September 1944	323d Bombardment Group
	Rhineland	15 September 1944 – 21 March 1945	323d Bombardment Group
	Ardennes-Alsace	16 December 1944 – 25 January 1945	323d Bombardment Group
	Central Europe	22 March 1944 – 21 May 1945	323d Bombardment Group
	Air Combat, EAME Theater	1 May 1943 – 11 May 1945	323d Bombardment Group

== See also ==
- List of Douglas A-26 Invader operators
- List of F-86 Sabre units
- List of F-100 units of the United States Air Force
- List of Martin B-26 Marauder operators
- List of United States Air Force Groups
