= 453d Electronic Warfare Squadron =

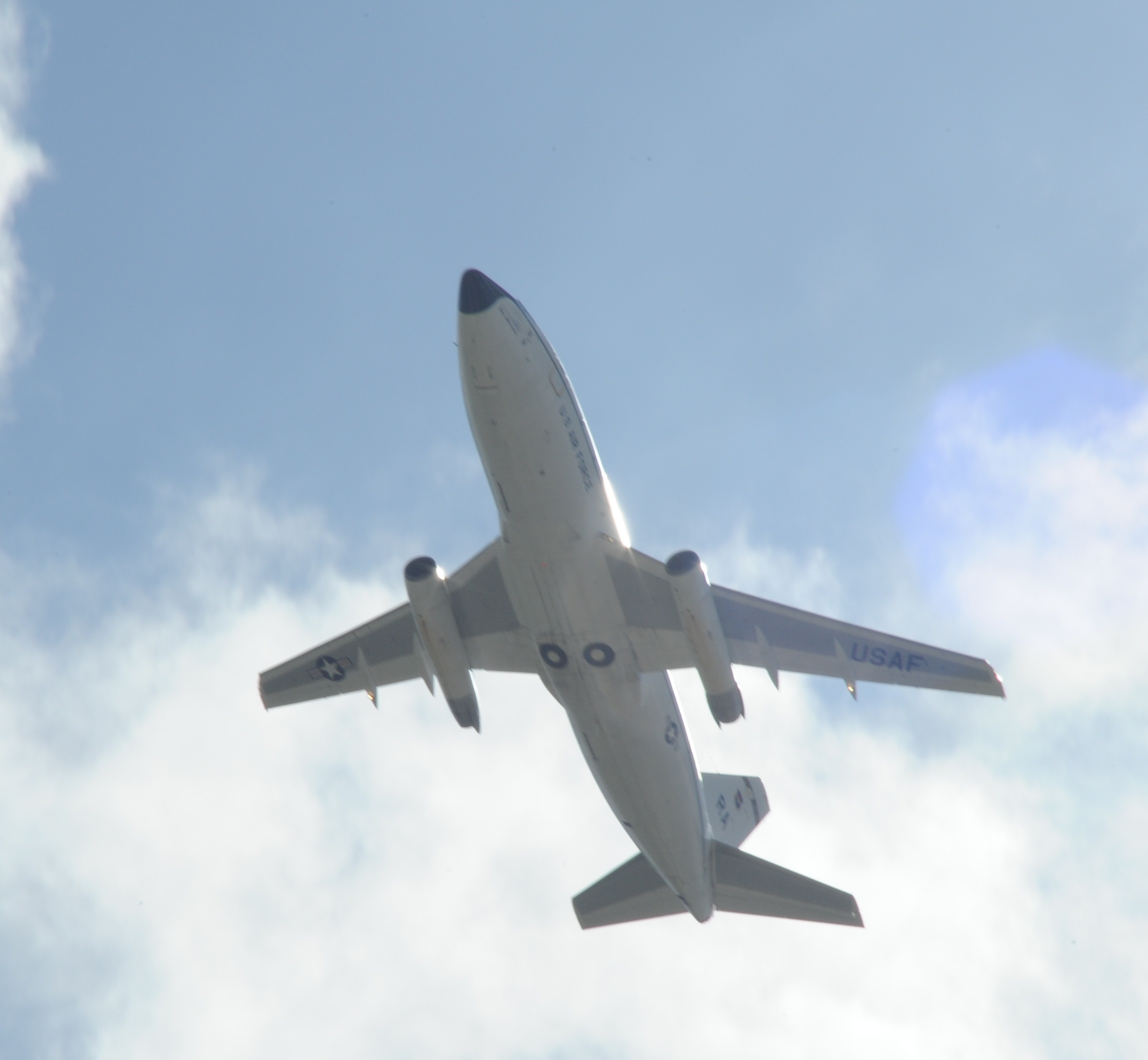
- Boeing T-43 as flown by the squadron in the 1990s
- Active: 1942-1945; 1949-1951; 1955-1957; 1973-1993; 2000–present
- Country: United States
- Branch: United States Air Force
- Role: Electronic Warfare
- Part of: Air Combat Command
- Garrison/HQ: Kelly Field Annex, Lackland Air Force Base, TX
- Motto: Every Crow a Tiger “Radars Beep Boop”
- Decorations: Distinguished Unit Citation; Air Force Outstanding Unit Award

Insignia
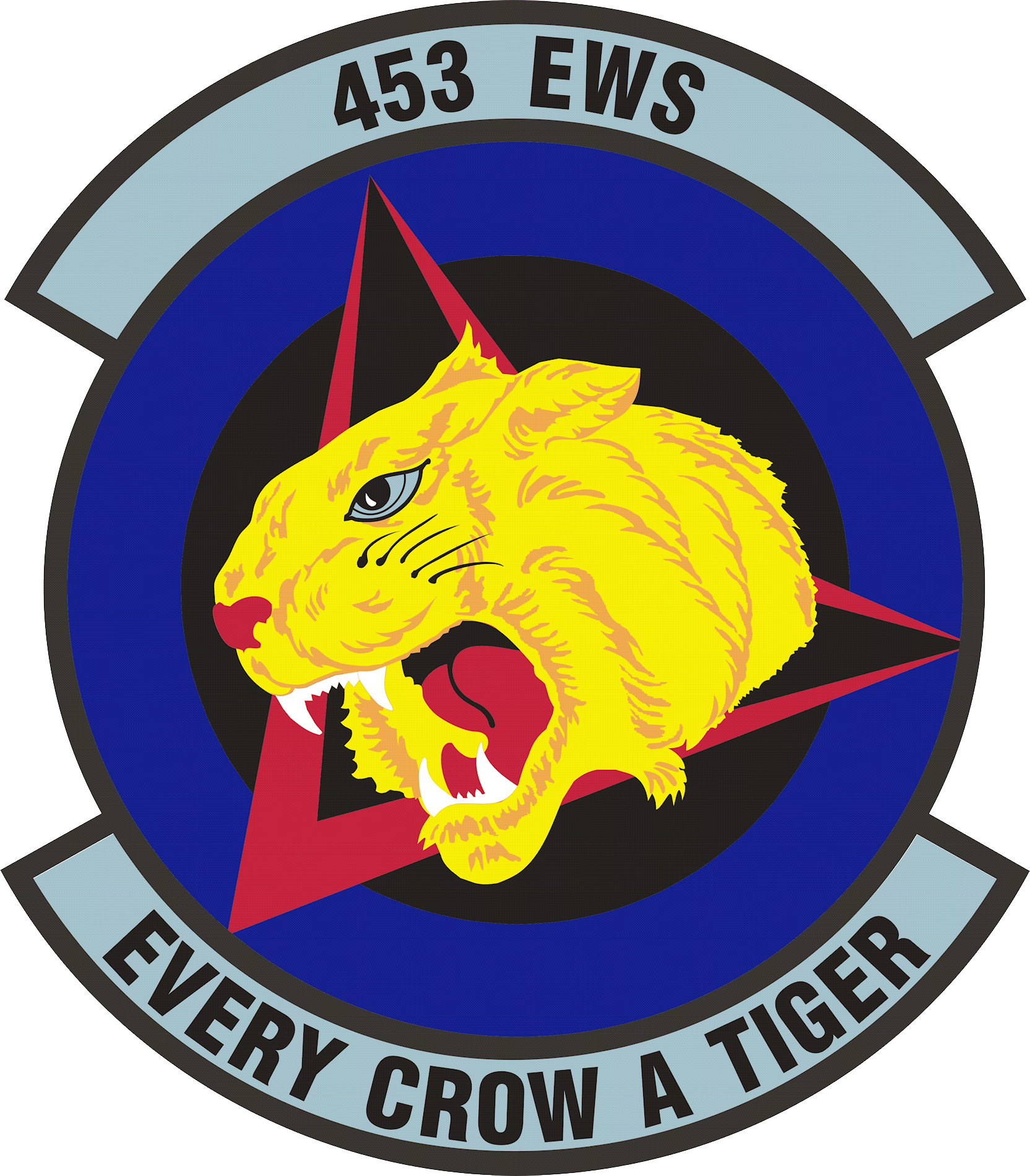
- 453d Electronic Warfare Squadron emblem (Note: Modified 8 April 2019 to put motto on top and unit designation on bottom scroll.)

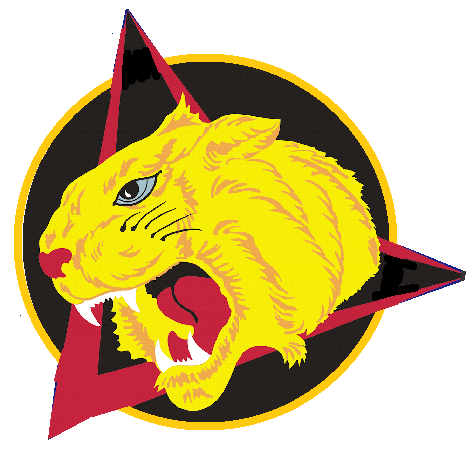
- 453d Fighter-Bomber Squadron emblem (Note: Approved 1 February 1957. Description: Over a black disc bordered Air Force yellow, a red V-shaped wedge pointing to dexter base; within the V-shaped wedge a smaller black V-shaped wedge, surmounting the wedge shaped figures and facing to dexter base, a snarling tiger's head, proper colors.)

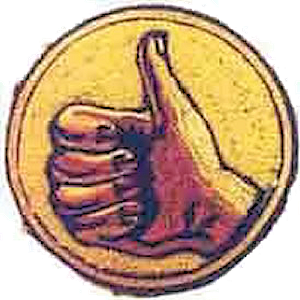
- 453d Bombardment Squadron emblem

The 453d Electronic Warfare Squadron is a United States Air Force unit. It is assigned to the 850th Spectrum Warfare Group and is stationed at Joint Base Lackland-San Antonio, Texas.

The squadron was first activated in August 1942 as the 453d Bombardment Squadron. After training in the United States, it deployed to England, and later continental Europe, where it engaged in combat until the spring of 1945, earning a Distinguished Unit Citation for its actions during the Battle of the Bulge. Following V-E Day, it served in the occupation forces until returning to the United States, where it was inactivated in December 1945 upon arriving at the Port of Embarkation.

The squadron was activated in the reserves in June 1949. In March 1951 it was called to active duty for the Korean War. it was inactivated shortly thereafter and its personnel and equipment were used to fill out other units.

The squadron was redesignated the 453d Fighter-Bomber Squadron and activated at Bunker Hill Air Force Base in August 1955. It was inactivated in September 1957, when Bunker Hill was transferred from Tactical Air Command to Strategic Air Command.

The squadron was activated in April 1973 as the 453d Flying Training Squadron, training navigators at Mather Air Force Base. It was inactivated in May 1993, in preparation for the closure of Mather as navigator training was transferred to Randolph Air Force Base, Texas. It was again activated with its current designation and at its current location in July 2000.

== Mission ==
The 453d Electronic Warfare Squadron detects changes to worldwide electromagnetic warfare threat to support reprogramming of countermeasures. It provides spectrum warfare products to the 350th Spectrum Warfare Wing and other entities. It designs and develops engineering systems to improve mission planning and debrief capabilities and analysis products to meet operational requirements.

The squadron builds and maintains an automated threat change detection system. It updates electronic warfare intelligence data analysis tools and dissemination methods to meet the needs of air force weapon systems. It provides operational training and test capabilities in a realistic contested, degraded, and operationally-limited (CDO) environment. It prepares for, builds, and maintains a multi-security level operational reconnaissance electronic warfare database for multiple users and develops, deploys, and sustains a threat change detection continuity of operations system.

== Organization ==
The 453rd Squadron is composed of an Analysis Flight, a Software Development Flight, a Cyber Defense Operations Flight, a Modeling, Simulation, and Analysis Engineering Flight, and a Plans and Programs division. The squadron is composed of active duty, reserve, national guard, Department of the Air Force civilians, and contractor personnel.

== History ==
=== World War II ===
==== Organization and training in the United States ====
The squadron was first activated as the 453d Bombardment Squadron at Columbia Army Air Base, South Carolina on 4 August 1942 as one of the four original squadrons of the 323d Bombardment Group. After Phase I training at MacDill Field, Florida with Martin B-26 Marauders, the squadron trained for combat at Myrtle Beach Bombing Range, South Carolina until late April 1943, when the ground echelon departed Myrtle Beach for England, sailing on the RMS Queen Elizabeth on 5 May. The air echelon of the squadron had moved to Baer Field, Indiana in February. At Baer, it received new B-26Cs, then proceeded to the United Kingdom via the South Atlantic ferry route by June.

==== Combat in Europe ====
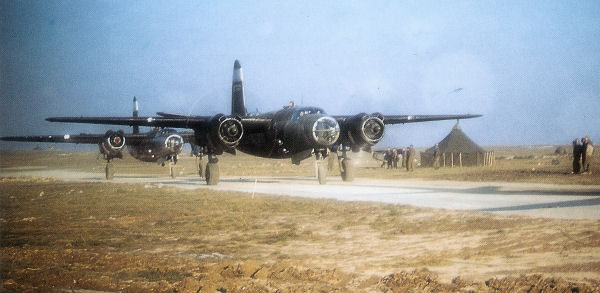
323d Bomb Group B-26s

The squadron arrived at its first combat station, RAF Horham, in May 1943. In June 1943, the squadron, along with all other B-26 units in England, moved to Essex, an area where it was planned to build up a tactical air force for the forthcoming invasion of Europe, with the 454th arriving at RAF Earls Colne on 14 June. It began operations with Eighth Air Force in July 1943 as part of the first medium altitude raid (Note: The 322d Bombardment Group had made two disastrous low level raids on targets in the Netherlands in May 1943, after which it was withdrawn from combat and trained for medium altitude operations. Freeman, p. 35.) on the European continent by B-26s. When Ninth Air Force moved to the United Kingdom in the fall of 1943, the squadron became part of it. It attacked airports, industrial factories, marshalling yards and military targets in France and the Low Countries. During Big Week the squadron attacked Leeuwarden and Venlo Airfields. The squadron also attacked V-weapons launch sites in France.

In preparation for Operation Overlord, the Invasion of Normandy, the 453d attacked coastal defenses and other targets in northwestern France. on D-Day it attacked lines of communication and fortifications on the coast. It was part of the aerial barrage during the opening stage of Operation Cobra, the breakout at Saint Lo.

In late August 1944, the squadron left England for Lessay Airfield, an advanced landing ground in France. From the continent, it began flying night missions, with its first night mission against batteries near Saint-Malo. It also carried out night missions against ammunition dumps and fuel storage areas. In September, it attacked fortifications near Brest, France, and as allied forces advanced across France, toward the Siegfried Line shifted its operations primarily to targets in eastern France. The squadron was awarded a Distinguished Unit Citation for striking transportation hubs used by the Wehrmacht to bring reinforcements to the Ardennes during the Battle of the Bulge.

The 453d flew interdiction missions in the Ruhr as the Allies drove across Germany and attacked enemy communications. It flew its last combat in April 1945, then moved to Kempten, Germany, where it participated in the program to disarm Germany. It returned to the United States in November and was inactivated at Camp Myles Standish, Massachusetts, the port of embarkation, a day later.

=== Air Force Reserve ===
The squadron was reactivated under Continental Air Command (ConAC) as a reserve unit at Tinker Air Force Base in June 1949, when ConAC reorganized its reserve units under the wing base organization system. At Tinker, it trained under the supervision of ConAC's 2592d Air Force Reserve Training Center. The squadron flew a mix of trainers and Douglas A-26 Invaders. The unit was manned at only 25% of its normal strength. All reserve combat units were mobilized for the Korean war. The squadron was mobilized on 10 March 1951. Its personnel and aircraft were used as fillers for other organizations and the squadron was inactivated a week later.

=== Fighter operations ===
The squadron was redesignated the 453d Fighter-Bomber Squadron and activated at Bunker Hill Air Force Base, Indiana on 8 August 1955, when the Air Force reopened the base, a former World War II Navy training station. The squadron was initially equipped with North American F-86 Sabres, but soon began upgrading to the supersonic North American F-100 Super Sabre the following year. However, the squadron, along with all other elements of the 323d Fighter-Bomber Wing was inactivated on 1 September 1957, when Tactical Air Command transferred Bunker Hill to Strategic Air Command.

=== Flying training ===
The squadron was reformed as the 453d Flying Training Squadron at Mather Air Force Base California in 1973. As part of the 323d Flying Training Wing, the 453d provided electronic warfare officer (EWO) training to newly winged or transitioning USAF navigators destined for EWO assignments in the Boeing B-52 Stratofortress, Rockwell B-1 Lancer, General Dynamics EF-111 Raven, Republic F-105D Wild Weasel, McDonnell F-4G Wild Weasel IV and V, Boeing RC-135W Rivet Joint, Boeing RC-135S Cobra Ball and Boeing RC-135U Combat Sent, Lockheed AC-130 Spectre, Lockheed MC-130 Combat Talon and Combat Shadow; Lockheed EC-130E Airborne Battle Command & Control Center and Lockheed EC-130H Compass Call, or other selected USAF aircraft. In 1989, the base closure commission recommended that Mather be closed. The Air Force moved its navigator training to Randolph Air Force Base, Texas and the squadron was inactivated on 31 May 1993 as Mather drew down in preparing for closing on 1 October 1993.

=== Electronic warfare ===
The squadron was redesignated the 453d Electronic Warfare Squadron and activated at Kelly Air Force Base, Texas on 1 August 2000 as a component of the 318th Information Operations Group, when the Air Force Information Warfare Center reorganized and the 318th Group was assigned the mission of making information warfare operational. It was formed from the AF Special Communications Center of Excellence's EW Effectiveness Analysis Mission (Comfy Coat).

In July 2020, Detachment 1 of the squadron, stationed at Eglin Air Force Base, Florida, was discontinued and its mission and personnel were transferred to the 39th Electronic Warfare Squadron, which was simultaneously activated.

== Lineage ==
- Constituted as the 453d Bombardment Squadron (Medium) on 19 June 1942

Activated on 4 August 1942
Redesignated 453d Bombardment Squadron, Medium c. 9 October 1944
Inactivated on 14 December 1945
Redesignated 453d Bombardment Squadron, Light on 10 May 1949
Activated in the reserve on 27 June 1949
Ordered to active service on 10 March 1951
Inactivated on 17 March 1951
Redesignated 453d Fighter-Bomber Squadron on 9 May 1955
Activated on 8 August 1955
Inactivated on 1 September 1957
Redesignated 453d Flying Training Squadron on 28 July 1972
Activated on 1 April 1973
Inactivated on 31 May 1993
Redesignated 453d Electronic Warfare Squadron on 17 July 2000
Activated 1 August 2000

.

=== Assignments ===
- 323d Bombardment Group, 4 August 1942 – 12 December 1945
- Unknown (probably 14th AAF Base Unit (Air Section, Boston Port of Embarkation)), 12–14 December 1945
- 323d Bombardment Group, 27 June 1949 – 17 March 1951
- 323d Fighter-Bomber Group, 8 August 1955 – 1 September 1957
- 323rd Flying Training Wing, 1 April 1973 – 15 December 1991
- 323d Operations Group, 15 December 1991 – 31 May 1993
- 318th Information Operations Group, 1 August 2000
- 53d Electronic Warfare Group, 18 August 2009
- 850th Spectrum Warfare Group 25 June 2021 – present

=== Stations ===
- Columbia Army Air Base, South Carolina, 4 August 1942
- MacDill Field, Florida 21 August 1942
- Myrtle Beach Bombing Range, South Carolina 3 November 1942
- Camp Kilmer, New Jersey, 26 April – 4 May 1943 (Note: Time at the Port of Embarkation is omitted in Maurer. Maurer, Combat Squadrons, p. 559.)
- RAF Horham, England (Station 119), 12 May 1943
- RAF Earls Colne, England (Station 358), 14 June 1943
- RAF Beaulieu, England (Station 408), 21 July 1944
- Lessay Airfield (A-20), France, 26 August 1944
- Chartres Airfield, France (A-40) also (Station 190), 21 September 1944
- Laon-Athies Airfield (A-69), France 13 October 1944
- Denain-Prouvy Airfield (A-83) also (B-74), France, 9 February 1945
- Gablingen Airfield (R-77), Germany, 15 May 1945 (Note: Maurer gives station as Augsburg, Germany. Maurer, Combat Squadrons, p. 559. Gablingen Airfield is in Augsburg.)
- Landsberg Airfield (R-78), Germany, c. 13 September 1945
- Haunstetten, Germany, 12 July 1945
- Clastres, France (A-71), c. 1 October 1945 – December 1945
- Camp Myles Standish, Massachusetts, 13 December 1945 – 14 December 1945
- Tinker Air Force Base, Oklahoma, 27 June 1949 – 17 March 1951 (deployed at Eglin Air Force Base Auxiliary Field No. 2, Florida, 11–25 June 1950)
- Bunker Hill Air Force Base, Indiana, 8 August 1955 – 1 September 1957
- Mather Air Force Base, California, 1 April 1973 – 31 May 1993
- Kelly Air Force Base (later Kelly Field Annex, Lackland Air Force Base; Joint Base San Antonio – Lackland), Texas, 1 August 2000 – present

=== Aircraft ===
- Martin B-26 Marauder 1942–1945
- Douglas B-26 Invader, 1949–1951
- North American T-6 Texan, by 1949–1951
- Beechcraft T-7 Navigator, 1950–1951
- Beechcraft T-11 Kansan, by 1949–1951
- North American F-86 Sabre 1955–1957
- North American F-100 Super Sabre 1956–1957
- Convair T-29 Flying Classroom 1973–1975
- Boeing T-43 Bobcat 1975–1993

=== Awards and campaigns ===
Award streamer	Award	Dates	Notes
	Distinguished Unit Citation	24–27 December 1944	Belgium and Germany, 453d Bombardment Squadron
	Air Force Outstanding Unit Award	1 April – 31 December 1973	453d Flying Training Squadron
	Air Force Outstanding Unit Award	1 January 1976 – 28 February 1977	453d Flying Training Squadron
	Air Force Outstanding Unit Award	1 January 1978 – 30 April 1979	453d Flying Training Squadron
	Air Force Outstanding Unit Award	1 January 1980 – 30 April 1981	453d Flying Training Squadron
	Air Force Outstanding Unit Award	1 April 1986 – 31 March 1988	453d Flying Training Squadron
	Air Force Outstanding Unit Award	1 August 2000 – 31 May 2002	453d Electronic Warfare Squadron
	Air Force Outstanding Unit Award	1 June 2003 – 31 May 2004	453d Electronic Warfare Squadron
	Air Force Outstanding Unit Award	1 June 2008 – 31 May 2009	453d Electronic Warfare Squadron
	Air Force Outstanding Unit Award	1 June 2018 – 31 May 2020	453d Electronic Warfare Squadron
	Air Force Organizational Excellence Award	1 June 2003 – 31 May 2004	453d Electronic Warfare Squadron

Campaign Streamer	Campaign	Dates	Notes
	Air Offensive, Europe	12 May 1943 – 5 June 1944	453d Bombardment Squadron
	Air Combat, EAME Theater	14 May 1943 – 11 May 1945	453d Bombardment Squadron
	Normandy	6 June 1944 – 24 July 1944	453d Bombardment Squadron
	Northern France	25 July 1944 – 14 September 1944	453d Bombardment Squadron
	Rhineland	15 September 1944 – 21 March 1945	453d Bombardment Squadron
	Ardennes-Alsace	16 December 1944 – 25 January 1945	453d Bombardment Squadron
	Central Europe	22 March 1944 – 21 May 1945	453d Bombardment Squadron
