= R77 =

R77 may refer to:

- R-77, a Russian air-to-air missile
- R-77 Gablingen, a former military airfield in Germany
- HMS Majestic (R77), an aircraft carrier laid down for the Royal Navy
- Small nucleolar RNA Z102/R77
