= VIII Air Support Command =

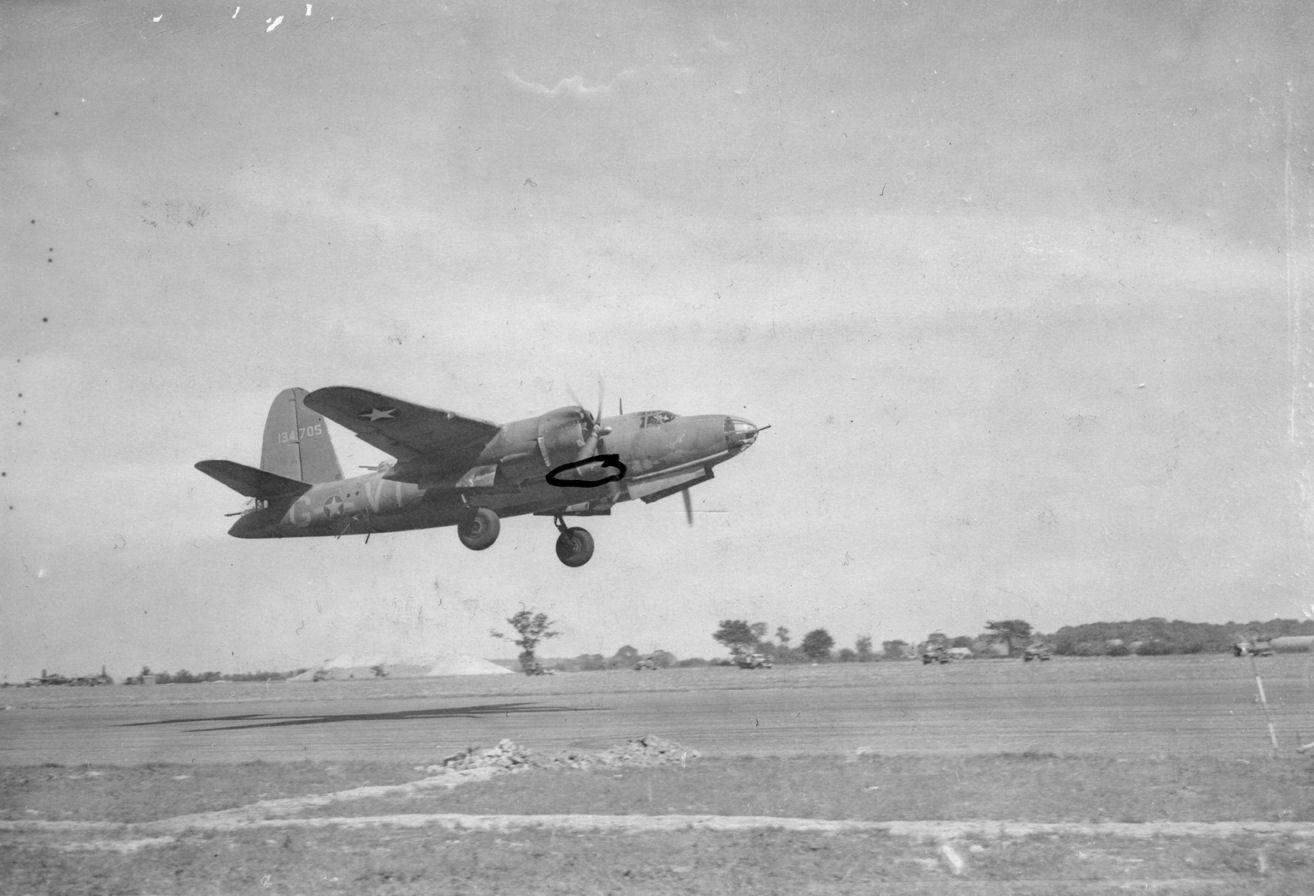
- VIII Air Support Command Martin B-26 Marauder taking off (Note: Airplane is Martin B-26C-5-MO Marauder, serial 41-34705 of the 453d Bombardment Squadron taking off from RAF Earls Colne, 18 August 1943.)
- Active: 1942–1943
- Country: United States
- Branch: United States Air Force
- Role: Command of medium bomber units
- Decorations: European Theater of Operations

The VIII Air Support Command is a disbanded United States Army Air Forces unit. It was assigned to Eighth Air Force throughout its existence, and it was last stationed at Sunninghill Park, England, where it was disbanded on 1 December 1943.

VIII Air Support Command engaged in training, with one reconnaissance and one troop carrier group assigned, until July 1943. Afterward, carried out medium bombardment operations against the enemy on the Continent until October 1943 when all components and personnel were withdrawn from the command, with most transferred to Ninth Air Force, which transferred to England from Africa to become the primary tactical command for the invasion of Europe. The command was disbanded little more than a month later.

== History ==
The 8th Ground Air Support Command was organized on 28 April 1942 at Bolling Field, Washington, D.C. commanded by Col. Robert C. Candee and assigned to 8th Air Force. The command drew most of its cadre from 5th Air Support Command. Col. Candee was promoted to Brigadier General. The command moved to Savannah, Georgia the following month, joining its parent, 8th Air Force. the command headquarters, but not its assigned units, for England in July, but did not open its headquarters at RAF Membury in Berkshire until 17 August.

The mission of VIII Ground Air Support Command was initially training reconnaissance and troop transport units. In February 1943, the command's mission was expanded to carrying out medium bombardment operations against the enemy on the Continent.

In February 1941, the first Martin B-26 Marauder medium bombers were accepted by the Army Air Forces. It was to be in the European theater where the Marauder was to achieve its greatest success. In the United Kingdom, the Marauder formed the medium bomber forces of the VIII Air Support Command. The first B-26s arrived in the United Kingdom in February 1943. They were to be used in low-level missions against German military targets on the Continent.

On 16 October 1943, the B-26 Marauder units were reassigned to IX Bomber Command, leaving the command without operational units. Its command staff was reassigned to other units, and the command was disbanded on 1 December 1943.

== Lineage ==
- Constituted as 8th Ground Air Support Command on 24 April 1942 (Note: Maurer indicates that the unit was constituted as the "VIII" Ground Air Support Command. However, the unit was constituted and activated with an arabic number in its name. The use of roman numerals to designate Army Air Forces combat commands did not begin until September 1942. "Air Force Historical Research Agency Organizational Reconds: Types of USAF Organizations". Air Force History Index. 9 January 2008.)

Activated on 28 April 1942
Redesignated VIII Air Support Command c. 18 September 1942
Disbanded on 1 December 1943

=== Assignments ===
United States Air Forces in Europe, 28 April 1942 – 1 December 1943

=== Components ===
Wings

- 3d Bombardment Wing, c. 12 June 1943 – 16 October 1943
- 44th Bombardment Wing, c. 28 September 1943 – c. November 1943

Groups

- 68th Observation Group: attached c. 18–22 June 1942; assigned 23 June – c. 4 [July] 1942
- 386th Bombardment Group, 15 June – 16 October 1943

(Note: Freeman indicates that the 60th Troop Carrier Group, then the 51st Troop Carrier Wing was assigned to the command. Freeman, p. 242. However, the Air Force Historical Research Agency history of the wing indicates the wing was assigned directly to Eighth Air Force. Robertson, Patsy (2 January 2008). "Factsheet 551 Electronic Systems Wing (AFMC)". Air Force Historical Research Agency.. But compare Rumley, Christopher M. (25 January 2021). "Factsheet United States Air Forces in Europe (USAF)". Air Force Historical Research Agency. (51st Wing not listed among components of Eighth Air Force in 1942) and Maurer, Combat Units, pp. 445-446 (one troop carrier group assigned while in the United States).)

Squadrons

- 6th Communications Squadron, Air Support: 10 June – c. 2 August 1942

=== Stations ===
- Bolling Field, District of Columbia, 28 April 1942
- Savannah, Georgia, 29 May-c. 20 July 1942
- Bushey Park (AAF-586), England, July 1942
- RAF Membury (AAF-466), England, 21 August 1942
- Sunninghill Park (AAF-472), England, 19 October 1942 – 1 December 1943
