= Small nucleolar RNA Z102/R77 =

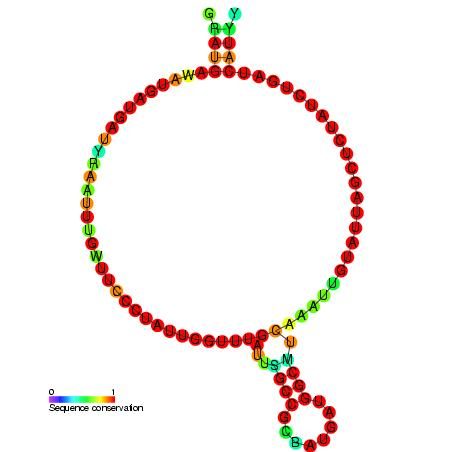
- Predicted secondary structure and sequence conservation of snoZ102_R77

Identifiers
- Symbol: snoZ102_R77
- Rfam: RF00359

Other data
- RNA type: Gene; snRNA; snoRNA; CD-box
- Domain: Eukaryota
- GO: GO:0006396 GO:0005730
- SO: SO:0000593
- PDB structures: PDBe

In molecular biology, Small nucleolar RNA RZ102/R77 refers to a group of related non-coding RNA (ncRNA) molecules which function in the biogenesis of other small nuclear RNAs (snRNAs). These small nucleolar RNAs (snoRNAs) are modifying RNAs and usually located in the nucleolus of the eukaryotic cell which is a major site of snRNA biogenesis.

These two snoRNAs R77 and Z102 were identified in the plant Arabidopsis thaliana and rice Oryza sativa respectively. These related snoRNAs are predicted to belong to the C/D box class of snoRNAs which contain the conserved sequence motifs known as the C box (UGAUGA) and the D box (CUGA). Most of the members of the box C/D family function in directing site-specific 2'-O-methylation of substrate RNAs.

Z102 and R77 and are members of the C/D class of snoRNA which contain the C (UGAUGA) and D (CUGA) box motifs. Most of the members of the box C/D family function in directing site-specific 2'-O-methylation of substrate RNAs.
