= Earls Colne Airfield =

General aviation aerodrome

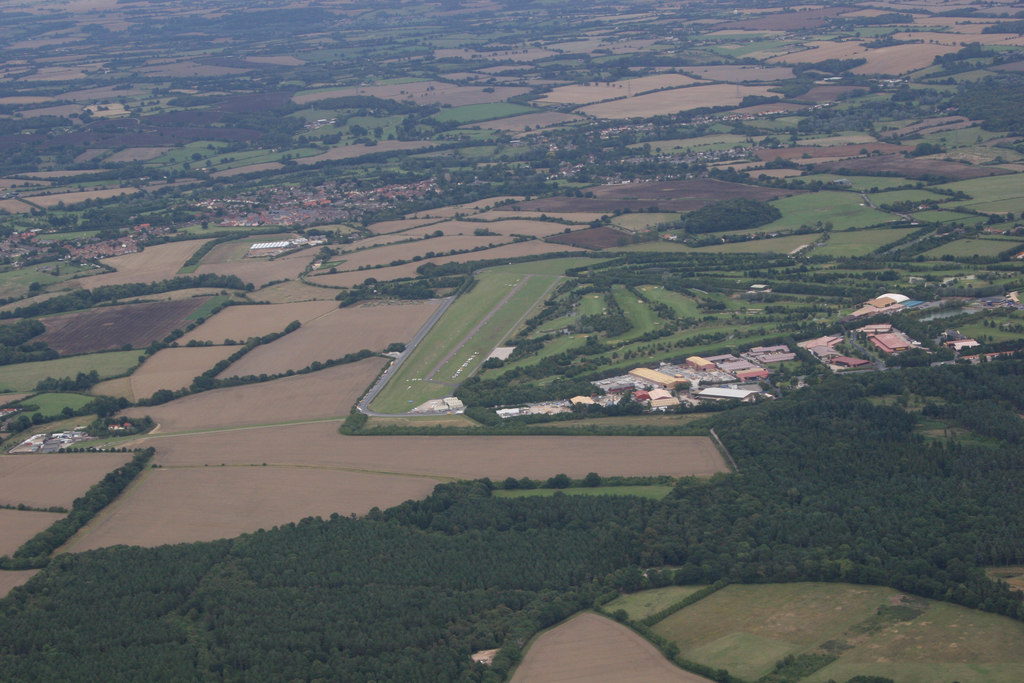
- The airfield in 2010
- IATA: none; ICAO: EGSR

Summary
- Location: Earls Colne, Essex, England
- Elevation AMSL: 222 ft (68 m)
- Coordinates: 51°54′52″N 000°40′57″E

Map
- Shown within Essex

Runways
Direction	Length		Surface
Direction	ft	m	Surface
06/24		939	Grass
06/24		778	Asphalt

Helipads
Number	Length		Surface
Number	ft	m	Surface
01			Asphalt

Earls Colne Airfield (ICAO: EGSR) is a general aviation aerodrome located south-east of the village of Earls Colne, Essex, England. It is currently home to the Essex and Herts Air Ambulance.

The site was previously RAF Earls Colne, a Royal Air Force station which was primarily used by the United States Army Air Forces.

== History ==
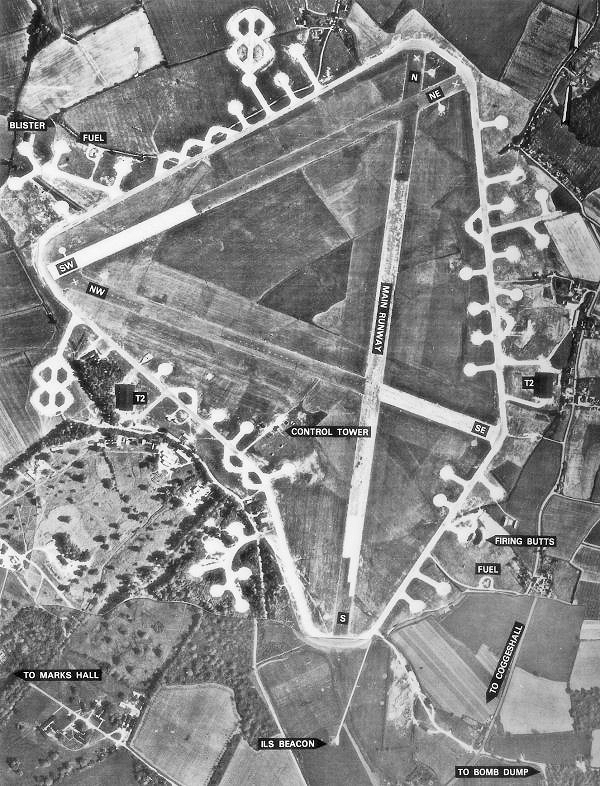
The airfield in 1946

The following units were here at some point:

- No. 38 Group Communication Flight RAF (October 1944 - May 1946)
- No. 296 Squadron RAF between 29 September 1944 and 23 January 1946 using Armstrong Whitworth Albemarle I, V, & VI and the Handley Page Halifax V, III & A.7
- No. 297 Squadron RAF between 30 September 1944 and 1 April 1946 using Albemarle I, II, V & VI and the Halifax V, III & A.7
- 94th Bombardment Group
- 323d Bombardment Group
- 331st Bombardment Squadron
- 332nd Bombardment Squadron
- 333rd Bombardment Squadron
- 410th Bombardment Squadron
- 453rd Bombardment Squadron
- 454th Bombardment Squadron
- 455th Bombardment Squadron
- 456th Bombardment Squadron

== Post-war ==
The following companies were located there at some point:

- Anglian Flight Centres
- Bulldog Aviation
- Essex Air Ambulance
- Essex Flying School
- Herts Air Ambulance

== See also ==
- List of former Royal Air Force stations
