= Valenciennes-Denain Airport =

Valenciennes-Denain Airport (Advanced Landing Ground A-83/B-74)
- IATA: none; ICAO: LFAV

Summary
- Location: Valenciennes, France
- Elevation AMSL: 177 ft / 54 m
- Coordinates: 50°19′32″N 003°27′40″E

Map
- Location of Valenciennes-Denain Airport

Runways
Direction	Length		Surface
Direction	ft	m	Surface
11/29	5,610	1,710	Asphalt

Valenciennes-Denain Airport (ICAO: LFAV) is a regional airport in France, located southwest of Valenciennes (Departement du Nord, Nord-Pas-de-Calais); 115 miles (185 km) north-northeast of Paris

It supports general aviation with no commercial airline service scheduled.

== History ==
Denain Airport began as a pre-World War II airport in France, most likely with a grass runway and several support buildings and a hangar serving the nearby city of Prouvy and surrounding region.

=== German use during World War II ===
It was seized by the Germans in late May 1940 during the early part of the Battle of France. In July 1940, the Luftwaffe stationed Erprobungsgruppe 210, a Messerschmitt Bf 110C/D heavy fighter/bomber unit at the airport, taking part in the Battle of Britain that summer. Later the unit switched to attacks on British shipping. In February 1941, the unit was re-equipped with Messerschmitt Bf 109 Es, flying bomber escort missions. Jagdgeschwader 51, another Bf 109E unit briefly used the airport in October 1940.

In addition, a reconnaissance unit, Aufklärungsgruppe 12 was assigned to Denain in October 1940 with Henschel Hs 126 twin-seat light observation planes. The unit stayed until May 1941.

It appears that the Luftwaffe moved out of Denain in 1941 and the airfield was left unused. In 1943, the Germans laid a 1600m all-weather concrete runway at the airport, aligned northeast–southwest (06/24). A taxiway and a significant number of aircraft dispersal pads, maintenance shops, hangars and other support facilities were also built. Presumably this was due to the fortification of the Pas-de-Calais, being believed by the Germans that when the Americans and British tried to land in France to open a Second Front, the airfield would have a key role in the defense of France.

After the construction of a military airfield at Denain, the airfield was reactivated by the Luftwaffe, stationing Jagdgeschwader 3, a day fighter-interceptor unit assigned to the "Defense of the Reich" campaign against the American Eighth Air Force heavy bombers attacking targets in Occupied Europe and Germany.

In response to the interceptor attacks, Denain was attacked by USAAF Ninth Air Force Martin B-26 Marauder medium bombers and Republic P-47 Thunderbolts mostly with 500-pound General-Purpose bombs; unguided rockets and .50 caliber machine gun sweeps when Eighth Air Force heavy bombers (Boeing B-17 Fortresses, Consolidated B-24 Liberators) were within interception range of the Luftwaffe aircraft assigned to the base. The attacks were timed to have the maximum effect possible to keep the interceptors pinned down on the ground and be unable to attack the heavy bombers. Also the North American P-51 Mustang fighter-escort groups of Eighth Air Force would drop down on their return to England and attack the base with a fighter sweep and attack any target of opportunity to be found at the airfield.

=== American use ===
Denain Airport was cleared of German forces by Allied ground forces about 11 September 1944 during the Northern France Campaign. Almost immediately, the United States Army Air Forces IX Engineering Command 862d Engineer Aviation Battalion cleared the airport of mines and destroyed Luftwaffe aircraft. Pierced steel planking was laid down on the bomb-damaged runway in order to make it serviceable and available for operational use. The airport immediately became a combat supply and casualty evacuation airfield, designated as Advanced Landing Ground "A-83" about 14 September, also being known as "Denain/Prouvy Airfield".

Douglas C-47 Skytrain transports moved in and out of the American-controlled airfield almost immediately after the runway was repaired, supplying the front line forces with the necessary materiel to support their advance. A small cadre of personnel was assigned to the field, still largely in ruins due to the Martin B-26 Marauder and fighter strafing/bombing runs on the field. In January 1945, the 833d Engineer Aviation Battalion moved back to Denain and improved the facilities enough to support combat units. The Ninth Air Force 323d Bombardment Group, moved in with B-26 Marauder medium bombers in February, remaining until 15 May 1945.

=== Royal Air Force use ===
It is known that Denain was used by the Royal Air Force, as it was assigned ALG "B-74". The RAF's use of the base has not been determined.

After being used for a brief time as a storage depot for excess aircraft after the war ended by Air Technical Service Command, the Americans turned the airfield back over to French authorities on 25 June 1945.

=== Postwar and modern use ===
In French control after the war, the airport sat abandoned for several years. There was much unexploded ordnance at the site which needed to be removed, as well as the wreckage of German and American aircraft. Many of the buildings at the base were destroyed by the war, and although some had been repaired by the American combat engineers, most were in ruins. It was uneconomical to repair the prewar airport, and as a result the facility was demolished, with the French Army sending in unexploded ordnance teams to remove the dangerous munitions.

Reconstruction of the airport included an entirely new asphalt runway, aligned 11/29, along with appropriate taxiways, ramp space and new infrastructure buildings on the north-west side of the airfield. Today the airport is a modern, well-equipped facility.

The wartime air base is still evident with the 5500-foot concrete NE/SW runway remaining, complete with patched bomb craters and expansion joints allowing grass to grow between the concrete pads. The taxiway is the only wartime structures of the base that still exists, mostly as a single lane concrete access road.

Very few constructions are still visible today (2021), but the restaurant l'Escale is one of the buildings built to store bombers on the airport.

== See also ==
- Advanced Landing Ground
- List of airports in France
