= Horham =

Village in Suffolk, England

Coordinates: 52.305°N 1.249°E

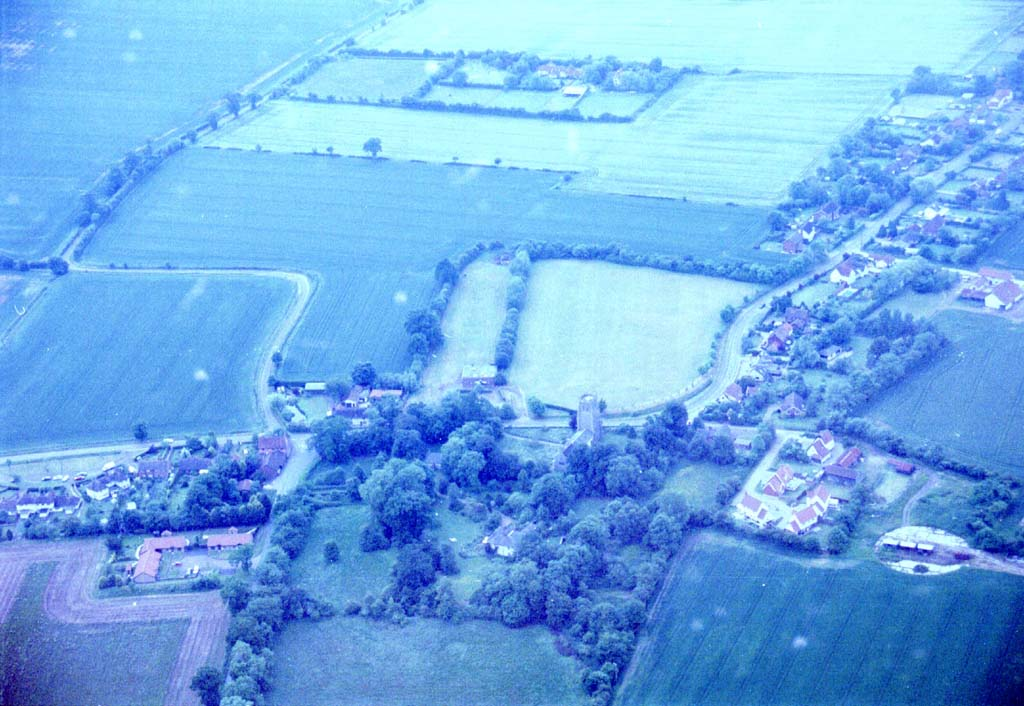
- Village of Horham, Suffolk

- Location within Suffolk
- Area: 5.89 km^{2} (2.27 sq mi)
- Population: 305 (2011 Census)
  - Density: 52/km^{2} (130/sq mi)
- OS grid reference: TM2172
- District: Mid Suffolk
- Shire county: Suffolk
- Region: East
- Country: England
- Sovereign state: United Kingdom
- Post town: EYE
- Postcode district: IP21
- Police: Suffolk
- Fire: Suffolk
- Ambulance: East of England
- UK Parliament: Central Suffolk and North Ipswich

Horham (pronounced 'Horrum') is a village in the county of Suffolk, in the East Anglia region of eastern England, United Kingdom. Horham is located approximately halfway between Norwich and Ipswich, and also approximately halfway between Eye and Stradbroke on the B1117 road.

== History ==
The village is old; some say it was a Viking settlement. There are some houses that are known to have been built in the 15th century. The old Dragon Inn - now known as Dragon House - is believed to date back to about 1525. From the 11th century until the late 18th century, it is documented as one of the parishes within Hoxne Hundred. The village contains a church, St. Mary of Horham, of Norman origin, but much improved in the years either side of 1500.

The composer Benjamin Britten used a cottage in Horham as a composing retreat from 1970 until his death in 1976.

=== Railways ===
The Mid-Suffolk Light Railway was built at the turn of the last century to serve the villages, and agriculture, of Mid Suffolk. The terminus of the MSLR, or ‘Middy’ as it was affectionately called, was at Haughley Junction, where the station was enlarged in 1903 to cope with this additional role. The MSLR was a standard gauge railway built to take light traffic from Haughley to Mendlesham, Brockford, Kenton, Aspall, Horham and Laxfield. The railway opened predominantly in 1904 and was extended for freight only to Cratfield in 1906. The original idea was to push the line across to Southwold, providing a link from the Midlands through to the North Sea at Southwold. It was also planned to join with the East Suffolk Railway at Westerfield for Ipswich by building a railway through Debenham and Otley. A short section to Debenham was built but never opened.

Originally there were cattle docks provided at every station except Haughley, but these also fell into disuse as agriculture turned from cattle to corn. In World War I, part of the link to Kenton and Debenham, which had been started, was lifted because the materials were more urgently needed elsewhere and this effectively ended any hopes of completing the original scheme. The line was never to be a profitable enterprise and when, along with the Great Eastern Railway, it was swallowed up by the London and North Eastern Railway (LNER) in 1924, it remained virtually independent within the new grouping, simply because the LNER did not want to take it on. The only economy that they did eventually insist on was the closure of the MSLR Haughley East Station and the centralisation of the operation on the old GER station in November 1939. The original MLSR station was flattened.

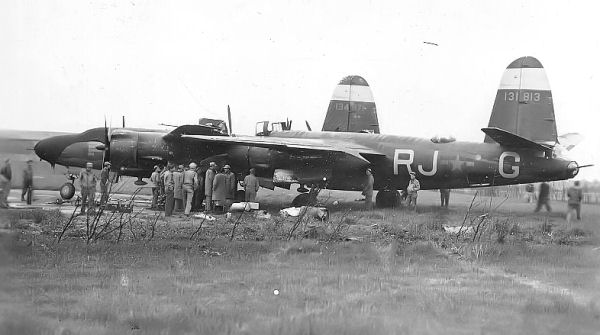
USAAF Martin B-26 Marauders of 323rd Bomb Group, RAF Horham, 1943

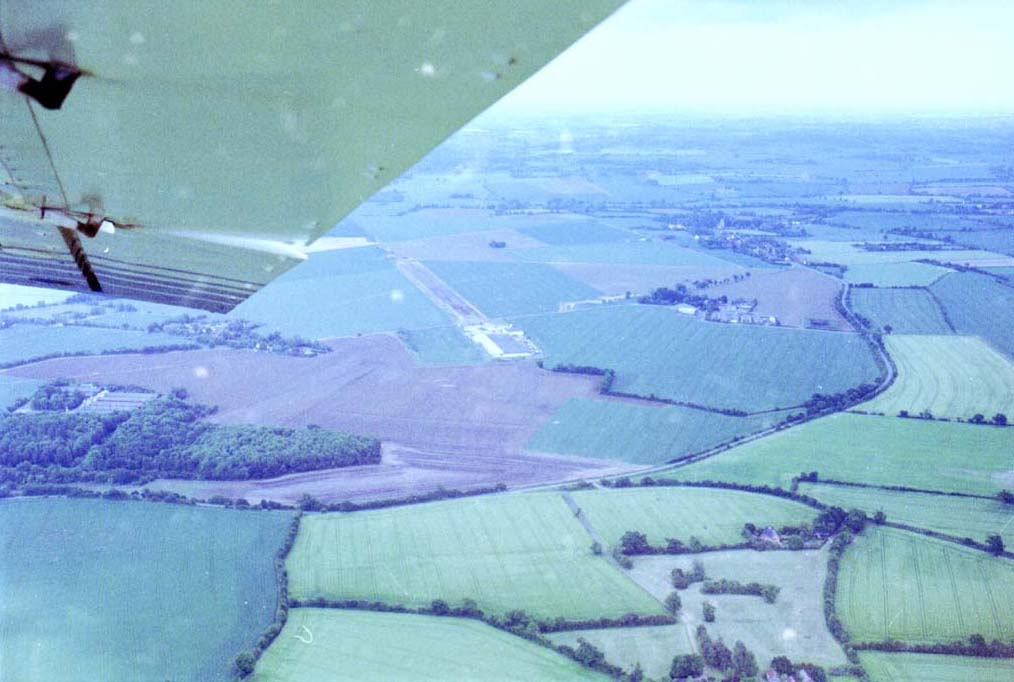
World War II airfield in centre of picture, village of Horham to the right

=== Wartime ===
Just to the north of the village are the remains of a World War II airfield, RAF Horham (Station 119), used by the U.S. Eighth Air Force, 323d Bomb Group flying the Martin B-26 Marauder, and later by the 95th Bomb Group flying the Boeing B-17 Flying Fortress. A portion of the runway is still visible. The Red Feather Club has been restored and a World War II museum is in the same building. There is also another museum which was formerly the airfield's hospital.

The village still maintains close bonds with veterans and families of the 95th Bomb Group community in the United States. The village has paid host to these families in numerous reunions, most notably in 1981, 1989, 1992, 2005 and 2009. June 2013 saw the village celebrate the 70th anniversary of the 95th Bomb Group's arrival.

== Bibliography ==
- Maurer, Maurer, ed. (1982) [1969]. Combat Squadrons of the Air Force, World War II (PDF) (reprint ed.). Washington, DC: Office of Air Force History. ISBN 0-405-12194-6. LCCN 70605402. OCLC 72556.
