= Chartres – Champhol Aerodrome =

Airport in Centre-Val de Loire, France

Chartres - Champhol Aerodrome Aérodrome de Chartres - Champhol
- IATA: none; ICAO: LFOR

Summary
- Airport type: Public
- Operator: Chartres Métropole
- Serves: Chartres / Champhol, France
- Elevation AMSL: 509 ft (155 m)
- Coordinates: 48°27′32″N 001°31′26″E

Maps
- Location of Centre region in France

- Location of airport in Centre region

Runways
Direction	Length		Surface
Direction	m	ft	Surface
10/28	840	2,756	Asphalt
10L/28R	900	2,953	Grass
- Sources: French AIP, UAF

Chartres – Champhol Aerodrome (French: Aérodrome de Chartres - Champhol) (ICAO: LFOR) is an airport serving Chartres and Champhol, in the Eure-et-Loir department in north-central France. The airport is located 2.5 km (1.3 NM) east-northeast of Chartres and it is southeast of Champhol. It supports general aviation with no commercial airline service scheduled.

== History ==
The facility was a military field, prior to 1870, dedicated to cavalry.

=== Pilots' school during World War I ===
The first plane designed by engineer Clément Ader was tested there, yet failed to take off on October 9, 1890. Chartres' airfield started in 1909.

From March 1915 to the end of World War I, an important military training center for pilots was set up; it was on the top of military flying schools in France, and many famous pilots were trained in Chartres.

At this time, the airfield was opened to civil aircraft as well as military.

In 1923, the "22^{e} Régiment Aérien de bombardement de nuit" (22nd Night Bombardment Squadron) was located in Chartres, with Amiot 143 bombers and, later, the Bloch 131.

=== From WW I to WW II: Bomber and fighter squadrons ===
An important bombing squadron, the "22e Régiment Aérien de Bombardement de Nuit" (Night Bombing Squadron), settled in Chartres, in 1923.

The French Air Force was born on 1 April 1933.

The 6e Escadre de Chasse (6th Fighting Squadron) landed in Chartres in 1936.

It was reinforced by the Armée de l'Air as a military airfield after the Invasion of Poland in September 1939. The French Air Force based Morane-Saulnier MS-230 fighters at the airfield for the defense of the Chartres region. Bloch 151s were also assigned, with Czechoslovak pilots being assigned to the airfield.

=== World War II ===
==== Training for fighter pilots ====
From 1939 to May, 1940 a training unit for fighter pilots worked in Chartres: the "Centre d'Instruction de la Chasse" (Fighting Training Centre). Many of them fought against German planes.

The airfield was first attacked by the German Luftwaffe on 3 June 1940 by a formation of 15 twin engine Dornier Do 17 light bombers. It was surrendered along with the rest of the French Air Force bases in France at the Second Armistice at Compiègne on 22 June and was seized by the occupying German Army.

==== German use ====
After the Battle of France, Chartres was used as a Luftwaffe military airfield during the occupation. Known units assigned (all from Luftlotte 3, Fliegerkorps IV):

- Kampfgeschwader 100 (KG 100) 17 June-19 July 1941; 29 November 1941 – 21 April 1942 Heinkel He 111H (Fuselage Code 6N+)
- Lehr & Erprobungskommando 100 (LEKG 100) January–June 1942 Heinkel He 111H
- Kampfgeschwader 53 (KG 53) 15 July-16 August 1942 Heinkel He 111H (Fuselage Code A1+)
- Kampfgeschwader 66 (KG 66) April–June 1943 Dornier Do 217, Junkers Ju 88A (Fuselage Code Z6+)
- Nahaufklärungsgruppe 13 (NKG 13) 7 June–August 1944 Junkers Ju 88
- Kampfgeschwader 55 (KG 55) 27 July 1943 – 18 June 1944 Focke-Wulf Fw 190 (Fuselage Code G1+)

KG 100, KG 53, KG 66 were all night bombardment units that engaged in operations over England; LEKG 100 was a Luftwaffe Commando unit capable of dropping parachutists; KG 55 was a day interceptor unit against Eighth Air Force daylight bombing raids; NKG 13 was a night interceptor unit against Royal Air Force night bombing attacks.

The Chartres area was heavily attacked on several missions by United States Army Air Force Eighth Air Force bombers in 1943 and 1944 and the airport was singularly attacked on 15 September 1943 by 22 B-24 Liberators of the 44th Bombardment Group. Additional attacks on the airfield were made on 2 March and 25 March 1944 by B-17 Flying Fortresses of the 94th Bombardment Group and 388th Bombardment Group of the 4th Bombardment Wing.

Just prior to the D-Day landings in Normandy, additional attacks were made on the airfield by Martin B-26 Marauder medium bombers of the IX Bomber Command 322d Bombardment Group during May 1944. It was attacked again during June and July after the landings by the 397th and 416th Bombardment Groups.

==== American use ====
It was liberated by Allied ground forces about 21 August 1944 during the Northern France Campaign. Almost immediately, the USAAF IX Engineer Command 832nd and 833rd Engineer Aviation Battalions began clearing the airport of mines and destroyed Luftwaffe aircraft, and repairing operational facilities for use by American aircraft. Subsequently, Chartres Airport became a USAAF Ninth Air Force combat airfield, designated as "A-40" about 26 August, only a week after its capture from German forces.

Once declared operationally ready, the airfield had a concrete runway 5500' long aligned 08/26, with much Pierced Steel Planking used to repair the damage caused by the frequent Allied bombing. Most hangars and support buildings were destroyed and subsequently, tents had to be used for billeting and also for support facilities along with a drinkable water supply and minimal electrical grid established for communications and station lighting.

Under American control, Chartres initially became the home of the 368th Fighter Group, which flew Republic P-47 Thunderbolts from the field starting on 23 August, remaining until 11 September. They were replaced by the Martin B-26 Marauder-equipped 323d Bombardment Group on 21 September, flying combat missions until 13 October 1944.

The combat units moved out at the end of October 1944, and until the end of the war, Chartres became a resupply and combat casualty evacuation airfield, and performing other support roles for the Allies. It was returned to French civil control in June 1945.

=== French Air Force use ===
World War II had almost totally destroyed Champhol Airport. Much unexploded and excess wartime ordnance needed to be removed and the entire infrastructure was in ruins. The previous airfield of the "22^{e} Régiment de Bombardement Aérien" was reconstructed as Chartres Air Base (BA 122) (Base Aérienne 122 Chartres-Champhol) and used by the French Air Force.

This base was very active, mainly with flying squadrons specialised in tactical transport, such as the 61e Escadre de Transport. Those planes were involved in battles of the French wars in Indochine (Vietnam) and Algeria. In 1953, planes and flying squadrons were based on the French Air Force base of Orléans, due to the danger of flights with big planes close to the famous cathedral of Chartres.

It remained an important Air Force base after 1953, and included technical units, a military training center (CIMCA 41.122) and a broadcasting station.

The French Air Force closed the military air base in 1997.

== Current ==
The field was replaced by a totally new civilian facility which is much smaller than the prewar airport. It has an asphalt main runway and a secondary turf runway for small aircraft and glider use. The runway and ground support buildings are on the south side of the former airport and wartime runway. In addition, an industrial park was built on part of the former airport

What appear to be hangars are on the north side of the airport, about 200m north of the runway, and unconnected with the current airport, were probably part of the former military airfield. Also it appears that the north side of the airport, the location of the prewar airport and wartime airfield, remains under French military control, as aerial photography and satellite images of the area are either intentionally blurred or blanked for undetermined reasons. What appears to be remains of the old main runway, part of the 26 end of the runway, and old taxiways and possibly dispersal hardstands are in the blurred area.

== Facilities ==
The airport resides at an elevation of 509 feet (155 m) above mean sea level. It has one paved runway designated 10/28 which measures 840 by 25 metres (2,756 ft × 82 ft). It also has a parallel unpaved runway with a grass surface measuring 900 by 100 metres (2,953 ft × 328 ft).

== See also ==
- Advanced Landing Ground
- Base Aérienne 122 Chartres-Champhol within Wikipedia in French
