= Lessay Airport =

Lessay Airport Advanced Landing Ground (ALG) A-20
- IATA: none; ICAO: LFOM

Summary
- Airport type: Public
- Location: Lessay, France
- Coordinates: 49°12′08″N 001°30′29″W

Map
- Location of Lessay Airport

Runways
Direction	Length		Surface
Direction	ft	m	Surface
06/24	4,160	1,268	Grass

Lessay Airport (ICAO: LFOM) is a regional airport in Lessay, Normandy, France. It supports general aviation with no scheduled commercial airline services.

== History ==
The airport was built in August 1944 as a United States Army Air Force Ninth Air Force Advanced Landing Ground. It was constructed by the IX Engineering Command, 830th Engineer Aviation Battalion. The original construction was of Pierced Steel Planking for two intersecting runways, a main of 6000' x 120' (06/24) and a secondary of 5000' x 120' (12/30). In addition, tents were used for billeting and also for support facilities; an access road was built to the existing road infrastructure; a dump for supplies, ammunition, and gasoline drums, along with a drinkable water and minimal electrical grid for communications and station lighting.

When completed it was known as ALG "A-20". Built for bomber use with all-weather facilities, it was the home of the 323d Bombardment Group which moved in from RAF Beaulieu, England on 26 August, remaining until 21 September 1944. The 323d flew Martin B-26 Marauders. The bombers flew support missions during the Allied invasion of Normandy, dropping bombs on German gun emplacements, anti-aircraft artillery and concentrations of troops. They also attacked bridges and German-controlled airfields in occupied areas. After the bombers moved east to Chartres in Central France, the airfield was closed and turned over to local French authorities.

After the war, it was developed into the current airport. The runways have had their metal runways removed and are now turf. The main is still in use, however the secondary is very evident in aerial photography.

== See also ==
- Advanced Landing Ground
