= Gablingen Kaserne =

Gablingen Kaserne Gablingen Airfield (R-77)

Site information
- Type: Military Garrison (Closed)

Location
- Coordinates: 48°27′05″N 010°51′37″E

Site history
- Built: 1910
- Built by: Luftstreitkräfte (Imperial German Air Force)
- In use: 1910-1918 (Luftstreitkräfte); 1935-1945 (Luftwaffe); Apr 1945-April 1946 (USAAF); August 1946-1998 (United States Army)

Location of Gablingen Kaserne, Germany

Gablingen Kaserne is a former military facility in Gablingen near Augsburg, Germany, which was closed in 1998. Its primary use was signals intelligence collection during the Cold War.

== History ==
Part of Gablingen Kaserne was constructed prior to World War I for use by the Royal Bavarian Air Force. The airfield was closed in 1918 and flight activities were prohibited in 1919 as a result of the Treaty of Versailles.

Reopened in 1936 as a Luftwaffe airfield, Gablingen was home to three Luftwaffe flying schools: Flugzeugführerschule A5, Nachtjadgschule 1, and Flugzeugführerschule C7. In addition, the entire facility was enlarged as one of the two German Air Bases in the Augsburg area, the other one being Lechfeld Airbase.

One of the most interesting aspects of the history of Gablingen is the complex tunnel system beneath the old airdrome, which may have been used to conceal the existence of a Messerschmitt test facility located there prior to, and during, the Second World War. The Messerschmitt plant used laborers from the Dachau concentration camp. Messerschmitt's rocket-powered Messerschmitt Me 163 were tested at this facility as early as 1941.

American forces seized the base almost unopposed on 1 May 1945 and the facility was quickly secured. IX Engineer Command engineers from the 833rd Aviation Engineer Battalion moved into the facility and designated the base as Advanced Landing Ground "R-77", although no combat unit moved to the airfield until 15 May, after the German Capitulation to perform occupation duty. Renamed as Army Airfield Station Gablingen, several USAAF groups were assigned to the airfield until 1 July 1946, when the facility was turned over to the United States Army.

== U.S. Army use ==
Gablingen was used by the U.S. Army as a barracks, housing various elements of the different divisions stationed in the Augsburg area, as well as USASA Field Station Augsburg, a signals intelligence facility. Around 1970, the 3rd Brigade, 1st Infantry Division moved to Goeppingen.

The AN/FLR-9 circular "Wullenweber" antenna array, was built at many locations during the cold war for HF/DF direction finding of high priority targets. The worldwide network, known collectively as "Iron Horse", could quickly and accurately locate an HF communications from almost anywhere on the planet. Today, advances in technology have made the AN/FLR-9 obsolete.

The kaserne was closed in 1998.
