= 479th Tactical Training Wing =

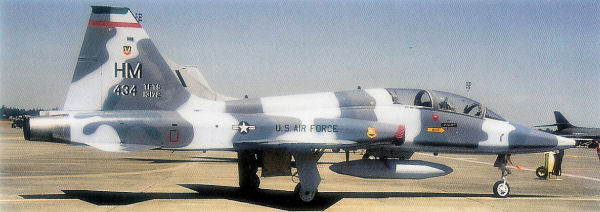
- Wing AT-38B Talon (Note: Aircraft is Northrop AT-38B Talon, serial 64-13172 of the 434th Tactical Fighter Training Squadron.)
- Active: 1952–1971; 1977–1991
- Country: United States
- Branch: United States Air Force
- Role: Fighter training

Insignia
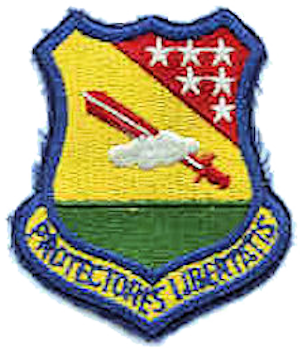
- Patch with the 479th Tactical Training Wing emblem (Note: Approved 10 September 1954.)
- Tail code: HM

The 479th Tactical Training Wing is an inactive United States Air Force unit. Its last assignment was with Tactical Training, Holloman, stationed at Holloman Air Force Base, New Mexico. It was inactivated on 26 July 1991.

Upon inactivation, all personnel, equipment and aircraft were transferred to the 479th Fighter Group.

== History ==
for associated history, see 479th Flying Training Group

On 1 December 1952 the unit was established as the 479th Fighter-Bomber Wing at George Air Force Base, California, replacing the Federalized Missouri Air National Guard's 131st Fighter-Bomber Wing, which had been brought to active duty during the Korean War.

The 479th inherited the North American F-51D Mustangs of the 131st as well as becoming the host wing of George for almost the next 20 years. Its operational squadrons were the 434th, 435th, 436th, and the wing squadrons participated in numerous exercises, augmented air defenses of the West Coast, and deployed overseas to support both USAFE during periods of tension in Western Europe; to Florida during the Cuban Missile Crisis and to Pacific Air Forces during the Vietnam War.

=== F-100 Super Sabre era ===
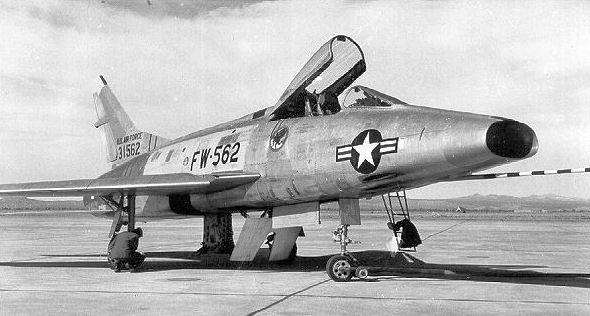
F-100A-10-NA, AF Ser. No. 53-1562, of the 434th Fighter-Day Squadron.

Initially, the new wing maintained tactical proficiency with the World War II–era F-51Ds inherited from the Air National Guard, then in February 1953 upgrading to the North American F-86H Sabre jet aircraft. The wing was chosen to be the first USAF wing to be equipped with the North American F-100A Super Sabre, receiving its first aircraft in November 1953. The 479th became operationally ready with the F-100A on 29 September 1954.

However, the F-100A had been rushed into service with unseemly haste, often over the objections of Air Force flight crews who found the Super Sabre had serious problems that were not being adequately addressed. Disaster struck on 12 October 1954. On that day, veteran test pilot George Welch was carrying out a maximum performance test dive followed by a high-G pullout with the ninth production F-100A (52-5764) when his aircraft disintegrated in midair. Deficiencies were found with the design of the airplane and modifications were made. The F-100A's performance was considered good but there were still some major operational deficiencies which prevented the F-100A from being an acceptably-good day fighter. Consequently, the F-100A was never very popular with its flight crews.

=== F-104 Starfighter era ===
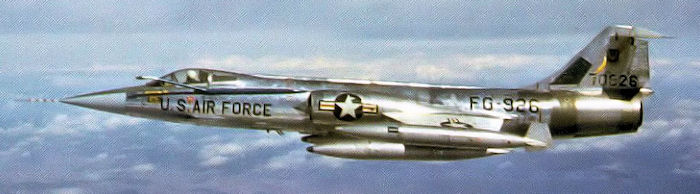
Lockheed F-104C-5-LO Starfighter, AF Ser. No. 57-0926, 479th Tactical Fighter Wing, circa 1960.

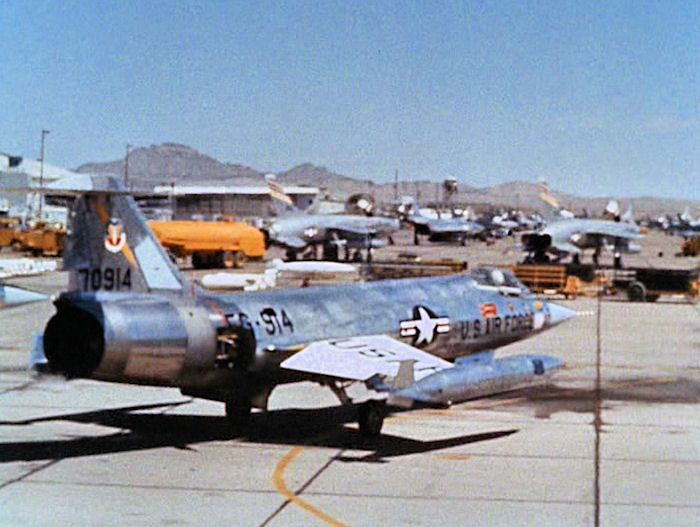
F-104C Starfighter, AF Ser. No. 57-0914, 435th TFS photographed at George AFB, 1965 (Note: Aircraft was deployed to Ubon Royal Thai Air Force Base, Thailand in 1966 and assigned to the 8th Tactical Fighter Wing. It crashed due to engine failure over Thailand 16 January 1967.)

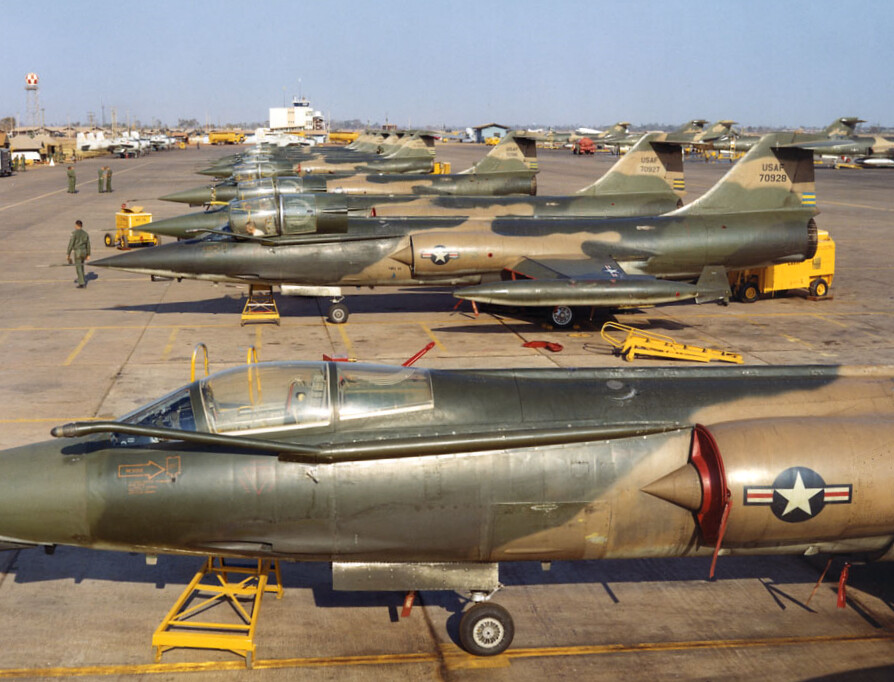
F-104s of the 476 TFS on the Da Nang flightline – 1965

With the F-100A considered to not meet the requirements of an effective air superiority fighter, its service life in the USAF phased out of active inventory, beginning in 1958. Beginning in October 1958, the 479th was re-equipped with a new aircraft: the Lockheed F-104 Starfighter. The Starfighter was primarily intended for a nuclear strike, but Tactical Air Command wanted to use it to carry out ground attack missions with conventional weapons.

However the range, endurance, all-weather capability, and offensive capability of the F-104 made it ill-suited to USAF ground attack needs. Out of a total of 722 Starfighters originally ordered for the USAF, only 296 were actually delivered, the remainder being canceled. However the modifications made to the F-104G led to a large number of foreign sales, with the Starfighter metamorphosing from a mediocre air-superiority day fighter into a highly capable multirole all-weather strike fighter. The excellent flying weather in Southern California gave the 479th a new mission to train F-104 pilots from West Germany, Canada, the Netherlands and Italy during January 1962 – August 1963 as a result of these foreign-sale success of the G-model Starfighter.

During the 1962 Cuban Missile Crisis, the 435th TFS deployed to Naval Air Station Key West, Florida to carry out air strikes against targets in Cuba in case an invasion proved to be necessary. Fortunately, the crisis was peacefully resolved. Following the crisis, Air Defense Command (ADC) organized a squadron of F-104As at Homestead Air Force Base, Florida to defend against possible intrusions by Cuban fighters. However, the F-104A was armed only with AIM-9 Sidewinder missiles and ADC began retrofitting its F-104As with M61 Vulcan cannons. During the first half of 1964, while these planes were being modified, the 479th deployed F-104Cs to Homestead to augment ADC's alert forces there.

The 479th was the only USAF wing to take the F-104C into combat when in April 1965, the 476th TFS deployed to Kung Kuan Air Base, Taiwan. From its base in Taiwan, the squadron began a regular rotation to Da Nang Air Base, South Vietnam where its mission was to fly MiG combat air patrol (MiGCAP) missions to protect USAF F-100 fighter bombers against attack by North Vietnamese fighters. The effect of F-104 deployment upon NVN and PRC MiG operations was immediate and dramatic. NVN MiGs soon learned to avoid contact with USAF strikes being covered by the F-104s. During the entire deployment of the 476th only two fleeting encounters between F-104Cs and enemy fighters occurred.

As the MiG threat abated, the 476th TFS was tasked with some weather reconnaissance and ground attack missions. A few of these were against targets in North Vietnam, but most of them were close air-support missions against targets in the South under forward air controller direction. The F-104s were fairly successful in this role, gaining a reputation for accuracy in their cannon fire and their bombing and capable of quite rapid reaction times in response to requests for air support. During this period, the 476th F-104s maintained an in-commission rate of 94.7%, a testimony both to the quality of 476th maintenance personnel and to the simplicity and maintainability of F-104 systems. However, an F-104 went down during a sortie 100 nm SSW of DaNang on 29 June. The pilot was rescued with minor injuries.

The 436th TFS assumed the 476th's commitment in DaNang on 11 July, and the 436th began flying combat sorties the next day. Although a few MiGCAP missions were flown, the majority of the missions were quick-reaction close-air support missions in support of ground troops. On 23 July, Capt. Roy Blakely attempted to crash-land his battle-damaged F-104C at Chu Lai. Blakely successfully set his aircraft down gear-up, but died when his F-104 swerved off the runway into a sand dune.

The 436th TFS had a bad day on 20 September 1965. F-104C pilot Major Philip E. Smith managed to get lost while flying an EC-121 escort mission over the Gulf of Tonkin. After several equipment failures and incorrect steering commands, he managed to wander over Hainan Island and was shot down by a pair of Chinese MiG-19s (J-6s). He ejected and was taken prisoner. While the rest of the squadron was out looking for Major Smith, two other F-104s had a midair collision while returning to their base. Both pilots ejected and were recovered unharmed.

A week later, another F-104C was shot down by enemy AAA, and its pilot was killed. After these four losses, the remnants of the 436th were rotated back to George in November 1965.

=== F-4 Phantom II ===
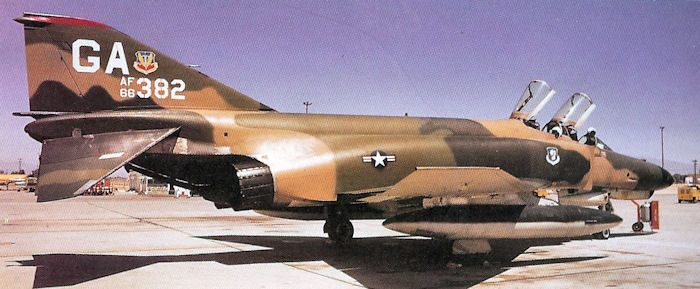
McDonnell Douglas F-4E Phantom II, AF Ser. No. 66-0382, 1970

In December 1965, the wing began transitioning to the McDonnell F-4 Phantom II, and gained two new squadrons (68th, 431st), both equipped with the new F-4D model. The F-4D was an improved version of the F-4C, which had been deployed to South Vietnam the previous April. In February 1966, the wing began F-4 replacement pilot training and reassigned the 435th TFS with its F-104Cs to the 8th Tactical Fighter Wing at Ubon Royal Thai Air Force Base, Thailand. The F-104 remained with the 434th and 436th squadrons until early 1967 when they also were replaced by F-4Ds and the Starfighters were reassigned to the 198th TFS of the Puerto Rico Air National Guard. The F-104Cs replaced that unit's elderly F-86H Sabre fighter-bombers. The 435th was then rotated back to George AFB from Thailand and also re-equipped with Phantoms.

During the Vietnam War, the 479th became the premier F-4 Fighter training wing of the USAF, and F-4D pilots appeared in Southeast Asia for the first time in May 1967. From the spring of 1967, the F-4D gradually began to replace the earlier F-4C in combat over the skies of Vietnam. The first F-4D MiG "kill" took place on 5 June 1967, when crewmen Maj. Everett T. Raspberry and Capt. Francis Gullick shot down a MiG-17 near Hanoi. Since the pilot and the WSO operated as a well-integrated team, both of them were credited with a kill when they scored one.

Along with the USAF fighter pilot training, the 479th began training foreign personnel in F-4 operations and maintenance in March 1969, as they had done in the early 1960s with the F-104. Pilots were trained from Israel, Iran, Japan, and West Germany. In 1969 and 1970, F-4C and early model F-4E aircraft were used by the 4452d and 4535th Combat Crew Training Squadrons.

With the American withdrawal from its South Vietnamese bases in 1971, the 35th Tactical Fighter Wing was moved from Phan Rang Air Base to George. Under a program where combat wings from the Vietnam War were retained in order to preserve and honor their combat heritage, the 479th was inactivated with the 35th absorbing the personnel, equipment and aircraft of the 479th on 1 October 1971.

=== Flying Training Wing ===
The 479th was reactivated as 479th Tactical Training Wing on 1 January 1977 at Holloman Air Force Base, New Mexico, flying the Northrop AT-38 Talon. The 479th TTW's mission was to provide Lead-In Fighter Training (LIFT) training for pilots assigned to fly the spectrum of Air Force fighter and attack aircraft in all service components (active, guard and reserve). Operational squadrons of the wing were:

- 416th Tactical Fighter Training (14 March 1979 – 1 September 1980)(black stripe)

Redesignated 433d TFTS (1 September 1980 – 15 November 1991) (green stripe)

- 434th Tactical Fighter Training (red stripe)
- 435th Tactical Fighter Training (blue stripe)
- 436th Tactical Fighter Training (yellow stripe)

The LIFT program was sharply cut back in 1991, with the training mission and aircraft being consolidated under the 586th Flight Training Squadron.

=== Lineage ===
- Established as the 479th Fighter-Bomber Wing on 15 October 1952

Activated on 1 December 1952
Redesignated 479th Fighter-Day Wing on 15 February 1954
Redesignated 479th Tactical Fighter Wing on 1 July 1958
Inactivated on 1 October 1971

- Redesignated 479th Tactical Training Wing on 22 October 1976

Activated on 1 January 1977
Inactivated on 26 July 1991

=== Assignments ===
- Ninth Air Force, 1 December 1952

Attached to Nineteenth Air Force, 15 March-19 Apr 1956

- Eighteenth Air Force, 1 October 1957
- 831st Air Division, 8 October 1957
- Twelfth Air Force, 20 April-1 Oct 1971, 1 January 1977
- Tactical Training, Holloman, 1 August 1977 – 26 July 1991

=== Components ===
Groups

- 413th Fighter-Day Group: attached 11 November 1954 – 8 October 1957
- 479th Fighter-Bomber (later Fighter-Day) Group: 1 December 1952 – 8 October 1957 (not operational, 1 December 1952 – 11 January 1953).

Squadrons

- 1st Liaison Squadron: attached 8 April 1953 – c. 18 January 1954
- 1st Combat Crew Training Squadron Provisional: attached 3 January-30 Jun 1962
- 68th Tactical Fighter Squadron: attached 6 December 1965 – 14 May 1968, assigned 15 May – l Oct 1968
- 431st Tactical Fighter Squadron: attached 6 December 1965 – 14 June 1968, assigned 15 June 1968 – 30 October 1970 (not operational, 1 January-l Mar 1969 and 1 June-30 Oct 1970)
- 434th Tactical Fighter Training Squadron: attached 1 December 1952 – 11 January 1953; assigned 8 October 1957 – 1 October 1971 (detached 15 March – c.15 August 1960, 11 August-17 Dec 1961; not operational, 3 January 1962 – c. 1 November 1966); assigned 1 January 1977 – 1991
- 435th Tactical Fighter Training Squadron: 8 October 1957–c. 20 July 1966 (detached 7 December 1960–c. 15 April 1961, 19 September 1961 – 22 January 1962, 3 August – 19 December 1962, 30 March – 23 June 1964, 12 October – 20 December 1965· 1 January 1977 – 1991
- 436th Tactical Fighter Training Squadron: attached 3 December 1952 – 11 January 1953, assigned 8 October 1957 – 15 July 1968 (detached c. 11 August – c. 11 December 1960, c. 18 January – c. 12 April 1962, 15 December 1962 – 3 April 1963, 15–30 November 1963, 25 January – 17 February 1965 1 July – 14 October 1965; not operational, 1 July 1967 – 15 July 1968); assigned 30 October 1970 – 8 March 1971 (not operational); assigned 1 January 1977 – 1991 (not operational, 1 January-24 Apr 1977)
- 476th Tactical Fighter Squadron: 8 October 1957 – 25 September 1968 (detached 12 November 1959 – 28 March 1960,8 April-17 Aug 1961, 8 April-10 Aug 1962, 6 January-l Apr 1964, 7 April – 11 July 1968; not operational, 25 May – 28 July 1966)
- 497th Tactical Fighter Squadron: attached 6–8 December 1965 (not operational)
- 4452d Combat Crew Training: 16 January 1967 – 1 October 1971 (not operational, 16 January 1967 – 24 September 1968)
- 4535th Combat Crew Training: 25 September 1968 – 1 October 1971
- 4546th Tactical Fighter Replacement: 1970-1971

=== Stations ===
- George Air Force Base, California, 1 December 1952 – 1 October 1971
- Holloman Air Force Base, New Mexico, 1 January 1977 – 26 July 1991 (deployed to Ching Chuan Kang Air Base, Taiwan, April 1965 – February 1966)

=== Aircraft ===
- North American F-100 Super Sabre, 1956–1959
- Lockheed F-104 Starfighter, 1958–1967
- McDonnell F-4 Phantom II, 1965–1971.
- Northrop T/AT-38A/C Talon, 1977–1991

== See also ==
- List of Lockheed F-104 Starfighter operators
