= 479th Flying Training Group =

479th Flying Training Group

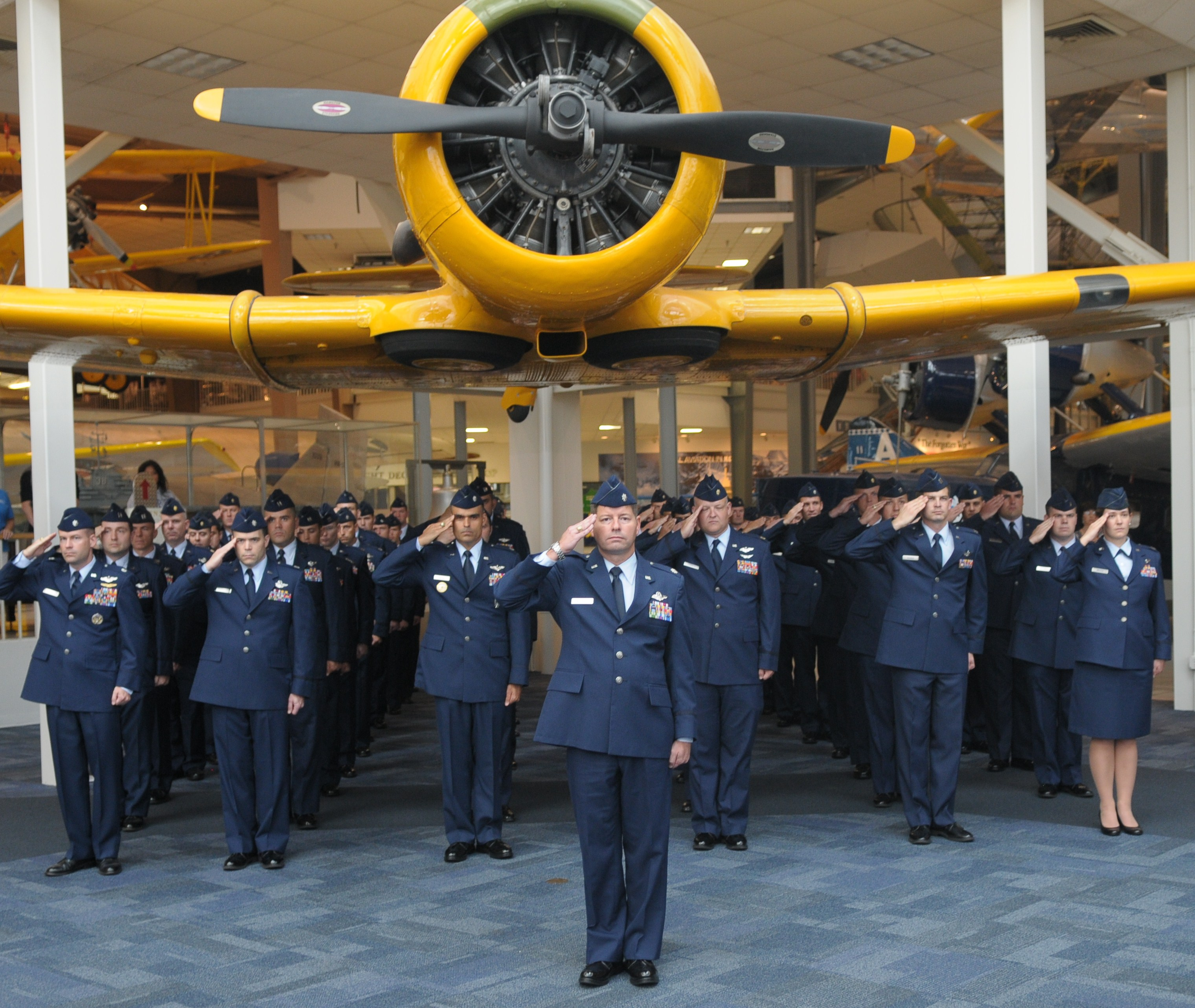
- Members of the 479th Flying Training Group salute during the playing of the National Anthem at the group's activation ceremony
- Active: 1943–1945; 1952–1957; 1991; 2000–2007; 2009–present
- Country: United States
- Branch: United States Air Force
- Role: Fighter/Fighter Training
- Part of: Air Education and Training Command
- Garrison/HQ: Naval Air Station Pensacola, Florida
- Motto: Protectores Libartatis Latin Defenders of Liberty
- Engagements: European Theater of Operations
- Decorations: Distinguished Unit Citation; Air Force Outstanding Unit Award; Croix de Guerre with Palm

Commanders
- Current commander: Colonel Shane "Shamus" Muscato

Insignia
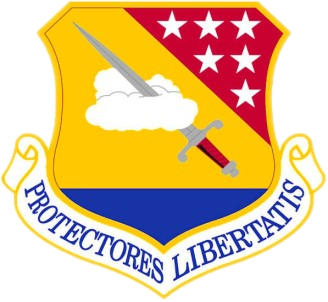
- 479th Flying Training Group emblem (Note: Approved 26 September 2000.)

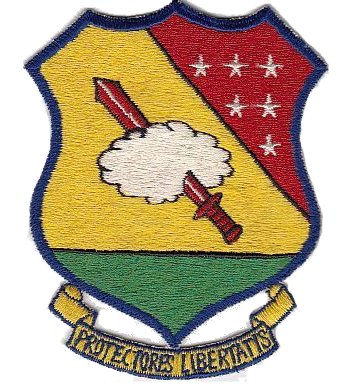
- Patch with 479th Fighter-Bomber Group emblem (Note: Approved 10 September 1954.)

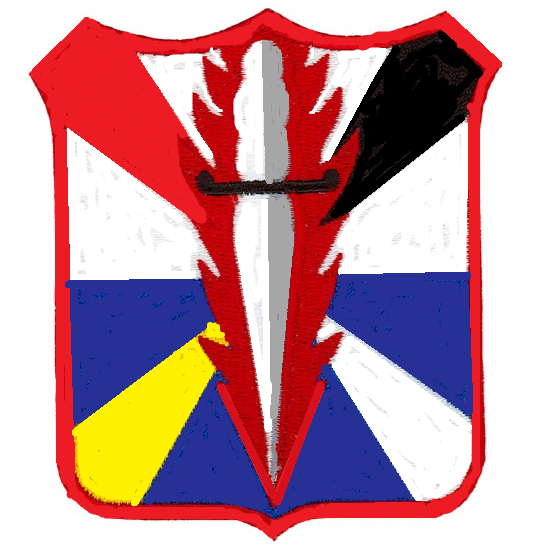
- 479th Fighter Group emblem (World War II)

The 479th Flying Training Group is a United States Air Force unit, stationed at Naval Air Station Pensacola. A component of Air Education and Training Command, the group was activated on 2 October 2009. The current commander of the 479th Flying Training Group is Colonel Shane “Shamus” Muscato.

The group was first activated during World War II in October 1943. After training with Lockheed P-38 Lightnings, it deployed to the European Theater of Operations, and began flying combat missions in late May 1944. It converted to the North American P-51 Mustang later in 1944. It flew escort missions and attacked ground targets, earning a Distinguished Unit Citation before flying its last operational mission in April 1945. The group remained in England following V-E Day, but returned to the United States in the fall and was inactivated at the port of embarkation in December 1945.

The group was again activated as the 479th Fighter-Bomber Group in December 1952, when it assumed the personnel and equipment of an Air National Guard unit that had been mobilized for the Korean War, but was being returned to state control, although it was not fully manned until January 1953. The group was inactivated in 1957, when Tactical Air Command reorganized under the dual deputy system. It was again activated in July 1991 to replace the 479th Tactical Training Wing, which was winding down its operations at Holloman Air Force Base, New Mexico, inactivating six months later. The group was active as a flying training organization from 2000 until 2007.

== Mission ==
The unit conducts Undergraduate Combat Systems Officer (CSO) training, replacing the former Undergraduate Navigator Training (UNT) curriculum previously taught by the 12th Flying Training Wing at Randolph Air Force Base, Texas.

The group is an operational component of the 12th Wing, flying the Beechcraft T-6 Texan II and T-1 Jayhawk. The first CSO class, 11–01, graduated on 15 April 2011.

The group controls four subordinate squadrons:

- 479th Operations Support Squadron
- 451st Flying Training Squadron (T-1A)
- 455th Flying Training Squadron (T-6)
- 479th Student Squadron

== History ==
=== World War II ===
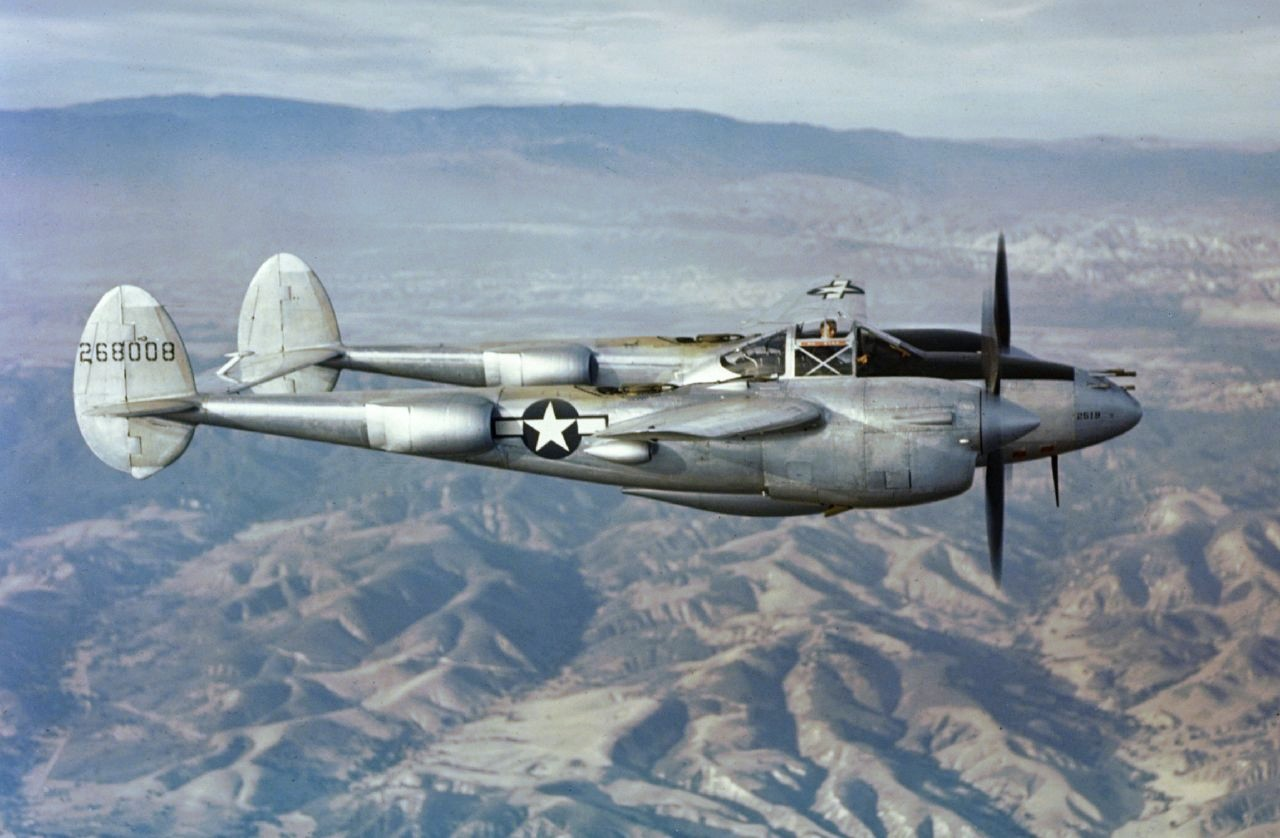
P-38J flying over California.

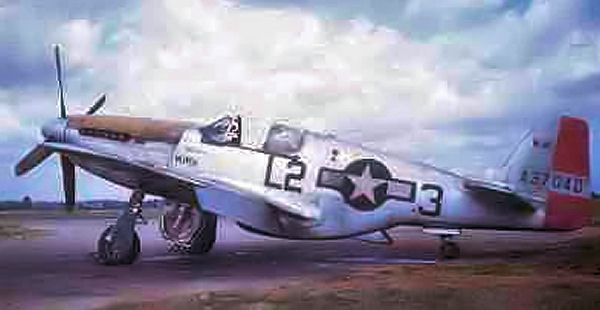
P-51B Mustang from the 434th Fighter Squadron in June 1945 (Note: Aircraft is North American P-51B-5 Mustang serial 42-7040. This P-51B was previously assigned to the 361st Fighter Group at RAF Bottisham and was a replacement for low-hour P-51s reassigned from the group.)

The unit was constituted as the 479th Fighter Group on 12 October 1943 and activated on 15 October at Grand Central Air Terminal, near Long Beach, California. Equipped with the Lockheed P-38 Lightning, the group trained for combat and served as an air defense organization for the west coast as part of IV Fighter Command of Fourth Air Force. It was stationed at Santa Maria Army Air Field, California

Even though the defense of the US west coast initially took priority, it was decided to deploy Lightning squadrons to Britain for heavy bomber escort duty. The 479th was reassigned to RAF Wattisham, England, April–May 1944, and assigned to the 65th Fighter Wing, VIII Fighter Command, Eighth Air Force.

The 479th group consisted of three Fighter Squadrons, (434th (L2), 435th (J2), and 436th (9B)) and the aircraft of the group had no cowling color markings as did other Eighth Air Force fighter groups. 479th P-38s were marked only with colored tail rudders. The initial inventory of P-38s, many of which were hand-me-downs from other groups painted in olive drab camouflage, used geometric symbols on the tail to identify squadrons, white for camouflaged aircraft and black for unpainted (natural metal finish) Lightnings.

The 479th FG escorted heavy bombers during operations against targets on the Continent, strafed targets of opportunity, and flew fighter-bomber, counter-air, and area-patrol missions. Engaged primarily in B-17/B-24 escort activities and fighter sweeps until the Normandy invasion in June 1944.

The group patrolled the beachhead during the invasion. Strafed and dive-bombed troops, bridges, locomotives, railway cars, barges, vehicles, airfields, gun emplacements, flak towers, ammunition dumps, power stations, and radar sites while on escort or fighter-bomber missions as the Allies drove across France during the summer and fall of 1944. The unit flew area patrols to support the breakthrough at Saint-Lô in July and the airborne attack on the Netherlands in September.

The 479th Fighter Group received a Distinguished Unit Citation for the destruction of numerous aircraft on airfields in France on 18 August and 5 September and during aerial battle near Münster on 26 September. The unit continued escort and fighter-bomber activities from October to mid-December 1944. It converted to North American P-51 Mustangs between 10 September and 1 October, using both types on missions until conversion was completed.

The group participated in the Battle of the Bulge (December 1944 – January 1945) by escorting bombers to and from targets in the battle area and by strafing transportation targets while on escort duty. From February to April 1945 it continued to fly escort missions, but also provided area patrols to support the airborne attack across the Rhine in March.

The unit returned to Camp Kilmer, New Jersey in November 1945, and was inactivated in December 1945. Among the notable pilots of the 479th were its second group commander, Colonel Hubert Zemke, with 17.75 confirmed aerial victories and Major Robin Olds, who was officially credited with 12 German planes shot down and 11.5 others destroyed on the ground.

The group remained in England after the end of the war in Europe, demobilizing most of its personnel. The group itself was inactivated as an administrative unit under Army Service Forces in December 1945.

=== Cold War ===
The group was reactivated at George Air Force Base, California on 1 December 1952 as the 479th Fighter-Bomber Group. Under the postwar United States Air Force, the group was the operational component of the new 479th Fighter-Bomber Wing. The 479th's three old World War II squadrons were retained and a new squadron, the 476th Fighter-Bomber/Tactical Fighter Squadron, assigned.

The group trained and achieved tactical proficiency with initially with F-51D Mustangs (1952–53), later with F-86F Sabres (1953–55), and being re-designated as the 479th Fighter-Day Group on 15 February 1954. It participated in numerous exercises, augmented air defenses of the West Coast, and deployed overseas to support other commands. In 1955 the group's assigned squadrons were assigned directly to the Wing, when the unit adopted the "Tri-Deputate" organization, becoming non-operational. It was inactivated on 8 October 1957

=== Flying training ===
==== Holloman AFB ====
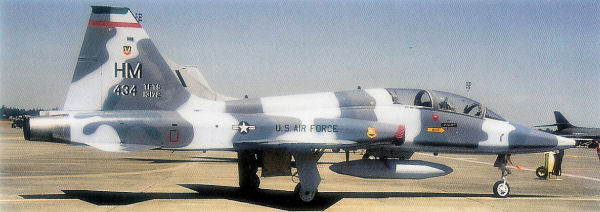
Northrop AT-38B-55-NO Talon AF Serial No. 64-13172 of the 434th TFTS/479th FG.

The 479th was reactivated as 479th Fighter Group at Holloman Air Force Base, New Mexico on 26 July 1991 under the 833d Air Division. The group assumed the downsized assets of the 479th Tactical Training Wing which was inactivated due to cutbacks in training after the end of the Cold War, with the residual resources of the 479th TTW taken over by the 49th Fighter Wing at Holloman.

The group controlled the AT-38s of the 434th Tactical Fighter Training Squadron briefly, providing Lead-In Fighter Training (LIFT) training for pilots assigned to fly the McDonnell Douglas F-15 Eagle. The group inactivated on 15 November 1991.

==== Moody AFB ====
The unit was reactivated as the 479th Flying Training Group at Moody Air Force Base, Georgia on 30 July 2001 as an Air Education and Training Command unit. The group's activation was part of an effort to increase pilot production due to a pilot shortage at the time throughout the Air Force. Its mission at Moody was to conduct primary Specialized Undergraduate Pilot Training and Introduction to Fighter Fundamentals training. The group consisted of three training squadrons. These were :

- 49th Flying Training Squadron (AT-38C)
- 435th Flying Training Squadron (AT-38C)
- 3d Flying Training Squadron (T-6 Texan II)
- 479th Operations Support Squadron

These aircraft all carried the Tail Code "MY". The 49 FTS and 435 FTS also conducted an advanced pilot training and the Introduction to Fighter Fundamentals (IFF) course for recently winged USAF Navigator/Combat Systems Officers en route to Weapons System Officer (WSO) assignments in the F-15E Strike Eagle aircraft and recently winged pilots en route to the F-22, F-15C, F-15E, F-16, and A-10. The 3d FTS provided primary undergraduate pilot training.

As a result of BRAC 2005, the 479 FTG was inactivated on 21 July 2007 and its aircraft and equipment were redistributed to other AETC units.

==== NAS Pensacola ====
The 479 FTG was reactivated at Naval Air Station Pensacola, Florida on 2 October 2009. It is using T-6A Texan IIs and T-1A Jayhawks to train Combat Systems Officers (i.e., Navigators/Electronic Warfare Officers/Weapons System Officers) for eventual assignment to various USAF aircraft. In this capacity, and pursuant to BRAC action, the 479 FTG assumes responsibility for the successor program to USAF Undergraduate Navigator Training (UNT) previously conducted in the T-43 Bobcat and T-1A Jayhawk by the 12th Flying Training Wing at Randolph AFB, Texas from 1993 to 2010 and the T-43 Bobcat and T-37 Tweet with the 323d Flying Training Wing at the former Mather AFB, California from 1973 to 1993.

== Lineage ==
- Established as the 479th Fighter Group (Twin Engine) on 12 October 1943

Activated on 15 October 1943
Redesignated 479th Fighter Group, Two Engine c. 21 February 1944
Apparently redesignated 479th Fighter Group, Single Engine by 5 September 1944
Inactivated on 1 December 1945

- Redesignated 479th Fighter-Bomber Group on 15 October 1952

Activated on 1 December 1952
Redesignated 479th Fighter-Day Group on 15 February 1954
Inactivated on 8 October 1957

- Redesignated 479th Tactical Training Group on 31 July 1985 (remained inactive)
- Redesignated 479th Fighter Group on 1 July 1991

Activated on 26 July 1991
Inactivated on 15 November 1991

- Redesignated 479th Flying Training Group on 6 July 2000

Activated on 31 July 2000
Inactivated on 21 June 2007

- Activated on 2 October 2009

=== Assignments ===
- IV Fighter Command, 15 October 1943
- Los Angeles Fighter Wing, 1 November 1943
- Eighth Air Force, 15 May 1944
- VIII Fighter Command, 16 May 1944
- 2d Bombardment Division, 15 September 1944
- 65th Fighter Wing, 10 October 1944
- Eighth Air Force, by July 1945
- 3d Air Division, 16 July 1945
- 66th Fighter Wing, by October 1945
- 3d Air Division, 16 October 1945
- Army Service Forces by late Nov-1 December 1945
- 479th Fighter-Bomber Wing (later 479th Fighter-Day Wing), 1 December 1952 – 8 October 1957
- 833d Air Division, 26 July – 15 November 1991
- Nineteenth Air Force, 31 July 2000 – 21 June 2007
- 12th Flying Training Wing, 2 October 2009 – present

=== Stations ===
- Grand Central Air Terminal, California, 15 October 1943
- Lomita Flight Strip, California, c. 6 February 1944
- Santa Maria Army Air Field, California, c. 8 April – c. 12 April 1944
- RAF Wattisham (AAF-377), England, c. 15 May 1944 – c. 23 November 1945
- Camp Kilmer, New Jersey, c. 29 November – 1 December 1945
- George Air Force Base, California, 1 December 1952 – 8 October 1957
- Holloman Air Force Base, New Mexico, 26 July – 15 November 1991
- Moody Air Force Base, Georgia, 31 July 2000 – 21 June 2007
- Naval Air Station Pensacola, Florida, 2 October 2009 – present

=== Components ===
- 3d Flying Training Squadron, 2 April 2001 – 26 April 2007
- 49th Flying Training (later, 49th Fighter Training) Squadron: 10 October 2000 – 10 May 2007
- 433d Tactical Fighter Training (later, 433d Fighter) Squadron: 26 July – 15 November 1991
- 434th Fighter (later, 434th Fighter-Bomber; 434th Fighter-Day) Squadron: 15 October 1943 – 1 December 1945; 1 December 1952 – 8 October 1957 (detached 1 December 1952 – 11 January 1953)
- 435th Fighter (later, 435th Fighter-Bomber; 435th Fighter-Day; 435th Flying Training; 435 Fighter Training) Squadron: 15 October 1943 – 1 December 1945; 1 December 1952 – 8 October 1957 (detached 1 December 1952 – 27 March 1953, 26 July – 6 September 1955); 1 October 2001 – 2 March 2007
- 435th Tactical Training (later, 435th Training) Squadron: 26 July – 15 November 1991
- 436th Fighter (later, 436th Fighter-Bomber; 436th Fighter-Day; 436th Tactical Fighter Training) Squadron: 15 October 1943 – 1 December 1945; 1 December 1952 – 8 October 1957 (detached 1 December 1952 – 11 January 1953, 7–27 February 1954); 26 July – 2 August 1991
- 451st Flying Training Squadron, 2 October 2009 – present
- 455th Flying Training Squadron, 2 October 2009 – present
- 479th Operations Support Squadron, 2 October 2009 – present

=== Aircraft ===
- Lockheed P-38 Lightning, 1943–1944
- North American P-51 (later F-51) Mustang, 1944–1945; 1952–1953
- North American F-86 Sabre, 1953–1956
- Northrop AT-38 Talon, 1991; 2000–2007
- Beechcraft T-6 Texan II 2000–present
- Raytheon T-1 Jayhawk 2009–present
