= 12th Flying Training Wing =

12th Flying Training Wing

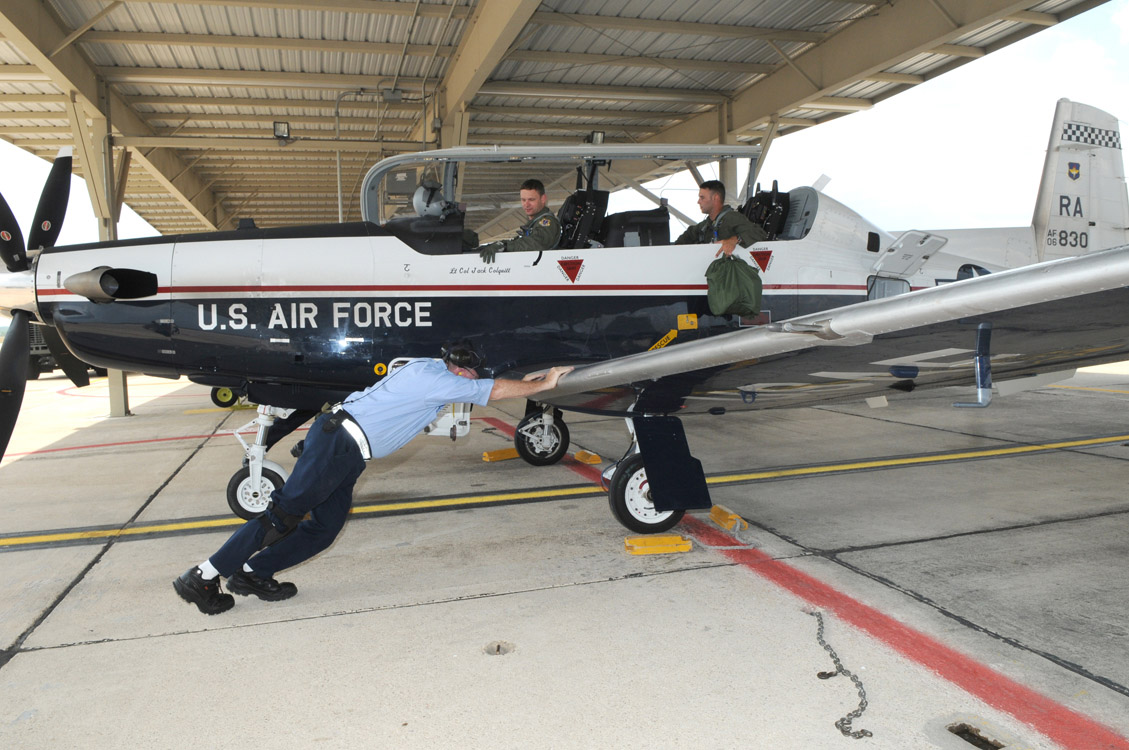
- 12th Flying Training Wing T-6A Texan II (Note: Aircraft is Raytheon T-6A Texan II, serial 06-3830.)
- Active: 1950–1958; 1962–1971; 1972–present
- Country: United States
- Branch: United States Air Force
- Role: Flying Training
- Part of: Air Education and Training Command
- Garrison/HQ: Randolph Air Force Base
- Engagements: Vietnam War
- Decorations: Presidential Unit Citation; Air Force Outstanding Unit Award with Combat "V" Device; Air Force Outstanding Unit Award; Republic of Vietnam Gallantry Cross with Palm

Commanders
- Current commander: Col. James S. Long II
- Deputy commander: Col. Jeffrey S. Cameron
- Command Chief: CCM Ismael R. Rosa JR
- Notable commanders: Nicholas Kehoe; Lloyd W. Newton

Insignia
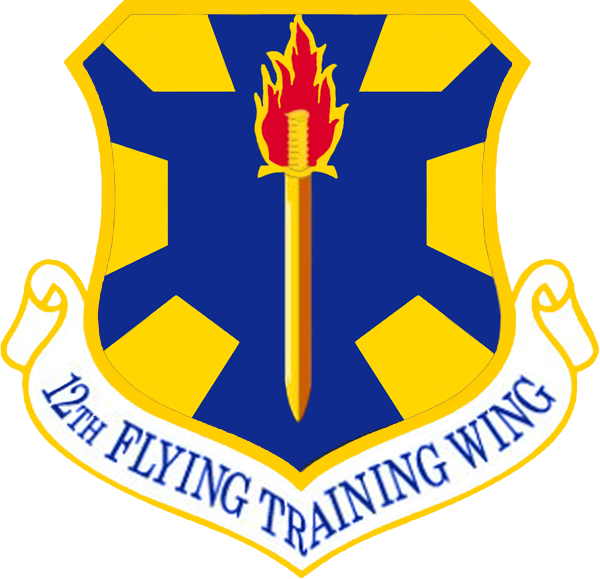
- 12th Flying Training Wing emblem (Note: Approved 15 March 1963, based on emblem approved for the 12th Operations Group on 3 February 1942.)

The 12th Flying Training Wing is a United States Air Force unit assigned to Air Education and Training Command's Nineteenth Air Force. It is headquartered at Joint Base San Antonio, Texas. The wing is the parent organization for the 479th Flying Training Group, located at NAS Pensacola, Florida and the 306th Flying Training Group, at The United States Air Force Academy, Colorado. The 12th Wing is the only unit in the Air Force conducting both pilot instructor training and combat systems officer training.

The wing fought in combat as the 12th Tactical Fighter Wing during the Vietnam War and was the host unit at two major air bases in South Vietnam. Its McDonnell Douglas F-4 Phantom II aircraft flew thousands of combat missions between 1965 and 1971 before being withdrawn as part of the U.S. withdrawal from Vietnam and Southeast Asia.

The current Commander of the 12th Flying Training Wing is Colonel Peter J.S. Lee. The current Vice Commander is Colonel Daniel E. Rueth. The current Command Chief Master Sergeant is Chief Master Sergeant Daniel J. Cain.

== Units ==
The wing consists of three flying groups and a maintenance directorate spanning more than 1,600 miles from JBSA-Randolph, Texas to Naval Air Station Pensacola, Florida, to Pueblo Memorial Airport and the U.S. Air Force Academy in Colorado.

The 12th Operations Group controls all Instructor Pilot Training and airfield operations at Randolph AFB and Randolph AFB Auxiliary Field/Seguin Field.

The 479th Flying Training Group is a geographically separated unit located at Naval Air Station Pensacola, Florida and conducts Undergraduate Combat Systems Officer Training.

The 306th Flying Training Group is a geographically separated unit located at the United States Air Force Academy, Colorado. The 306 FTG conducts powered flight training, soaring, and parachute training for Air Force Academy cadets.

- 12th Operations Group
  - 99th Flying Training Squadron
  - 435th Fighter Training Squadron
  - 558th Flying Training Squadron
  - 559th Flying Training Squadron
  - 560th Flying Training Squadron
- 306th Flying Training Group
  - 1st Flying Training Squadron
  - 94th Flying Training Squadron
  - 98th Flying Training Squadron
  - 557th Flying Training Squadron
- 479th Flying Training Group
  - 451st Flying Training Squadron
  - 455th Flying Training Squadron

== History ==
The wing was first organized at Turner Air Force Base, Georgia on 1 November 1950 as the 12th Fighter-Escort Wing, but moved a month later to Bergstrom Air Force Base, Texas.

The wing was reactivated as the 12th Tactical Fighter Wing and organized in April 1962 at MacDill Air Force Base, Florida. It then fought in Vietnam during the American War with the Seventh Air Force.

=== Vietnam War ===
On 8 November 1965 the wing moved to Cam Ranh Bay Air Base, South Vietnam The 12th was the first permanently assigned McDonnell Douglas F-4 Phantom II wing assigned to Southeast Asia. Operational squadrons of the wing at Cam Ranh were:

- 557th Tactical Fighter Squadron 1 December 1965 – 31 March 1970 (F-4C Tail Code: XC)}}
- 558th Tactical Fighter Squadron 8 November 1965 – 31 March 1970 (F-4C Tail Code: XD/XT)
- 43rd Tactical Fighter Squadron 8 November 1965 – 4 January 1966 (F-4C)
- : Replaced by: 559th Tactical Fighter Squadron 1 January 1966 – 31 March 1970 (F-4C Tail Code: XN)
- 391st Tactical Fighter Squadron 26 January 1966 – 22 July 1968 (F-4C Tail Code: XT) diverted from the still incomplete Phan Rang Air Base

From Cam Ranh Bay the wing carried out close air support, interdiction and combat air patrol activities over South Vietnam, North Vietnam and Laos.

On 31 March 1970, as part of the Vietnamization process the wing was reassigned without personnel or equipment to Phù Cát Air Base taking over the assets of the inactivated 37th Tactical Fighter Wing. On 17 November 1971 the 12th TFW was inactivated.

=== Flying Training ===
The wing was redesignated the 12th Flying Training Wing and activated on 1 May 1972, when the personnel, mission and equipment of the 3510th Flying Training Wing were assumed by the wing, while the 3510th was simultaneously inactivated

In 1992, due to the impending closure of Mather Air Force Base, California, the 12 FTW also assumed responsibility for Undergraduate Navigator Training (UNT) and Interservice Undergraduate Navigator Training (IUNT) from the 323d Flying Training Wing (323 FTW) at Mather when that organization inactivated, with most T-43A aircraft and some of the 323 FTW squadrons reforming at Randolph AFB under the 12 FTW. In 2009, with the transition of UNT to undergraduate Combat Systems Officer training (UCSOT) and pursuant to earlier Base Realignment and Closure Commission (BRAC) directives, the 12 FTW established a new organization, the 479th Flying Training Group (479 FTG), with two new flying training squadrons and an operations support squadron, as a GSU at Naval Air Station Pensacola, Florida. Although NAS Pensacola is the principal base for student Naval Flight Officer (SNFO) training for the U.S. Navy and U.S. Marine Corps, the 479 FTG operates independently of this program with its own USAF T-6 Texan II and T-1 Jayhawk aircraft. Upon establishment of the 479 FTG at NAS Pensacola, the remaining "legacy" navigator training squadrons that had relocated from the former Mather AFB to Randolph AFB in 1992 were inactivated.

In the second decade of the 21st century, the wing's mission is to provide instructor pilot training in the Raytheon-Beech T-6A Texan II, the Northrop T-38 Talon and the Beech T-1A Jayhawk jet trainers. Previously, the wing also conducted Introduction to Fighter Fundamentals (IFF) in the Northrop AT-38 Talon, a role now performed with T-38s.

Until late 2010, the wing also conducted Joint Specialized Undergraduate Navigator Training (JSUNT) and electronic warfare officer (EWO) training in the T-1A Jayhawk and Boeing T-43A medium-range turbofan jet at Randolph AFB. With the retirement of the T-43 in September 2010, this training merged with extant USAF weapons systems officer (WSO) training that had been conducted jointly with the U.S. Navy and U.S. Marine Corps at Naval Air Station Pensacola, Florida since 1990. The navigator, EWO and WSO training tracks were then merged and all three specialties (which wear the same type of uniform insignia wings upon completion of flight training) became known as Combat Systems Officer (CSO). This updated CSO training is now conducted by the 479th Flying Training Group as a Geographically Separated Unit (GSU) of the 12 FTW at NAS Pensacola utilizing T-6 Texan II and T-1A Jayhawk aircraft.

The wing is responsible for numerous aviation training programs. These programs include Pilot Instructor Training, Combat Systems Officer Training, Remotely Piloted Aircraft Pilot Indoctrination, Basic Sensor Operator Qualification, Airmanship programs for U.S. Air Force Academy cadets, and Introductory Flight Screening.

== Lineage ==
- Established as the 12th Fighter-Escort Wing on 27 October 1950

Activated on 1 November 1950
Redesignated 12th Strategic Fighter Wing on 20 January 1953
Redesignated 12th Fighter-Day Wing on 1 July 1957
Inactivated on 8 January 1958

- Redesignated 12th Tactical Fighter Wing, and activated, on 17 April 1962 (not organized)

Organized on 25 April 1962
Inactivated on 17 November 1971

- Redesignated 12th Flying Training Wing on 22 March 1972

Activated on 1 May 1972

=== Assignments ===
- Second Air Force, 1 November 1950
- Eighth Air Force, 5 December 1950
- 42d Air Division, 9 April 1951 – 8 January 1958 (attached to 7th Air Division 20 July – 30 November 1951, 39th Air Division, 18 May – 10 August 1953; 10 May – 7 August 1954)
- Tactical Air Command, 17 April 1962 (not organized)
- Ninth Air Force, 25 April 1962
- 836th Air Division, 1 July 1962
- 2d Air Division, 8 November 1965
- Seventh Air Force, 1 April 1966 – 17 November 1971
- Air Training Command (later Air Education and Training Command), 1 May 1972
- Nineteenth Air Force, 1 July 1993
- Air Education and Training Command, 12 July 2012
- Nineteenth Air Force; 1 October 2014 – present

=== Components ===
Groups

- 12th Air Base Group (later 12th Combat Support Group, 12th Support Group, 12th Mission Support Group): 1 November 1950 – 6 August 1951, 14 February 1952 – 16 June 1952, 8 November 1965 – 17 November 1971; 1 May 1972 – 1 August 2009
- 12th Fighter-Escort Group (later 12th Operations Group): 1 November 1950 – 16 June 1952; 15 December 1991 – present
- 12th Maintenance & Supply Group (later 12th Logistics Group, 12th Maintenance Group): 1 November 1950 – 10 February 1951, 14 February 1952 – 16 June 1952; 15 December 1991 – 18 May 2004; 2 January 2017 – present
- 306th Flying Training Group: 1 June 2012 – present
- 479th Flying Training Group: 2 October 2009 – present

Squadrons

- 1st Flight Screening Squadron: 15 July-15 December 1991
- 27th Air Refueling Squadron: attached 1 April-1 September 1955
- 43d Tactical Fighter: attached 8 November 1965-c. 4 January 1966
- 45th Tactical Fighter: attached 8 May-1 July 1962
- 389th Tactical Fighter: 31 March 1970 – 15 October 1971
- 391st Tactical Fighter: attached 26 January-22 June 1966, assigned 23 June 1966 – 22 July 1968
- 480th Tactical Fighter: 31 March 1970 – 17 November 1971
- 506th Air Refueling Squadron: attached 8 August 1955 – 1 July 1957
- 555th Tactical Fighter: 8 January 1964 – 25 March 1966 (detached 8 December 1964 – 18 March 1965, 6 November 1965 – 25 March 1966)
- 557th Tactical Fighter: 25 April 1962 – 8 November 1965; 1 December 1965 – 31 March 1970
- 558th Tactical Fighter: 25 April 1962 – 31 March 1970 (detached 9 March-16 June 1965, 3 February-22 July 1968)
- 559th Fighter-Escort (later, Strategic Fighter; Fighter-Day; Tactical Fighter): attached 10 February 1951 – 15 June 1952, assigned 16 June 1952 – 8 January 1958; assigned 25 April 1962 – 8 November 1965 (detached 9 June-7 September 1965); assigned 27 December 1965 – 31 March 1970; assigned 1 May 1972 – 15 December 1991
- 560th Fighter-Escort (later, Strategic Fighter; Fighter-Day): attached 10 February 1951 – 15 June 1952, assigned 16 June 1952 – 8 January 1958; 1 May 1972 – 15 December 1991
- 561st Fighter-Escort (later, Strategic Fighter; Fighter-Day; Tactical Fighter): attached 10 February 1951 – 1 April 1952; assigned 16 June 1952 – 8 January 1958 (detached 16 June-16 December 1952)

School

- USAF Navigator School: 14 May 1993 – Nov 2010
  - Assumed role from inactivated 323rd Flying Training Wing
  - Role assumed by 479th Flying Training Group as a GSU of 12 FTW, Nov 2010
    - USAF Navigators now known as USAF Combat Systems Officers

=== Stations ===
- Turner Air Force Base, Georgia, 1 November 1950
- Bergstrom Air Force Base, Texas, 5 December 1950 – 8 January 1958
- MacDill Air Force Base, Florida, 25 April 1962 – 31 October 1965
- Cam Ranh AB, South Vietnam, 8 November 1965
- Phù Cát Air Base, South Vietnam, 31 March 1970 – 17 November 1971
- Randolph AFB, Texas, 1 May 1972–present
  - Additional GSU at NAS Pensacola, Florida, November 2009–present
  - Additional GSU at USAF Academy, Colorado, July 2013 – present

=== Aircraft ===
- Republic F-84 Thunderjet, 1950–1957
- Boeing KB-29 Superfortress, 1955–1957
- Republic F-84 Thunderjet, 1962–1964
- McDonnell Douglas F-4 Phantom II, 1964–1970, 1970–1971
- Convair T-29 Flying Classroom, 1972–1974
- Cessna T-37 Tweet, 1972–2007
- Northrop T-38 Talon, 1972–present
- North American T-39 Sabreliner, 1972–1978, 1990–1991
- Cessna T-41 Mescalero, 1972–1973, 1992–1994
- Boeing T-43, 1992–2010
- Learjet C-21, 1993–1997
- Northrop AT-38 Talon (weapons trainer), 1993–2002
- Raytheon T-1 Jayhawk, 1993–present
- Slingsby T-3 Firefly, 1994–1998
- Beechcraft T-6 Texan II, 2000–present
