= 451st Flying Training Squadron =

Active United States Air Force unit

451st Flying Training Squadron

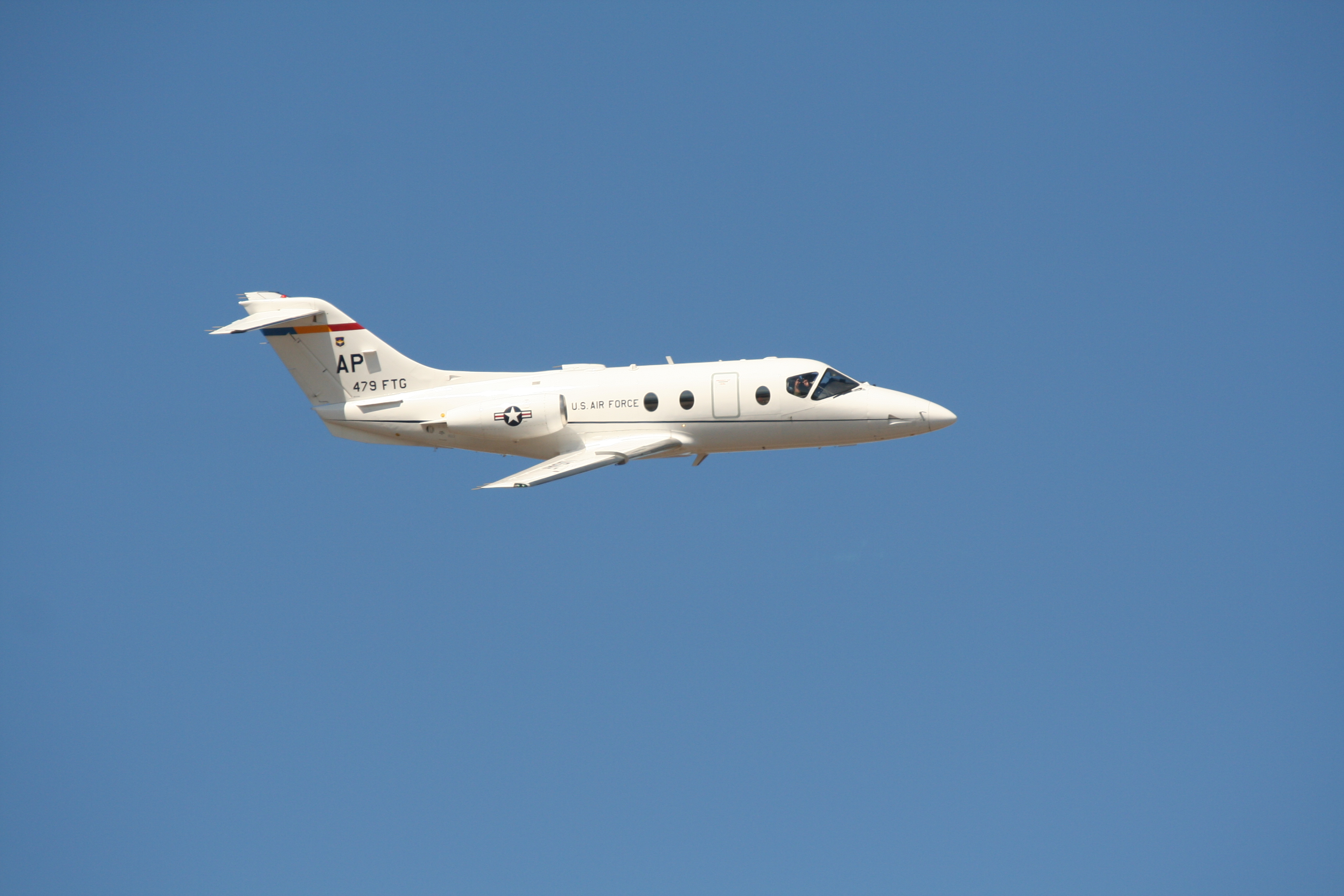
- USAF T-1A Jayhawk at NAS Pensacola
- Active: 1942–1945; 1947–1949; 1973–1993, 2009–present
- Country: United States
- Branch: United States Air Force
- Role: Flying training
- Part of: Air Education and Training Command
- Garrison/HQ: Naval Air Station Pensacola
- Engagements: European Theater of Operations
- Decorations: Distinguished Unit Citation; Air Force Outstanding Unit Award

Insignia
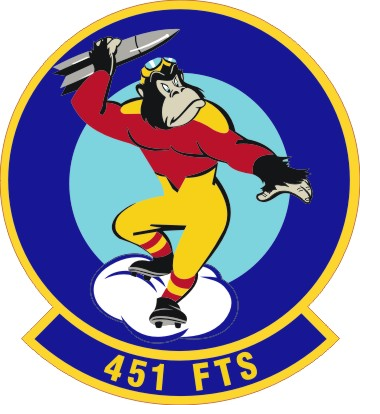
- 451 Flying Training Sq emblem

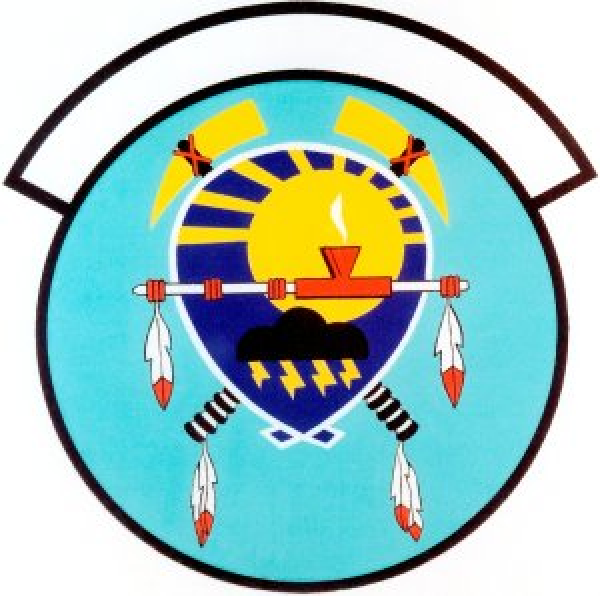
- 451 Flying Training Squadron emblem (Note: Approved 30 May 1973.)

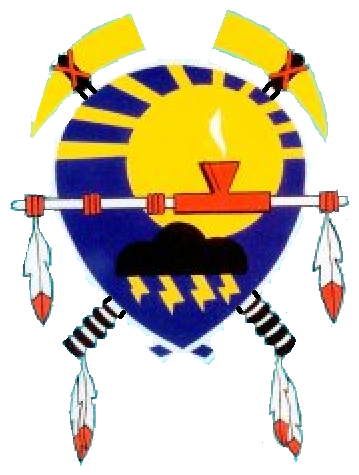
- 451st Fighter-Day Squadron emblem (Note: Approved 2 May 1955. Description: On an American Indian war shield Air Force blue, a stylized sun with rays Air Force yellow, surmounted in base by a cloud black, with lightning yellow, superimposed over the center of the shield a peace pipe, stem white, bowl and detail red, feathered white and red, with white smoke rising from the bowl; the shield over two tomahawks in saltire, the head yellow, the handle black with leather thongs red, feathered white and red.)

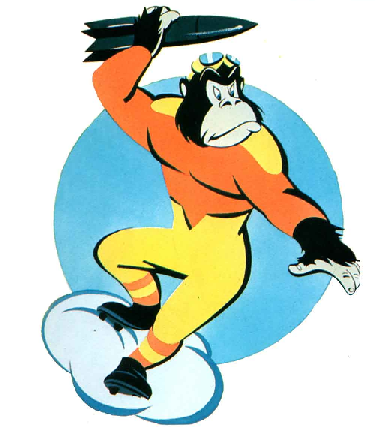
- 451st Bombardment Squadron emblem
- World War II Fuselage Code: SS

The 451st Flying Training Squadron is an active United States Air Force unit. It is assigned to the 479th Flying Training Group, stationed at Naval Air Station Pensacola, Florida. The squadron was first activated as the 451st Bombardment Squadron in July 1942. After training in the United States, it deployed to the European Theater of Operations (ETO) in December 1942. It engaged in combat operations from 1943 to 1945, earning a Distinguished Unit Citation for demonstrating the effectiveness of medium bombers in the ETO. Following V-E Day, it participated in the disarmament of the Luftwaffe until September 1945, when it returned to the United States for inactivation.

The squadron served in the reserves from August 1947 to June 1949, when it was inactivated when Continental Air Command reorganized its flying unis, although it does not appear to have been fully manned or equipped with operational aircraft at this time.

The squadron was activated in July 1954 as the 451st Fighter-Day Squadron and equipped with North American F-86 Sabre fighters. Although it soon upgraded to the supersonic North American F-100 Super Sabre it was inactivated in November 1957, when Tactical Air Command reduced the number of fighter groups at Foster Air Force Base from two to one.

In 1973, Air Training Command was converting its flying training units from MAJCON status. As part of this reorganization, the squadron was redesignated the 451st Flying Training Squadron and replaced the 3538th Navigator Training Squadron at Mather Air Force Base, California. It conducted flight training for members of the United States military and foreign allies until inactivating in January 1992 as Mather prepared for closure. It was reactivated in October 2009 as the home for USAF officers training as combat systems officers.

== Mission ==
The squadron conducts advanced undergraduate combat systems officer training in the T-25 training device. The unit trains more than 350 active duty, guard and reserve officers in advanced navigation, electronic warfare, special operations, and weapon systems employment. Trainees come to the 451st upon completion of primary training in the 455th Flying Training Squadron. Graduates then attend formal training units throughout the combat, mobility and special operations air forces. The squadron also conducts instructor combat systems officer training.

== History ==
=== World War II ===
==== Initial organization and training ====
The squadron was first activated at MacDill Field, Florida on 17 July 1942 as the 451st Bombardment Squadron, one of the four original squadrons of the 322nd Bombardment Group. However, it did not receive its initial cadre until 7 August. It was equipped with Martin B-26 Marauders and trained with them at MacDill and at Drane Field, Florida. The ground echelon of the squadron departed for the Port of Embarkation in November and sailed for the United Kingdom aboard the RMS Queen Elizabeth on 24 November, arriving in the United Kingdom six days later. The air echelon continued training in Florida until it began to ferry its Marauders from Morrison Field to Europe via the South Atlantic ferry route as new aircraft became available. The 451st was the third squadron of the group to leave the United States, not leaving for England until March 1943, with its last B-26 arriving in the combat theater by May 1943.

==== Combat in the European Theater ====
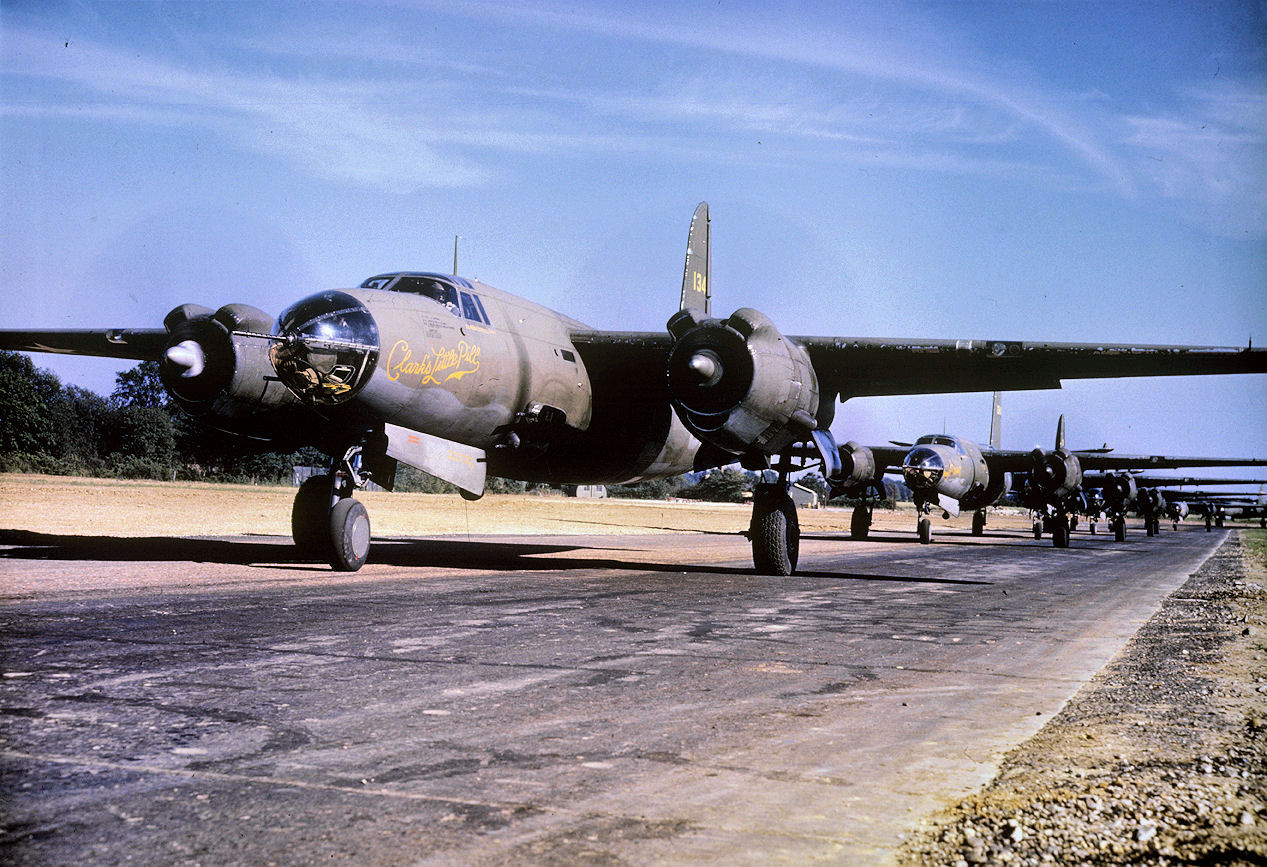
322nd Group B-26s line up for takeoff, led by a squadron aircraft (Note: Aircraft is Martin B-26C-15-MO Marauder, serial 41-34969, Clark's Little Pill. Picture is identified as taken at Andrews Field in October 1943, but Baugher identifies the plane as lost on 9 September 1943. Baugher, Joe (10 August 2023). "1941 USAF Serial Numbers". Joe Baugher.)

The ground echelon was established at RAF Rattlesden, its first combat station on 1 December 1942. The 322d Group flew its first mission, and the first B-26 Marauder mission in the European Theater of Operations, on 14 May against an electrical power plant near IJmuiden in the Netherlands using low level attack tactics. Three days later, it dispatched eleven planes for a repeat low level attack on the IJmuiden power plant and another at Haarlem in the Netherlands. One plane returned early due to a mechanical malfunction. The remaining ten aircraft and their crews were lost to enemy action. For these actions and for demonstrating the effectiveness of medium bombers, the 322nd Group, including the squadron, was awarded the Distinguished Unit Citation. (Note: It does not appear that any squadron aircraft participated in the two raids of May 1943. See Freeman, p. 57 (noting that the squadron had just arrived in theater and did not participate). Following the raids, the 322nd was withdrawn from combat for training ln medium altitude bombing and equipping its planes for that tactic, returning to combat on 17 July. Although the squadron was cited for the period beginning in May, the Air Force Historical Research Agency edited the start date of the award to the squadron to 17 July.)

In June 1943, the squadron, along with all other B-26 units in England moved to Essex, an area where it was planned to build up a tactical air force for the forthcoming invasion of Europe, with the 451st arriving at RAF Great Saling on 12 June. Once the squadron entered combat, enemy airfields were its principal targets through February 1944, but it also attacked power stations, shipyards, construction works, marshalling yards and other targets. In March 1944, its emphasis shifted to railway and highway bridges, and oil storage facilities in preparation for Operation Overlord, the invasion of Normandy. It also participated in Operation Crossbow, the attacks on V-1 flying bomb and V-2 rocket launch sites.

On D-Day, the squadron attacked coastal defenses and artillery batteries. It supported the Allies in the Battle for Caen and in Operation Cobra, the breakout at Saint Lo in July. Through August and September, it provided air support for the drive of United States Third Army across Northern France.

In late September, the squadron moved from England to Beauvais/Tille Airfield, France. It bombed bridges, road junctions, defended villages, and ordnance depots in the assault on the Siegfried Line from October through December of 1944. During the Battle of the Bulge, it flew attacks on railroad bridges to cut German lines of communications. From then until it flew its last mission on 24 April 1945, it concentrated on communications, bridges, marshalling yards and fuel dumps.

Following V-E Day, most aircrews and the unit's aircraft were transferred to other units. The remaining personnel of the 451st moved to Arolsen as part of the military occupation force. It engaged in inventorying and disassembling Luftwaffe equipment until September 1945. In December it returned to the United States and was inactivated at the Port of Embarkation on 11 December 1945.

=== Reserve operations ===
The squadron was reactivated in the reserves on 9 August 1947 at Reading Army Air Field, Pennsylvania, where its training was supervised by the 438th AAF Base Unit (later the 2237 Air Force Reserve Training Center). It does not appear to have been fully manned and was equipped only with trainer aircraft. In July 1948 Continental Air Command (ConAC) assumed responsibility for managing reserve and Air National Guard units from ADC. In June 1949, ConAC reorganized its flying units under the Wing/Base organization and the 451st was inactivated and its personnel were transferred to the 319th Bombardment Wing.

=== Fighter operations ===
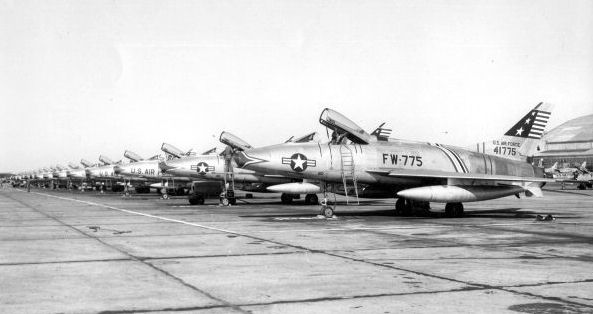
F-100s at Foster AFB in 1956 (Note: Aircraft in foreground is North American F-100C-5-NA Super Sabre, serial 54-1775. This plane was shot down in Southeast Asia on 2 August 1968. Baugher, Joe (24 July 2023). "1954 USAF Serial Numbers". Joe Baugher.)

The squadron was redesignated the 451st Fighter-Day Squadron and activated at Foster Air Force Base, Texas as Tactical Air Command took over Foster from Air Training Command (ATC). It was initially equipped with North American F-86 Sabre fighters, but by 1955 was replacing them with supersonic North American F-100 Super Sabres. The squadron deployed its Super Sabres to Wendover Air Force Base, Utah in January 1957. However, the Air Force decided to close Foster. In November 1957, the 450th Fighter-Day Wing reduced to a single group and the squadron was inactivated along with other elements of the 322nd Fighter-Day Group.

=== Flying training ===
==== Background ====
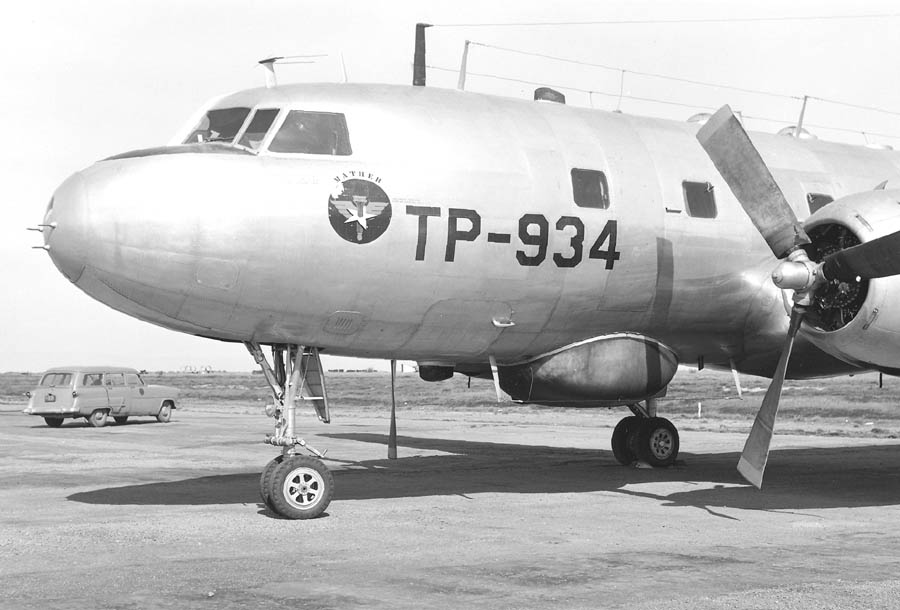
Convair T-29C from Mather AFB

The 3538th Navigator Training Squadron was established at Mather Air Force Base on 1 April 1965. The navigator training program at Mather expanded at this time as navigator training at James Connally Air Force Base ended and navigator training was concentrated at Mather. A number of Convair T-29 Flying Classrooms equipped with special electronics were transferred from James Connally to Mather in connection with this change.

However, the 3538th was a Major Command controlled (MAJCON) unit, created by ATC. MAJCON units could not carry a permanent history or lineage. ATC received authority from Headquarters USAF to discontinue its MAJCON flying training wings and to activate Air Force controlled (AFCON) units, most of which were inactive at the time, which could carry a lineage and history in their place.

==== Navigator training ====
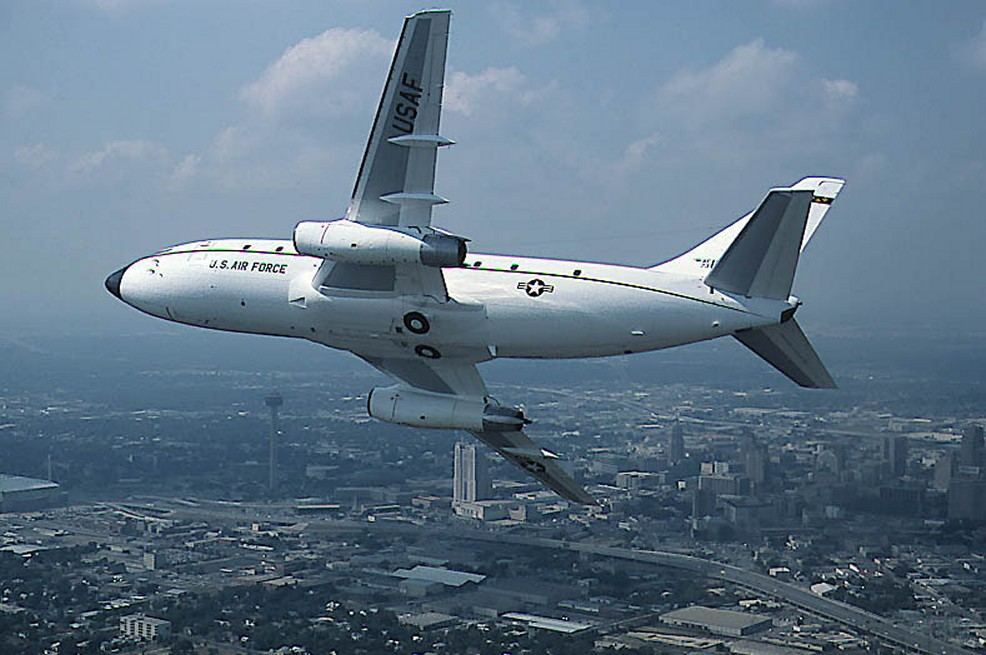
T-43 Bobcat as flown by the squadron

On 1 April 1973, the squadron was activated as the 451st Flying Training Squadron. It absorbed the personnel, mission and resources of the 3538th Navigator Training Squadron which was simultaneously inactivated. In 1978, the first females began navigator training. It continued to conduct undergraduate navigator training for USAF, United States Navy, United States Marine Corps, and United States allies until 1992. In 1989, the base closure commission recommended that Mather be closed. The Air Force moved its navigator training to Randolph Air Force Base, Texas and the squadron was inactivated on 15 January 1992 as Mather drew down in preparing for closing on 1 October 1993.

==== Combat systems officer training ====
The squadron was reactivated at Naval Air Station Pensacola on 2 October 2009. Since then, it conducted advanced training for Air Force combat systems officers using 21 modified T-1A Jayhawk aircraft until the aircraft was retired in 2025. The squadron now exclusively uses simulators to accomplish its training mission.

== Lineage ==
- Constituted as the 451st Bombardment Squadron (Medium) on 19 June 1942

Activated on 17 July 1942
Redesignated 451st Bombardment Squadron, Medium on 20 August 1943
Inactivated on 11 December 1945

- Redesignated 451st Bombardment Squadron, Light on 3 July 1947

Activated in the reserve on 9 August 1947
Inactivated on 27 June 1949

- Redesignated 451st Fighter-Day Squadron on 24 March 1954

Activated on 1 July 1954
Inactivated on 18 November 1957.

- Redesignated 451st Flying Training Squadron on 28 July 1972

Activated on 1 April 1973
Inactivated on 15 January 1992
Activated on 2 October 2009

=== Assignments ===
- 322d Bombardment Group, 17 July 1942 – 11 December 1945
- 322d Bombardment Group, 9 August 1947 – 27 June 1949
- 322d Fighter-Day Group, 1 July 1954 – 18 November 1957
- 323d Flying Training Wing, 1 April 1973
- 323d Operations Group, 15 December 1991 – 15 January 1992
- 479th Flying Training Group, 2 October 2009 – present

=== Stations ===
- MacDill Field, Florida, 17 July 1942
- Drane Field, Florida, 22 September 1942
- Camp Kilmer, New Jersey, 15–23 November 1942
- RAF Rattlesden (AAF-126), England, 1 December 1942
- RAF Bury St Edmunds (Rougham) (AAF-468), England, 22 May 1943
- RAF Great Saling (later Andrews Field) (AAF-485), England, 12 June 1943
- Beauvais/Tille Airfield (A-61) (also B-42), France, c. 23 September 1944
- Le Culot Airfield (A-89) (also B-68), Belgium, 6 April 1945
- Arolsen, Germany, 26 June 1945
- Clastres Airfield, France, c. 1 October-2 December 1945
- Camp Kilmer, New Jersey, 9–11 December 1945
- Reading Army Air Field (later Reading Municipal Airport), Pennsylvania, 9 August 1947 – 27 June 1949
- Foster Air Force Base, Texas, 1 July 1954 – 18 November 1957 (deployed to Wendover Air Force Base, Utah, 3 January – 4 February 1957)
- Mather Air Force Base, California, 1 April 1973 – 15 January 1992
- Naval Air Station Pensacola, Florida, 2 October 2009 – present

.

=== Aircraft ===
- Martin B-26 Marauder (1942–1945)
- North American AT-6 Texan (1947–1949)
- Beechcraft AT-7 Navigator (1947–1949)
- Beechcraft AT-11 Kansan (1947–1949)
- North American F-86 Sabre (1954–1955)
- North American F-100 Super Sabre (1955–1957)
- Convair T-29 Flying Classroom (1973–1975)
- Boeing T-43 Bobcat (1973–1993)
- Raytheon T-1A Jayhawk (2009–2025)

=== Awards and campaigns ===
Award streamer	Award	Dates	Notes
	Distinguished Unit Citation	[17 July] 1943 – 24 July 1944	European Theater of Operations, 451st Bombardment Squadron
	Air Force Outstanding Unit Award	1 April – 31 December 1973	451st Flying Training Squadron
	Air Force Outstanding Unit Award	1 January 1976 – 28 February 1977	451st Flying Training Squadron
	Air Force Outstanding Unit Award	1 January 1978 – 30 April 1979	451st Flying Training Squadron
	Air Force Outstanding Unit Award	1 January 1980 – 30 April 1981	451st Flying Training Squadron
	Air Force Outstanding Unit Award	1 July 2009 – 30 June 2011	451st Flying Training Squadron
	Air Force Outstanding Unit Award	1 July 2011 – 30 June 2013	451st Flying Training Squadron
	Air Force Outstanding Unit Award	1 July 2013 – 30 June 2015	451st Flying Training Squadron
	Air Force Outstanding Unit Award	1 July 2015 – 30 June 2017	451st Flying Training Squadron
	Air Force Outstanding Unit Award	1 July 2017 – 30 June 2019	451st Flying Training Squadron
	Air Force Outstanding Unit Award	1 July 2019 – 30 June 2021	451st Flying Training Squadron
	Air Force Outstanding Unit Award	26 August 2021 – 18 October 2021	451st Flying Training Squadron

Campaign Streamer	Campaign	Dates	Notes
	Air Offensive, Europe	14 May 1943–5 June 1944	451st Bombardment Squadron
	Air Combat, EAME Theater	14 May 1943–11 May 1945	451st Bombardment Squadron
	Normandy	6 June 1944–24 July 1944	451st Bombardment Squadron
	Northern France	25 July 1944–14 September 1944	451st Bombardment Squadron
	Rhineland	15 September 1944–21 March 1945	451st Bombardment Squadron
	Ardennes-Alsace	16 December 1944–25 January 1945	451st Bombardment Squadron
	Central Europe	22 March 1944–21 May 1945	451st Bombardment Squadron

== See also ==
- List of Martin B-26 Marauder operators
- List of F-86 Sabre units
- List of F-100 units of the United States Air Force

== Bibliography ==
- Anderson, Capt. Barry (1985). Army Air Forces Stations: A Guide to the Stations Where U.S. Army Air Forces Personnel Served in the United Kingdom During World War II (PDF). Maxwell AFB, AL yes: Research Division, USAF Historical Research Center. Archived from the original (PDF) on 23 January 2016.
- Johnson, 1st Lt. David C. (1988). U.S. Army Air Forces Continental Airfields (ETO) D-Day to V-E Day (PDF). Maxwell AFB, AL: Research Division, USAF Historical Research Center. Archived from the original (PDF) on 29 September 2015.
- Manning, Thomas A.; Aschcroft, Bruce A.; Emmons, Richard H.; Hussey, Ann K.; Mason, Joseph L. (2005). History of Air Education and Training Command, 1942–2002 (PDF). Randolph AFB, Texas: Office of History and Research, Headquarters, Air Education and Training Command. ASIN B000NYX3PC. ISBN 978-1376984057.
- Maurer, Maurer, ed. (1983) [1961]. Air Force Combat Units of World War II (PDF) (reprint ed.). Washington, DC: Office of Air Force History. ISBN 0-912799-02-1. LCCN 61060979. Archived from the original (PDF) on 20 December 2016.
- Mueller, Robert (1989). Air Force Bases, Vol. I, Active Air Force Bases Within the United States of America on 17 September 1982 (PDF). Washington, DC: Office of Air Force History. ISBN 0-912799-53-6.
- Maurer, Maurer, ed. (1982) [1969]. Combat Squadrons of the Air Force, World War II (PDF) (reprint ed.). Washington, DC: Office of Air Force History. ISBN 0-405-12194-6. LCCN 70605402. OCLC 72556. Archived from the original (PDF) on 20 December 2016.
- Ravenstein, Charles A. (1984). Air Force Combat Wings, Lineage & Honors Histories 1947–1977. Washington, DC: Office of Air Force History. ISBN 0-912799-12-9.
- Watkins, Robert (2008). Battle Colors. Vol. III Insignia and Markings of the Ninth Air Force in World War II. Atglen, PA: Shiffer Publishing Ltd. ISBN 978-0-7643-2938-8.
