= 435th Fighter Training Squadron =

435th Fighter Training Squadron

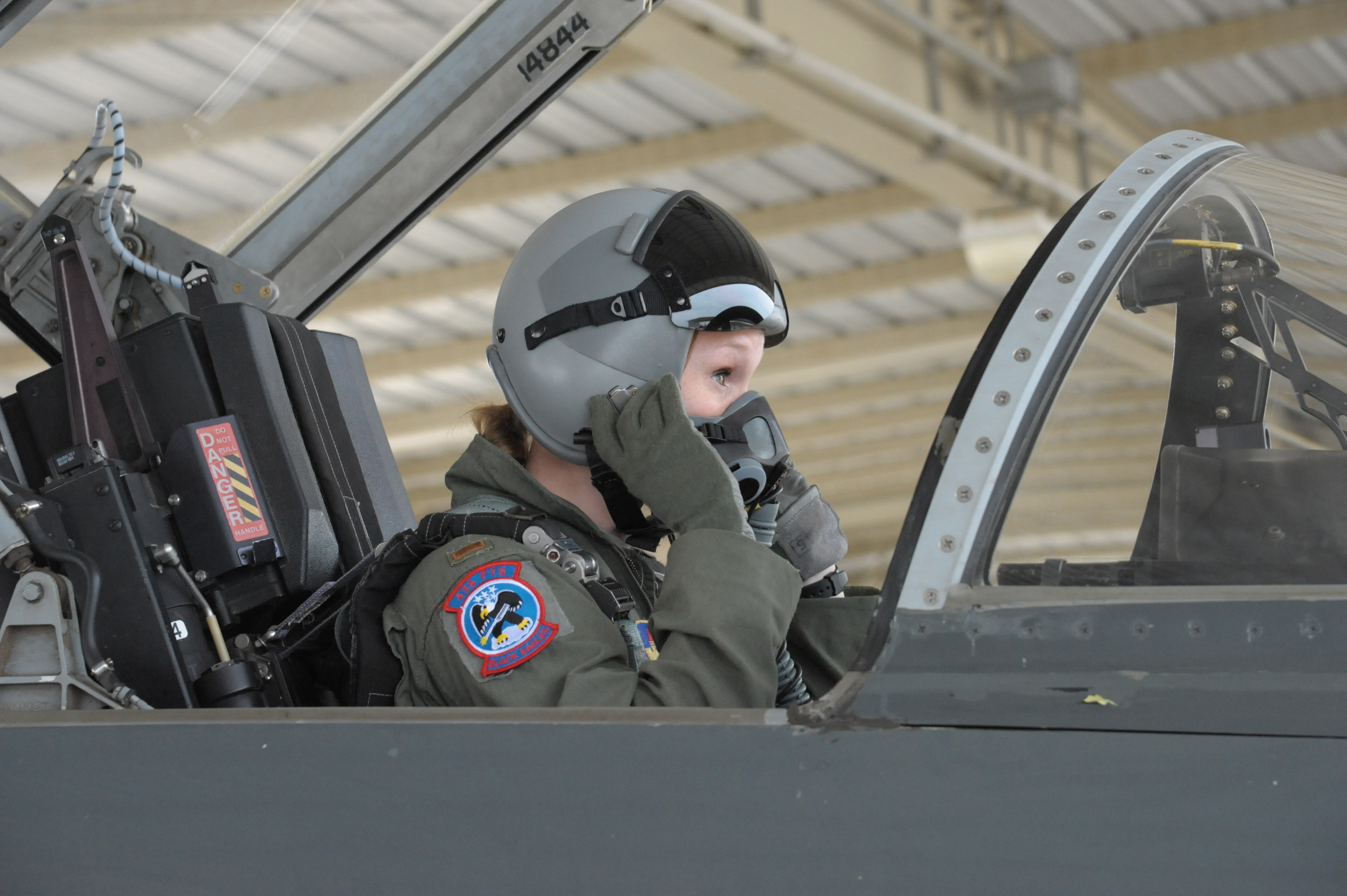
- A 435th Fighter Training Squadron fighter candidate adjusts her mask and helmet before a training flight
- Active: 1943–1945; 1952–1974; 1977–1991; 1993–1997; 1998–present
- Country: United States
- Branch: United States Air Force
- Role: Fighter Pilot Training
- Part of: Air Education and Training Command
- Garrison/HQ: Randolph Air Force Base
- Nickname(s): Deadly Black Eagles
- Motto(s): Establish Dominance
- Engagements: European Theater of Operations, Vietnam War
- Decorations: Distinguished Unit Citation; Presidential Unit Citation; Air Force Outstanding Unit Award with Combat "V" Device; Air Force Outstanding Unit Award; French Croix de Guerre with Palm; Republic of Vietnam Gallantry Cross with Palm

Commanders
- Current commander: Lt Col John "HoBS" Matchett

Insignia
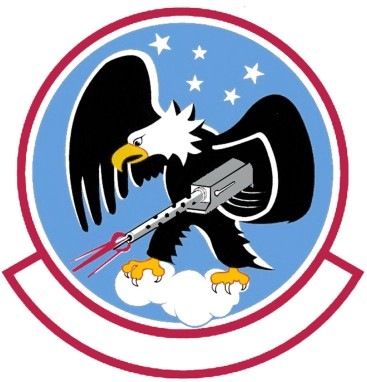
- 435th Fighter Training Squadron emblem (approved 20 March 1945)

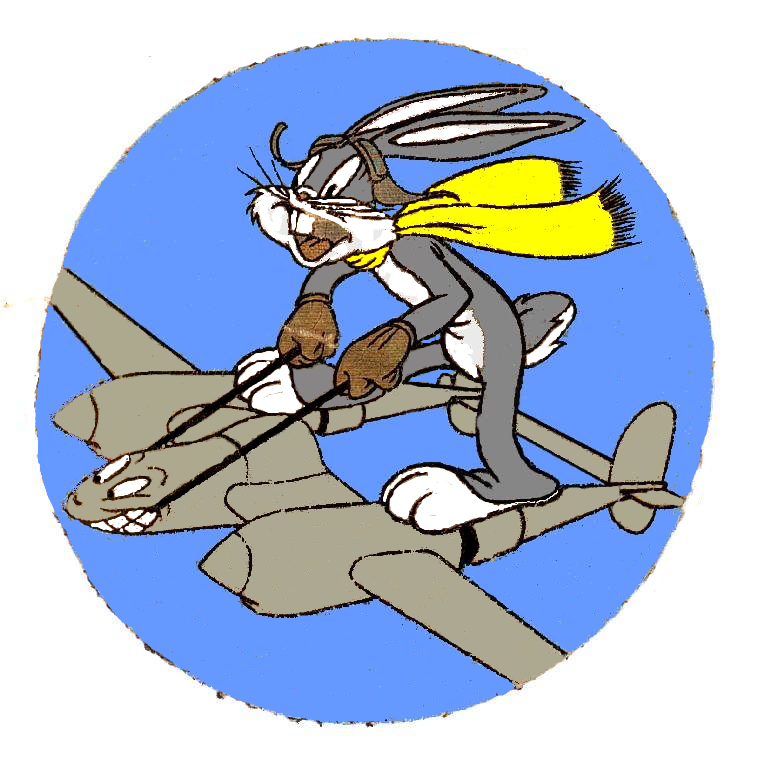
- 435th Fighter Sq emblem (approved 25 February 1944)

The 435th Fighter Training Squadron is part of the 12th Flying Training Wing based at Randolph Air Force Base, Texas. It operates Northrop AT-38 Talon aircraft conducting flight training.

== Mission ==
The 435 FTS conducts initial instructor and student flying training for over 130 U.S. Air Force and international pilots and Weapon System Operators annually in Introduction to Fighter Fundamentals. The squadron develops students' proficiency, confidence, discipline, judgment, and situational awareness of basic fighter employment. Additionally, the squadron deploys to support fighter syllabus/operational training requirements for Dissimilar Air Combat Training.

== History ==
=== World War II ===
The 435th flew air defense prior to overseas duty then flew combat in the European Theater of Operations from, 26 May 1944 – 25 April 1945.

=== Vietnam War ===
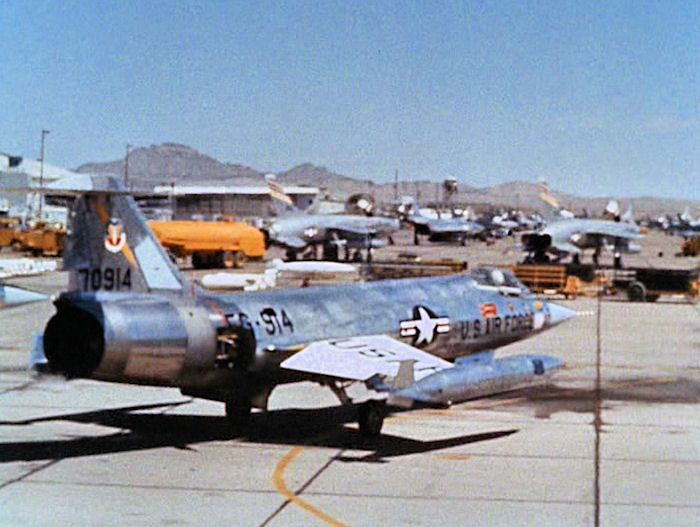
F-104C Starfighter, AF Ser. No. 57-0914, 435 TFS, 1965 George Air Force Base California. This aircraft was deployed to Ubon RTAFB, Thailand in 1966 and assigned to 8 TFW. It crashed due to engine failure over Thailand on 16 January 1967. This Film was used in the Opening teaser of the Star Trek series episode Tomorrow Is Yesterday.

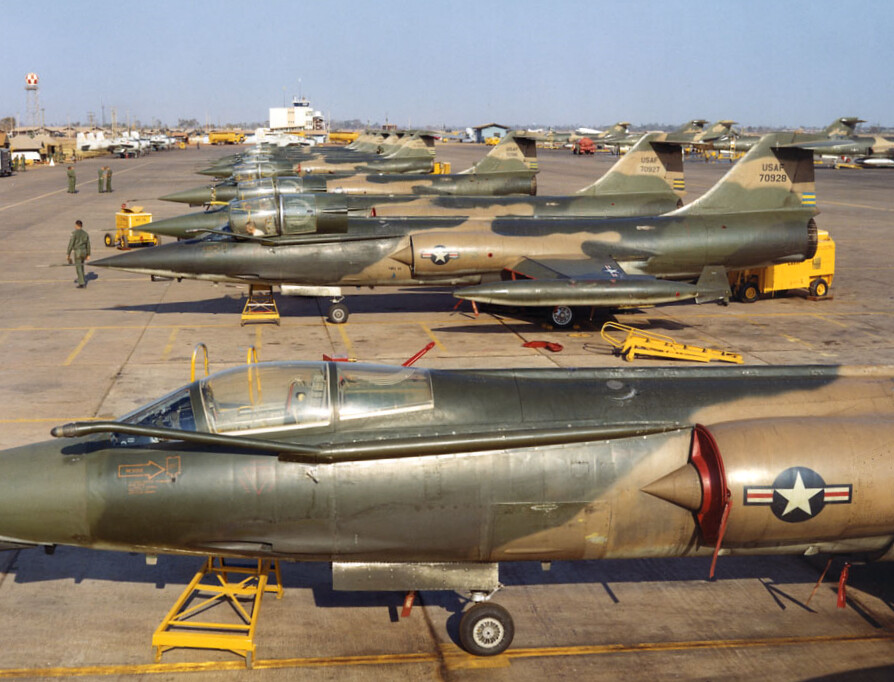
F-104s of the 435 TFS on the Da Nang flightline – 1965

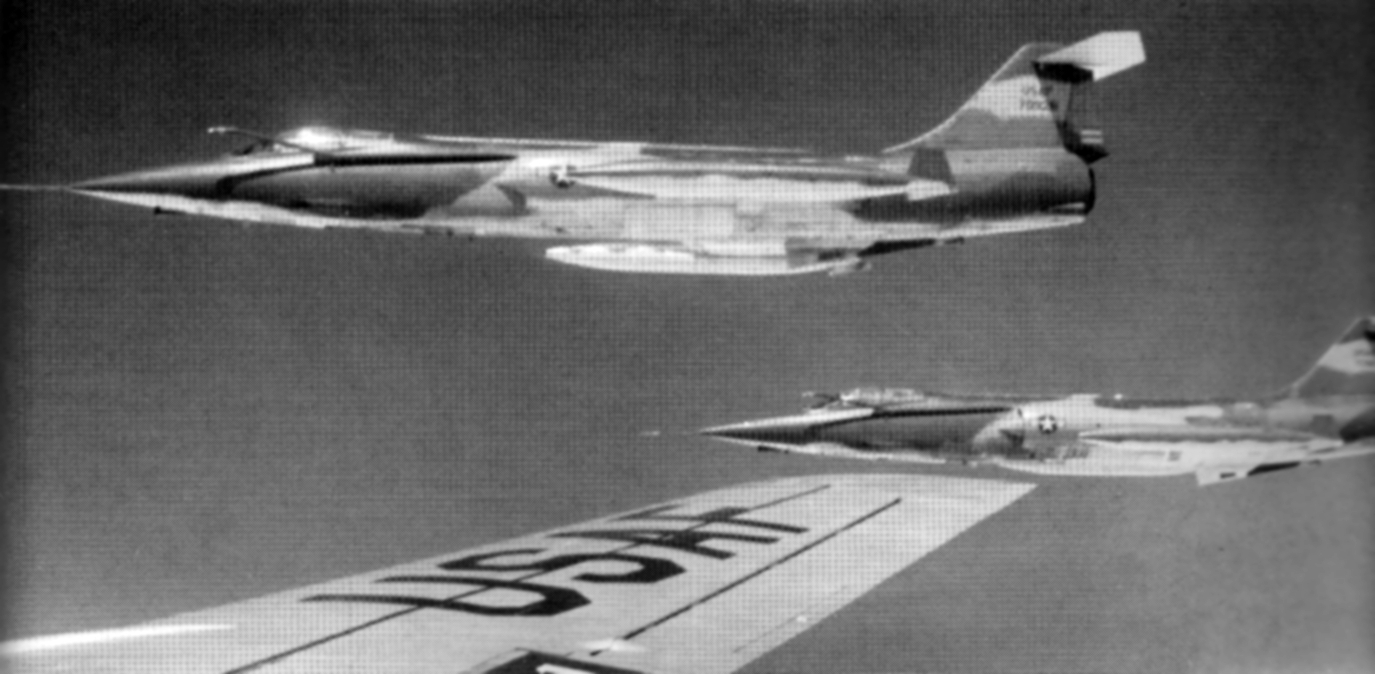
435th TFS F-104Cs over Southeast Asia, October 1966

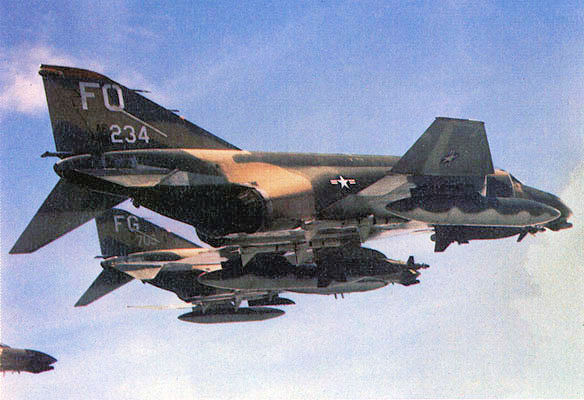
435th Tactical Fighter Squadron Phantom II (Note: Aircraft is McDonnell F-4D-29-MC Phantom II serial 66-234 with laser-guided bombs on a mission north. This aircraft survived the war and eventually was sent to the Aerospace Maintenance and Regeneration Center for scrapping 29 September 1989.)

A detachment operated under the 8th Tactical Fighter Wing detachment at Udorn RTAFB, Thailand, 5 Jun-c. 23 July 1966 It conducted air defense in Southeast Asia from, 12 October-20 December 1965 and combat sorties from, July 1966-15 August 1973.

=== Training ===
The squadron trained fighter pilots and weapon systems officers between January 1977 and February 1991. It conducted training for Taiwan Air Force pilots from, May 1993-c. 31 December 1995 and Introduction to Fighter Fundamentals training for international students from, 1998–2004.

== Lineage ==
- Constituted as the 435th Fighter Squadron (Two Engine) on 12 October 1943

Activated on 15 October 1943
Redesignated 435th Fighter Squadron, Single Engine on 5 September 1944
Inactivated on 15 December 1945

- Redesignated 435th Fighter-Bomber Squadron on 15 October 1952

Activated on 1 December 1952
Redesignated 435th Fighter-Day Squadron on 15 February 1954
Redesignated 435th Tactical Fighter Squadron on 1 July 1958
Inactivated 8 August 1974

- Redesignated 435th Tactical Fighter Training Squadron on 22 October 1976

Activated on 1 January 1977
Inactivated on 19 February 1991

- Redesignated 435th Fighter Squadron on 1 May 1993

Activated on 12 May 1993
Inactivated on 1 April 1997

- Redesignated 435th Flying Training Squadron on 2 April 1998

Activated on 14 May 1998

- Redesignated 435th Fighter Training Squadron on 19 May 2003

=== Assignments ===
- 479th Fighter Group, 15 October 1943
- VIII Fighter Command, 1–15 December 1945
- 479 Fighter-Bomber Group (later 479 Fighter-Day Group), 1 December 1952 (attached to Iceland Defense Force until 27 March 1953)

Attached to Air Proving Ground Command, 26 July–6 September 1955)

- 479th Fighter-Day Wing (later 479th Tactical Fighter Wing), 8 October 1957

Attached to

16th Air Force, 7 December 1960 – c. 15 April 1961
86th Air Division, 19 September 1961 – 22 January 1962, 17 October–c. 30 November 1962
65th Air Division, 15 December 1960 – 14 April 1961, 3 August–17 October 1962, 30 November–19 December 1962, 30 March–23 June 1964
2d Air Division, 12 October–20 December 1965

- 8th Tactical Fighter Wing, 24 July 1966 – 8 August 1974
- 479th Tactical Training Wing, 1 January 1977 – 19 February 1991
- 49th Operations Group, 12 May 1993 – 1 April 1997
- 12th Operations Group, 14 May 1998
- 479th Flying Training Group, 1 October 2001
- 12th Operations Group, 2 March 2007 – present)

=== Stations ===
- Grand Central Air Terminal, California, 15 October 1943
- Oxnard Airstrip, California, 6 February 1944
- Santa Maria Army Air Field, California, 6–15 April 1944
- RAF Wattisham (Station 377), England, 15 May 1944 – c. 9 December 1945
- Camp Kilmer, New Jersey, 14–15 December 1945
- George Air Force Base, California, 1 December 1952 – 19 July 1966

Deployed to:

Naval Air Station Keflavik, 1 December 1952 – 27 March 1953
North Auxiliary Airfield, South Carolina, 26 July–6 September 1955
Morón Air Base, Spain, 7 December 1960–c. 15 April 1961, 3 August–17 October 1962, c. 30 November–19 December 1962, 30 March–23 June 1964
Ramstein Air Base, Germany, 19 September 1961 – 22 January 1962
Hahn Air Base, Germany, 17 October–c. 30 November 1962
Da Nang Air Base, South Vietnam and Kung Kuan Air Base, Taiwan, 12 October–20 December 1965

- Udorn Royal Thai Air Force Base, Thailand, 24 July 1966
- Ubon Royal Thai Air Force Base, Thailand, 2 August 1967 – 8 August 1974
- Holloman Air Force Base, New Mexico, 1 January 1977 – 19 February 1991
- Holloman Air Force Base, New Mexico, 12 May 1993 – 1 April 1997
- Randolph Air Force Base, Texas, 14 May 1998
- Moody Air Force Base, Georgia, 2 October 2001
- Randolph Air Force Base (later Joint Base San Antonio-Randolph), Texas, 2 March 2007 – present)

=== Aircraft ===
- Lockheed P-38 Lightning (1943–1945)
- North American P-51 Mustang (1944–1945, 1952–1953)
- Republic P-47 Thunderbolt (1945)
- North American F-86 Sabre (1953–1955)
- North American F-100 Super Sabre (1954–1959)
- Lockheed F-104 Starfighter (1959–1967)
- McDonnell Douglas F-4 Phantom II (1967–1974)
- Northrop T-38 Talon (1977–1991, 1993–1997, 1998 – present)
