= Combat systems officer =

Flight member of an aircrew in the United States Air Force

United States Air Force Combat Systems Officer Wings

A combat systems officer (CSO) is a flight member of an aircrew in the United States Air Force and is the mission commander in many multi-crew aircraft. The combat systems officer manages the mission and integrates systems and crew with the aircraft commander to collectively achieve and maintain situational awareness and mission effectiveness. CSOs are trained in piloting, navigation, the use of the electromagnetic spectrum, and are experts in weapon system employment on their specific airframe. Aircrew responsibilities include mission planning, mission timing, weapons targeting and employment, threat reactions, aircraft communications, and hazard avoidance.

In 2006, USAF undergraduate CSOs began attending Initial Flight Training (IFT), a civilian contracted flight training operation under Air Education and Training Command (AETC) auspices, with their USAF undergraduate pilot counterparts at Pueblo Memorial Airport, Colorado, a program that replaced the previous Pilot Indoctrination Program (PIP) at the United States Air Force Academy (USAFA), the previous Flight Instruction Program (FIP) in Air Force Reserve Officer Training Corps (AFROTC), the former Centralized Flight Screening Program for Air Force Officer Training School (AFOTS) graduates (and later USAFA and AFROTC graduates following discontinuation of PIP and FIP) at Hondo Municipal Airport, Texas, and the former Cessna T-41 Mescalero phase in Undergraduate Pilot Training (UPT) that was discontinued in the early 1970s. Initial Flight Screening (IFS) has continued as previously established at Pueblo with the transition of USAF Navs to CSOs.

CSO training merges three previous USAF Undergraduate Navigator Training (UNT) tracks formerly known as the Navigator track, the weapon systems officer (WSO) track and the electronic warfare officer (EWO) track into one coherent training cycle in order to produce an aeronautically rated officer who is more versatile and able to adapt to all spectrums of an airframe. Parallel Navigator and WSO training tracks ended in 2009.

== CSO implementation ==
In 2009, most USAF Navigators still in an operational flying status, or due to rotate back to an operational flying assignment, transitioned to CSO. Under Air Force Instruction 36-402, rated USAF Navigators who do not transition to CSO are not eligible for advanced CSO ratings, e.g. Senior CSO and Master CSO.

Those USAF officers on active duty or on the Reserve Active Status List in the Air Force Reserve or Air National Guard who were designated as USAF Navigators prior to 30 Sep 1993, completed Undergraduate Navigator Training (UNT) and received their wings with the 323d Flying Training Wing (323 FTW) at Mather AFB, California.

With the BRAC-directed closure of Mather AFB, UNT was transferred to the 12th Flying Training Wing (12 FTW) at Randolph AFB, Texas in late 1993 and all USAF navigators except those destined for the B-1B and F-15E subsequently received their wings at that location. Concurrent with the move from Mather to Randolph, a parallel student USAF Navigators track was established for those officers desiring to become weapon systems officers (WSOs) in the B-1B and F-15E. These officer students proceeded to the U.S. Navy's Training Air Wing SIX at NAS Pensacola, Florida and followed a training track nearly identical to USN and USMC Student naval flight officers destined for tactical jet aircraft.

The separation between CSO candidates previously attending UNT with the 12th Flying Training Wing (12 FTW) at Randolph AFB until 2009, and those who attended a joint program with the U.S. Navy's Training Air Wing SIX (TRAWING 6) at NAS Pensacola, Florida was in the type of operational USAF aircraft the candidates would later fly:

- Navigators that graduated from Randolph AFB were eventually assigned to C-130 airlift; KC-135 aerial refueling; AC-130 and MC-130 special operations; HC-130P combat search and rescue; WC-130J weather reconnaissance; OC-135/WC-135/RC-135 reconnaissance; EC-130H Compass Call, EC-130J Commando Solo, E-3 AWACS or E-8 J-STARS electronic warfare; or B-52 Stratofortress bomber duties. Navigators trained via this track were also assigned to fly the E-4, the VC-25, and until its 2001 retirement, the VC-137. However, these latter three aircraft were not direct entry positions for recent flight school graduates and were/are crewed only by highly experienced navigators previously qualified in another aircraft.

- Navigators graduating from NAS Pensacola were assigned as weapon systems officers in the F-15E Strike Eagle strike fighter, the B-52 Stratofortress, or the Rockwell B-1B Lancer bomber after follow-on EWO training at Randolph AFB. With the USAF's retirement of the EF-111A Raven in 1998, a small number of USAF Navigators trained as EWOs would subsequently proceed to land-based U.S. Navy "expeditionary" electronic attack squadrons flying the EA-6B Prowler as a means of retaining a cadre of USAF EWOs in the tactical aviation arena.

With the establishment of the 479 FTG and UCSOT, the integrated training program with the U.S. Navy and U.S. Marine Corps at TRAWING 6 was discontinued. However, despite the divergence of USAF CSO training from student naval flight officer (NFO) training, all CSOs for all USAF aircraft model design series (MDS) now receive their training at NAS Pensacola. While some extant USAF MDS aircraft, such as the pure airlift variant of the C-130E are being retired, and the pure airlift version C-130J have eliminated the navigator/CSO position, all the other aforementioned extant MDS aircraft, as well as the HC-130J, MC-130J and WC-130J currently entering the inventory, continue to retain requirements for CSOs, thus ensuring the continued viability of the CSO career path.

Until its inactivation and closure in September 1993 due to Base Realignment and Closure (BRAC) action, all USAF undergraduate navigator training (UNT) took place with the former 323d Flying Training Wing at the former Mather AFB, California, utilizing the Boeing T-43A Bobcat and Cessna T-37 Tweet aircraft. In October 1993, training then shifted to the 12th Flying Training Wing at Randolph AFB, Texas, continuing at that location through 2009.

Prior to its disestablishment at Randolph AFB, the 562d Flying Training Squadron of the 12th Flying Training Wing (12 FTW) was responsible for training inflight navigation with the Raytheon T-1A Jayhawk and Boeing T-43A Bobcat aircraft, while the 563d Flying Training Squadron taught electronic warfare in an academic and simulator environment. The 563d Flying Training Squadron also incorporated the T-43A Bobcat and the T-1A Jayhawk in advanced CSO training. The T-43A has since been retired and all T-1A CSO training aircraft transferred to the 479 FTG at NAS Pensacola.

From 1994 until late 2009, a portion of USAF undergraduate navigator training took place at NAS Pensacola, integrated with the US Navy's student naval flight officer program under the aegis of Training Air Wing Six (TRAWING SIX) with USAF instructor navigators embedded in the wing and its squadrons. US Navy Training Squadron 4 (VT-4) and Training Squadron 10 (VT-10) conducted basic and intermediate flight training, initially the Raytheon T-34C Turbomentor until it was replaced by the T-6 Texan II, followed by training in the Raytheon T-1A Jayhawk and Rockwell T-39 Sabreliner. Training Squadron 86 (VT-86) then conducted advanced training in the T-39 and the Boeing T-45 Goshawk for student naval flight officers of the U.S. Navy, U.S. Marine Corps and numerous NATO/Allied and Coalition partner nations in addition to advanced USAF undergraduate navigator students destined for assignment as weapon systems officers in tactical aircraft. Prior to 2010, these USAF students destined for the F-15E Strike Eagle and the B-1B Lancer, as well as several USAF navigator flight instructors, were also fully integrated into these squadrons, with command of one squadron, VT-10, rotating between a USN commander who was a naval flight officer and a USAF lieutenant colonel who was a senior navigator or master navigator.

Starting in the summer of 2010, following completion of initial flight screening, all US Air Force CSO students began attending training at NAS Pensacola as the training squadrons at Randolph AFB closed down in accordance with the 2005 BRAC Committee findings. CSO students now fall under the 479th Flying Training Group with two training squadrons (451 FTS and 455 FTS), one operations support squadron (479 OSS) and one student squadron (479 STUS). Like the previous navigator training squadrons at Randolph AFB, the 479 FTG and its subordinate squadrons also fall under the control of the 12th Flying Training Wing (12 FTW) at Randolph AFB, albeit as a geographically separated unit (GSU) of the 12 FTW. The first CSO class (11-01) under the new syllabus started 5 May 2010, and graduated on 15 April 2011.

Upon completion of training, USAF CSOs receive basic CSO wings. At seven years of aeronautically rated service, they become eligible for the Senior CSO rating and at fifteen years the Master CSO rating, although an effort is underway to rename the Master CSO designation to Command CSO, standardizing same with their USAF Command Pilot counterparts. CSOs assigned to NASA crewed spaceflight programs are also eligible for CSO-Astronaut insignia at the Senior and Master level based upon their aeronautical rating at the time and completion of at least one spaceflight.

== CSO operational command ==
The rationale for the change in name from "Navigator" to "CSO" was based on the fact that USAF navigators, now known as CSOs, now serve as aircraft mission commanders and command operational combat flying squadrons, as well as operations groups and wings with an operational flying mission in the same manner as their USAF pilot counterparts. USAF navigators/combat systems officers at the general officer level have also begun serving in positions of increasing responsibility at the USAF major command (MAJCOM) and Unified Combatant Command level, up to and including commander of MAJCOMs and deputy commander of combatant commands. Bernard P. Randolph was the first navigator in 1987 to achieve a 4-star (O-10) rank who did not subsequently retrain as a USAF pilot, thought several have reached the 3-star (O-9) level, among them Bradley Heithold, former AFSOC commander.

== See also ==
- Aircrew (Flight crew)
- Weapon systems officer (CSO position on USAF F-15E, B-52H, and B-1B airframes)
