= 434th Flying Training Squadron =

US Army unit

434th Flying Training Squadron

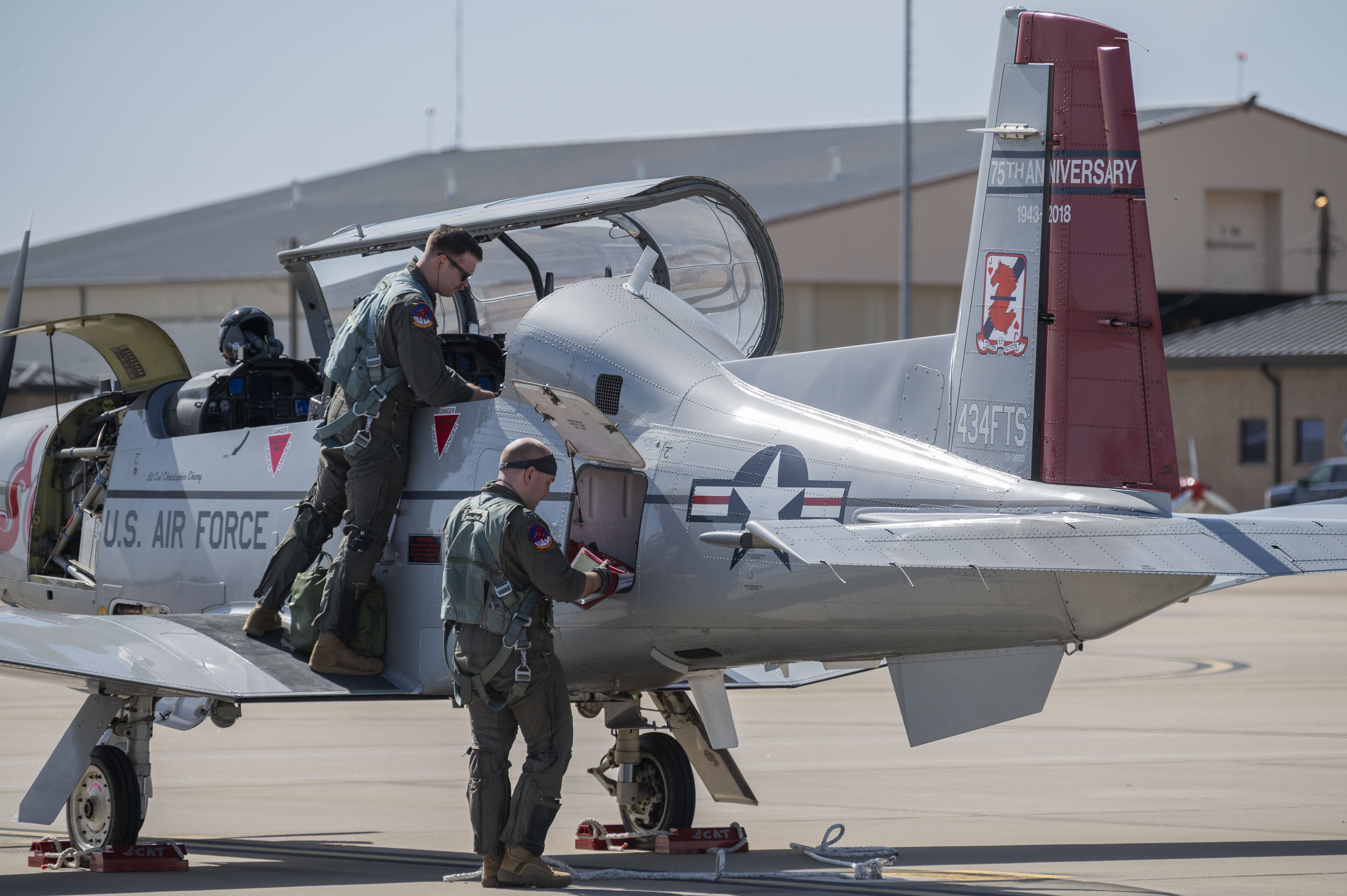
- 434th Flying Training Squadron T-6 Texan II
- Active: 1943–1945; 1952–1991; 2007–present
- Country: United States
- Branch: United States Air Force
- Role: Pilot Training
- Part of: Air Education and Training Command
- Garrison/HQ: Laughlin Air Force Base
- Mascot: Red Devils
- Engagements: European Theater of Operations
- Decorations: Distinguished Unit Citation; Air Force Outstanding Unit Award; French Croix de Guerre with Palm; Republic of Vietnam Gallantry Cross with Palm

Commanders
- Current commander: Lt Col Bendel "GOLD" Rushing

Insignia
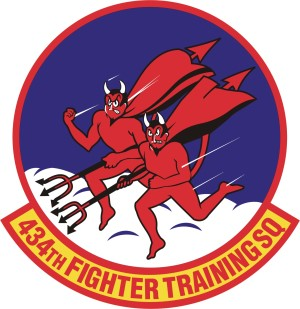
- 434th Fighter Training Squadron emblem

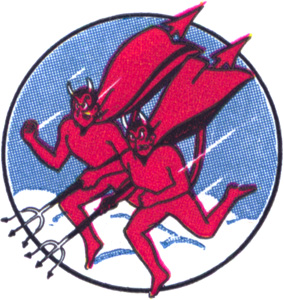
- 434th Fighter Squadron emblem (approved 7 July 1944)

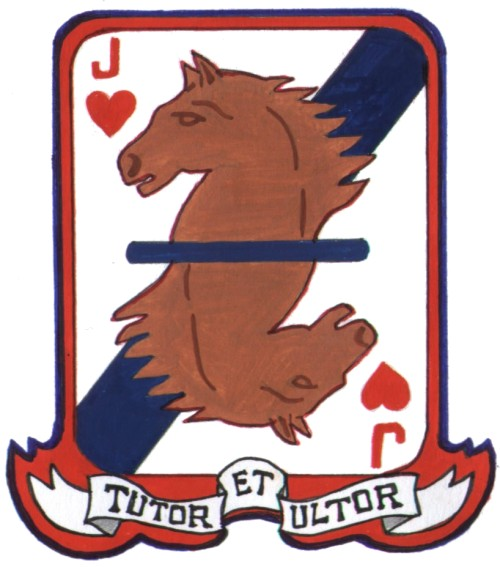
- Unofficial 434th Fighter Squadron emblem (P-51 era) (Note: This emblem was adopted when the squadron switched from Lightnings to Mustangs. Squadron members felt that the "Double Trouble" emblem was not appropriate for a single engine fighter squadron. Watkins, p. 91.)

The 434th Flying Training Squadron is part of the 47th Flying Training Wing based at Laughlin Air Force Base, Texas. It operates Beechcraft T-6 Texan II aircraft conducting flight training.

== History ==
=== World War II ===
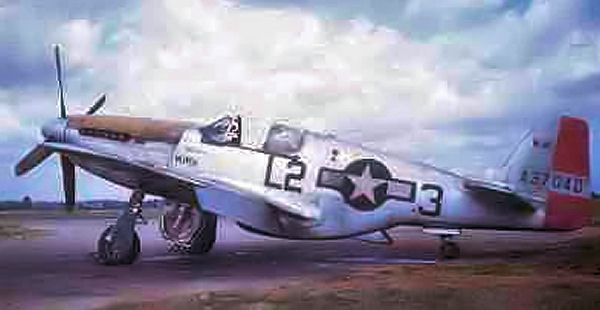
434th Fighter Squadron P-51B (Note: Aircraft is North American P-51B-5 Mustang Serial 42-7040 in June 1945. This P-51B was previously assigned to the 361st Fighter Group at RAF Bottisham and was a replacement for a low-hour P-51 reassigned from the group.)

The squadron was activated on 15 October 1943 at Grand Central Air Terminal. It was initially equipped with the Lockheed P-38F Lightning and trained for combat to serve as an air defense organization for the west coast as part of IV Fighter Command.

Even though the defense of the US west coast initially took priority, it was decided to deploy Lightning squadrons to Britain for heavy bomber escort duty. The squadron was assigned to VIII Fighter Command, Eighth Air Force and moved to RAF Wattisham, England, in April–May 1944.

From England, the squadron escorted heavy bombers during operations against targets on the Continent, strafed targets of opportunity, and flew fighter-bomber, counter-air, and area-patrol missions. Engaged primarily in Boeing B-17 Flying Fortress and Consolidated B-24 Liberator escort activities and fighter sweeps until the Normandy invasion in June 1944.

Patrolled the beachhead during the invasion. Strafed and dive-bombed troops, bridges, locomotives, railway cars, barges, vehicles, airfields, gun emplacements, flak towers, ammunition dumps, power stations, and radar sites while on escort or fighter-bomber missions as the Allies drove across France during the summer and fall of 1944. The unit flew area patrols to support the breakthrough at Saint-Lô in July and the airborne attack on the Netherlands in September. The unit continued escort and fighter-bomber activities from October to mid-December 1944. It converted to P-51s between 10 September and 1 October, using both types on missions until conversion was completed.

Participated in the Battle of the Bulge (December 1944 – January 1945) by escorting bombers to and from targets in the battle area and by strafing transportation targets while on escort duty. From February to April 1945 it continued to fly escort missions, but also provided area patrols to support the airborne attack across the Rhine in March. Returned to Camp Kilmer New Jersey in November 1945, and was inactivated in December 1945.

=== Cold War ===
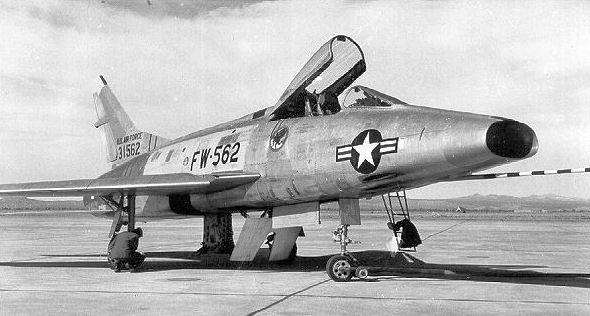
434th Fighter-Day Squadron F-100A, 1953 (Note: Aircraft is North American F-100A-10-NA Super Sabre serial 53-1562.)

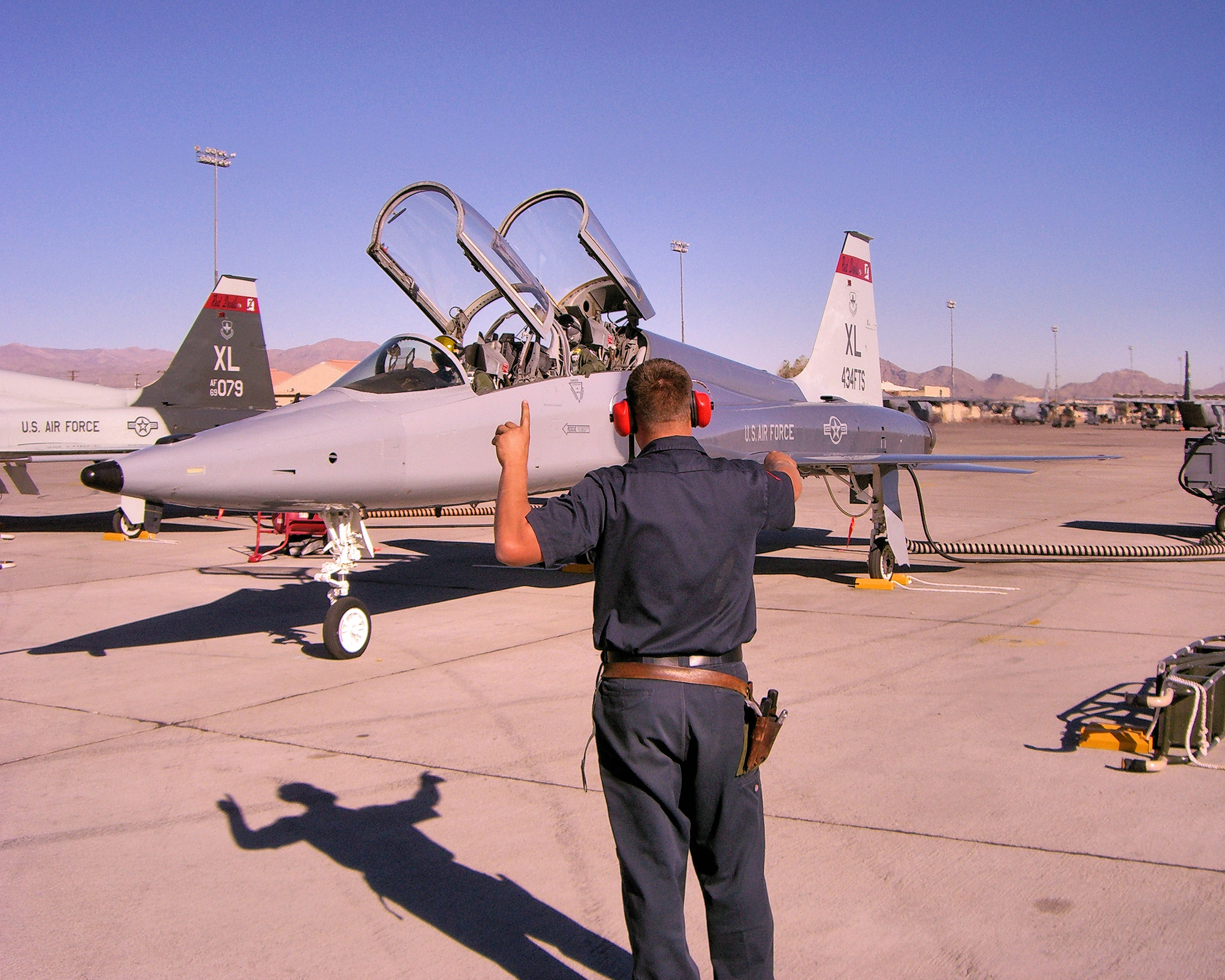
434th Fighter Training Squadron T-38 Talon, 2011

The squadron trained as fighter-day, and later, tactical fighter squadron from, 1952–1962. It was not manned from, 3 January 1962 – October 1966. In 1966, it began training McDonnell F-4 Phantom II crews for assignment in Southeast Asia. In August 1972, the squadron deployed to Thailand, where it served under operational control of 49th Tactical Fighter Wing. It engaged in combat over North and South Vietnam. It redeployed to the U.S. in October 1972. By 1975, the 434th provided combat aircrew training for U.S. and Allied pilots. From 1977 to 1991, the squadron trained pilots, weapon systems officers, and forward air controllers.

== Lineage ==
- Constituted as the 434th Fighter Squadron on 12 October 1943

Activated on 15 October 1943
Inactivated on 1 December 1945

- Redesignated 434th Fighter-Bomber Squadron on 15 October 1952

Activated on 1 December 1952
Redesignated 434th Fighter-Day Squadron on 15 February 1954
Redesignated 434th Tactical Fighter Squadron on 1 July 1958
Redesignated 434th Tactical Fighter Training Squadron on 1 October 1975
Inactivated on 3 May 1991

- Redesignated 434th Fighter Training Squadron on 21 June 2007

Activated on 19 July 2007
Redesignated 434th Flying Training Squadron on unknown date

=== Assignments ===
- 479th Fighter Group, 15 October 1943 – 1 December 1945
- 479th Fighter-Bomber Group (later 479th Fighter-Day Group), 1 December 1952
- 479th Fighter-Day Wing (later 479th Tactical Fighter Wing), 8 October 1957
- 35th Tactical Fighter Wing, 1 October 1971 (attached to 49th Tactical Fighter Wing, 12 August–6 October 1972)
- 479th Tactical Training Wing, 1 January 1977 – 3 May 1991
- 47th Operations Group, 19 July 2007 – present

=== Stations ===
- Grand Central Air Terminal, California, 15 October 1943
- Lomita Flight Strip, California, 6 February 1944
- Santa Maria Army Air Field, California, 8–18 April 1944
- RAF Wattisham (AAF-377), England, 15 May 1944 – c. 23 November 1945
- Camp Kilmer, New Jersey, 29 November–1 December 1945
- George Air Force Base, California, 1 December 1952

Deployed to Moron Air Base, Spain, 9 August–17 December 1961
Deployed to Ching Chuan Kang Air Base, Taiwan, April 1965 – February 1966
Deployed to Takhli Royal Thai Air Force Base, Thailand, 12 August–6 October 1972

- Holloman Air Force Base, New Mexico, 1 January 1977 – 3 May 1991
- Laughlin Air Force Base, Texas, 19 July 2007 – present

=== Aircraft ===
- Lockheed P-38 Lightning (1943–1944)
- North American F-51 Mustang (1944–1945, 1952–1953)
- Republic P-47 Thunderbolt (1945)
- North American F-86 Sabre (1953–1955)
- North American F-100 Super Sabre (1954–1959)
- Lockheed F-104 Starfighter (1959–1962)
- McDonnell F-4 Phantom II (1966–1976)
- Northrop T-38 Talon (1977–1991, 2007–2012)
- Beechcraft T-6 Texan II (2012 – present)
