= 323d Air Expeditionary Wing =

323d Air Expeditionary Wing

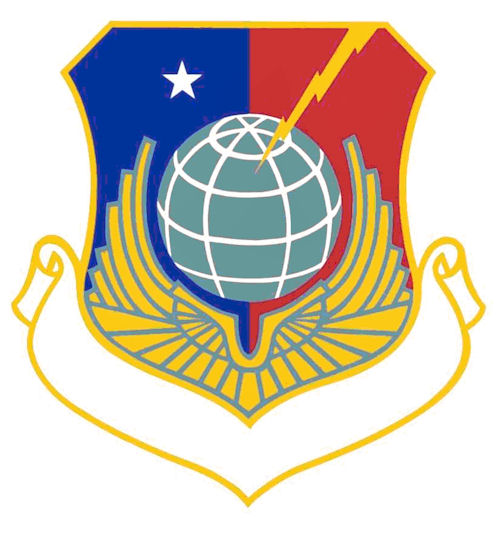
- Emblem of the 323rd Air Expeditionary Wing
- Active: 1949–1951; 1955–1957; 1973–1993; 2008
- Country: United States
- Branch: United States Air Force
- Part of: United States Air Forces in Europe

The 323rd Air Expeditionary Wing is a provisional United States Air Force unit assigned to the United States Air Forces in Europe. As a provisional unit, it may be activated or inactivated at any time.

It was last known to be active from 14 March – 30 April 2008 at Balotești, Romania, serving briefly as the USAF headquarters for a NATO Summit.

During World War II, the group's predecessor unit, the 323rd Bombardment Group (Medium) was a Martin B-26 Marauder bombardment group assigned to the Eighth and later Ninth Air Force.

== History ==
=== Air Force Reserve ===
The wing was first activated as the 323rd Bombardment Wing at Tinker Air Force Base, Oklahoma in June 1949 when Continental Air Command implemented the wing base organization for its reserve units, uniting support organizations and the 323rd Bombardment Group under a single headquarters.

The wing was ordered to active duty on 10 March 1951 as a result of the Korean War. Its personnel and equipment were used as fillers for other units and it was inactivated on 17 March 1951.

=== 323rd Fighter-Bomber Wing ===
The wing was reactivated at Bunker Hill Air Force Base, Indiana on 8 August 1955 and assigned to Tactical Air Command's Ninth Air Force. Initially training with North American F-86Fs, these were quickly upgraded to the North American F-86H Sabre and then to the North American F-100A/D Super Sabre in 1956 to become proficient in tactical air operations. Operational squadrons were the 453rd Fighter Bomber Squadron, 454th Fighter Bomber Squadron and 455th Fighter Bomber Squadron.

The wing's aircraft wore a band on the tail and around the nose edged with small black checkers.

In 1955, Strategic Air Command (SAC) began stationing units at the base and the Eighth Air Force claimed jurisdiction of Bunker Hill AFB in September 1957. With the turnover of the base from TAC to SAC, the 323rd was phased down and replaced by SAC's 401st Air Base Group on 1 September 1957.

=== 323d Flying Training Wing ===
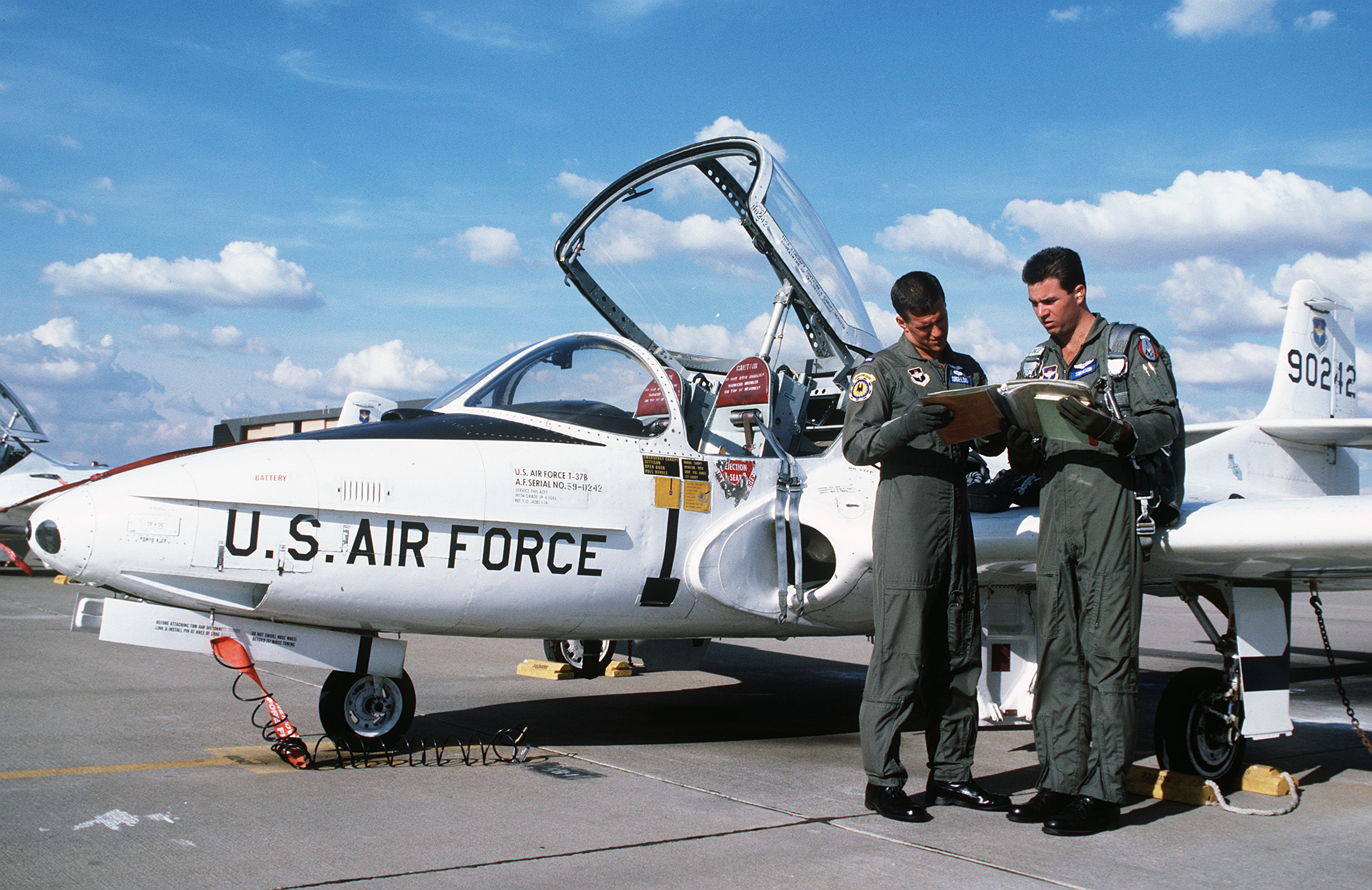
A 323rd FTW instructor briefing a student before flight

The 323d was reactivated as the 323d Flying Training Wing (323 FTW), an Air Training Command (ATC) undergraduate navigator training (UNT) wing at Mather Air Force Base, California on 1 April 1973, replacing the 3535th Navigator Training Wing which had existed at Mather since 1946. As the sole navigator training wing for the entire Air Force, the wing also conducted advanced training for newly winged navigators slated for subsequent as navigator-bombardiers and electronic warfare officers in B-52, FB-111, B-1, EF-111 and RC-135 aircraft as well as weapon systems officers in F-4 Wild Weasel variants. The following operational squadrons were redesignated as a flying training squadrons as result of the 323rd's reactivation: 449th Flying Training Squadron, 450th Flying Training Squadron, 451st Flying Training Squadron, 452d Flying Training Squadron and the 432d Flying Training Squadron.

The 323d also operated Mather as the "host" wing for the installation while SAC's 320th Bombardment Wing and the Air Force Reserve's SAC-gained 940th Air Refueling Group, later 940th Air Refueling Wing, were "tenant" wings. The 323d also had responsibility for publishing Navigator magazine, a USAF-wide professional publication. The 323 FTW also conducted operational test and evaluation of the T-43A aircraft from 1 August 1973 – 31 October 1973 and began conversion from the T-29 to the T-43 shortly afterwards. As the only USAF flight training school teaching air navigation, the wing served not only the active duty USAF, but also the Air National Guard, the Air Force Reserve and friendly foreign nations.

With the decommissioning of the U.S. Navy's Training Squadron TWENTY-NINE (VT-29) at NAS Corpus Christi, TX in 1975, the 323 FTW also began training U.S. Navy student Naval Flight Officers destined for land-based naval aircraft, NATO/Allied student naval flight officers under U.S. Navy responsibility also destined for land-based maritime aircraft, and U.S. Coast Guard enlisted navigators for that service's HC-130 aircraft starting in July 1976. Instructor Naval Flight Officers, mostly from the Navy's Lockheed P-3 Orion community, were administratively assigned to Naval Air Training Unit Mather (NAVAIRTU Mather) and embedded in the 323 FTW, teaching USAF, USN and NATO/Allied students.

Support of the Marine Aerial Navigation School (MANS) for U.S. Marine Corps enlisted KC-130 navigators also began in July 1976 when MANS moved from NAS Corpus Christi to Mather AFB. However, MANS conducted its own navigation training independently.

In view of this influx of naval personnel, Naval Air Training Unit Mather (NAVAIRTU Mather) was established in 1976 under the Chief of Naval Air Training. In order to place the Navy organization on par with the 323d commander, a USN Captain or Captain-selectee naval flight officer who had already had been the commanding officer of an operational combat P-3 squadron was placed as the commanding officer of NAVAIRTU Mather, with administrative claimancy over all naval personnel (students, instructors and support staff) assigned to the 323d.

The 323d began training female USAF navigators in March 1977 and female USN Naval Flight Officers (NFO) in 1981. Female USAF instructor navigators followed in the 1983–84 time frame. In 1986, LT Kathryn P. Hire, USN, a former navigator and aircraft mission commander in the RP-3D Orion oceanographic research aircraft, became the first female USN NFO Instructor in the 323 FTW. Of note is that in 1993, then-LCDR Hire would become the first female assigned to the combat version of the P-3C Orion, and as a CDR and CAPT, would become a NASA mission specialist astronaut, flying the STS-90 mission in 1998 and the STS-130 mission in 2010.

On 15 December 1991, the 323d implemented the objective wing concept and the 449th, 450th, 451st, 452d and 432d FTSs were transferred to the new 323d Operations Group, and as well as reorganized into single aircraft type squadrons. All T-43As were assigned to the 445 FTS and T-37Bs to the 455 FTS. On 1 July 1993, following the disestablishment of the Air Training Command, the wing was assigned to the new Air Education and Training Command (AETC).

Under AETC, the T-43 and T-37 aircraft assigned to the 445th and 455th FTSs were assigned tail codes of "NT", but due to the Base Realignment and Closure (BRAC)-directed closure of Mather on 30 September 1993, the 323 FTW was inactivated on 1 October 1993.

With the wing's inactivation, its mission and most of its T-43 aircraft were reassigned to the 12th Flying Training Wing (12 FTW) and the 558th Flying Training Squadron (558 FTS) at Randolph Air Force Base, Texas. Because of the presence of T-37B aircraft at Randolph AFB for T-37 Pilot Instructor Training, the Mather T-37s were sent to long-term storage at AMARC at Davis–Monthan Air Force Base, Arizona.

=== Expeditionary operations ===
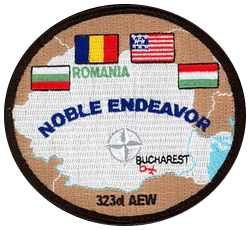
Patch of the 323d AEW during Operation Noble Endeavor

The Wing was provisionally activated at Balotești in Romania from 14 March to 30 April 2008. It supported Operation Noble Endeavor, a Romanian-led mission to police the skies above the NATO summit in Bucharest. The 323d directed the deployment of KC-135 Stratotankers, F-15C and F-15E Strike Eagles, E-3 Sentries, and F-16 Fighting Falcons to locations across eastern Europe, augmenting the Romanian Air Force efforts. The deployment also involved coordinating support, maintenance, operations, and medical personnel.

As part of the operation, the 492d and 493rd Fighter Squadrons were assigned to the 404th Air Expeditionary Group, with the 492d deploying to the Câmpia Turzii Air Base in Romania, and the 493rd deploying to the Graf Ignatievo Air Base in Bulgaria. To support the two fighter squadrons, the 712th Expeditionary Air Refueling Squadron assigned to the 398th Air Expeditionary Group was deployed to the Budapest International Airport in Hungary. The fighters were kept on 24-hour alert for the duration of the summit and conducted combat air patrols over Bucharest for the three days of the summit.

== Lineage ==
- Established as the 323d Bombardment Wing, Light on 10 May 1949

Ordered to active duty on 10 March 1951
Inactivated on 17 March 1951

- Redesignated 323d Fighter-Bomber Wing on 9 May 1955

Activated on 8 August 1955
Inactivated on 1 September 1957

- Redesignated 323d Flying Training Wing on 28 July 1972

Activated on 1 April 1973
Inactivated on 1 October 1993

- Redesignated as 323d Air Expeditionary Wing and converted to provisional status 25 March 2003

Activated 14 March 2008
Inactivated 30 April 2008

=== Assignments ===
- Twelfth Air Force, 27 June 1949
- Fourteenth Air Force, 1 July 1950 – 17 March 1951
- Ninth Air Force, 8 August 1955 – 1 September 1957
- Air Training Command, 1 April 1973
- Air Education and Training Command, 1 July – 1 October 1993
- United States Air Forces in Europe 25 March 2003
- 16th Air Expeditionary Task Force, 14 March – 30 April 2008

=== Components ===
Groups

- 323d Bombardment Group (later 323d Fighter-Bomber Group, 323d Operations Group), 27 June 1949 – 17 March 1951, 8 August 1955 – 1 September 1957, 15 December 1991 – 1 October 1993
- 386th Fighter-Bomber Group, 8 April 1956 – 9 April 1957 (Attached)
- 398th Air Expeditionary Group, 14 March – 30 April 2008
- 404th Air Expeditionary Group, 14 March – 30 April 2008

Squadrons

- 449th Flying Training Squadron: 1 April 1973 – 15 December 1991
- 450th Flying Training Squadron: 1 April 1973 – 15 December 1991
- 451st Flying Training Squadron: 1 April 1973 – 15 December 1991
- 452d Flying Training Squadron: 1 April 1973 – 15 December 1991
- 453d Flying Training Squadron: 1 April 1973 – 15 December 1991
- 454th Flying Training Squadron: 1 April 1973 – 15 December 1991
- 455th Flying Training Squadron: 1 April 1973 – 15 December 1991
- 492d Fighter Squadron: 14 March – 30 April 2008
- 493rd Fighter Squadron: 14 March – 30 April 2008
- 712th Expeditionary Air Refueling Squadron: 14 March – 30 April 2008

=== Stations ===
- Tinker Air Force Base, Oklahoma, 27 June 1949 – 28 March 1951
- Bunker Hill Air Force Base, Indiana, 8 August 1955 – 1 September 1957
- Mather Air Force Base, California, 1 April 1973 – 30 September 1993
- Balotești, Romania, 14 March – 30 April 2008

=== Aircraft ===
- Douglas B-26 Invader (1949–1951)
- North American F-86 Sabre (1955–1957)
- North American F-100 Super Sabre (1956–1957)
- Convair T-29 (1973–1974)
- Boeing T-43 (1973–1993)
- Cessna T-37 Tweet (1973–1993)
