= 494th Bombardment Squadron =

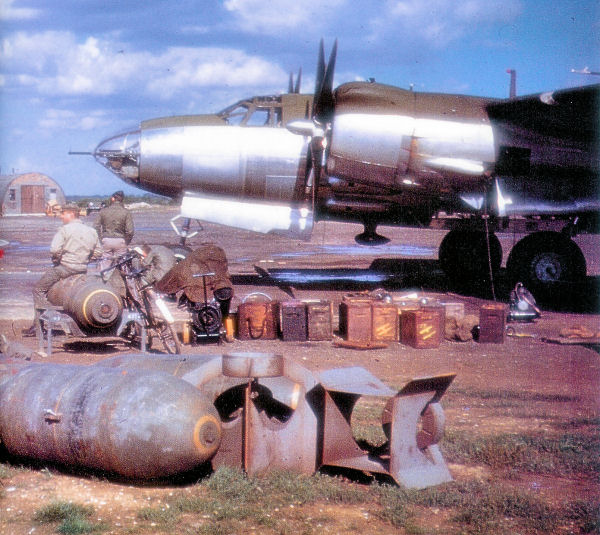
- 344th Group Martin B-26 Marauders at RAF Stansted Mountfitchet
- Active: 1942-1946
- Country: United States
- Branch: United States Air Force
- Role: Medium bomber
- Engagements: European Theater of Operations
- Decorations: Distinguished Unit Citation

Insignia
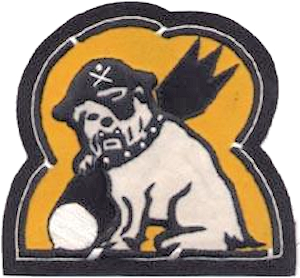
- 494th Bombardment Squadron emblem (Note: Approved 7 July 1944. Description: On an irregular-shaped orange figure, broken outline black, a white English bulldog, outlined black, seated on base line of figure, wearing a spiked collar, pirate's hat, and eye patch over left eye, of the last [color]; a large black aerial bomb with white nose resting on dexter base line and supported by right forepaw of bulldog.)
- Fuselage code: K9

The 494th Bombardment Squadron is an inactive United States Air Force unit, which was assigned to the 344th Bombardment Group, The squadron was activated in September 1942, and until July 1943 served as a Replacement Training Unit. It then began training for combat operations, deploying to the European Theater of Operations in January 1944. It participated in combat, earning a Distinguished Unit Citation for air support of ground troops during Operation Cobra. After V-E Day, the squadron became part of the occupation forces until it was inactivated on 31 March 1946.

== History ==
=== Training in the United States ===
The squadron was activated in September 1942 at MacDill Field, Florida as one of the original squadrons of the 344th Bombardment Group. In December, the group moved to nearby Drane Field, Florida. The unit served as a Replacement Training Unit (RTU) for Martin B-26 Marauders. RTUs were oversized units that trained individual pilots or aircrews prior to their deployment to overseas theaters.

In July 1943, the squadron stopped training other crews and began training to enter combat. It completed its training at Hunter Field, Georgia, and departed for the European Theater of Operations on 26 January 1944.

=== Combat in Europe ===
The squadron arrived at its first combat station, RAF Stansted Mountfitchet on 8 February 1944. It began operations with IX Bomber Command in March. It attacked targets in France, Belgium and the Netherlands, including airfields, marshalling yards, submarine pens and coastal defenses. After a poor bombing performance by the 344th Group on 10 April, the group was taken off operations for a week for additional training. It returned to operations, participating in Operation Crossbow, the attacks on V-1 flying bomb and V-2 rocket launch sites. Starting in May, it concentrated on attacks on bridges in France, preparing for Operation Overlord, the forthcoming invasion in Normandy.

On D Day, 6 June 1944, it attacked coastal batteries at Cherbourg. During the remainder of the month it supported the drive to seize the Cotentin Peninsula and bombed German defensive positions to support British forces near Caen. On 24 July, the squadron attacked a bridge across the Loire near Tours. An intense flak barrage dispersed the lead flight of the 344th Group, but the remainder of the formation held and destroyed the bridge. It attacked troop concentrations the next day and supply dumps on 26 July to assist advancing ground forces in Operation Cobra, the breakout at Saint Lo. For these actions, it was awarded a Distinguished Unit Citation.

It knocked out bridges to hinder German forces' withdrawal through the Falaise Gap and bombed strong points and vessels in the harbor of Brest in July and August. For the next two months, it concentrated on attacking rail lines, bridges, supply dumps and ordnance depots in Germany, moving to the European Continent and Cormeilles-en-Vexin Airfield, France in September. From December through January 1945, it supported ground forces in the Battle of the Bulge. Until April 1945, it continued combat operations against supply points, communications centers, marshalling yards, roads, and oil storage centers. The squadron flew its last mission on 25 April, an attack on Erding Airfield.

=== Occupation duty and return to the United States ===
Following V-E Day, the squadron flew training flights and participated in air demonstrations. It moved to Schleissheim Airfield, near Munich, in September as part of the United States Air Forces in Europe's occupation forces. There, the squadron began training on the Douglas A-26 Invader, but continued to fly Marauders as well. On 15 February 1946, the squadron's personnel and aircraft were withdrawn and it moved on paper to Bolling Field, District of Columbia, where it inactivated at the end of March.

== Lineage ==
- Constituted as the 494th Bombardment Squadron (Medium) on 31 August 1942

Activated on 8 September 1942
Redesignated 494th Bombardment Squadron, Medium in 1944
Redesignated 494th Bombardment Squadron, Light on 3 December 1945
Inactivated on 31 March 1946

=== Assignments ===
- 344th Bombardment Group, 8 September 1942 – 31 March 1946

=== Stations ===
- MacDill Field, Florida, 8 September 1942
- Drane Field, Florida, 28 December 1942
- Hunter Field, Georgia, 28 December 1943 – 26 January 1944
- RAF Stansted Mountfitchet (AAF-169), England, 8 February 1944
- Cormeilles-en-Vexin Airfield (A-59), France, 30 September 1944
- Florennes/Juzaine Airfield (A-78), Belgium, 4 April 1945
- Schleissheim Airfield (R-75), Germany, 15 September 1945 – 15 February 1946
- Bolling Field, District of Columbia, 15 February 1946 – 31 March 1946

=== Aircraft ===
- Martin B-26 Marauder, 1942–1946
- Douglas A-26 Invader, 1945–1946

=== Awards and campaigns ===
Award streamer	Award	Dates	Notes
	Distinguished Unit Citation	24–26 July 1944	France

Campaign Streamer	Campaign	Dates	Notes
	Air Offensive, Europe	8 February 1944–5 June 1944	
	Air Combat, EAME Theater	8 February 1944–11 May 1945	
	Normandy	6 June 1944–24 July 1944	
	Northern France	25 July 1944–14 September 1944	
	Rhineland	15 September 1944–21 March 1945	
	Ardennes-Alsace	16 December 1944–25 January 1945	
	Central Europe	22 March 1944–21 May 1945	

== See also ==
- List of Martin B-26 Marauder operators
- List of A-26 Invader operators
