= 497th Bombardment Squadron =

American military unit

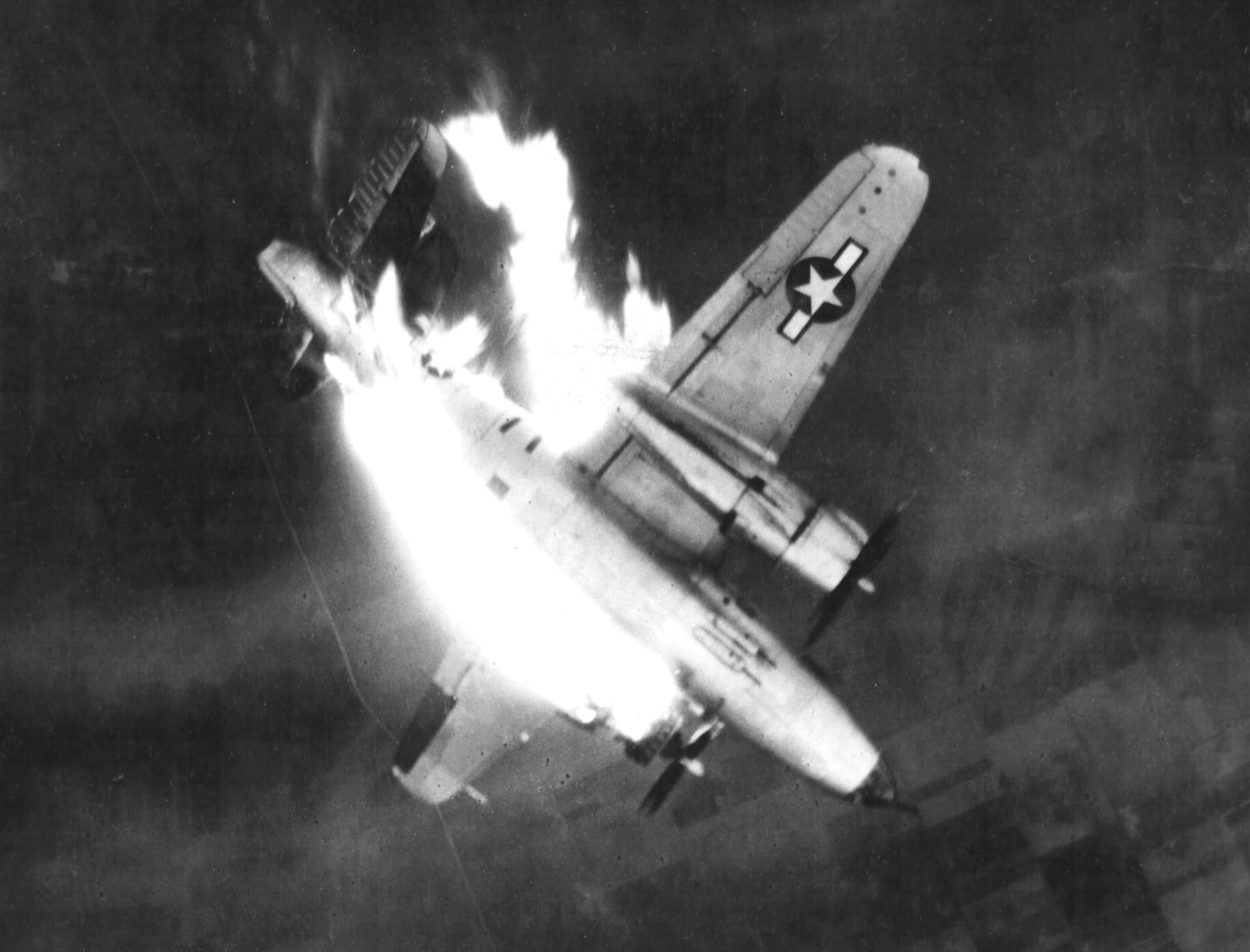
- Squadron Martin B-26 Marauder after enemy flak scored a direct hit on left engine (Note: Aircraft is Martin B-26G-11-MA Marauder, serial 43-34565. The plane was attacking an enemy communications center at Erkelenz, Germany on 26 February 1945. Missing Aircrew Report 12649.)
- Active: 1942-1945
- Country: United States
- Branch: United States Air Force
- Role: Medium bomber
- Engagements: European Theater of Operations
- Decorations: Distinguished Unit Citation

Insignia
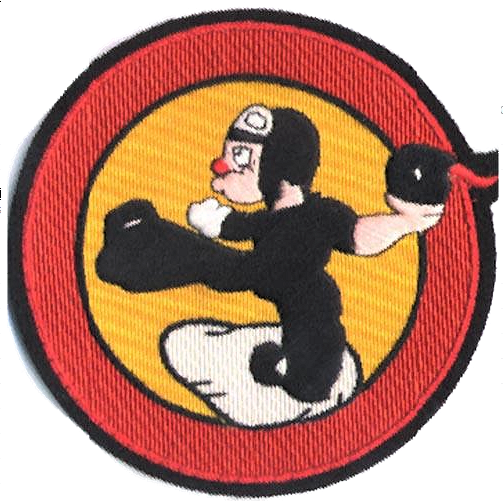
- Patch with 497th Bombardment Squadron emblem (Note: Approved 15 May 1943. Description: Over and through a yellow disc, wide border red, a caricatured figure in khaki flight suit, brown shoes and helmet, white goggles, balancing on right foot on white cloud formation in base, and throwing a round, black fire bomb with the right hand.)
- Fuselage code: 7I

The 497th Bombardment Squadron is an inactive United States Air Force unit, which was assigned to the 344th Bombardment Group. The squadron was activated in September 1942, and until July 1943 served as a Replacement Training Unit. It then began training for combat operations, deploying to the European Theater of Operations in January 1944. It participated in combat, earning a Distinguished Unit Citation for air support of ground troops during Operation Cobra. After V-E Day, the squadron became part of the occupation forces until it was inactivated on 30 December 1945.

== History ==
=== Training in the United States ===
The squadron was activated in September 1942 at MacDill Field, Florida as one of the four squadrons of the 344th Bombardment Group. In December, the group moved to nearby Drane Field, Florida. At Drane, the unit served as a Replacement Training Unit (RTU) for Martin B-26 Marauders. RTUs were oversized units that trained individual pilots or aircrews prior to their deployment to overseas theaters.

In July 1943, the squadron stopped training other crews and began training to enter combat. It completed its training at Hunter Field, Georgia, and departed for the European Theater of Operations on 26 January 1944.

=== Combat in Europe ===
The squadron arrived at its first combat station, RAF Stansted Mountfitchet, on 8 February 1944. It began operations with IX Bomber Command in March. It attacked targets in France, Belgium and the Netherlands, including airfields, marshalling yards, submarine pens and coastal defenses. After a poor bombing performance by the 344th Group on 10 April, the group was taken off operations for a week for additional training. It returned to operations, participating in Operation Crossbow, the attacks on V-1 flying bomb and V-2 rocket launch sites. Starting in May, it concentrated on attacks on bridges in France, preparing for Operation Overlord, the forthcoming invasion in Normandy.

On D Day, 6 June 1944, it attacked coastal batteries at Cherbourg. During the remainder of the month it supported the drive to seize the Cotentin Peninsula and bombed German defensive positions to support British forces near Caen. On 24 July, the squadron attacked a bridge across the Loire near Tours. An intense flak barrage dispersed the lead flight of the 344th Group, but the remainder of the formation held and destroyed the bridge. It attacked troop concentrations the next day and supply dumps on 26 July to assist advancing ground forces in Operation Cobra, the breakout at Saint Lo. For these actions, it was awarded a Distinguished Unit Citation.

It knocked out bridges to hinder German forces' withdrawal through the Falaise Gap and bombed strong points and vessels in the harbor of Brest in July and August. For the next two months, it concentrated on attacking rail lines, bridges, supply dumps and ordnance depots in Germany, moving to the European Continent and Cormeilles-en-Vexin Airfield, France in September. From December through January 1945, it supported ground forces in the Battle of the Bulge. Until April 1945, it continued combat operations against supply points, communications centers, marshalling yards, roads, and oil storage centers. The squadron flew its last mission on 25 April, an attack on Erding Airfield.

=== Occupation duty ===
Following V-E Day, the squadron flew training flights and participated in air demonstrations. It moved to Schleissheim Airfield, near Munich, Germany in September as part of the United States Air Forces in Europe's occupation forces. There, the squadron was inactivated on 30 December 1945, as the 344th Group reduced from four to three squadrons.

== Lineage ==
- Constituted as the 497th Bombardment Squadron (Medium) on 31 August 1942

Activated on 8 September 1942
Redesignated 497th Bombardment Squadron, Medium by 1944
Inactivated on 30 December 1945

=== Assignments ===
- 344th Bombardment Group, 8 September 1942 – 30 December 1945

=== Stations ===
- MacDill Field, Florida, 8 September 1942
- Drane Field, Florida, 28 December 1942
- Hunter Field, Georgia, 19 December 1943- 26 January 1944
- RAF Stansted Mountfitchet (AAF-169), England, 11 February 1944
- Cormeilles-en-Vexin Airfield (A-59), France, 30 September 1944
- Florennes/Juzaine Airfield (A-78), Belgium, 5 April 1945
- Schleissheim Airfield, Germany (R-75), c. 15 September – 30 December 1945

=== Aircraft ===
- Martin B-26 Marauder, 1942–1945

=== Awards and campaigns ===
| Award streamer | Award | Dates | Notes |
|---|---|---|---|
| | Distinguished Unit Citation | 24–26 July 1944 | France |

| Campaign Streamer | Campaign | Dates | Notes |
|---|---|---|---|
| | Air Offensive, Europe | 8 February 1944–5 June 1944 | |
| | Air Combat, EAME Theater | 8 February 1944–11 May 1945 | |
| | Normandy | 6 June 1944–24 July 1944 | |
| | Northern France | 25 July 1944–14 September 1944 | |
| | Rhineland | 15 September 1944–21 March 1945 | |
| | Ardennes-Alsace | 16 December 1944–25 January 1945 | |
| | Central Europe | 22 March 1944–21 May 1945 | |

== See also ==
- List of Martin B-26 Marauder operators
