= 497th =

497th may refer to:

- 497th Air Refueling Wing, inactive United States Air Force unit
- 497th Bombardment Group, inactive United States Air Force unit
- 497th Bombardment Squadron, inactive United States Air Force unit
- 497th Combat Training Squadron, United States Air Force unit
- 497th Intelligence, Surveillance and Reconnaissance Group (497 ISRG) is an intelligence unit at Joint Base Langley–Eustis, Virginia

== See also ==
- 497 (number)
- 497, the year 497 (CDXCVII) of the Julian calendar
- 497 BC
