= 97th Bombardment Wing (U.S. Army Air Forces) =

97th Bombardment Wing

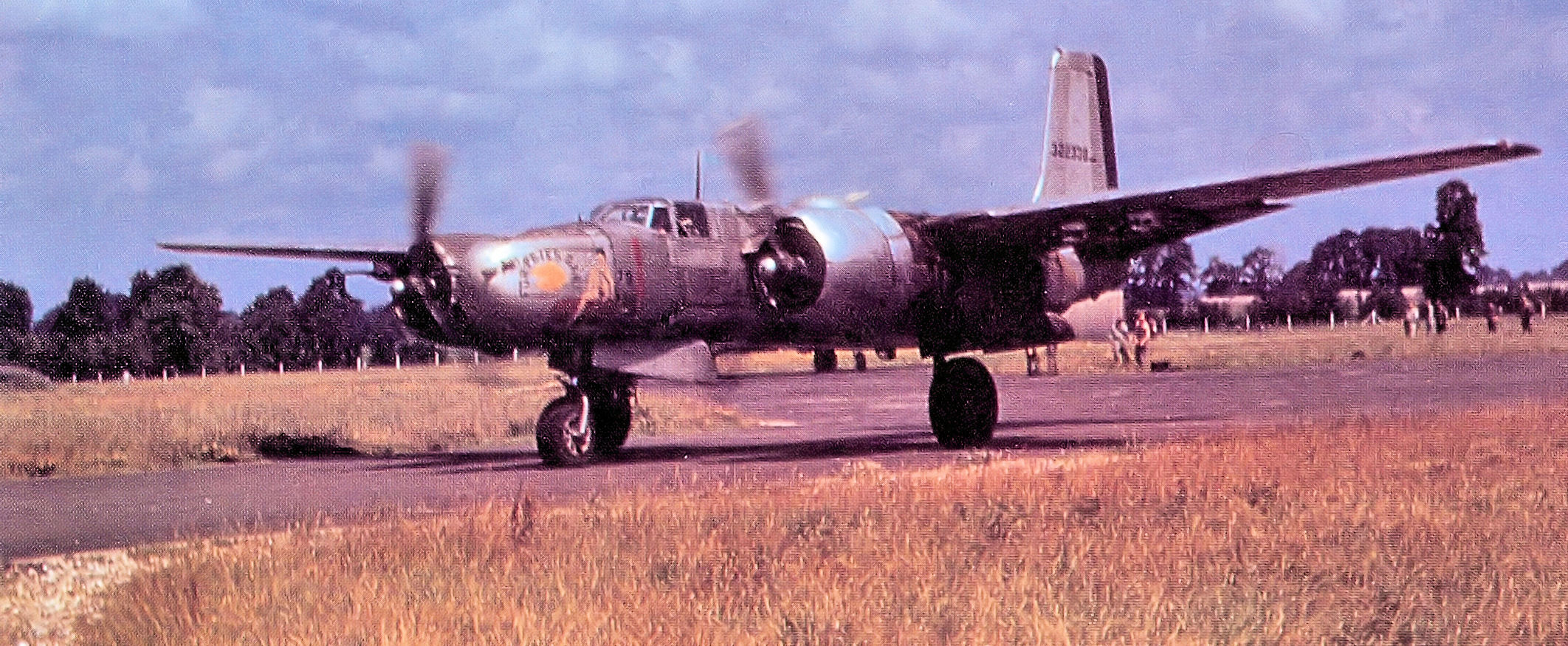
- 416th Bombardment Group A-26 Invader in 1945
- Active: 1943–1945
- Country: United States
- Branch: United States Army Air Forces
- Size: Command of light bomber forces
- Part of: Ninth Air Force
- Engagements: European Theater of Operations

The 97th Bombardment Wing is an inactive United States Army Air Forces unit. Its last assignment was with 9th Bombardment Division, at Camp Shanks, New York, where it was inactivated on 11 October 1945.

== History ==
The wing was activated in late November 1943 at Marks Hall, England. It was assigned three Douglas A-20 Havoc groups in the spring of 1944 and conducted combat missions from April 1944 until VE Day. In late 1944 and early 1945, its groups converted to the more capable Douglas A-26 Invader. In October 1945 the wing returned to the United States and was inactivated.

== Lineage ==
- Constituted as the 97th Combat Bombardment Wing (Medium) on 2 November 1943

Activated on 12 November 1943
Redesignated 97th Combat Bombardment Wing, Light in July 1944
Redesignated 97th Bombardment Wing, Medium in June 1945
Inactivated on 11 October 1945

=== Assignments ===
- 9th Bombardment Division, 12 November 1943 – 11 October 1945

=== Stations ===
- Marks Hall, England (Station 160), 12 November 1943
- RAF Little Walden (AAF-165), England, 13 March 1944
- Voisenon, France, 13 September 1944
- Marchais, Aisne, France, 13 February 1945
- Arrancy, France, 25 April 1945
- Sandaucourt, France, 24 May – 1 October 1945
- Camp Shanks, New York, 10–11 October 1945

=== Components ===
- 409th Bombardment Group: 7 March 1944 – 15 August 1945
- 410th Bombardment Group: 4 April 1944 – June 1945
- 416th Bombardment Group: 4 February 1944 – 27 July 1945 4 (under the operational control of 99th Combat Bombardment Wing, until c. 20 March 1944, IX Bomber Command, 11 – 18 September 1944 and 99th Combat Bombardment Wing, 19 – 28 September 1944)
