= 496th =

496th may refer to:

- 496th Air Base Squadron, United States Air Force unit, stationed at Morón Air Base, Spain
- 496th Bombardment Squadron, inactive United States Air Force unit
- 496th Tactical Fighter Squadron, inactive United States Air Force unit

== See also ==
- 496 (number)
- 496, the year 496 (CDXCVI) of the Julian calendar
- 496 BC
