= 495th =

495th may refer to:

- 495th Bombardment Squadron, inactive United States Air Force unit
- 495th Fighter Squadron, inactive United States Air Force unit

== See also ==
- 495 (number)
- 495, the year 495 (CDXCV) of the Julian calendar
- 495 BC
