= III Bomber Command =

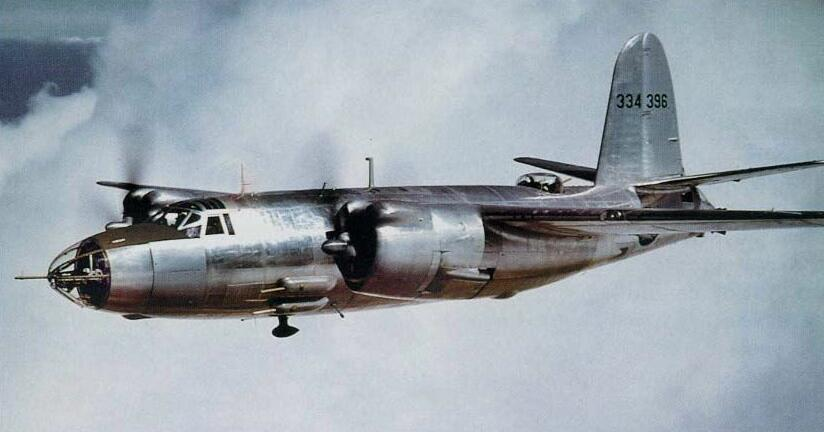
- Martin B-26 Marauder in flight
- Active: 1941-1946
- Country: United States
- Branch: United States Army; United States Air Force
- Role: Command and training of bomber units

Commanders
- Notable commanders: Robert Olds

The III Bomber Command is a disbanded United States Air Force headquarters. It was established in September 1941, shortly before the attack on Pearl Harbor to command bomber units assigned to 3rd Air Force. Following the entry of the United States into World War II, it flew patrols off the south Atlantic and Gulf coasts. However, its main efforts soon began organizing and training medium bomber units and aircrews. Its last assignment was with Third Air Force at MacDill Field, Florida. It was inactivated on 8 April 1946 and disbanded in October 1948.

== History ==
=== Background ===
GHQ Air Force (GHQ AF) had been established with two major combat functions, to maintain a striking force against long range targets, and the air defense of the United States. In the spring of 1941, GHQ AF reorganized its Southeast Air District as 3rd Air Force. To carry out its mission of training and maintaining a strike force, 3rd Air Force organized 3rd Bomber Command at Drew Field, Florida in September 1941, shortly before the attack on Pearl Harbor. The command soon moved to MacDill Field, Florida, where it was located when the attack on Pearl Harbor occurred. Shortly afterwards, it moved to Army Air Base, Savannah, Georgia, but returned to MacDill, where it spent the remainder of the war.

=== Training ===
It patrolled in search of enemy submarines.

The command trained medium bomber units and crews for Third Air Force, and training for this type of unit was virtually a monopoly for the command. Until August 1943, it also conducted training for dive and light bomber units and crews. However their training was transferred to III Air Support Command in August 1942.

In late 1943, some heavy bomber training was moved from Second Air Force, which had been the primary command for that training, to the command in order to enable combined training between fighters and bombers. In conjunction with this transfer, the command adopted the three phase training system for its training units: Phase I (individual training); Phase II (crew training) and Phase III (unit training).

== Lineage ==
- Constituted as the 3rd Bomber Command on 4 September 1941 (Note: Maurer indicates unit was constituted as the "III" Bomber Command. However, the unit was constituted and activated with an arabic number in its name. The use of roman numerals to designate Army Air Forces combat commands did not begin until September 1942. "Air Force Historical Research Agency Organizational Reconds: Types of USAF Organizations". Air Force History Index. 9 January 2008.)

Activated on 5 September 1941

- Redesignated III Bomber Command on 18 September 1942

Inactivated on 8 April 1946
Disbanded on 8 October 1948 (Note: The group was transferred to the United States Air Force when it was established as a separate service in September 1947. The Air Force disbanded it a year later.)

== Assignments ==
- Third Air Force, 5 September 1941
- Probably Tactical Air Command, 21 March 1946 – 8 April 1946

== Components ==
Wings

- 89th Combat Crew Training Wing, from 19 June 1944
- 323d Combat Crew Training Wing, 22 February 1945 – 8 April 1946

Groups

- 3rd Bombardment Group, 8 December 1941 - 2 January 1942
- 12th Bombardment Group, 18 April – 16 August 1942
- 21st Bombardment Group, 11 March – 2 May 1942; 8 May 1942 – 10 October 1943
- 30th Bombardment Group: 15 January – 24 May 1941
- 46th Bombardment Group, 8 May – c. 8 July 1942; 6 August 1943 – 1 May 1944
- 47th Bombardment Group, 1 May – 10 August 1942 (attached to 3d Ground Air Support Command after 29 June 1942)
- 48th Bombardment Group, 8 May – 10 August 1942
- 85th Bombardment Group, 16 March - 2 May 1942; 8 May – 10 August 1942
- 86th Bombardment Group: 10 August 1942 – c. 11 May 1943 (attached to 23d Provisional Training Wing, c. September 1942 – c. March 1943)
- 90th Bombardment Group: 15 April – 12 September 1942
- 91st Bombardment Group: 15 April – c. 28 June 1942
- 92d Bombardment Group: 1 March – August 1942
- 94th Bombardment Group: 15–29 June 1942
- 95th Bombardment Group: 15–26 June 1942
- 100th Bombardment Group: 1–18 June 1942
- 310th Bombardment Group: 15 March – 2 May 1942
- 312th Bombardment Group, 16 March – 2 May 1942
- 319th Bombardment Group: 26 June – c. 12 September 1942
- 322d Bombardment Group: 17 July – c. 15 November 1942
- 335th Bombardment Group, 31 July 1942 – c. 1 May 1944
- 336th Bombardment Group, c. 15 July 1942 – 1 May 1944
- 344th Bombardment Group, 8 September 1942 – c. 26 January 1944
- 386th Bombardment Group, 1 December 1942 – c. 2 June 1943
- 409th Bombardment Group, 6 August 1943 – 7 March 1944
- 410th Bombardment Group, 6 August 1943 – 4 April 1944
- 416th Bombardment Group, 6 August 1943 – January 1944 (attached to II Tactical Air Division 1−22 November 1943)

Squadrons

- 1st Composite Squadron: 19 November 1944 – 2 January 1945
- 3d Reconnaissance Squadron; 5 June 1941 – 25 February 1942 (attached to 13th Bombardment Group)
- 35th Reconnaissance Squadron (Fighter); 15 August – 1 September 1943
- 38th Reconnaissance Squadron (Bombardment; 15 August – 1 September 1943

== Stations ==
- Drew Field, Florida, 5 September 1941
- MacDill Field, Florida, c. September 1941
- Army Air Base, Savannah, Georgia, c. 10 December 1941
- MacDill Field, Florida, c. 15 December 1941 – 8 April 1946
