= 44th Air Division =

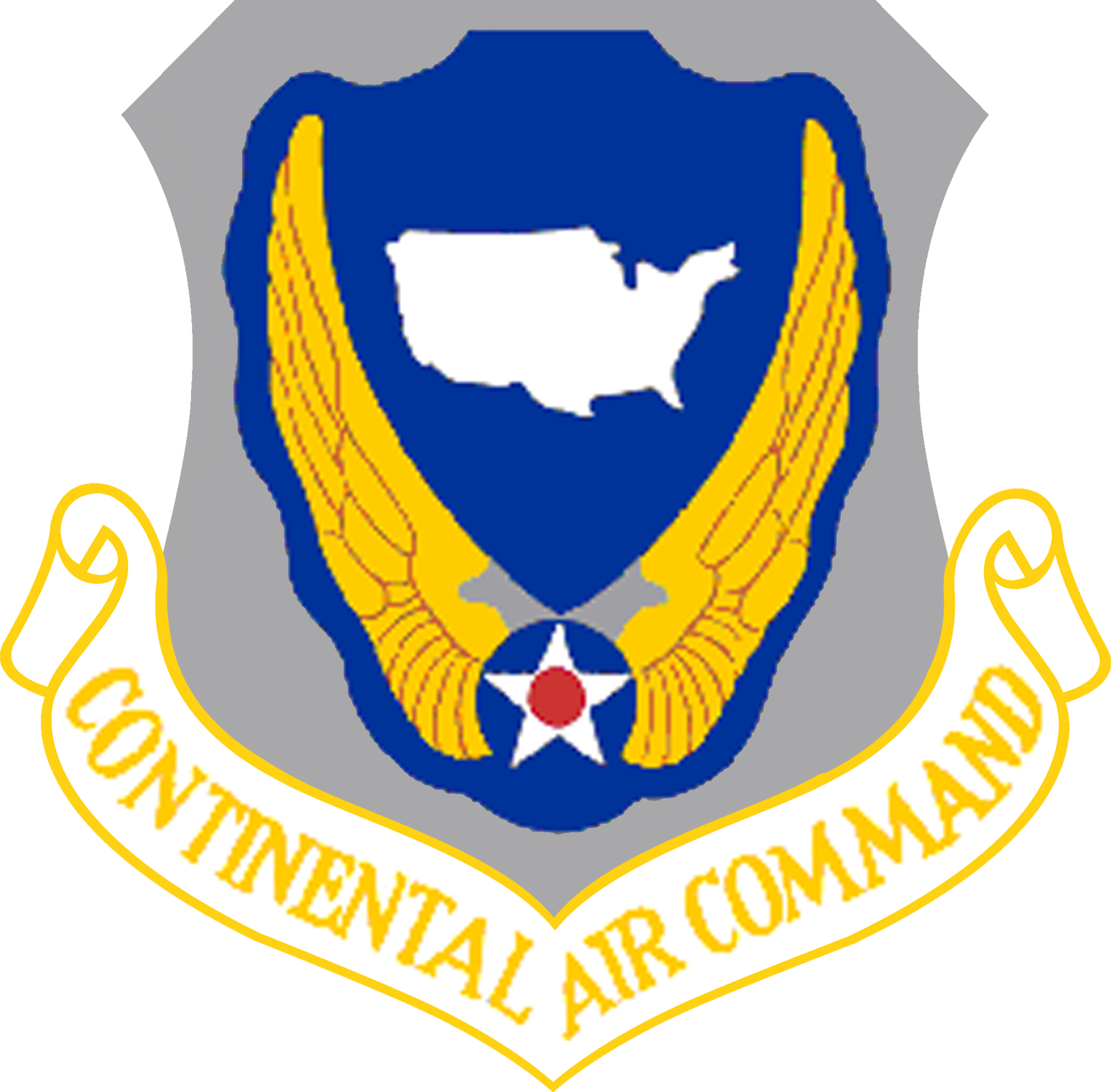
44th Air Division

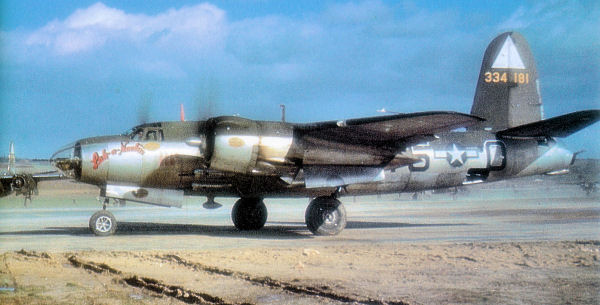
- Martin B-26 of the division's 344th Bombardment Group
- Active: 1943–1945; 1947–1949
- Country: United States
- Branch: United States Air Force
- Engagements: European Theater of World War II

Commanders
- Notable commanders: Lt. Gen. Herbert B. Thatcher

The 44th Air Division, Bombardment was redesignated as a division on 16 April 1948, when it was at Brooks Field (later, Brooks Air Force Base), Texas, under the 14th Air Force, then transferred to the 12th Air Force on 1 July 1948.

== History ==
=== World War II ===
The unit started as the 44th Bombardment Wing, conducting medium bomber training in the United States. It deployed to the European Theater of Operations in the summer of 1943, but before it could being combat operations, was redesignated in November 1943 as the 99th Bombardment Wing and assigned to the new IX Bomber Command, the medium bombardment component of the revamped Ninth Air Force.

Its subordinate units attacked enemy airfields in France, Belgium, and the Netherlands between December 1943 and February 1944. Beginning in March 1944, they bombed rail road and highway bridges, oil tanks, and missile sites in preparation for the invasion of Normandy. Its subordinate units supported the Allied offensive at Caen, France, and the breakthrough at Saint-Lô, France, in July 1944. Between October and December 1944, they bombed bridges, road junctions, and ordnance depots in support of the assault on the Siegfried Line. On 16 December 1944, during a period of poor flying weather, the Germans launched a major offensive, known as the Battle of the Bulge, in the Ardennes Forest. When the weather cleared, 99th BW units bombed supply points, communication centres, bridges, marshalling yards, roads, and oil storage tanks.

=== Air Force Reserve ===
The wing was reactivated as a reserve unit under Air Defense Command (ADC) on 26 June 1947 at Brooks Field, Texas (later Brooks Air Force Base. In 1948, when the regular Air Force implemented the wing base organization system, the wing, along with other multi-base reserve wings was redesignated as an air division. The same year Continental Air Command assumed responsibility for managing reserve and Air National Guard units from ADC.

The 44th was inactivated when Continental Air Command reorganized in June 1949 in response to President Truman’s reduced 1949 defense budget that required reductions in the number of unit (groups – 48) in the Air Force.

Performed bombing operations in Europe until V-E Day

== Lineage ==
- Established as the 44th Bombardment Wing (Heavy) on 15 February 1943
- Activated on 1 March 1943
- Redesignated 99th Combat Bombardment Wing (Medium) on 2 November 1943
- Redesignated 99th Combat Bombardment Wing, Medium on 13 August 1944
- Redesignated 99th Bombardment Wing, Medium on 16 June 1945
- Inactivated on 4 October 1945
- Redesignated 44th Bombardment Wing, Very Heavy on 27 May 1947 and allotted to the reserve.
- Activated on 26 June 1947
- Redesignated 44th Air Division, Bombardment on 16 April 1948
- Inactivated on 27 June 1949

=== Assignments ===
- Second Air Force, 1 March 1943
- Eighth Air Force, c.28 July 1943
- VIII Air Support Command, c.28 September 1943
- IX Bomber Command (later, 9 Bombardment Division, 9th Air Division), c. November 1943–16 September 1945
- Army Service Forces, Port of Embarkation, 17 September 1945 – 4 October 1945
- Tenth Air Force, 26 June 1947
- Fourteenth Air Force, 1 July 1948
- Twelfth Air Force, 12 January 1949 – 27 June 1949

=== Components ===
- Ninth Air Force

322d Bombardment Group: 16 October 1943 – 15 September 1945 (B-26 Marauder)
344th Bombardment Group: c.28 February 1944–c.30 April 1945
386th Bombardment Group: 16 October 1943 – 27 July 1945 (B-26 Marauder)
391st Bombardment Group: 25 January 1944 – 27 July 1945 (B-26 Marauder)

- 394th Bombardment Group: c.22 January 1945 – 30 November 1945
- United States Air Force Reserve

312th Bombardment Group: 30 July 1947 – 27 June 1949
401st Bombardment Group: 1947–1949
447th Bombardment Group: 1947–1949

=== Stations ===
- Salt Lake City Army Air Base, Utah, 1 March 1943
- Biggs Field, Texas, 14 May 1943 – 4 July 1943
- RAF Aldermaston (AAF-467), United Kingdom, 28 July 1943
- RAF Great Dunmow (AAF-164), United Kingdom, 12 November 1943
- Beaumont sur Oise Airfield (A-60), 25 September 1944
- Tirlemont (Tienen), Belgium, 27 April 1945
- Namur Airfield, Belgium, 1 July 1945–c.8 August 1945
- Camp Myles Standish, Massachusetts, 3 October 1945 – 4 October 1945
- Brooks Field (later Brooks Air Force Base, Texas, 26 June 1947 – 27 June 1949

=== Aircraft ===
- Martin B-26 Marauder, 1943–1945
- Douglas A-26 Invader, 1944–1945
- Boeing B-29 Superfortress, 1948–1949

=== Service streamers ===
This unit earned the following organizational service streamers:

- World War II: European African Middle Eastern (EAME) Theater

=== Commanders ===
- Unknown, 1 March 1943 – 11 November 1943
- Brigadier General Herbert B. Thatcher, 12 November 1943
- Colonel Reginald F. C. Vance, 7 November 1944
- Major Charles F. Salter, 1 July 1945
- Lieutenant Colonel William W. Brier, 13 July 1945
- Brigadier General Richard C. Sanders, 12 August 1945– c.4 October 1945
- Unknown, 26 June 1947 – 27 June 1949

== See also ==
- List of United States Air Force air divisions
