= 126th Operations Group =

Group of the Illinois Air National Guard

126th Operations Group

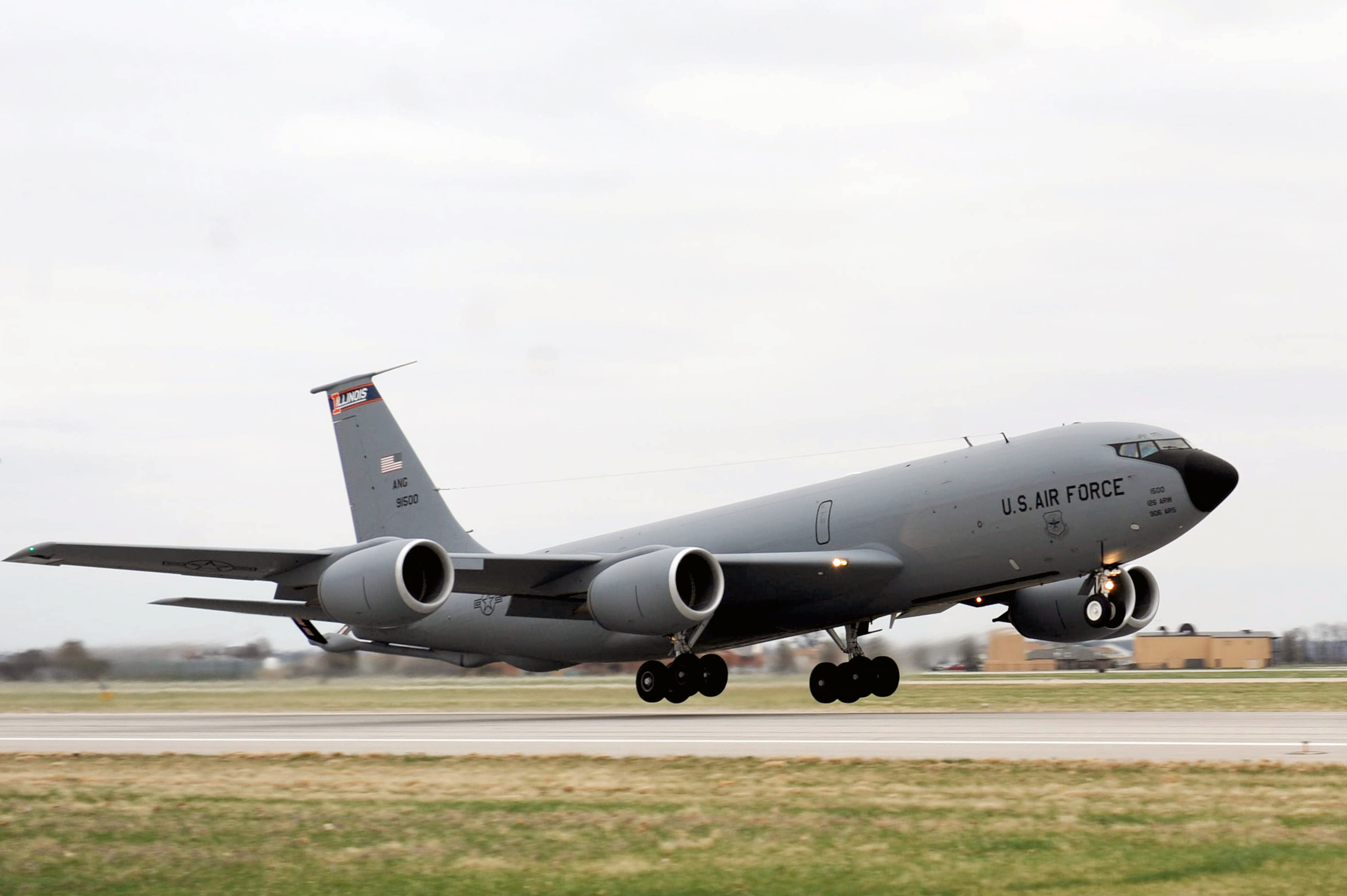
- 126th Air Refueling Wing KC-135 Stratotanker taking off to support Joint Task Force Odyssey Dawn (Note: Aircraft is Boeing KC-135R Stratotanker, serial 59–1500. It was constructed as a KC-135A-BN.), 24 March 2011
- Active: 1942–1946; 1947–1953, 1953–1974, 1993–present
- Country: United States
- Allegiance: Illinois
- Branch: Air National Guard
- Role: Air refueling
- Part of: Illinois Air National Guard
- Garrison/HQ: Scott Air Force Base, Belleville, Illinois
- Nickname: The Silver Streaks (World War II)
- Mottos: We Win or Die (World War II) Anytime, Anywhere
- Engagements: European Theater of Operations
- Decorations: Distinguished Unit Citation

Commanders
- Current commander: Col Jeanette A. Moore

Insignia
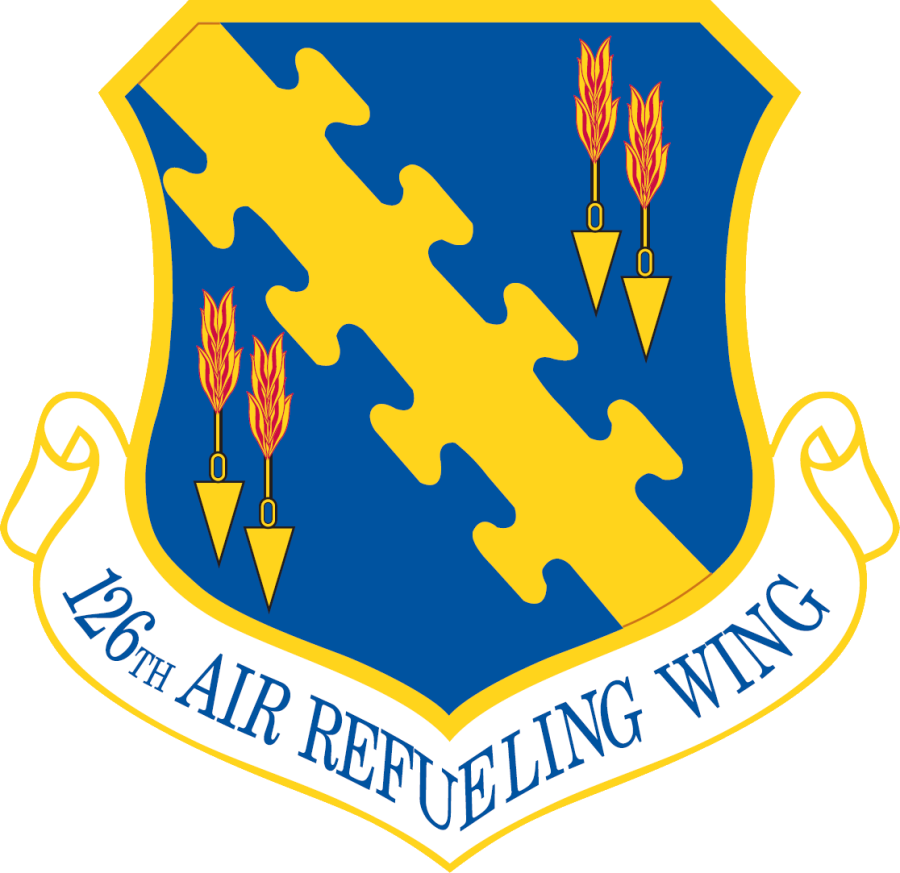
- 126th Operations Group emblem (Note: While assigned to the 126th Wing, the group uses the wing emblem with the group designation on the scroll. AF Instruction 84-105, Organizational Lineage, Honors and History, 27 April 2017, paragraph 3.3.3.)

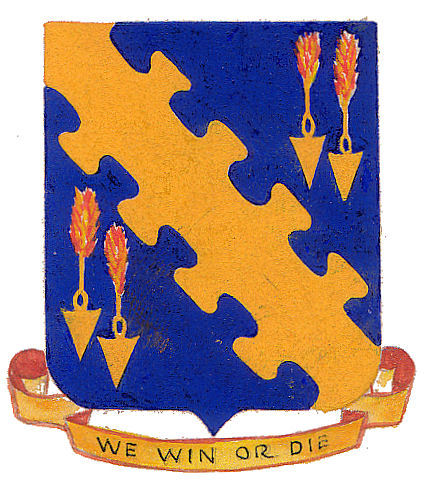
- 344th Bombardment Group emblem (Note: Approved 9 January 1943. Description: Azure, a bend nebul[y] or, between four spears, points to base, two and two of the last [color], inflamed proper.)

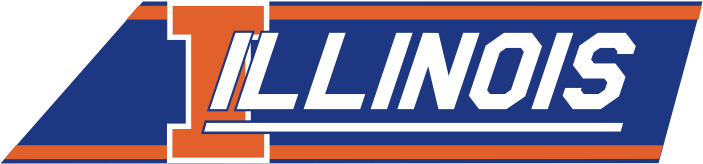
- Tail stripe
- World War II tail marking (Note: Bordered black on uncamouflaged aircraft.): White triangle

Aircraft flown
- Tanker: KC-135R

The 126th Operations Group is an air refuelling group of the United States Air Force and the Illinois Air National Guard. While its primary task is to refuel aircraft in flight, it can transport, airlift, supplies and personnel. The unit is also tasked with supporting the nuclear strike missions of the Single Integrated Operational Plan.

During peacetime, the group receives direction through the adjutant general of Illinois, the governor of Illinois and the National Guard Bureau. Upon federal mobilization, the wing is assigned to Air Mobility Command and the 15th Expeditionary Mobility Task Force.

== History ==
=== World War II ===
==== Training in the United States ====
The group was activated in September 1942 at MacDill Field, as the 344th Bombardment Group, with the 494th, 495th, 496th and 497th Bombardment Squadrons assigned. In December, the group moved to nearby Drane Field, Florida. At Drane, the unit served as a Replacement Training Unit (RTU) for Martin B-26 Marauders. RTUs were oversized units that trained individual pilots or aircrews prior to their deployment to overseas theaters.

In July 1943, the group stopped training other crews and began training to enter combat. It completed its training at Hunter Field, Georgia, and departed for the European Theater of Operations on 26 January 1944.

==== Combat in Europe ====
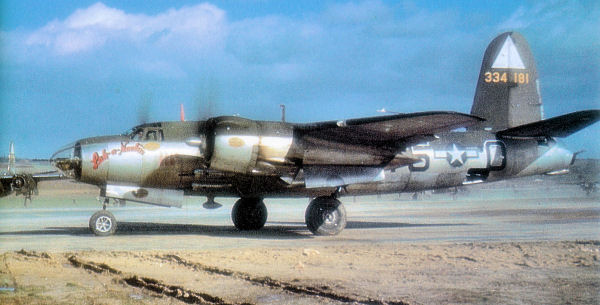
Group B-26 Marauder AAF preparing to take off at Stansted in 1944 (Note: Aircraft is Martin B-26-1-MA Marauder, Lak-A-Nookie, serial 43-34181.)

The group arrived at its first combat station, RAF Stansted Mountfitchet, on 8 February 1944. It began operations with IX Bomber Command in March. It attacked targets in France, Belgium and the Netherlands, including airfields, marshalling yards, submarine pens and coastal defenses. After a poor bombing performance by the 344th on 10 April, the group was taken off operations for a week for additional training. It returned to operations, participating in Operation Crossbow, the attacks on V-1 flying bomb and V-2 rocket launch sites. Starting in May, it concentrated on attacks on bridges in France, preparing for Operation Overlord, the forthcoming invasion in Normandy.

On D Day, 6 June 1944, it attacked coastal batteries at Cherbourg. During the remainder of the month it supported the drive to seize the Cotentin Peninsula and bombed German defensive positions to support British forces near Caen. On 24 July, the group attacked a bridge across the Loire near Tours. An intense flak barrage dispersed the lead flight of the 344th Group, but the remainder of the formation held and destroyed the bridge. It attacked troop concentrations the next day and supply dumps on 26 July to assist advancing ground forces in Operation Cobra, the breakout at Saint Lo. For these actions, it was awarded a Distinguished Unit Citation.

It knocked out bridges to hinder German forces' withdrawal through the Falaise Gap and bombed strong points and vessels in the harbor of Brest in July and August. For the next two months, it concentrated on attacking rail lines, bridges, supply dumps and ordnance depots in Germany, moving to the European Continent and Cormeilles-en-Vexin Airfield, France in September. From December through January 1945, it supported ground forces in the Battle of the Bulge. Until April 1945, it continued combat operations against supply points, communications centers, marshalling yards, roads, and oil storage centers. The squadron flew its last mission on 25 April, an attack on Erding Airfield. During this raid, one of its Marauders was shot down by a Messerschmitt Me 262 jet fighter.

=== Occupation duty and return to the United States ===
Following V-E Day, the group flew training flights and participated in air demonstrations. It moved to Schleissheim Airfield, near Munich, Germany in September as part of the United States Air Forces in Europe's occupation forces. There, the group began training on the Douglas A-26 Invader, but continued to fly Marauders as well. On 15 February 1946, the squadron's personnel and aircraft were withdrawn and it moved on paper to Bolling Field, District of Columbia, where it inactivated at the end of March.

=== Initial National Guard service ===
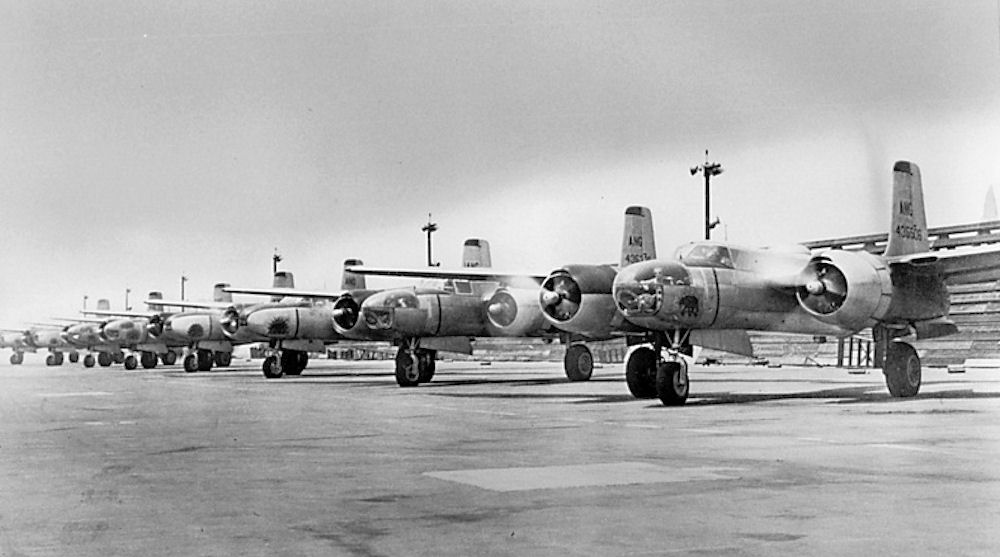
B-26 Invaders of the group's 115th Bombardment Squadron

The group was redesignated the 126th Bombardment Group and allotted to the National Guard on 24 May 1946. It was activated at Chicago Midway Airport, Illinois on 11 February 1947 and federally recognized on 19 June. It was assigned the 107th Bombardment Squadron of the Michigan National Guard and the 168th and 108th Bombardment Squadrons at Midway. The squadron was once again equipped with Invaders, now called B-26s.

=== Mobilization and subsequent service ===
In November 1950, the National Guard reorganized under the Wing Base Organization used by the regular Air Force and the group became the operational element of the new 126th Composite Wing as the 126th Composite Group, adding a fighter squadron, but losing its Michigan squadron. In February, the group became a bombardment unit again. It was mobilized for the Korean War in April, adding the 115th Bombardment Squadron when it moved to Langley Air Force Base, Virginia. It moved to France at the end of the year to reinforce NATO. On 1 January 1953, it was inactivated and returned to the National Guard. Its personnel and equipment were transferred to the 38th Bombardment Group, which was simultaneously activated.

=== Cold War National Guard service ===
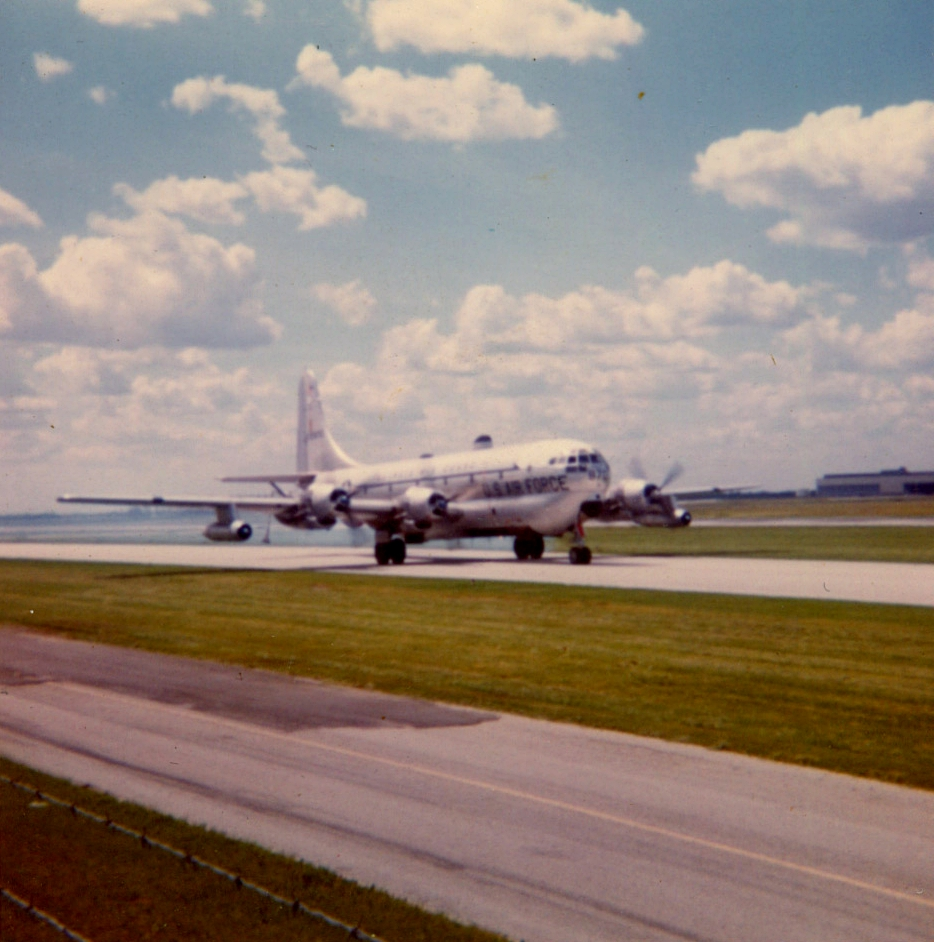
KC-97 Stratofreighter at O'Hare IAP

The group was activated the same day in the Guard at Midway Airport as the 126th Fighter-Bomber Group. The group moved to O'Hare International Airport, Illinois in 1954 It continued to fly fighters until 1961 as the 126th Fighter-Interceptor Group and 126th Fighter Group (Air Defense) until 1961, when it became the 126th Air Refueling Group. In 1974, the Air Force inactivated Air National Guard groups located on the same base as their parent wing, and the group inactivated on 9 December, transferring its units to the 126th Air Refueling Wing.

=== Post Cold War ===
In 1992, the Air Force began to implement its Objective Wing organization with National Guard units, and the group was activated at O'Hare International Airport, Illinois as the 126th Operations Group with the 108th Air Refueling Squadron and 126th Operations Support Squadron. In 1999, following the recommendations of the 1995 Base Realignment and Closure Commission it moved to Scott Air Force Base, Illinois.

== Lineage ==
- Constituted as the 344th Bombardment Group (Medium) on 31 August 1942

Activated on 8 September 1942
Redesignated 344th Bombardment Group, Medium by 1944
Redesignated 344th Bombardment Group, Light on 3 December 1945
Inactivated on 31 March 1946

- Redesignated 126th Bombardment Squadron, Light and allotted to the National Guard on 24 May 1946

Activated on 11 February 1947
Federally recognized on 19 June 1947
Redesignated 126th Composite Group on 1 November 1950
Redesignated 126th Bombardment Group, Light on 1 February 1951
Ordered into active service on 1 April 1951
Inactivated and released from active service on 1 January 1953

- Redesignated 126th Fighter-Bomber Group and activated in the Air National Guard on 1 January 1953

Redesignated 126th Fighter-Interceptor Group on 1 July 1955
Redesignated 126th Fighter Group (Air Defense, c. 10 March 1958
Redesignated 126th Air Refueling Group, Tactical on 1 July 1961
Redesignated 126th Air Refueling Group, Medium
Inactivated on 9 December 1974

- Redesignated 126th Operations Group

Activated c. 1 January 1993

=== Assignments ===
- III Bomber Command, 8 September 1942
- 99th Combat Bombardment Wing, c. 26 January 1944
- 98th Bombardment Wing, 1945
- XII Tactical Air Command, 27 November 1945
- Continental Air Forces (later Strategic Air Command), 15 February 1946 – 31 March 1946
- 71st Fighter Wing, 11 February 1947
- 66th Fighter Wing, August 1949
- 126th Composite Wing (later 126th Bombardment Wing), 1 November 1950 – 1 January 1953
- 126th Fighter-Bomber Wing (later 126th Fighter-Interceptor Wing, 126th Air Defense Wing, 126th Air Refueling Wing), 1 January 1953 – 9 December 1974
- 126th Air Refueling Wing, c. 1 January 1993 – present

=== Components ===
Operational Squadrons

- 107th Bombardment Squadron, 11 February 1947 – c. 1 July 1950
- 108th Bombardment Squadron (later 108th Fighter-Bomber Squadron, 108th Fighter-Interceptor Squadron, 108th Air Refueling Squadron), 19 October 1947 – Present
- 115th Bombardment Squadron, c. 1 April 1951 – May 1951
- 168th Bombardment Squadron (later 168th Fighter Bomber Squadron, 168th Fighter-Interceptor Squadron), 19 October 1947 – 31 May 1958
- 169th Fighter Squadron (later 169th Fighter-Bomber Squadron, 169th Fighter-Interceptor Squadron), 1 November 1950 – 1 February 1951; 1 January 1953 – 10 November 1958
- 494th Bombardment Squadron, 8 September 1942 – 31 March 1946
- 495th Bombardment Squadron, 8 September 1942 – 31 March 1946
- 496th Bombardment Squadron, 8 September 1942 – 31 March 1946
- 497th Bombardment Squadron, 8 September 1942 – 30 December 1945

=== Stations ===
- MacDill Field, Florida, 8 September 1942
- Drane Field, Florida, 28 December 1942
- Hunter Field, Georgia, 28 December 1943- 26 January 1944
- RAF Stansted Mountfitchet (AAF-169), England, 11 February 1944
- Cormeilles-en-Vexin Airfield (A-59), France, 30 September 1944
- Florennes/Juzaine Airfield (A-78), Belgium, c. 4 April 1945
- Schleissheim Airfield (R-75), Germany, c. 15 September 1945 – 15 February 1946
- Bolling Field, District of Columbia, 15 February 1946 – 31 March 1946
- Chicago Midway Airport, Illinois, 11 February 1947
- Langley Air Force Base, Virginia, 25 July 1951 – 19 November 1951
- Bordeaux-Mérignac Air Base, France, December 1951
- Laon-Couvron Air Base, France, 25 May 1952 – 1 January 1953
- Chicago Midway Airport, Illinois, 1 January 1953
- O'Hare International Airport, Illinois, April 1954
- Scott Air Force Base, Illinois, 31 July 1999 – present

=== Aircraft ===
- Martin B-26 Marauder, 1942–1946
- Douglas A-26 Invader, 1945–1946, 1947–1953
- North American F-86 Sabre
- Boeing KC-97 Stratofreighter, 1961-1974
- Boeing KC-135 Stratotanker, 1993–present
