= 322d Air Expeditionary Group =

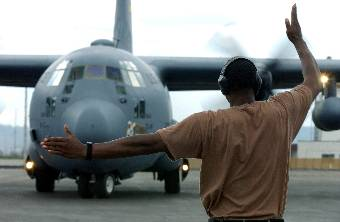
- SSG Austin Layton marshals a C-130 Hercules aircraft (Note: Sgt Layton is a flight manager assigned to the 322nd Air Expeditionary Group)
- Active: 1942–1945; 1947–1949; 1954–1957; 2004; 2006; 2007; 2011–2012; 2012
- Country: United States
- Branch: United States Air Force
- Role: Expeditionary operations
- Motto: Recto Faciendo Neminem Timmeo Latin I Fear None in Doing Right
- Engagements: European Theater of Operations
- Decorations: Distinguished Unit Citation

Insignia
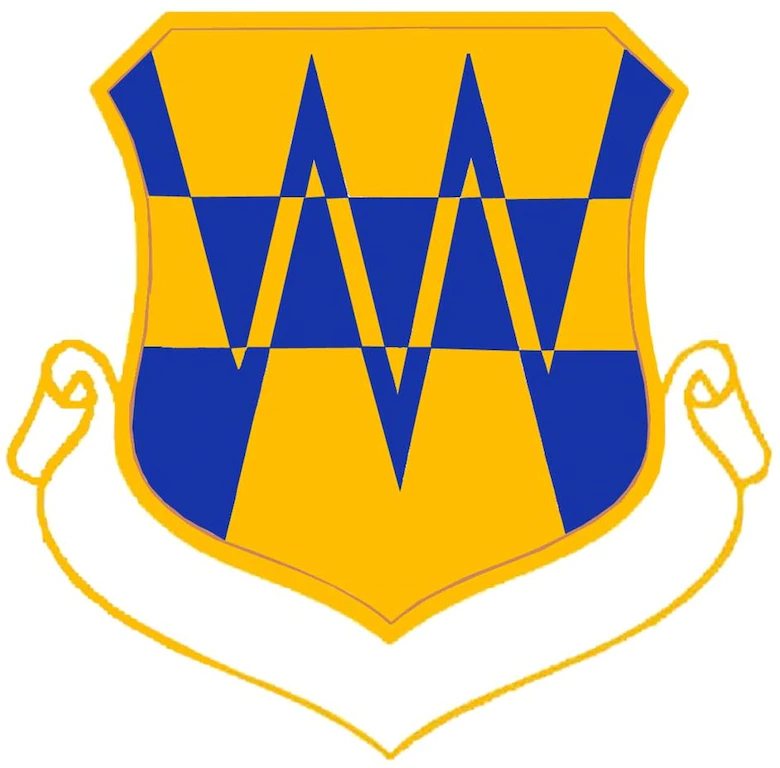
- 322d Air Expeditionary Group emblem

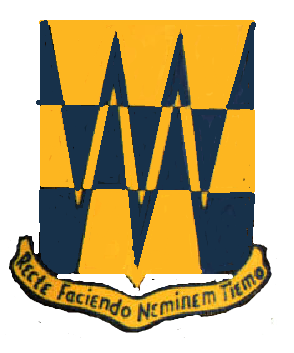
- 322 Bombardment Gp emblem (Note: Approved 9 January 1943.)

The 322d Air Expeditionary Group is a provisional United States Air Force unit assigned to the United States Air Forces in Europe. As a provisional unit, it may be activated or inactivated at any time.

The group appears to have been activated periodically on-order to provide support to U.S./AU activities in Africa under USAFE's Seventeenth Air Force. In 2004, elements of the group assisted the AU deployment to Sudan; Operation Odyssey Dawn for Libya 2011–12.

During World War II, the group's predecessor unit, the 322d Bombardment Group (Medium) was a Martin B-26 Marauder bombardment group assigned to the Eighth and later Ninth Air Force.

== History ==
=== 322d Bombardment Group (Medium) ===
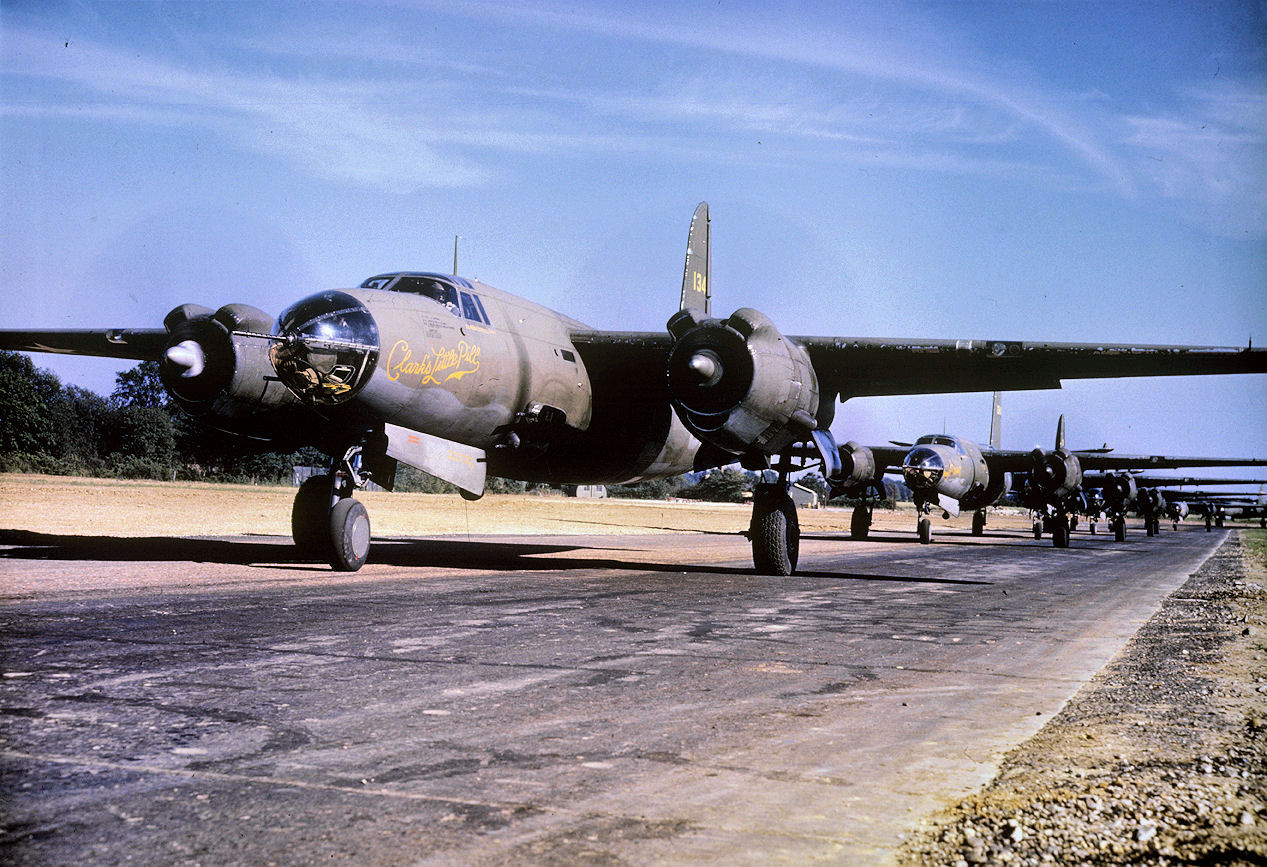
Martin B-26 Marauder of the 322d Bomb Group (Medium) on the perimeter track prior to takeoff

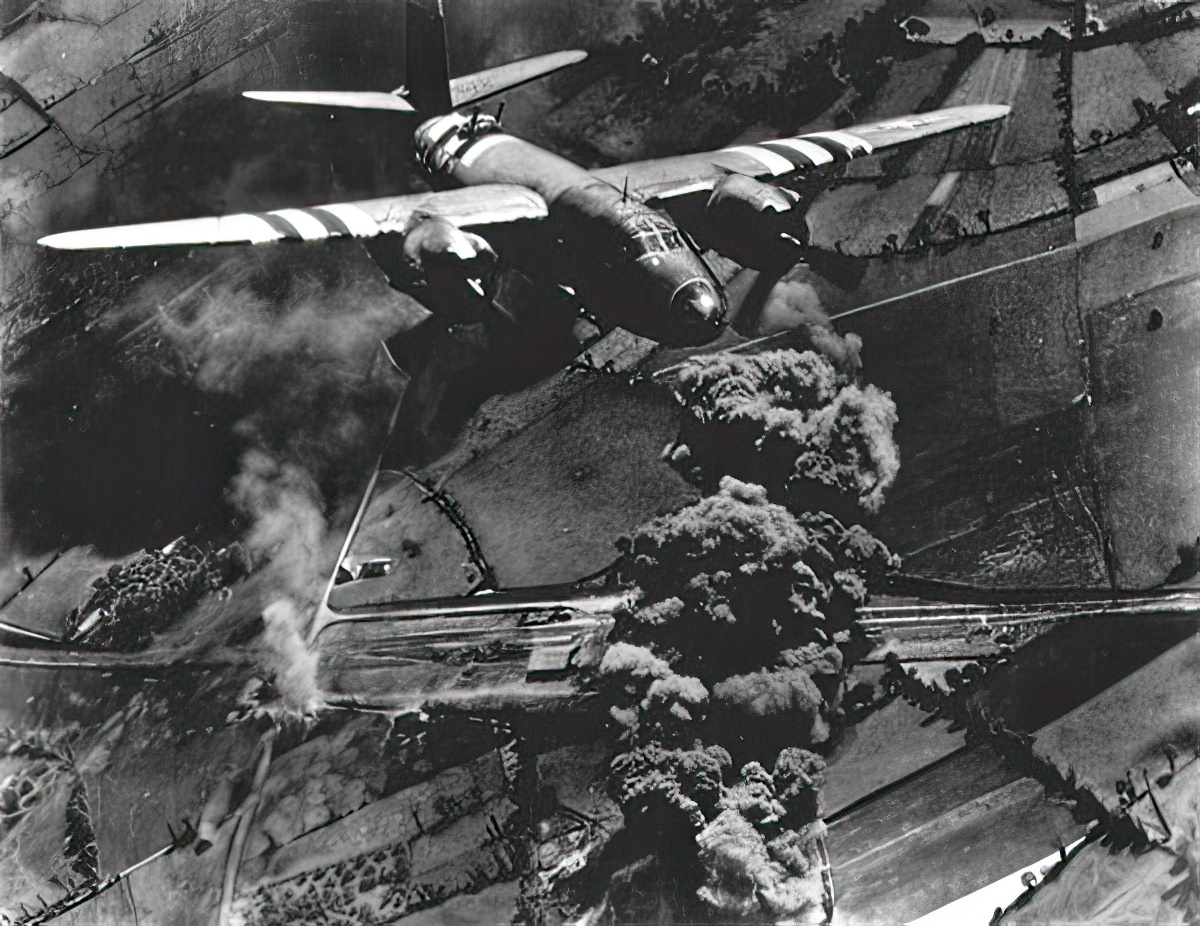
Martin B-26 Marauder of the 322d Bomb Group on a mission over enemy-occupied territory, 1944.

Constituted as 322d Bombardment Group (Medium) on 19 June 1942. Activated on 17 July 1942 at MacDill Field, Florida, later relocating to Lakeland Army Air Field/Drane Field, Florida. Trained with Martin B-26 Marauder aircraft. Part of the group moved overseas to RAF Bury St Edmunds, England, November–December 1942; planes and crews followed, March–April 1943. Initially assigned to the Eighth Air Force. The group was assigned to the 3d Bomb Wing.

Ongoing construction at Bury St. Edmunds forced two of the group's squadrons to locate at RAF Rattlesden, and the group's aircraft did not arrive until late in March 1943. Once operational, the 322d flew two low-level bombing operations from Bury St. Edmunds. The first, on 14 May when it dispatched 12 planes for a minimum-level attack on an electrical generating plant near Ijtnuiden. This was the first operational combat mission flown by B-26s.

The second was a disastrous mission to the Netherlands on Monday, 17 May, when the group sent 11 aircraft on a similar operation from which none of the aircraft penetrating the enemy coast, returned. 60 crewmen were lost to flak and interceptors. Group morale was not improved when, on 29 May, a B-26 crashed onto the airfield killing the crew and damaging a hangar.

After these missions, the group was re-equipped and trained for medium-altitude operations for several weeks before returning to combat operations. On 13 June, the 322d moved to RAF Andrews Field in Essex.

In common with other Marauder units of the 3d Bomb Wing, the 322d was transferred to Ninth Air Force on 16 October 1943. The group attacked enemy airfields in France, Belgium, and the Netherlands attacking the principal targets but the group also attacked secondary targets such as power stations, shipyards, construction works, and marshalling yards.

On 11 December 1943 Andrews Field was attacked by the Luftwaffe but little damage was done and beginning in March 1944 the 322d bombed railway and highway bridges, oil tanks, and missile sites in preparation for the invasion of Normandy.

On 8 May 1944, one of the 322nd aircraft, nicknamed "Mild and Bitter" (serial 41-31819) became the first B-26 flying from England to complete 100 combat missions. Another B-26, "Flak Bait" (41-31773) survived to the end of hostilities with 202 missions to its credit, the only US bomber involved in combat over Europe to pass the 200 mark.

On D-Day, 6 June 1944 the 322d Bomb Group attacked coastal defences and gun batteries. Afterwards, during the Normandy campaign, the 322d pounded fuel and ammunition dumps, bridges, and road junctions, supporting the Allied offensive at Caen and the breakthrough at Saint-Lô in July.

From Andrews Field the 322d received a Distinguished Unit Citation for the period 14 May 1943 – 24 July 1944. The group moved during September 1944, transferring to Beauvais (A-61) Airfield in northern France, and aiding the drive of Third Army across France.

The 322d flew its last mission on 24 April 1945. After V-E Day, the group was assigned to occupation duty in Germany beginning in June 1945, engaging in inventorying and disassembling German Air Force equipment and facilities. Returned to Camp Kilmer, New Jersey in December 1945, and was inactivated on 15 December.

=== 322d Bombardment Group, Light ===
During the Cold War, the 322d was redesignated the 322d Bombardment Group, Light and activated in the Air Force reserve at Reading Army Airfield, Pennsylvania on 9 August 1947. The 322d was equipped with four squadrons (35th, 449th, 450th, 451st and 452d) Douglas A-20 Havocs. It was inactivated on 27 June 1949.

=== 322d Tactical Fighter Group ===
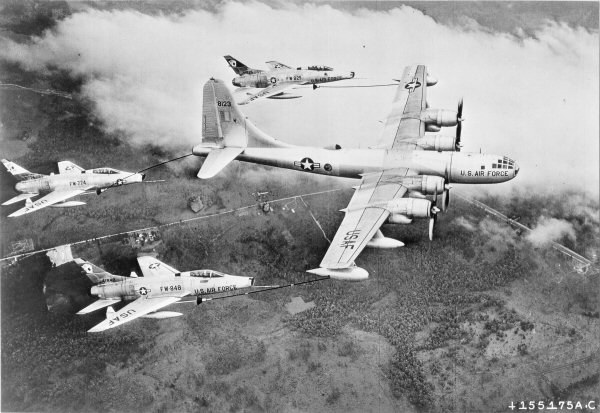
Boeing KB-50D Superfortress 48-123 of the 622d Air Refueling Squadron carrying out first triple-point refueling operation with three North American F-100C Super Sabres (54-1825, 53-1774 & 54-1848) of the 451st Tactical Fighter Squadron, 1956

The United States Air Force reactivated the unit as the 322d Fighter-Day Group at Foster Air Force Base, Texas on 1 July 1954. The 322d was assigned to Tactical Air Command as part of the 450th Fighter-Day Wing, initially as three squadron (450th, 451st, 452d) North American F-86 Sabre-equipped wing. In 1956, the group was upgraded to the North American F-100 Super Sabre and was redesignated as the 322d Tactical Fighter group. The 322d was inactivated on 1 January 1959 along with the closure of Foster Air Force Base in a budgetary economy move.

=== 322d Air Expeditionary Group ===
In 2004 the 322d Air Expeditionary Group was activated as part of the United States Air Forces in Europe as an Air Expeditionary unit.

== Lineage ==
- Constituted as the 322d Bombardment Group (Medium) on 19 June 1942

Redesignated 322d Bombardment Group, Medium on 20 August 1943
Inactivated on 15 December 1945

- Redesignated 322d Bombardment Group, Light

Activated in the reserve on 9 August 1947
Inactivated on 27 June 1949

- Redesignated as 322d Fighter-Day Group

Activated on 1 July 1954
Inactivated on 18 November 1957

- Redesignated 322d Tactical Airlift Group on 31 July 1985
- Converted to provisional status and redesignated 322d Air Expeditionary Group
- Activated on 1 July 2004

Inactivated on 24 July 2004

- Activated on 20 January 2006

Inactivated on 9 April 2006

- Activated on 20 January 2006

Inactivated on 9 April 2006

- Activated on 21 July 2007

Inactivated on 17 August 2007

- Activated in 2011

Inactivated on 1 January 2012

- Activated on 20 January 2012

Inactivated on 8 May 2012

=== Assignments ===
- III Bomber Command, 17 July 1942 – November 1942
- 3d Bombardment Wing, 1 December 1942
- IX Bomber Command, 16 October 1943
- 98th Combat Bombardment Wing (later 98th Bombardment Wing), 5 December 1943 – Sep 1945
- Tenth Air Force, 9 August 1947 – 27 June 1949
- United States Air Forces in Europe to activate or inactivate as needed

Attached to Third Air Force, 1 July 2004 – 24 July 2004
16th Air and Space Expeditionary Task Force, 20 January 2006 – 9 April 2006
Attached to 48th Fighter Wing, 21 July 2007 – 17 August 2007
Unknown, 2011 – 1 January 2012
Attached to Seventeenth Air Force, 20 January 2012 – 1 April 2012
17th Air Expeditionary Force, 1 April 2012 – 8 May 2012

=== Components ===
- 449th Bombardment Squadron, 17 July 1942 – 11 December 1945; 4 October 1947 – 27 June 1949
- 450th Bombardment Squadron (later 450th Fighter-Day Squadron), 17 June 1942 – 15 December 1945; 9 August 1947 – 27 June 1949; 1 July 1954 – 18 November 1957
- 451st Bombardment Squadron (later 451st Fighter-Day Squadron), 17 July 1942 – 11 December 1945; 9 August 1947 – 27 June 1949; 1 July 1954 – 18 November 1957
- 452d Bombardment Squadron (later 452d Fighter-Day Squadron), 17 July 1942 – 12 December 1945; 9 August 1947 – 27 June 1949; 1 July 1954 – 18 November 1957

=== Stations ===
- MacDill Field, Florida, 17 July 1942
- Drane Field, Florida, 22 September – November 1942
- RAF Bury St Edmunds (AAF-468), England c. 1 December 1942
- RAF Andrews Field (AAF-485), England January 1943
- Beauvais/Tille Airfield (A-61), France, September 1944
- Le Culot Airfield (A-89), Belgium, March 1945
- AAF Station Fritzlar, Germany, June–September 1945
- Reading Army Air Field, Pennsylvania, 9 August 1947 – 27 June 1949
- Foster Air Force Base, Texas, 1 July 1954 – 30 November 1957
- Rhein-Main Air Base, West Germany 1 January 1970 – 30 June 1975
- Air Force Base Hoedspruit, South Africa, 1 July 2004 – 24 July 2004
- Aviano Air Base, Italy, 20 January 2006 – 9 April 2006
- Bulboaca, 21 July 2007 – 17 August 2007
- Unknown, 2011 – 1 January 2012
- Souda Bay, Greece, 20 January 2012 – 8 May 2012

=== Aircraft ===
- Martin B-26 Marauder, 1942–1945
- Douglas A-20 Havoc, 1947–1949
- North American F-86 Sabre, 1954–1956
- North American F-100 Super Sabre, 1956–1959
- Lockheed C-130 Hercules (since 2003)

== See also ==
- List of Martin B-26 Marauder operators
