= List of Martin B-26 Marauder operators =

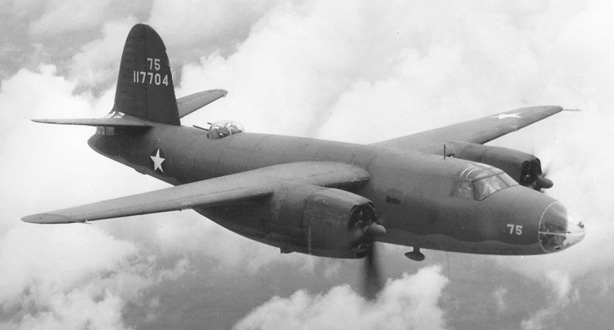
- B-26B Marauder in flight

This is a list of Martin B-26 Marauder operators. The main user of the Martin B-26 Marauder was the United States Army Air Forces (USAAF). During this period the Martin Marauder was also operated by the US Navy, Free French Air Force, the South African Air Force and the Royal Air Force; serving with many units and in many different theaters of conflict on several continents.

== Operators ==
=== France ===
French Air Force

All six squadrons below were operating under command of 42d Bombardment Wing of the US Twelfth Air Force.

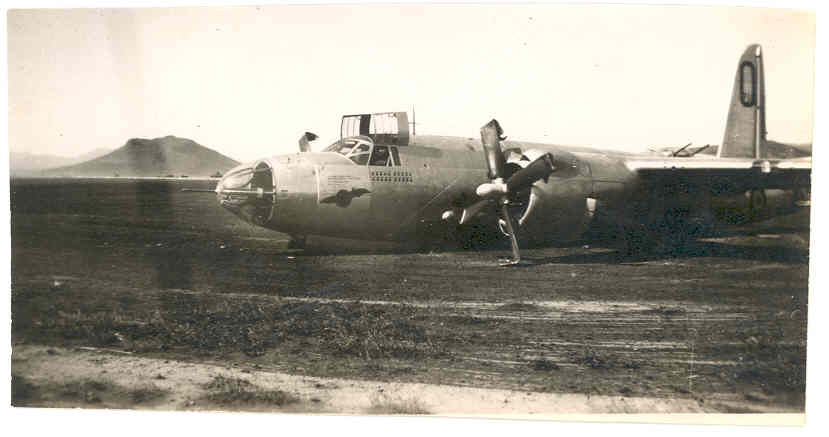
A B-26 from GBM 1/22 shot down somewhere in the desert of North Africa during World War II.

- 31e escadre
  - GBM 1/19 Gascogne
  - GBM 2/20 Bretagne
  - GBM 1/22 Maroc
- 34e escadre
  - GBM 1/32 Bourgogne
  - GBM 2/52 Franche-Comté
  - GBM 2/63 Sénégal

=== South Africa ===
South African Air Force

- 3rd Wing, North African Air Forces
- 12 Squadron, North African Air Forces
- 21 Squadron, North African Air Forces
- 24 Squadron, North African Air Forces
- 25 Squadron, Balkan Air Force
- 30 Squadron, North African Air Forces

=== United Kingdom ===
Royal Air Force

- No. 14 Squadron RAF from 1942-43 in North Africa.
- No. 39 Squadron RAF from 1944-46 in Italy and later Sudan.
- No.70 Operational Training Unit from 1943-1945 at RAF Shandur, Egypt.

=== United States ===
United States Army Air Corps/Army Air Forces

- Fifth Air Force
  - 22d Bombardment Group including the 2d, 19th, 33d and 408th Bombardment Squadrons.
- Seventh Air Force
  - 69th BS & 70th BS, independent. Later assigned to 13th AF, 42nd BG and eventually reequipped with B-25 aircraft.
- Eighth Air Force

Several Eighth Air Force B-26 units transferred to the Ninth Air Force in October 1943. The Marauders had been part of VIII Air Support Command and 3rd Bomb Wing.

  - 25th Bombardment Group, operated by the 654th Bomb Squadron at RAF Watton, England from 1944-1945.
- Ninth Air Force
  - First Pathfinder Squadron based in Europe flew last ever B-26 Mission May 3, 1945.
  - 322d Bombardment Group, included the 449th, 450th, 451st and 452nd Bomb Squadrons based in European Theater. Transferred from Eighth AF.

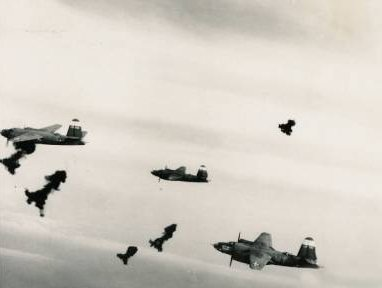
B-26s of the 323d Bomb Group taking flak over France in 1944

  - 323d Bombardment Group, included the 453d, 454th, 455th and 456th Bomb Squadrons based in European Theater.

Transferred from Eighth AF.

  - 344th Bombardment Group, included the 494th, 495th, 496th and 497th Bomb Squadron based in European Theater.

Transferred from Eighth AF.

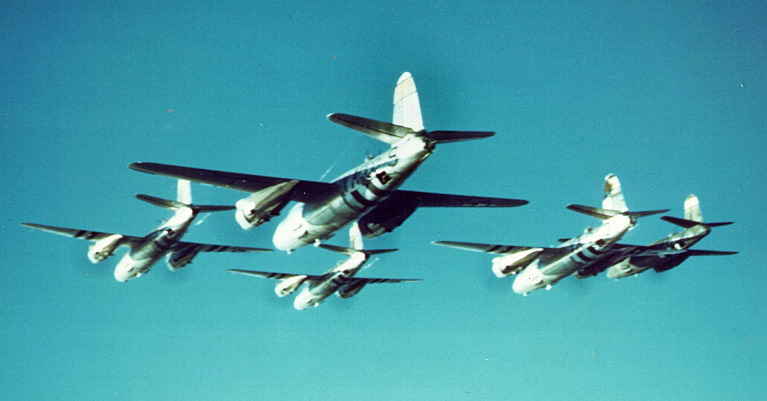
B-26 Marauder of the 555th Bomb Squadron returning to England after a raid over Germany 1944

  - 386th Bombardment Group, included the 552d, 553d, 554th and 555th Bomb Squadrons based in European Theater.
  - 387th Bombardment Group, included the 556th, 557th, 558th and 559th Bomb Squadrons based in European Theater.
  - 391st Bombardment Group, includes the 572d, 573d, 574th and 575th Bomb Squadrons based in European Theater.
  - 394th Bombardment Group, included the 584th, 585th, 586th and 587th Bomb Squadrons based in European Theater.

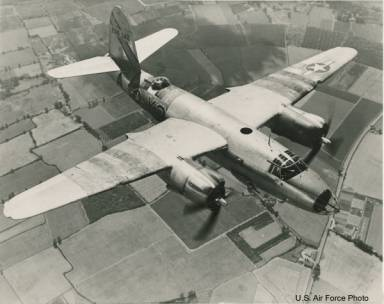
B-26 of the 397th Bomb Group conducting pre D-Day strikes over Normandy

  - 397th Bombardment Group, included the 596th, 597th, 598th and 599th Bomb Squadrons based in European Theater.
  - 410th Bombardment Group, included the 644th, 645th, 646th and 647th Bomb Squadrons based in European Theater.
- Eleventh Air Force
  - 28th Bombardment Group (Composite) included the 73d and 77th Bomb Squadron based in Alaska and the Aleutians.
- Twelfth Air Force
  - 17th Bombardment Group, including the 34th, 37th, 95th and 432d Bomb Squadron based in North Africa and Europe.
  - 319th Bombardment Group, including the 437th, 438th, 439th and 440th Bomb Squadron based in North Africa and Europe.
  - 320th Bombardment Group, including the 441st, 442d, 443d and 444th Bomb Squadrons based in North Africa and Europe.
- Thirteenth Air Force
  - 42d Bombardment Group,

In the South Pacific (POA) the two independent squadrons, formerly of the 38th Bomb Group, USA, were transferred from the Seventh Air Force when the new organization formed. The independent 69th BS & 70BS were assigned layer to the 42nd BG and eventually converted to B-25 aircraft.

  - 21st Bombardment Group (Operational Training Unit) at MacDill Field, Florida, included the 313th, 314th, 315th, 398th Bomb Squadrons.
  - 38th Bombardment Group (Operational Training Unit) included the 69th, 70th, 71st Bomb Squadrons and the 15th Reconnaissance Squadron based in the United States and South-west Pacific.
  - 40th Bombardment Group (Operational Training Unit) included the 25th, 44th, 45th Bomb Squadrons based in the Caribbean.
  - 335th Bombardment Group (Replacement Training Unit) included the 474th, 475th, 476th, 477th Bomb Squadrons based in California, United States.
  - 336th Bombardment Group (Replacement Training Unit) included the 478th, 479th, 480th, 481st Bomb Squadrons based in Louisiana, United States.
- Tow target squadrons
  - 1st Tow Target Squadron
  - 2d Tow Target Squadron
  - 6th Tow Target Squadron
  - 7th Tow Target Squadron
  - 12th Tow Target Squadron
  - 13th Tow Target Squadron
  - 15th Tow Target Squadron
  - 17th Tow Target Squadron
  - 19th Tow Target Squadron
  - 20th Tow Target Squadron
  - 21st Tow Target Squadron
  - 23d Tow Target Squadron
  - 27th Tow Target Squadron
  - 28th Tow Target Squadron
  - 29th Tow Target Squadron

United States Navy

- VJ-1
- VJ-2
- VJ-4
- VJ-7
- VJ-8
- VJ-9
- VJ-10
- VJ-12
- VJ-13
- VJ-14
- VJ-15
- VJ-16
- VJ-17
- VJ-18
- VJ-19
- VD-2 – Placed into operation at the U.S. Naval Air Station, Atlantic Fleet Air Base, Norfolk, Virginia late in 1942, Fleet Air Photographic Reconnaissance VD-2 became a photographic training squadron, which did equipment testing and specialized assignments by direct orders from the Director, of the Photography Division, of the Bureau of Aeronautics, Washington, D.C. This photographic squadron operated from the Atlantic Fleet Air Base at Norfolk during World War II, with a hodge-podge collection of airplanes that were not equipped or suited for overseas war time operations.

United States Marine Corps

- VMJ-1 Commissioned 21 March 1945 at Barking Sands, Kauai, Hawaii as VMTD-1 and on 1 May 1945 was redesignated as VMJ-1 and assigned to the 3rd Marine Division, towing targets for Marine AA batteries over the Hawaiian Islands. The squadron was deactivated on Kauai in October 1945.
- VMJ-2 Commissioned 10 October 1944 at Marine Corps Air Station Ewa, Hawaii as VMTD-2 to train in towing aerial targets and tracking missions for Marine AA batteries. After two months in Hawaii towing for the 5th Marine Division, the entire detachment of 6 JM-1s (Navy Version of the B-26) left 24 November 1944 for Agana, Guam. They daily towed targets and carried out tracking for Army AA units on Guam, Tinian and Saipan. It was redesignated VMJ-2 on 1 May 1945. Following the war, the squadron returned to the West Coast and was deactivated on 6 March 1946.
- VMJ-3 Commissioned 1 October 1944 at the Marine Corps Air Station Ewa, Hawaii as VMTD-3 to provide towing and tracking for Marine AA battalions which had been formerly performed by Navy Squadrons attached to the 3rd Marine Aircraft Wing and operated in practice beach assaults with the 4th Marine Division. The squadron was redesignated VMJ-3 on 1 May 1945 at Ewa. In August 1945 the detachment was sent to Midway to tow for Marine defense battalions. Following the end of the war, the squadron returned to MCAS Ewa and was deactivated in October, 1945.
