= RAF Stansted Mountfitchet =

Former Royal Air Force airbase in Stansted Mountfitchet, Essex, England (1943–1958)

RAF Stansted Mountfitchet
- Near Stansted Mountfitchet, Essex in England
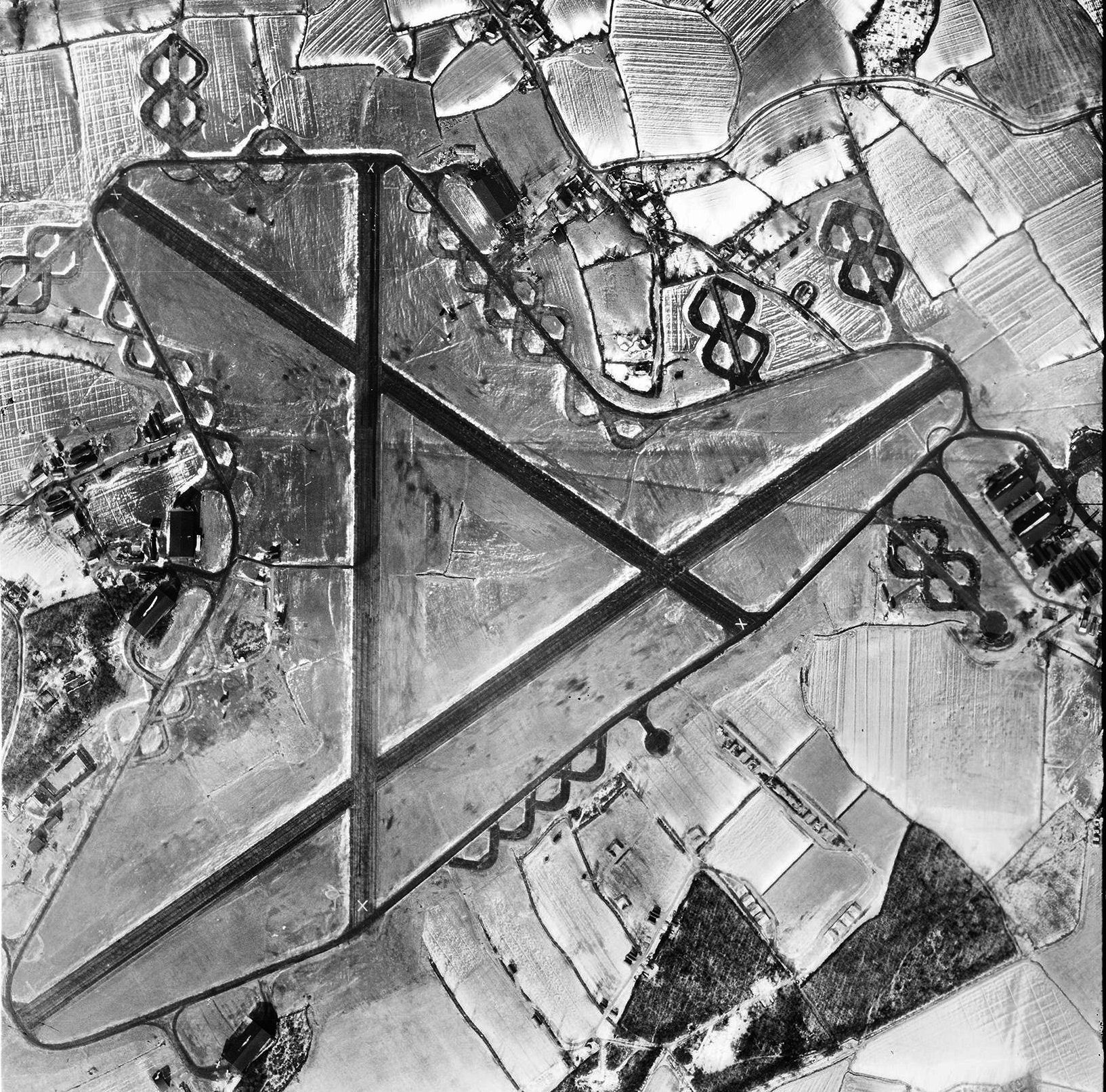
- Aerial photograph of RAF Stansted Mountfitchet looking north after a large snowstorm, 9 January 1947. The bomb dump is at the bottom.

Site information
- Type: Royal Air Force station
- Code: KT
- Owner: Air Ministry
- Operator: Royal Air Force; United States Army Air Forces
- Controlled by: Ninth Air Force

Location
- Coordinates: 51°53′06″N 0°14′06″E

Site history
- Built: 1943
- In use: 1943–1958
- Battles/wars: European theatre of World War II

Airfield information
Runways
Direction	Length and surface
00/00
00/00
00/00

RAF Stansted Mountfitchet is a former Royal Air Force station during the Second World War located near the village of Stansted Mountfitchet in the District of Uttlesford in Essex, 30 miles (48 km) north-east of central London. The airfield is now London Stansted Airport.

== History ==
=== Second World War ===
Construction work began in August 1942 by US Engineers of the 817th Battalion, who were later replaced by the 825th and 850th Battalions, with work being completed in August 1943. Although the official name was Stansted Mountfitchet, the base was, from early in its construction, usually referred to simply as the more manageable Stansted.

==== 344th Bombardment Group ====
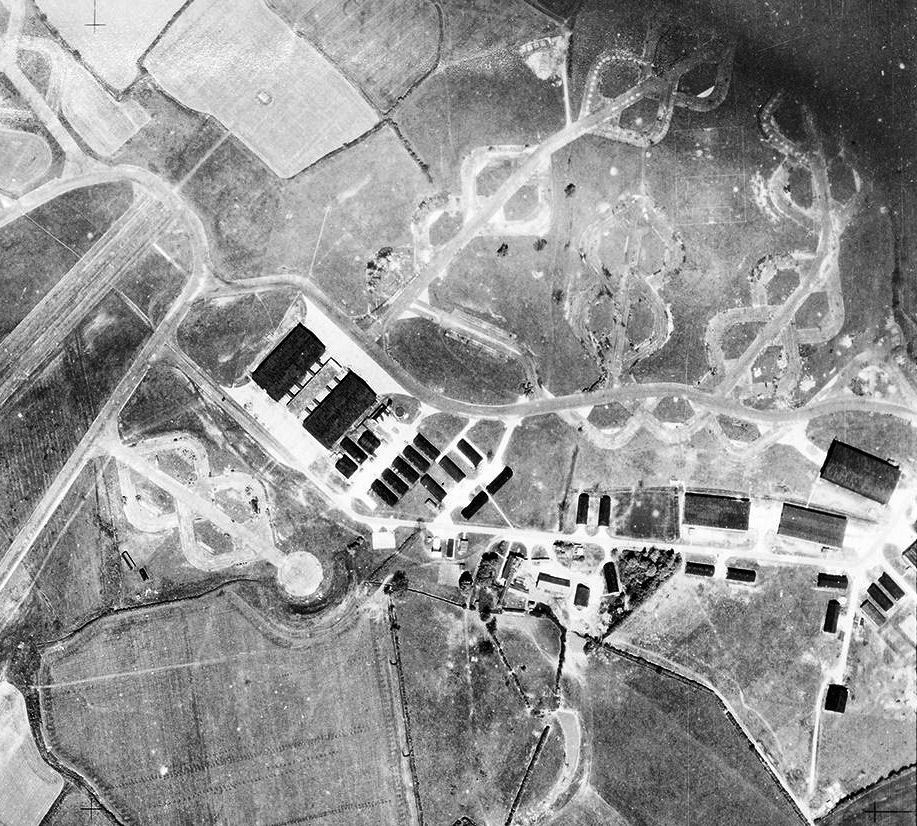
Aerial photograph of the USAAF 2d Tactical Air Depot oriented north, located to the northeast of the Stansted Mountfichet, 8 May 1948

Stansted was officially opened on 7 August 1943 when the 30th Air Depot Group took up residence. The airfield was officially transferred to the Ninth Air Force on 16 October. On 8 February 1944, the first operational squadron arrived at Stansted, the 344th Bombardment Group, transferring in from Hunter Army Airfield in Georgia, USA. The 344th operated the Marauder bomber, and flew their first operational sortie on 6 March 1944. On 6 June 1944, the 344th led the Ninth Air Force on the first bombing mission of D-Day. The 344th left Stansted on 30 September 1944, when they moved to an Advanced Landing Ground at Cormeilles-en-Vexin, France.

==== 2nd Tactical Air Depot ====
Stansted airfield also served as a maintenance and supply depot, working on the Marauder bomber. Following Allied advances in the Normandy campaign, these activities were transferred to France, but Stansted remained in use as a supply storage area for the support of forward-deployed aircraft.

=== Post-war use ===
Following the departure of the USAAF on 12 August 1945, Stansted was taken over by the Air Ministry, who used it both as a storage site (until 1949), and as a prisoner-of-war camp (until 1947).

- No. 263 Maintenance Unit RAF was also here at some point.

The airfield passed to the Ministry of Civil Aviation in 1949. In 1954, work was undertaken to prepare the airfield for a return to military usage, including the extension of runways, however these plans fell through, and in 1966 control passed to the newly-formed British Airports Authority.
