= 19th Air Division =

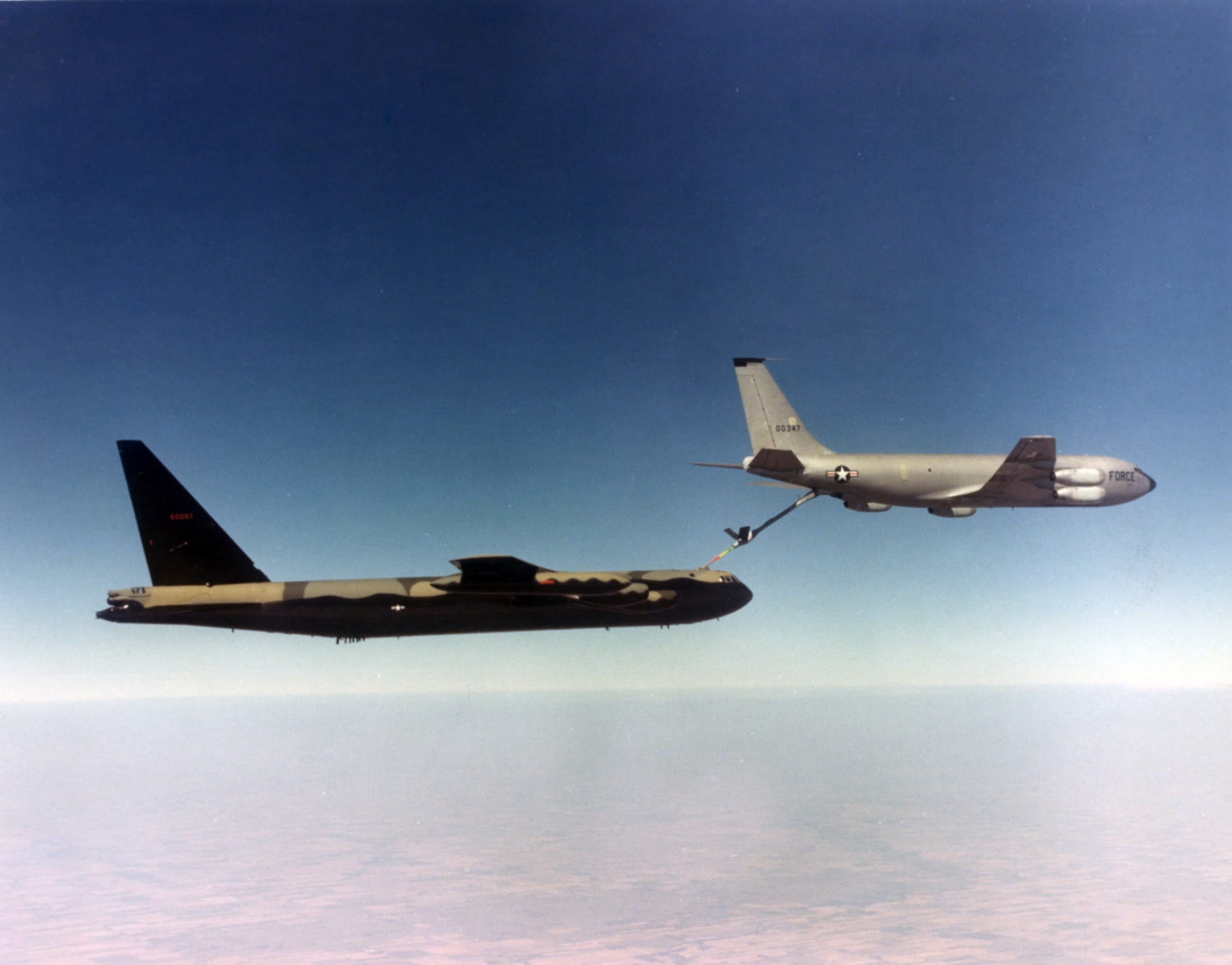
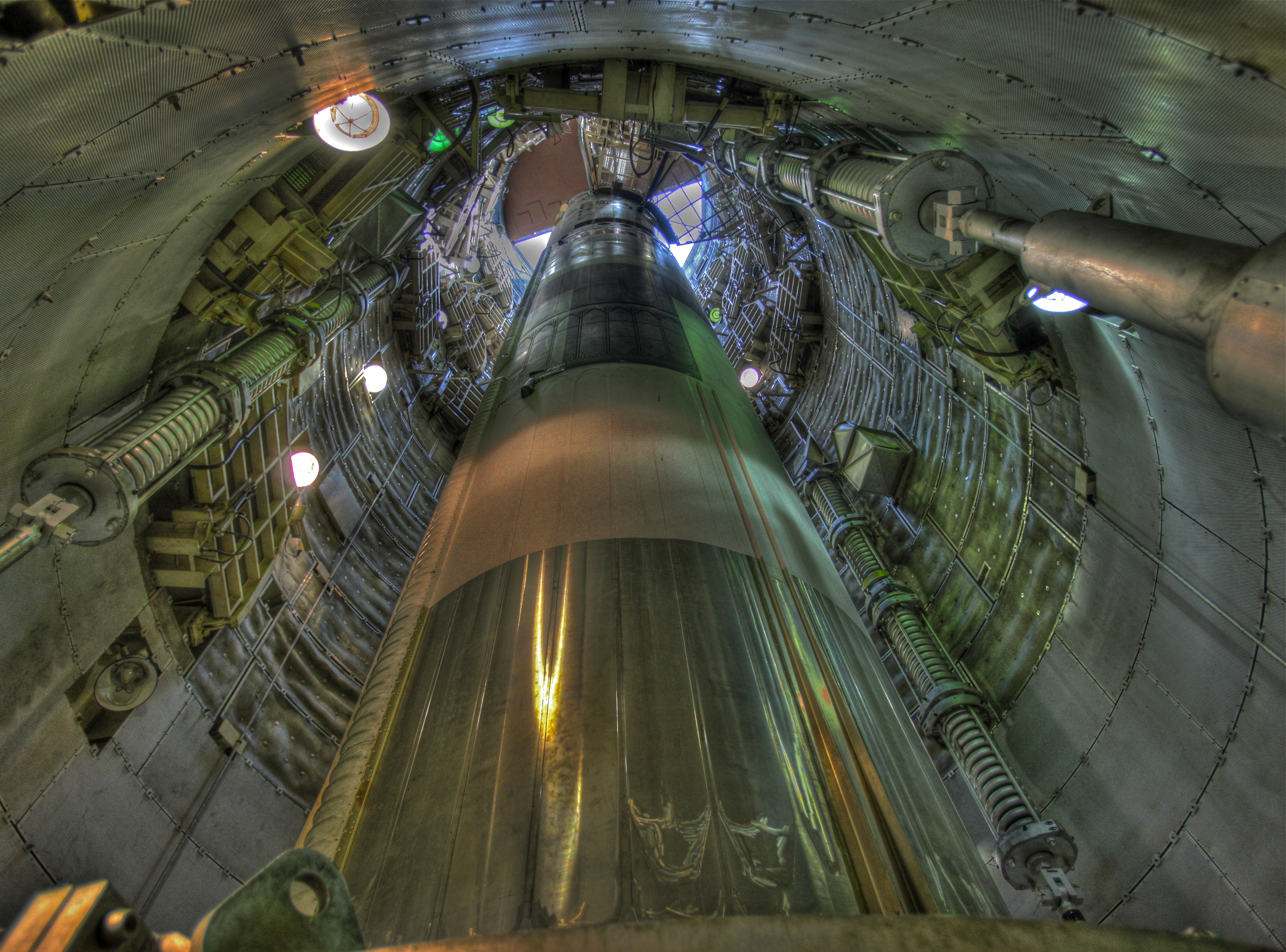
- Boeing KC-135 Stratotanker refueling a B-52D Stratofortress LGM-25C Titan II in its launch silo. During the 1970s and 1980s the 19th Air Division controlled two ICBM Wings
- Active: 1929–1941; 1942–1945; 1946–1949; 1951–1988
- Country: United States
- Branch: United States Air Force
- Role: Command of strategic strike forces
- Equipment: see "Aircraft / Missiles" section below

Commanders
- Notable commanders: George H. Brett Herbert A. Dargue

Insignia
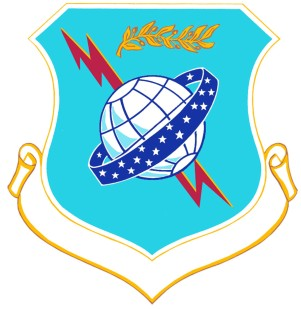
- 19th Air Division emblem (Note: Approved 11 May 1959, Description: Azure, surmounting a lightning flash gules a globe argent with longitude and latitude lines dark blue and encircled with a planetary ring of the last [color mentioned] strewn with stars of the third [color mentioned] and fimbriated of the like [color] all bendwise, in chief an olive branch fesswise or, all within a diminished border of the third [color mentioned].)

The 19th Air Division is an inactive United States Air Force formation. Its last assignment was with Eighth Air Force at Carswell Air Force Base, Texas, where it was inactivated on 30 September 1988.

During World War II, the unit was designated as IX Bomber Command and was the command and control organization for Ninth Air Force in the Western Desert Campaign. Using predominantly B-24 Liberator heavy and B-25 Mitchell medium bombers, it supported the British Eighth Army against the German Afrika Korps from airfields ranging from Palestine in 1942 across North Africa to the final defeat of German forces in the Tunisia Campaign in May 1943.

Later, during the 1944 Battle of Normandy and the 1945 Western Allied invasion of Germany, as the 9th Bombardment Division, the unit directed Martin B-26 Marauder medium bombers in tactical roles supporting Allied ground forces from D-Day to V-E Day.

== Heraldry ==
Azure, surmounting a lightning flash gules, a globe argent with latitude and longitude lines dark blue and encircled with a planetary ring of the last strewn with stars of the third and fimbriated of the like all bandwise, in chief an olive branch fesswise or, all within a diminished border of the third. (Approved 11 March 1959.)

== History ==
=== Canal Zone ===
The 19th Air Division was first organized on 30 June 1929 as the 19th Composite Wing at France Field, Canal Zone. It was a consolidation of Air Corps units in the Canal Zone, and was activated on 1 April 1931. It consisted of the following units:

- 6th (Composite) (later, 6 Bombardment Group): 1 April 1931 – 25 October 1941 (France Field)
- 9th Bombardment Group: 12 November 1940 – 30 October 1941 (Rio Hato Field)
- 16th Pursuit Group: 1 December 1932 – c. 19 October 1940 (Albrook Field)
- 20th Pursuit Group: 1 April 1931 – c. 25 January 1933 (France Field – Deployed from Mather Field, California)
- 37th Pursuit Group: 1 February – c. 19 November 1940 (Albrook Field)

During the 1930s the 19th Wing participated in maneuvers, flew patrol missions, made good will flights to Central American and South American countries, and flew mercy missions in South America. In January 1939, it flew missions to aid earthquake victims in Santiago, Chile.

It was redesignated as the 19th Bombardment Wing on 19 October 1940 as the United States prepared for a possible war. By late August 1941, a total of 71 aircraft, consisting of B-18 Bolos; B-17B Flying Fortresses; A-20 Havocs, and A-17A Nomads were assigned to various groups under its control.

It was replaced by the 13th Bombardment Wing in an administrative reorganization of the Panama Canal Air Force on 25 October 1941.

=== World War II ===
Reactivated as IX Bomber Command, the unit was assigned to Ninth Air Force in Egypt on 17 November 1942. Its component groups were:

- 12th Bombardment Group: c. 17 November 1942 – c. 1 November 1943, B-25 Mitchell
- 98th Bombardment Group: c. 17 November 1942 – c. 13 September 1943, Consolidated B-24 Liberator
- 321st Bombardment Group: 22 July – c. 28 September 1943, B-25 Mitchell
- 376th Bombardment Group: 17 November 1942 – 13 September 1943, B-17D Flying Fortress; B-24 Liberator. Formed from HALPRO components along with personnel and equipment sent from Tenth Air Force. The B-17s which were assigned were determined to be non-operational and never used in combat.

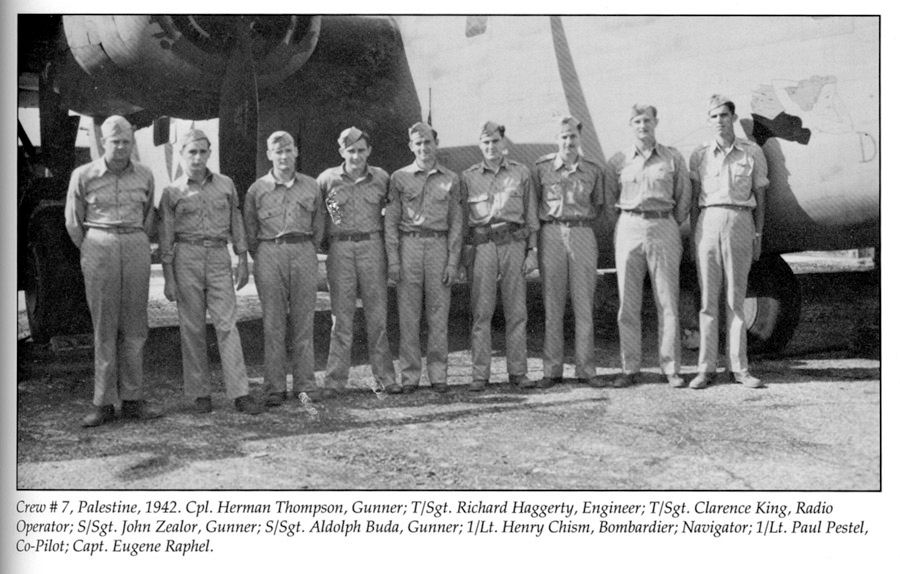
98th Bombardment Group B-24D Liberator crew at RAF Ramat David, British Palestine, 1942

IX Bomber Command was quickly put together in late 1942 to aid the British Eighth Army's drive west from Egypt into Libya against General Rommel's Afrika Corps during the Western Desert Campaign. It consisted of units and aircraft put together for an attack on Japan which was canceled after the Burma Road was captured by Japanese forces, making its planned base in China unable to support the attack (HALPRO Mission); by Pearl Harbor Attack and Philippines survivor early model B-17 Flying Fortresses that had been sent from Australia, and by some early B-24 Liberator and B-25 Mitchells which were sent across the South Atlantic Transport route from Morrison Field, Florida, via Brazil and across Central Africa via Sudan.

The United States Army Air Forces (USAAF) began planning for a buildup of American air power in the Middle East in January 1942 in response to a request from the British Chief of the Air Staff. The initial unit to arrive was given the codename "Halverson Project" (HALPRO). It was under the command of Colonel Harry A. Halverson (formerly Brig Gen Billy Mitchell's Executive Officer) and consisted of twenty-three B-24D Liberator heavy bombers with hand-picked crews. It had initially been assigned to the China Burma India Theatre to attack Japan from airfields in China, but after the fall of Rangoon, the Burma Road was cut, so the detachment could not be logistically supported in China.

HALPRO's first mission was flown on 12 June 1942 against the Romanian oil facilities at Ploieşti. Thirteen B-24s flew this first U.S. mission against a European target, causing negligible damage. On 15 June, seven planes assisted the Royal Air Force (RAF) in attacking an Italian fleet which had put to sea to intercept a British resupply convoy (Operation Vigorous) on its way to Malta. HALPRO then flew in support of British Commonwealth forces fighting in the Western Desert of Egypt and Libya. HALPRO's primary mission became the interdiction of supplies to Rommel's Army in North Africa by bombing strikes on Axis cargo ships at sea or in the ports of Tobruk and Benghazi.

Reinforced during early 1943, its subordinate units attacked enemy storage areas, motor transports, troop concentrations, airdromes, bridges, shipping, and other targets in Libya, Tunisia, and other areas. In May 1943 after the Tunisian Campaign ended, Tunisia became available for launching attacks on Pantelleria (Operation Corkscrew), Sicily (Operation Husky), and mainland Italy.

The command attacked airfields and rail facilities in Sicily and took part in Operation Husky, carried paratroopers, and flew reinforcements to ground units on the island. Heavy bomb units of the Ninth also participated in Operation Tidal Wave, the famed low-level assault on oil refineries at Ploesti, Romania on 1 August 1943.

Later in August 1943, it was decided to reassign Ninth Air Force to England to be the tactical air force in the planned invasion of France scheduled for May 1944. The IX Bomber Command reassigned its groups to Twelfth Air Force, and eventually its heavy bombardment groups became the core of the newly activated Fifteenth Air Force, while its B-25 Mitchell medium bomber groups remained with Twelfth Air Force.

The command's headquarters at Soluch Airfield, Libya, was inactivated on 1 October 1943.

==== Normandy Campaign ====
The IX Bomber Command was reassigned to Marks Hall, England on 16 October 1943. It took over the 3rd Bombardment Wing of the Eighth Air Force VIII Air Support Command. It was expanded and consisted of three Wings of medium bomber groups:

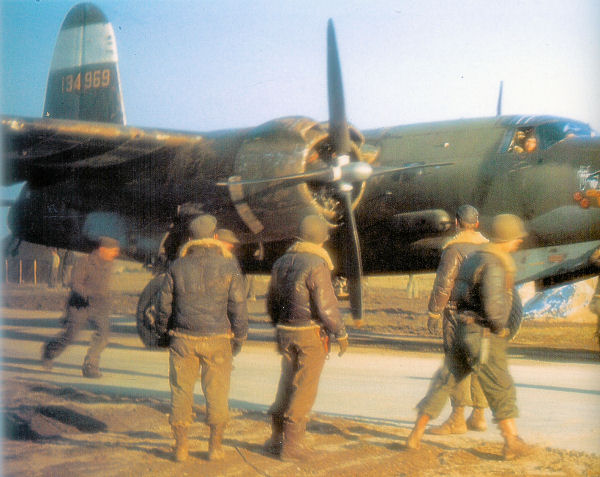
323d Bomb Group airmen attend to a Martin B-26C (Note: The aircraft is Martin B-26C-15-MO Marauder Serial 41-34969. This aircraft went on to survive the war with over 150 missions to its credit.)

- 97th Bombardment Wing: 12 November 1943 – 11 October 1945

409th Bombardment Group: 7 March 1944 – June 1945 (A-20 Havoc, A-26 Invader)
410th Bombardment Group: 4 April 1944 – June 1945 (A-20 Havoc, A-26 Invader)
416th Bombardment Group: February 1944 – July 1945 (A-20 Havoc, A-26 Invader)

- 98th Bombardment Wing (Formerly 3d Bombardment Wing): 16 October 1943 – 27 November 1945

323d Bombardment Group: 16 October 1943 – 16 July 1945 (B-26 Marauder)
387th Bombardment Group: 16 October 1943 – November 1945 (B-26 Marauder)
394th Bombardment Group: 11 March 1944 – September 1945 (B-26 Marauder)
397th Bombardment Group: 15 April 1944 – November 1945 (B-26 Marauder)

- 99th Bombardment Wing (Formerly 44th Bombardment Wing): 16 October 1943 – 4 October 1945

322d Bombardment Group: 16 October 1943 – 15 September 1945 (B-26 Marauder)
344th Bombardment Group: 16 October 1943 – 15 September 1945 (B-26 Marauder)
386th Bombardment Group: 16 October 1943 – 27 July 1945 (B-26 Marauder)
391st Bombardment Group: 25 January 1944 – 27 July 1945 (B-26 Marauder)

In the United Kingdom, and later on the continent after D-Day, IX Bomber Command became the medium bomber component of Ninth Air Force. Its initial mission was attack to German Atlantic Wall defenses along the English Channel coast of France. After D-Day, its primary mission was changed to fly tactical bombardment missions supporting Allied ground forces as they advanced from the Normandy Beaches across France into Germany.

In addition, it attacked enemy airfields in Nazi-occupied areas in support of Eighth Air Force strategic bombing missions as well as operations against German V-weapon sites. Additional missions involved attacks on rail marshaling yards, railroads, airfields, industrial plants, military installations, and other enemy targets in France, Belgium, and the Netherlands.

It was redesignated as the 9th Bombardment Division, Medium on 30 August 1944. The last combat missions was flown on 3 May 1945 by the 386th, 391st, 409th & 410th Bomb Groups.

=== Air Force Reserve ===
Redesignated as the 19th Bombardment Wing, it served another brief period with the reserve from 1946 to 1949, carrying out routine training activities.

=== Strategic Air Command ===
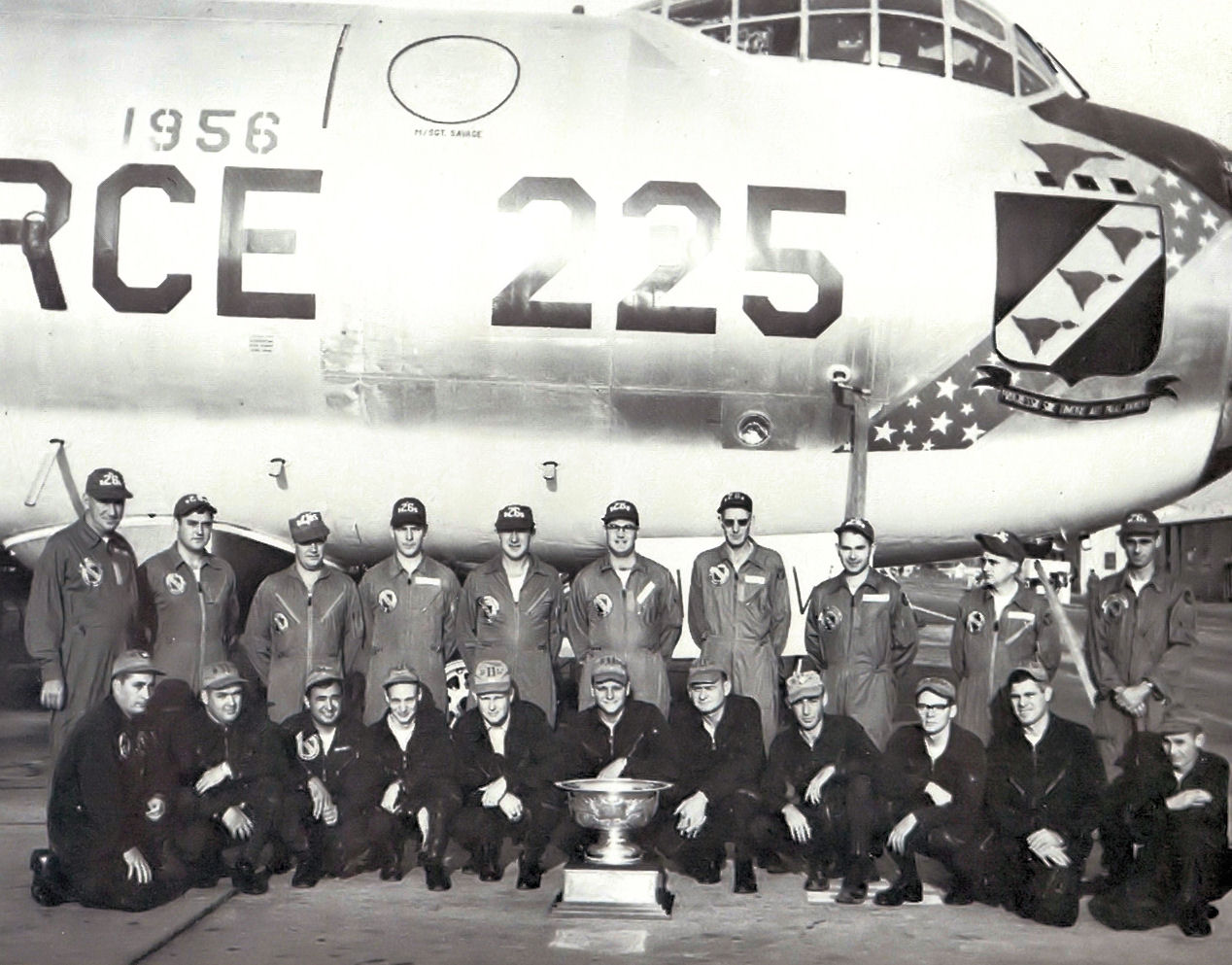
1956 Fairchild Trophy winners of the 11th Bombardment Wing and Convair B-36J

It was redesignated again and activated at Carswell Air Force Base, Texas in February 1951 as the 19th Air Division, part of Strategic Air Command (SAC). It commanded the two Convair B-36 Peacemaker wings at Carswell, the 7th and 11th Bombardment Wings. By September 1952, the B-36s assigned to the 7th and 11th Wings comprised two thirds of SAC's intercontinental bomber force. These same units were later equipped with B-52 Stratofortress and KC-135 Stratotanker aircraft training in global strategic-bombardment and air-refueling operations.

On 1 September 1952, what was then thought to be a tornado rolled across the Carswell flight line, with winds over 90 miles per hour recorded at the control tower. By the time it had passed "the flight line was a tangle of airplanes, equipment and pieces of buildings." None of the 82 bombers on the base escaped damage, and SAC declared the division non-operational. Maintenance personnel of the 7th and 11th Wings went on an 84-hour weekly work schedule and began to restore the least damaged aircraft to operational status. More heavily damaged aircraft were worked on by personnel from the San Antonio Air Materiel Area, where the depot for the B-36 was located. The planes that had been most heavily damaged were towed across the field to the Convair plant where they had been manufactured. Within a month, 51 of the base's Peacemakers had been returned to service and the division was again declared operational. By May 1953, all but two of the planes had been returned to service. (Note: One plane was written off, another was bailed to Convair to be used for experiments with nuclear power. McGowan, p. 65.)

In 1959, the 3958th Operational Training and Evaluation Squadron was reassigned to the division from SAC headquarters. At the same time the squadron was upgraded to a group and assigned the 3958th Combat Crew Training Squadron and the 3958th Consolidated Aircraft Maintenance Squadron.

The 3958th, along with its counterpart 6592d Test Squadron of Air Research and Development Command, representatives of Air Materiel Command, Convair and other contractors formed the Convair B-58 Hustler test force, and, at the time of the 3958th's transfer, was involved in Category II testing of the B-58. This testing phase included tests of aircraft subsystems and its J79 engines. Before Category II tests were completed, seven aircraft were lost.

Category II tests, led by the 6592d, were completed by the end of June 1960, and, Category III tests (operational testing) began in August. These tests were conducted primarily by the division's 43d Bombardment Wing (Carswell AFB, Ft. Worth, Texas) with the technical assistance of the remainder of test force. In anticipation of its expanded testing and crew-training mission for the Hustler, SAC had inactivated the 3958th and transferred its mission, personnel and equipment to the 43d Bomb Wing.

In January 1967, the division began deploying B-52 aircraft and aircrews to Southeast Asia for combat operations, continuing until 1973. In 1975, the 19th provided air-refueling support for the evacuation of Vietnamese and Americans from South Vietnam. With the end of the Vietnam War, the division began transitioning control of most of its B-52 wings (with the exception of the 7th Bombardment Wing at Carswell AFB) into KC-135 Stratotanker air refueling and LGM-25C Titan II ICBM wings.

With the retirement of the Titan II in 1987, the 19th Air Division was itself inactivated in September 1988.

== Lineage ==
- Constituted as the 19th Composite Wing on 8 May 1929

Activated on 1 April 1931
Redesignated 19th Wing on 14 July 1937
Redesignated 19th Bombardment Wing on 19 October 1940
Inactivated on 25 October 1941

- Activated on 24 July 1942

Redesignated IX Bomber Command on 17 November 1942
Redesignated 9th Bombardment Division, Medium on 30 August 1944
Redesignated 9th Air Division on 10 May 1945
Inactivated on 20 November 1945

- Activated in the Reserve on 20 December 1946

Redesignated 19th Bombardment Wing, Very Heavy on 31 December 1946
Redesignated 19th Air Division, Bombardment on 16 April 1948
Inactivated on 27 June 1949

- Redesignated 19th Air Division on 1 February 1951

Organized on 16 February 1951
Discontinued on 16 June 1952

- Activated on 16 June 1952

Inactivated on 30 September 1988

=== Assignments ===
- Second Corps Area, 1 April 1931
- Panama Canal Department, c. 25 January 1933 – 25 October 1941
- Ninth Air Force, 24 July 1942 – 20 November 1945

Attached to: III Fighter Command, 24 July-c. 28 September 1942

- Fourteenth Air Force, 20 December 1946
- Ninth Air Force, 22 December 1948
- Fourteenth Air Force, 1 February – 27 June 1949
- Eighth Air Force, 16 February 1951 – 16 June 1952
- Eighth Air Force, 16 June 1952
- Second Air Force, 1 July 1955
- Eighth Air Force, 1 January 1975 – 30 September 1988

=== Components ===
Wings

- 2d Bombardment Wing: 1 September 1964 – 1 July 1965; 2 July 1969 – 1 December 1982
- 7th Bombardment Wing: 16 February 1951 – 13 June 1988 (detached 10 July – 13 September 1955)
- 11th Bombardment Wing (later 11th Strategic Aerospace Wing, 11th Air Refueling Wing): 16 February 1951 – 13 December 1957 (detached 4 May – 2 July 1955); 2 July 1966 – 25 March 1969
- 43d Bombardment Wing: 15 March 1960 – 1 September 1964 (detached 19–31 August 1964)
- 44th Bombardment Wing (later 99th Combat Bombardment Wing: c. 16 October 1943 – 16 September 1945
- 96th Strategic Aerospace Wing (later 96th Bombardment Wing): 2 July 1966 – 1 July 1973
- 97th Bombardment Wing: 12 November 1943 – 11 October 1945
- 98th Bombardment Wing (Formerly 3d Bombardment Wing): 16 October 1943 – 27 November 1945
- 305th Bombardment Wing: 1 January 1961 – 1 September 1964
- 308th Strategic Missile Wing: 1 December 1982 – 18 August 1987
- 340th Bombardment Wing (later 340th Air Refueling Wing): 1 September 1964 – 2 October 1966; 2 July 1968 – 31 December 1971; 1 July 1977 – 16 June 1988
- 381st Strategic Missile Wing: 1 July 1973 – 8 August 1986
- 384th Air Refueling Wing: 1 July 1973 – 1 July 1987
- 461st Bombardment Wing: 2 July 1966 – 25 March 1968
- 494th Bombardment Wing: 1 October 1965 – 2 April 1966
- 4123d Strategic Wing: 10 December 1957 – 1 March 1959
- 4130th Strategic Wing: 1 October 1958 – 1 July 1963

Groups

- 6th Composite Group (later 6th Bombardment Group): 25 January 1933 – 35 October 1941
- 322d Bombardment Group: assigned 16 October – 17 November 1943; attached 17 November 1943 − 1 April 1944, 23−28 September 1944
- 340th Air Refueling Group: 2 July 1968 – 16 June 1988
- 386th Bombardment Group, 16 October – 5 December 1943
- 410th Bombardment Group, operational control 11−18 September 1944
- 416th Bombardment Group, assigned c. 1−4 February 1944; operational control 11−18 September 1944
- 3958th Operational Evaluation and Training Group (B-58): 1 September 1959 – 15 March 1960

Squadrons

- 11th Air Refueling Squadron: 25 March – 2 July 1969; 30 June 1971 – 1 July 1977
- 3958th Operational Evaluation and Training Squadron (B-58): 11 August 1958 – 1 September 1959
- 4007th Combat Crew Training Squadron: 2 June – 2 July 1968
- 4017th Training Squadron (B-36 Transition): 17 December 1951 – 1 January 1954

=== Stations ===
- France Field, Panama Canal Zone, 1 April 1931
- Albrook Field, Panama Canal Zone, 25 January 1933 – 25 October 1941
- MacDill Field, Florida, 24 July – 28 September 1942
- Payne Airfield, Egypt, 11 November 1942
- Ismailia Airfield, Egypt, 12 November 1942
- Soluch Airfield, Libya, 15 February – 1 October 1943
- Marks Hall, England, 6 November 1943
- Chartres Airfield (A-40), France, 18 September 1944
- Reims-Champagne Airfield, France (A-62), October 1944
- Namur Airfield (Y-47), Belgium, April-20 November 1945
- Birmingham Army Air Base, Alabama, 20 December 1946 – 27 June 1949
- Carswell Air Force Base, Texas, 16 February 1951 – 16 June 1952; 16 June 1952 – 30 September 1988

=== Aircraft / Missiles ===
- Airco DH-4, 1931
- Boeing P-12, 1931–1939
- Berliner-Joyce P-16, 1932
- Boeing P-26 Peashooter, 1934–1940
- Martin B-10, 1936–1939
- Curtiss P-36 Hawk, 1936–1940
- Consolidated PB-2, 1936–1937;
- Seversky P-35, 1938–1939
- Douglas B-18 Bolo, 1939–1941
- Lockheed C-40 Electra, 1939–1940
- Republic YP-43 Lancer, 1939–1940
- Curtiss P-40 Warhawk, 1940
- Boeing B-17 Flying Fortress, 1941–1943, 1945
- Consolidated B-24 Liberator, 1942–1943
- North American B-25 Mitchell, 1942–1943
- Martin B-26 Marauder, 1942–1945
- Douglas A-20 Havoc, 1943–1945
- Douglas A-26 Invader, 1944–1945
- Boeing B-29 Superfortress, 1947–1949
- Convair B-36 Peacemaker, 1951–1952, 1952–1957
- Convair YRB-58 Hustler, 1960
- Convair B-58 Hustler, 1960–1964
- Convair TB-58 Hustler, 1960–1964
- Convair TF-102 Delta Dagger, 1960–1962
- Boeing B-52 Stratofortress, 1963–1988
- Boeing KC-135 Stratotanker, 1963–1988
- LGM-25C Titan II, 1973–1987
- LGM-30F Minuteman II, 1982–1988

== See also ==
- List of United States Air Force air divisions
