= RAF Beaulieu =

Former Royal Air Force station in Hampshire, England

RAF Beaulieu; USAAF Station AAF-408;
- Near Beaulieu, Hampshire in England
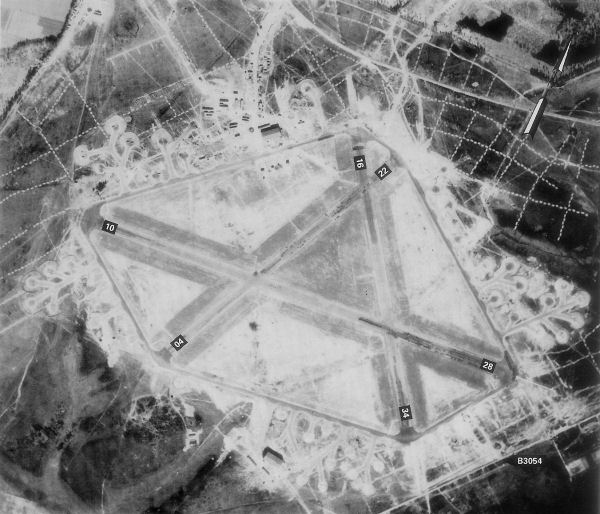
- Beaulieu airfield on 4 March 1944, just after the 365th Fighter Group arrived.

Site information
- Type: Royal Air Force station
- Code: BQ/BL
- Owner: Air Ministry
- Operator: Royal Air Force; United States Army Air Forces
- Controlled by: RAF Coastal Command 1942–44; * No. 19 Group RAF; Second Tactical Air Force 1944; Air Defence of Great Britain 1944; * No. 10 Group RAF; Ninth Air Force 1944

Location
- Shown within Hampshire RAF Beaulieu (the United Kingdom)
- Coordinates: 50°48′27″N 001°30′17″W

Site history
- Built: 1942
- In use: August 1942 – September 1950
- Battles/wars: European theatre of World War II

Airfield information
- Elevation: 135 feet (41 m) AMSL
Runways
| Direction | Length and surface |
|---|---|
| 04/22 | 1,700 metres (5,577 ft) Grass |
| 10/28 | 1,200 metres (3,937 ft) Grass |
| 16/34 | 1,200 metres (3,937 ft) Grass |

Royal Air Force Beaulieu or more simply RAF Beaulieu (/ˈbjuːli/ BEW-lee) is a former Royal Air Force station in the New Forest, Hampshire, England. It was also known as Beaulieu airfield, Beaulieu aerodrome and USAAF Station AAF 408. It is located on Hatchet Moor 1 mile (2 km) west of the village of East Boldre, about 2 miles (3 km) west-southwest of the village of Beaulieu and 4 miles (6 km) north-east of Lymington.

During the First World War there was a Royal Flying Corps training airfield, RFC Beaulieu, at East Boldre that was closed in 1919

The new RAF Beaulieu, opened on 8 August 1942, was built on the opposite side of the road. It was used by both the Royal Air Force and then later United States Army Air Forces. During the war it was used as a bomber and fighter airfield. After the war, it was used for experimental work before it was closed in 1959.

Today the remains of the airfield are on heathland managed by the Forestry Commission. Areas of the old airfield are now designated as a flying area for model aircraft.

== History ==
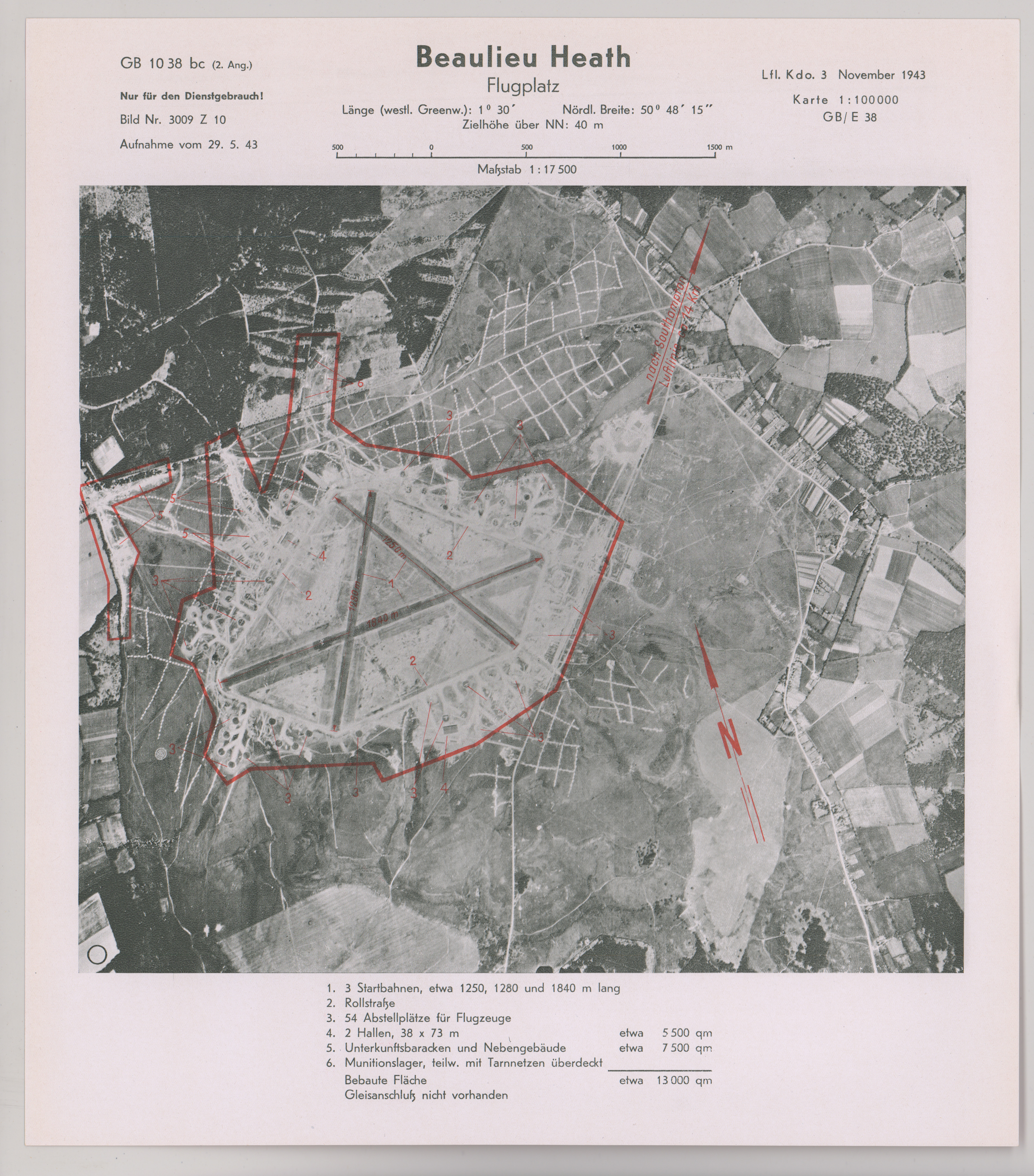
RAF Beaulieu on a target dossier of the German Luftwaffe, 1943

=== Royal Air Force use ===
The new airfield was opened on 8 August 1942, as a RAF Coastal Command base intended to accommodate two General Reconnaissance squadrons, and its first unit, the Consolidated Liberator-equipped 224 Squadron moved in on 9 September 1942. The crucial situation in the Battle of the Atlantic meant that RAF Bomber Command had to loan squadrons of bombers to Coastal Command to aid in the anti-submarine effort, and on 25 October 1942, the Handley Page Halifax-equipped 405 Squadron of the Royal Canadian Air Force, together with a flight of five more Halifaxes of 158 Squadron arrived at Beaulieu, supplementing 224's Halifaxes in anti-submarine patrols. The flight from 158 Squadron moved to RAF Rufforth in December 1942, but 405 Squadron remained at Beaulieu on Coastal Command duties until March 1943. A Liberator-equipped conversion flight of 1 (Coastal) Operational Training Unit moved to the airfield in March 1943, and in May that year, the Czechoslovak-manned 311 Squadron replaced 224 Squadron, which moved to RAF St Eval. Liberator-equipped 53 Squadron arrived on 25 September 1943, joining 311 Squadron for anti-submarine patrols over the Bay of Biscay.

In early 1944, No. 146 Airfield Headquarters arrived at Beaulieu, together with two (257 (Burma) and 263 (Fellowship of the Bellows) Squadrons) of the unit's three fighter squadrons, both equipped with the Hawker Typhoon, which displaced the Liberators. No. 486 Squadron RNZAF later replaced 257 Squadron at Beaulieu. The Typhoons moved out in March 1944 to allow the airfield to be used by units of the US Army Air Force.

The airfield was used by the following units:

- Liberator Conversion Flight of No. 1 (Coastal) Operational Training Unit RAF (March–September 1943)
- No. 53 Squadron RAF (1943–44)
- A detachment of No. 88 (Hong Kong) Squadron RAF (1943)
- No. 146 Airfield Headquarters RAF(February–April 1944)
- A detachment of No. 158 Squadron RAF (1942)
- No. 224 Squadron RAF (1942–43)
- No. 257 (Burma) Squadron RAF (1944)
- No. 263 (Fellowship of the Bellows) Squadron RAF (1944)
- No. 311 (Czechoslovak) Squadron RAF (1943–44)
- No. 405 Squadron RCAF (1942–43)
- No. 486 Squadron RNZAF (1944)
- A detachment of No. 657 Squadron RAF (1947–48)
- No. 1901 Air Observation Post Flight RAF (1947–48)
- No. 2741 Squadron RAF Regiment
- No. 2762 Squadron RAF Regiment
- No. 2854 Squadron RAF Regiment

=== USAAF use ===
For security reasons, the USAAF referred to Beaulieu as Station AAF 408 during the war. Its Pundit Code was "BL".

==== 365th Fighter Group ====
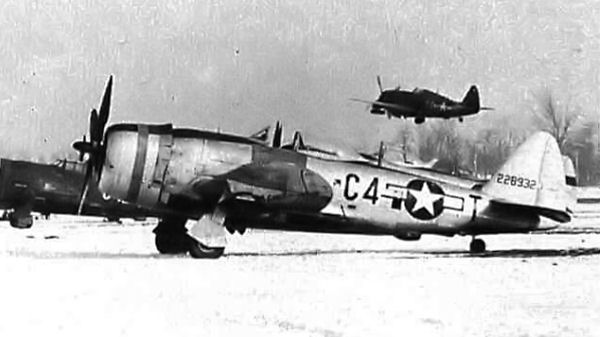
Republic P-47D-28-RA Thunderbolt, AAF Ser. No. 42-28932, of the 388th Fighter Squadron.

In March 1944 Beaulieu airfield was made available for USAAF Ninth Air Force use. The headquarters of the 84th Fighter Wing moved in on 4 March, while the 365th Fighter Group arrived from RAF Gosfield on 5 March 1944.

The 365th was a Republic P-47 Thunderbolt group, with the following operational squadrons:

- 386th Fighter Squadron (D5)
- 387th Fighter Squadron (B4)
- 388th Fighter Squadron (C4)

The 365th was a group of Ninth Air Force's 84th Fighter Wing, IX Tactical Air Command. The 365th Group began its move to Europe on 21 June 1944, the first squadron taking up residence at a temporary airfield Advanced Landing Ground A-7 Azeville, France on 26 June.

==== 323d Bombardment Group ====
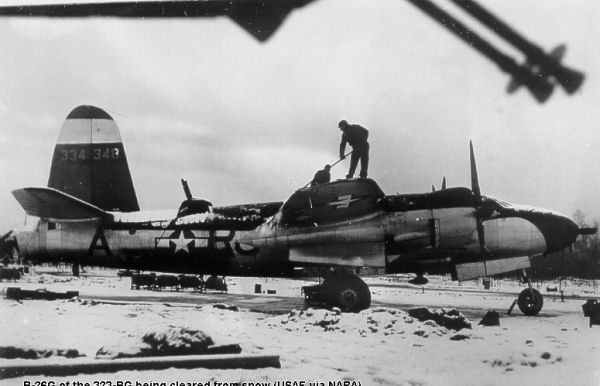
Martin B-26G-5-MA Marauder the 454th Bomb Squadron at RAF Beaulieu

Between 1 and 21 July the Martin B-26 Marauders of the 323d Bombardment Group arrived from RAF Earls Colne. The group was assigned to the 3d Bombardment Wing with a Horizontal white tail band for its group marking. Operational squadrons of the 323d were:

- 453d Bombardment Squadron (VT)
- 454th Bombardment Squadron (RJ)
- 455th Bombardment Squadron (YU)
- 456th Bombardment Squadron (WT)

Between 16 and 26 August, the 323d moved to Lessay airfield in France (A-20).

=== Postwar military use ===
In December 1944, the Airborne Forces Experimental Establishment (AFEE) moved to the airfield, where it remained for nearly six years using a variety of aircraft, including unusual ones such as the General Aircraft GAL.55 glider "Trixie" — the nickname derived from its Air Ministry Specification "TX.3/43", the Supermarine Type 322 "Dumbo", the Hafner Rotachute and Rotabuggy, and the Hamilcar X, along with various Handley Page Halifaxes used for supply-dropping experiments. The AFEE was involved in experimental work with glider towing and parachute drops, using the former East Boldre Airfield site on the far side of the Lymington-Beaulieu road as a drop zone.

On 14 September 1950, AFEE was disbanded, and most of its equipment and personnel were transferred to the Aeroplane and Armament Experimental Establishment at RAF Boscombe Down. Helicopter training functions were transferred to RAF Andover. Beaulieu airfield was then without any flying units, placed under Care and Maintenance status, and then declared inactive. On 1 April 1953 control passed once again to the United States Air Force, and the facility was upgraded, but in the event no further flying units arrived.

Finally, on 8 September 1955 Beaulieu airfield was handed back to the Air Ministry, in whose care it remained until November 1959 when it relinquished control of the land.

== Current use ==
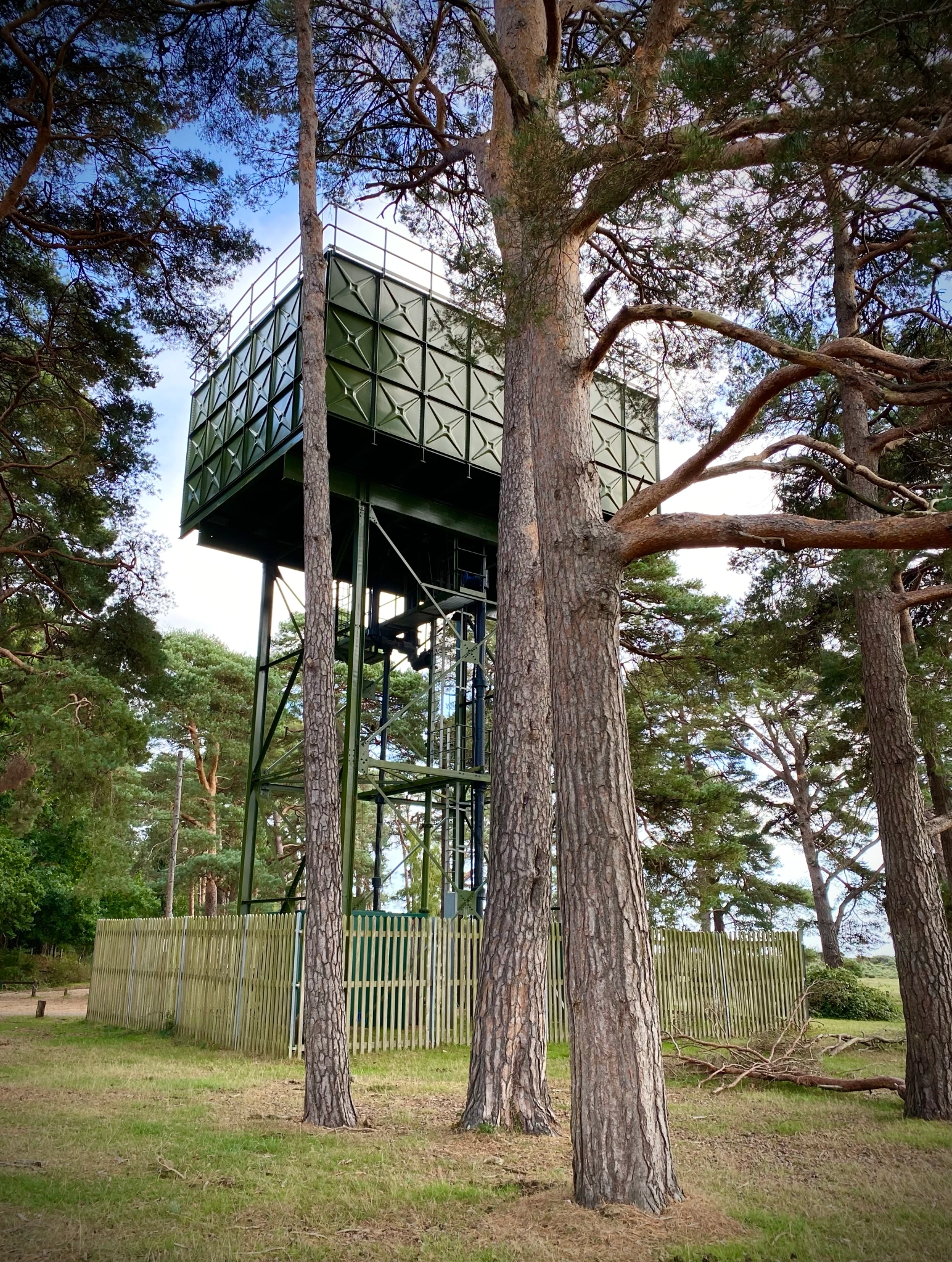
Remaining WW2 Water tower situated in Roundhill Campsite

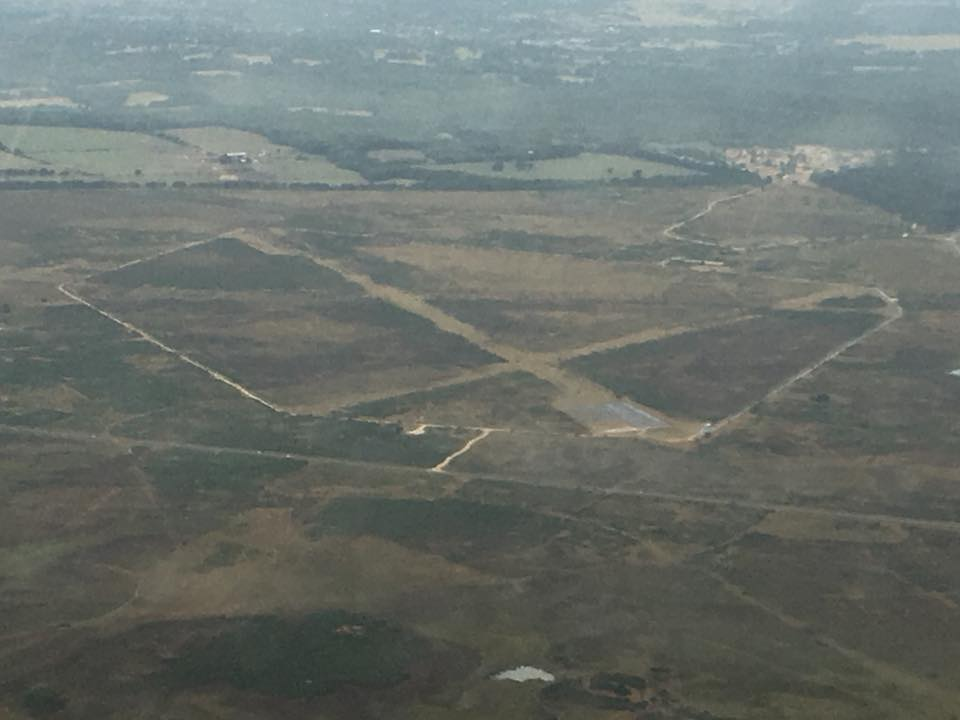
Aerial view of RAF Beaulieu (2018)

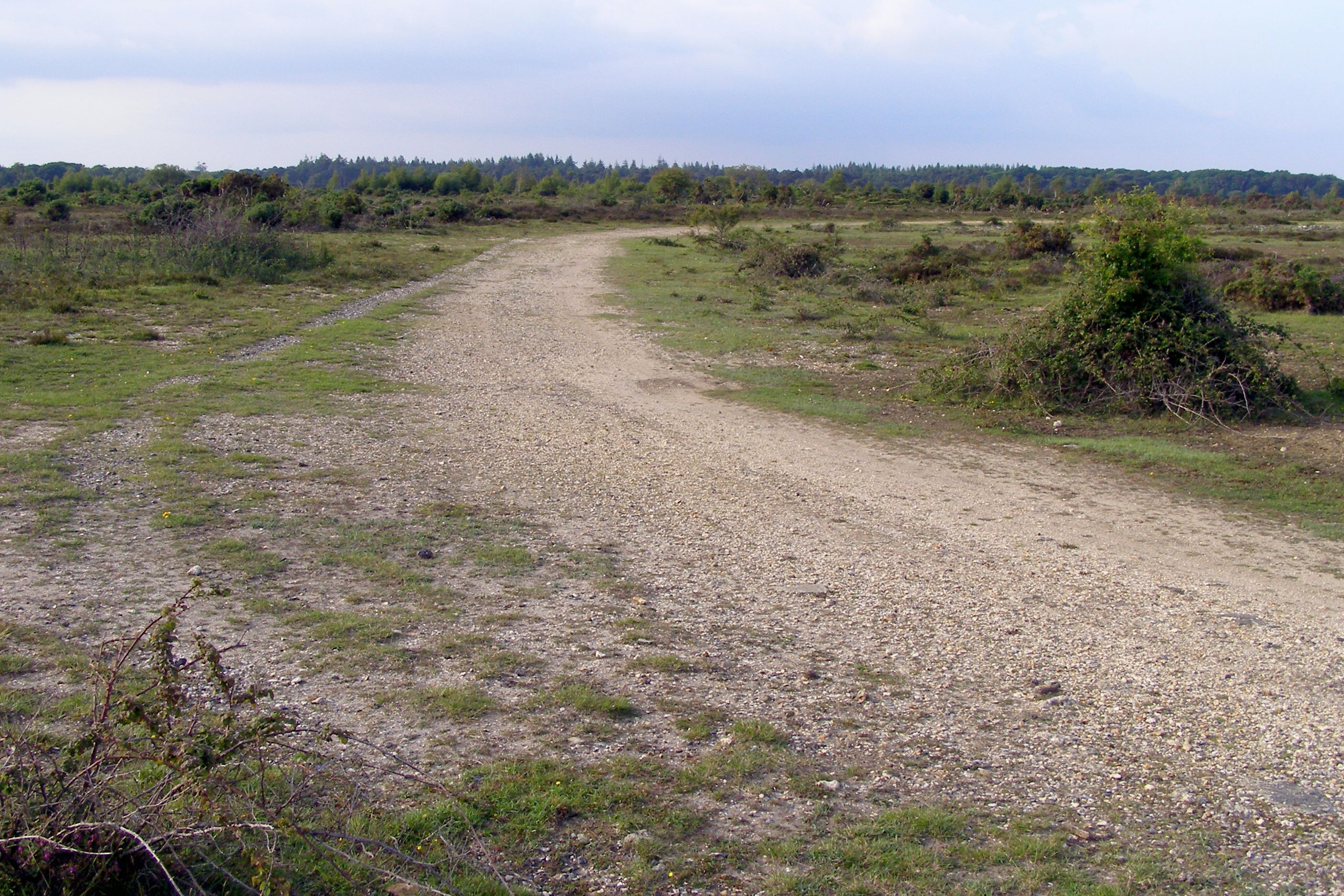
Perimeter track at the west end of the 010 runway in 2007.

With the facility released from military control, it once again became part of the New Forest Crown lands managed by the Forestry Commission. Half a century on from its use as a military airfield, the vast majority of the concreted areas of the airfield have been removed and returned to heathland, although the former locations of the runways along with the perimeter track are all clearly identifiable in aerial photography.

The RAF Base Identification Code, Pundit Code letters BL can still be seen at this location 50°48'31.2"N 1°30'28.4"W.

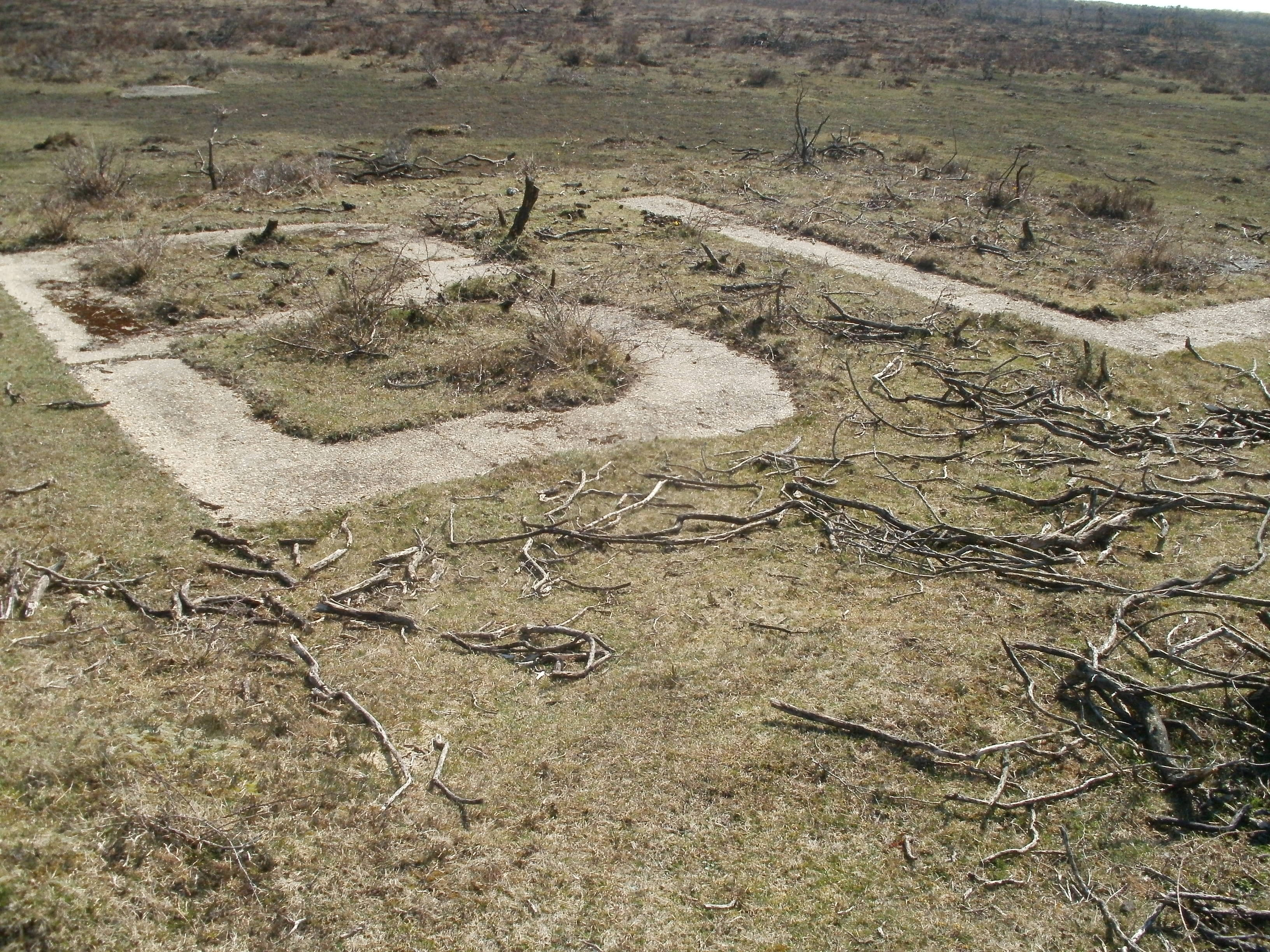
RAF Beaulieu Pundit Code

The connecting length of the eastern perimeter road is used as a cycle track. No buildings around the airfield area exist, although the old water tower still stands to the north west of the airfield on Roundhill campsite, a Forestry Commission site which uses part of the old access roads of the airfield. The tank on the top of the water tower is not the original WW2 one, but a replacement placed in July 2014 for the Bournemouth Water Company. Small parts of the former airfield are now covered with conifers. The only surviving buildings from the airfield that remain today are several handcraft huts and small ablutions buildings to the west of the airfield on private farmland. These huts were once accommodation for the airfield.

=== Model flying ===
A small section of the eastern end of the 27/09 main runway near the Lymington road is still concreted and used regularly as a runway, pit and pilot control area for model aircraft. There are separate flying areas set aside for radio-controlled flight and free flight. The flying club pays fees to the Forestry Commission each year for the use of its land.

== See also ==
- List of former Royal Air Force stations
