= SS Thistlegorm =

British armed merchantman sunk in the Red Sea at Ras Muhammad

Coordinates: 27°48′51″N 33°55′12″E

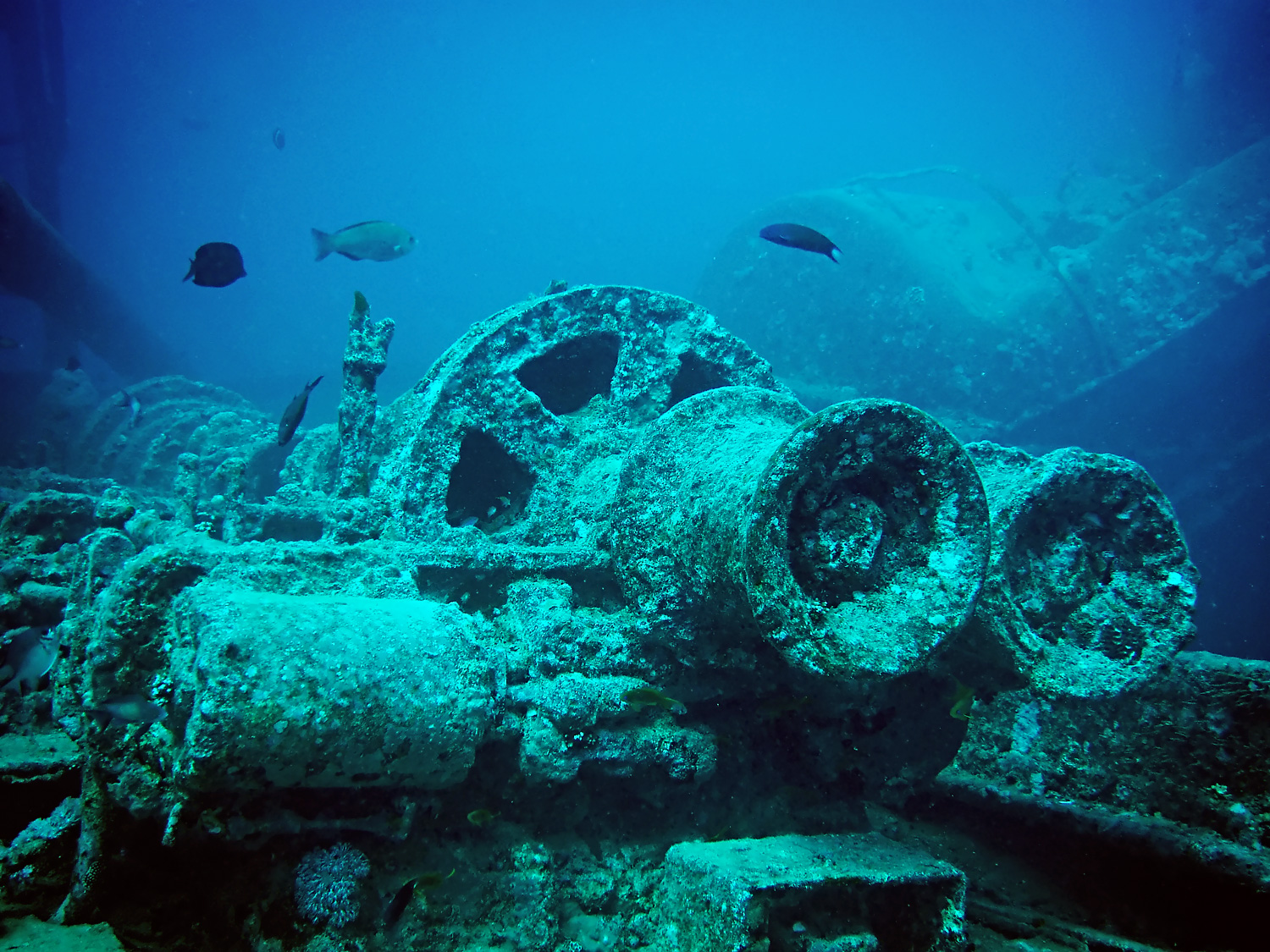
- Steam windlass and mooring winches aboard Thistlegorm

History

United Kingdom
- Owner: Albyn Line
- Operator: Albyn, Black & Co
- Port of registry: Sunderland
- Builder: J.L. Thompson and Sons, Sunderland
- Yard number: 599
- Launched: 9 April 1940
- Sponsored by: Mrs KW Black
- Completed: 24 June 1940
- Identification: UK official number 163052; call sign GLWQ
- Fate: Sunk by German aircraft 6 October 1941

General characteristics
- Type: Cargo ship
- Tonnage: 4,898 GRT, 2,750 NRT
- Displacement: c.13,000 tons fully loaded
- Length: 415.1 ft (126.5 m)
- Beam: 58.2 ft (17.7 m)
- Draught: 26 ft (7.9 m)
- Depth: 24.8 ft (7.6 m)
- Decks: 1
- Installed power: 365 NHP, 1,850 IHP
- Propulsion: 1 × triple-expansion engine; 1 × screw
- Crew: 41
- Sensors & processing systems: wireless direction finding; echo sounding device
- Armament: 1 × 4 in (100 mm) low angle gun; 1 × 3 in (76 mm) anti-aircraft gun

SS Thistlegorm was a British cargo steamship that was built in Sunderland, North East England in 1940 and sunk by German bomber aircraft in the Red Sea in 1941. Her wreck near the Ras Muhammad National Park is now a well-known diving site.

== Building ==
J.L. Thompson and Sons built Thistlegorm in Sunderland, County Durham, as yard number 599. She was launched on 9 April 1940 and completed on 24 June. Her registered length was 415.1 ft (126.5 m), her beam was 58.2 ft (17.7 m) and her depth was 24.8 ft (7.6 m). Her tonnages were 4,898 GRT and 2,750 NRT. The North Eastern Marine Engineering built her engine, which was a three-cylinder triple-expansion engine rated at 365 NHP or 1,850 IHP.

Thistlegorm was built for Albyn Line, who registered her at Sunderland. Her UK official number was 163052 and her wireless telegraphy call sign was GLWQ.

The Ministry of War Transport partly funded Thistlegorm. She was a defensively equipped merchant ship (DEMS) with a 4.7 in (120 mm) mounted on her stern and a heavy-calibre machine gun for anti-aircraft cover.

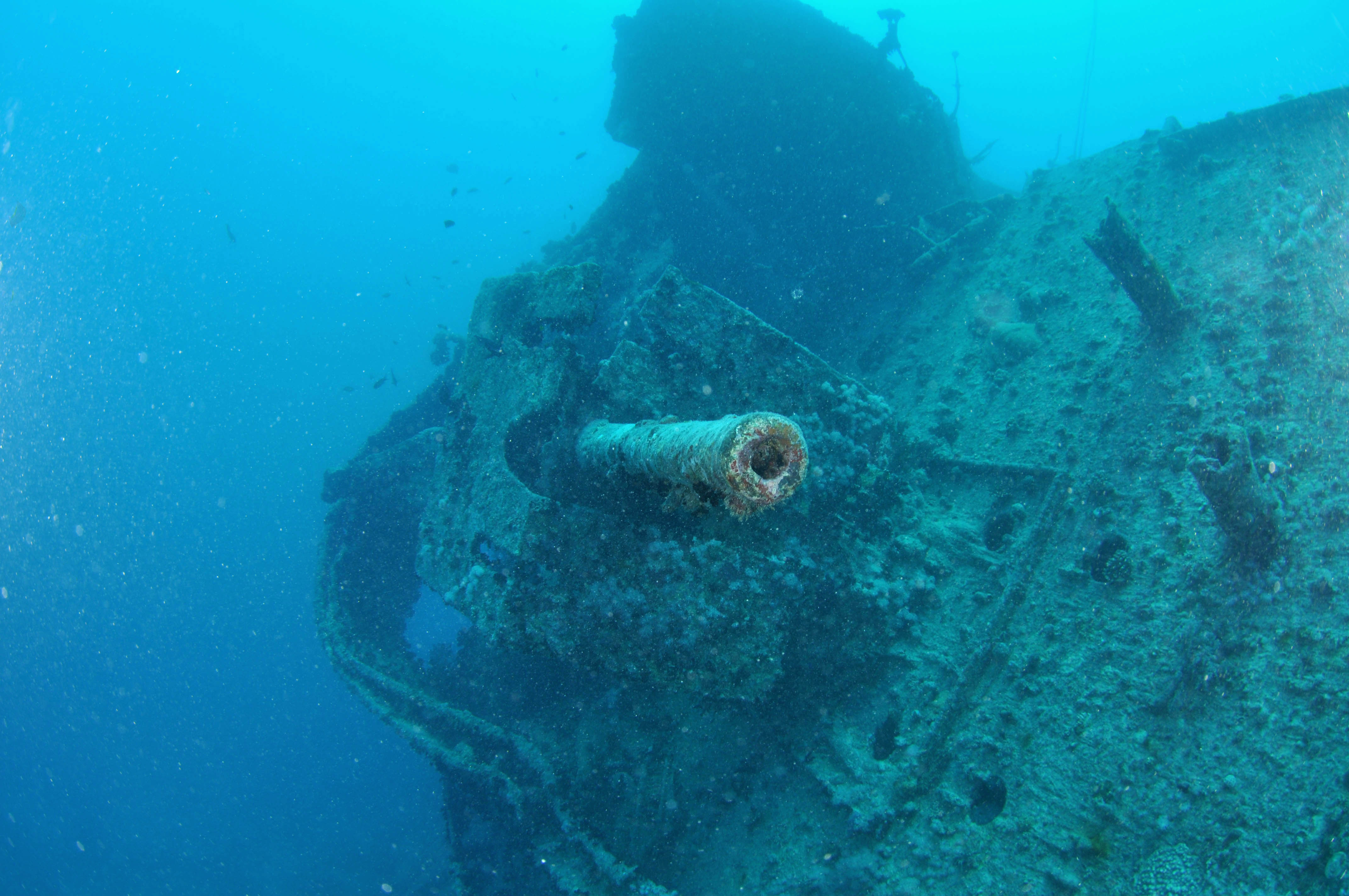
Main gun on the stern of Thistlegorm

The ship completed three successful voyages in her career. The first was to the US to collect steel rails and aircraft parts, the second to Argentina for grain, and the third to the West Indies for rum. Prior to her fourth and final voyage, she had undergone repairs in Glasgow.

== Final voyage ==
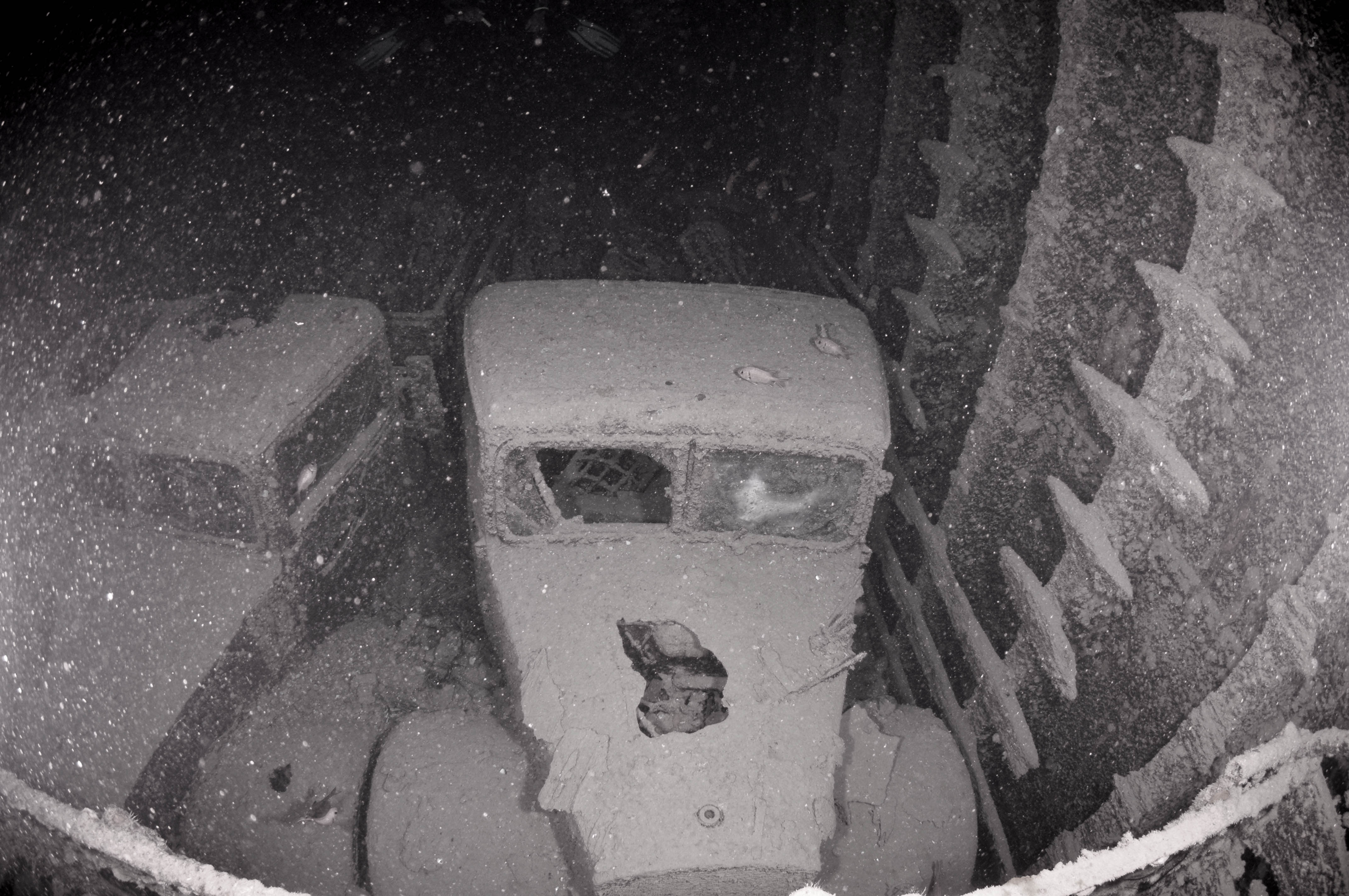
Trucks, part of the cargo of Thistlegorm

She left Glasgow on her final voyage on 2 June 1941, destined for Alexandria, Egypt. The ship's cargo included: Bedford trucks, Universal Carrier armoured vehicles, Norton 16H and BSA motorcycles, Bren guns, cases of ammunition, and 0.303 rifles as well as radio equipment, Wellington boots, aircraft parts, railway wagons and two LMS Stanier Class 8F steam locomotives.

These steam locomotives and their associated coal and water tenders were carried as deck cargo intended for Egyptian National Railways. The rest of the cargo was for the Allied forces in Egypt. At the time Thistlegorm sailed from Glasgow in June, this was the Western Desert Force, which in September 1941 became part of the newly formed Eighth Army. The crew of the ship, under Captain William Ellis, were supplemented by nine naval personnel to man the machine gun and the anti-aircraft gun.

Due to German and Italian naval and air force activity in the Mediterranean, Thistlegorm sailed as part of a convoy via Cape Town, South Africa, where she bunkered, before heading north up the East coast of Africa and into the Red Sea. On leaving Cape Town, the light cruiser HMS Carlisle joined the convoy. Due to a collision in the Suez Canal, the convoy could not transit through the canal to reach the port of Alexandria and instead moored at Safe Anchorage F, in September 1941 where she remained at anchor until her sinking on 6 October 1941. HMS Carlisle moored in the same anchorage.

There was a large build-up of Allied troops in Egypt during September 1941 and German intelligence (Abwehr) suspected that there was a troop carrier in the area bringing in additional troops. Two Heinkel He 111 aircraft of II. Group, Kampfgeschwader 26, Luftwaffe, were dispatched from Crete to find and destroy the troop carrier. This search failed but one of the bombers discovered the ships moored in Safe Anchorage F. Targeting the largest ship, they dropped two 2.5 tonne high explosive bombs on Thistlegorm, both of which struck hold 4 near the stern of the ship at 0130 on 6 October. The bomb and the explosion of some of the ammunition stored in hold 4 led to the sinking of Thistlegorm with the loss of four sailors and five DEMS gunners. The survivors were picked up by HMS Carlisle.

Captain Ellis was awarded the OBE for his actions following the explosion and a crewman, Angus McLeay, was awarded the George Medal and the Lloyd's War Medal for Bravery at Sea for saving another crew member. Most of the cargo remained within the ship, the major exception being the steam locomotives from the deck cargo which were blown off to either side of the wreck.

== Discovery by Cousteau ==
In the early 1950s, Jacques Cousteau discovered her by using information from local fishermen. He raised several items from the wreck, including a motorcycle, the captain's safe, and the ship's bell. The February 1956 edition of National Geographic clearly shows the ship's bell in place and Cousteau's divers in the ship's lantern room. Cousteau documented diving on the wreck in part of his book The Living Sea.

== Rediscovery and recreational dive site ==
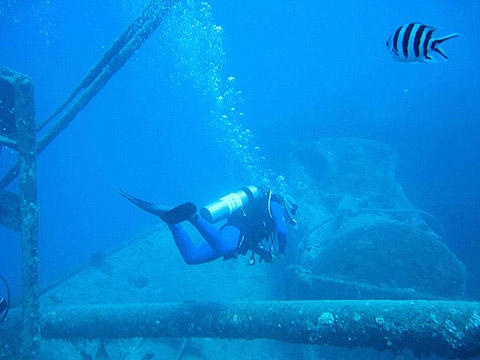
Diving on Thistlegorm

Following Cousteau's visit, the site was forgotten about except by local fishermen. In the early 1990s, Sharm el-Sheikh began to develop as a diving resort. Recreational diving on Thistlegorm restarted following the visit of the dive boat Poolster, using information from another Israeli fishing boat captain.

The massive explosion that sank her had blown much of her midships superstructure away and makes the wreck very accessible to divers. The depth of around 30 m (100 feet) at its deepest is ideal for diving without the need for specialist equipment and training.

The wreck attracts many divers for the amount of the cargo that can be seen and explored. Boots and motorcycles are visible in Hold No. 1. Trucks, motorcycles, Wellington boots, rifles, Westland Lysander wings, about twenty Bristol Mercury radial engine exhaust rings and a handful of cylinders and Bristol Blenheim bomber tailplanes are visible in Hold No. 2. Universal Carrier armoured vehicles, RAF trolley accumulators, and two Pundit Lights can also be found. Off to the port side of the wreck level with the blast area can be found one of the steam locomotives which had been stored as deck cargo and the other locomotive is off the starboard side level with Hold No. 2.

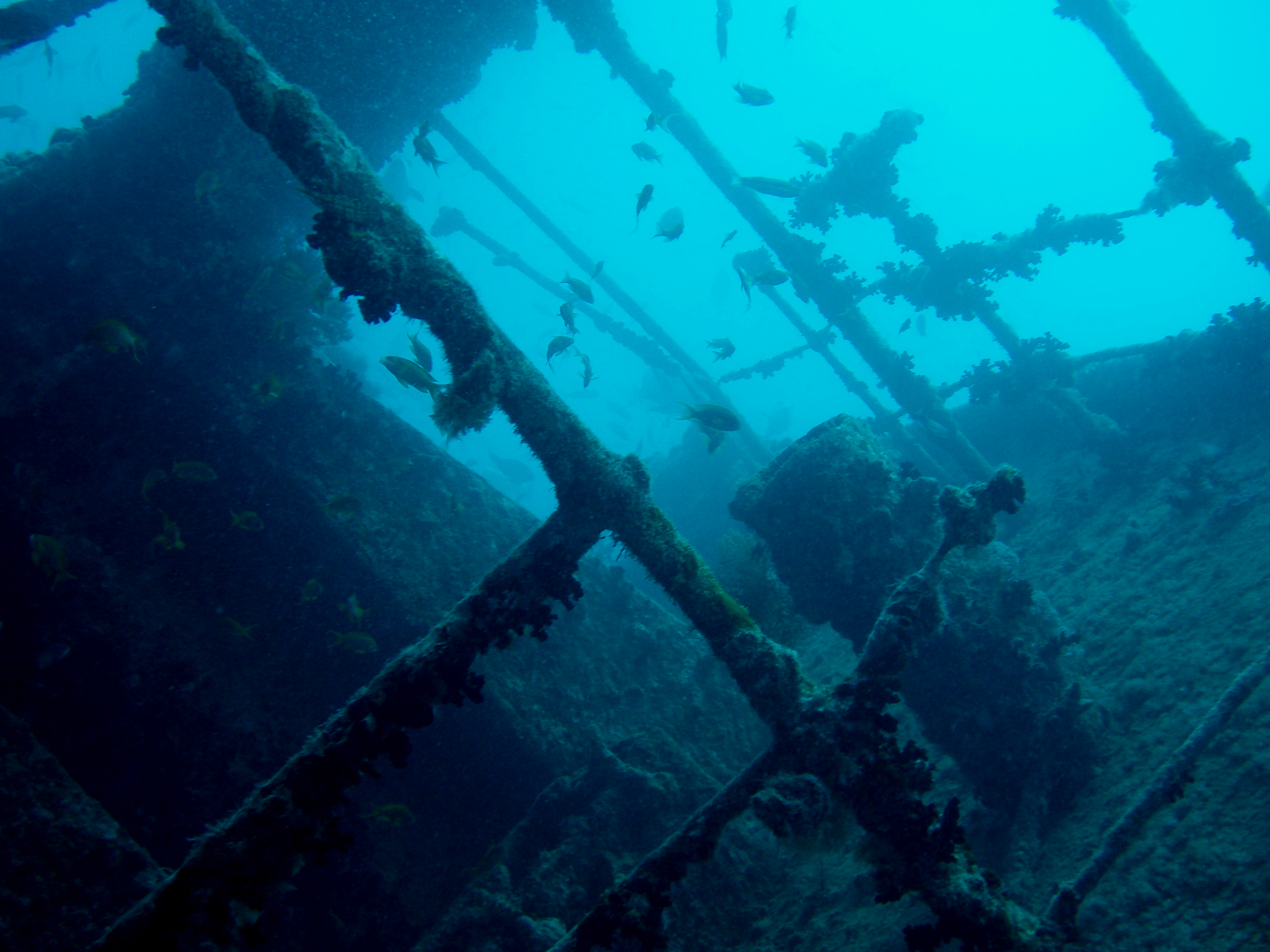
Aft view of the walkway leading to the bridge of Thistlegorm

In 2007 The Times named Thistlegorm as one of the top ten wreck diving sites in the world. The wreck is rapidly disintegrating due to natural rusting. The dive boats that rely on the wreck for their livelihood are also tearing the wreck apart by mooring the boats to weak parts of the wreck, leading to the collapse of parts of the wreck. For this reason, in December 2007 the non-governmental Hurghada Environmental Protection and Conservation Association (HEPCA) installed 32 mooring buoys around the wreck and drilled holes in the hull to allow trapped air to escape.

During this work, the ship was closed off to recreational diving. However, by 2009 none of these moorings remained as the blocks themselves were too light. Moored ships dragged them and the lines connecting the moorings to the wreck were too long (meaning with the strong currents in the area, people would find it impossible to transfer from the mooring to the actual wreck). All boats now moor directly to the wreck again.

Common interesting animals around the wreck are tuna, barracuda, batfish, moray eel, lionfish, stonefish, crocodilefish, scorpionfish, and sea turtle.

In February 2021 it was announced that Simon Brown was the winner of the General Science category of the Royal Photographic Society's Science Photographer of the Year for his orthophoto (aerial photograph adjusted to have uniform scale) of the submerged wreck of Thistlegorm, made from 15,005 merged frames.
