= RAF Andover =

Former Royal Air Force flying base in Hampshire, England

RAF Andover
- Near Andover, Hampshire in England
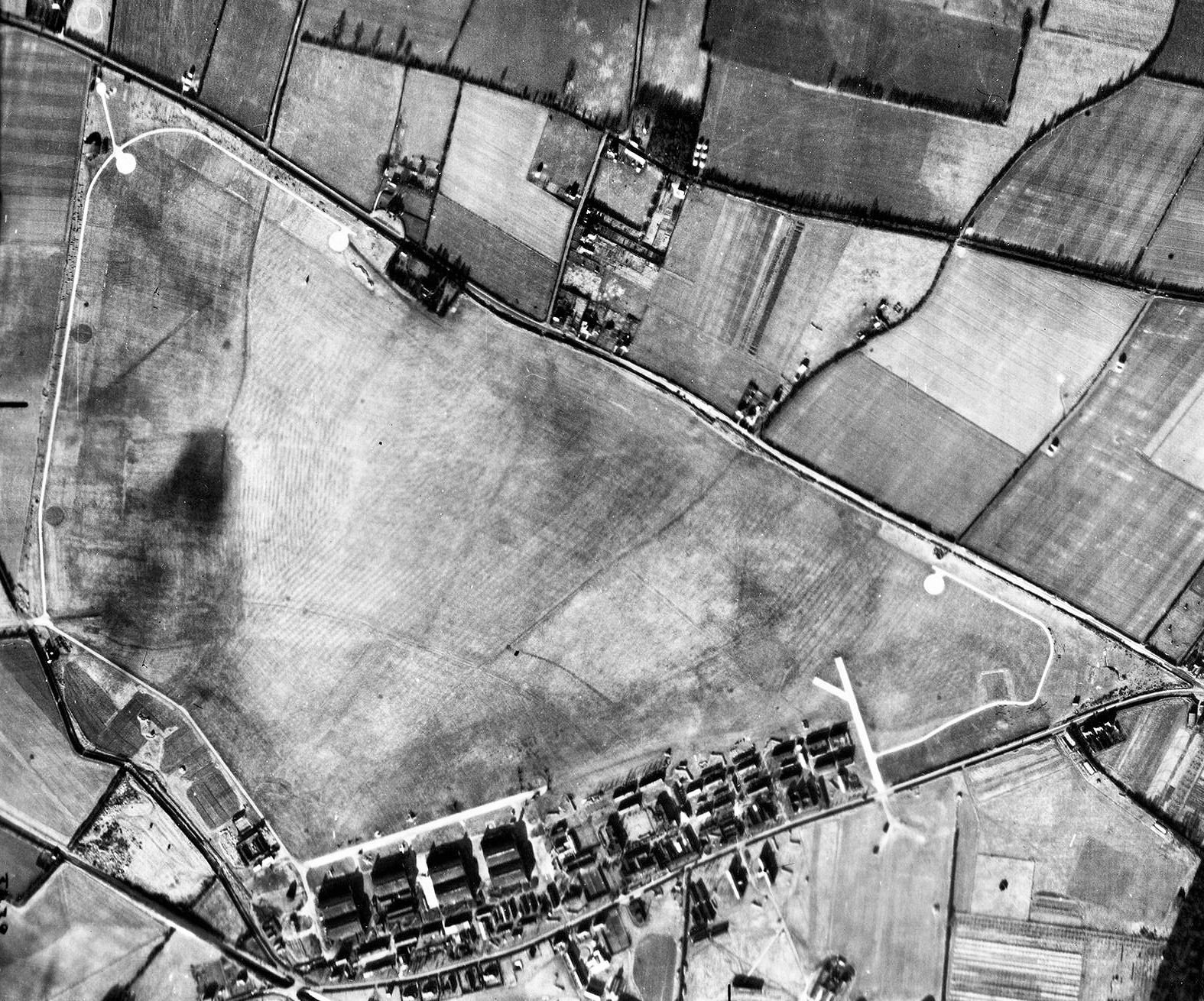
- Aerial photograph of RAF Andover oriented north, 16 January 1947

Site information
- Type: Royal Air Force station
- Owner: Ministry of Defence
- Operator: Royal Flying Corps; Aviation Section, U.S. Signal Corps; Royal Air Force; Air Transport Auxiliary; United States Army Air Forces; Army Air Corps; Royal Canadian Air Force
- Controlled by: Air Defence of Great Britain; RAF Fighter Command * No. 22 (AC) Group RAF; RAF Maintenance Command; RAF Army Cooperation Command; RAF Support Command

Location
- Shown within Hampshire RAF Andover (the United Kingdom)
- Coordinates: 51°12′31″N 001°31′31″W

Site history
- Built: 1917
- In use: August 1917-1977
- Battles/wars: First World War; European theatre of World War II; Cold War

Airfield information
- Identifiers: IATA: ADV, ICAO: EGWA
- Elevation: 260 feet (79 m) AMSL
Runways
Direction	Length and surface
~~01/30~~	Asphalt

RAF Andover (IATA: ADV, ICAO: EGWA) is a former Royal Flying Corps and Royal Air Force station in England, 2 miles (3.2 km) west of Andover, Hampshire. As well as RFC and RAF units, units of the Aviation Section, U.S. Signal Corps, Royal Canadian Air Force, United States Army Air Forces, and the Air Transport Auxiliary were also stationed at the airfield.

The airfield has a notable place in history as the site of the first attempt to develop a viable long-range electronic navigation system, during the First World War, and also of the first British military helicopter unit and first European helicopter flying training school, during the Second World War.

RAF Andover was also used before and after the Second World War for a variety of other aeronautical research and flight testing. The RAF Staff College, Andover was founded here in 1922, the first college to train officers in the administrative, staff and policy aspects of running an air force.

RAF Andover saw action during the Second World War. Corporal Josephine Robins, one of only six members of the WAAF to win the Military Medal during the War, won her award for courage while rescuing people during an air-raid on the airfield in the Battle of Britain. Three squadrons of the Royal Canadian Air Force were formed at RAF Andover. Before and during the Battle of Normandy, it was used by the United States Army Air Forces Ninth Air Force as an operational tactical fighter airfield.

The RAF station closed in 1977 and the site was later redeveloped. In 2009 part of it became Marlborough Lines, home to the Headquarters of the British Army.

== Airfield history ==
=== Before 1912 ===
The earliest known human activity on the site of Andover Airfield took place in the Bronze Age, according to archaeological evidence, which has uncovered significant Iron Age and later activity, including Anglo-Saxon and medieval cemeteries. Military activity began with the construction during or shortly after 43 AD of the Portway (called here Monxton Road), a Roman road from Silchester (Calleva Atrebatum) to Old Sarum (Sorbiodunum), which just north of the airfield meets at East Anton crossroads the Icknield Way, the Roman road from Winchester (Venta Belgarum) to Mildenhall (Cunetio). The Andover sections of these roads were constructed by the Legio II Augusta.

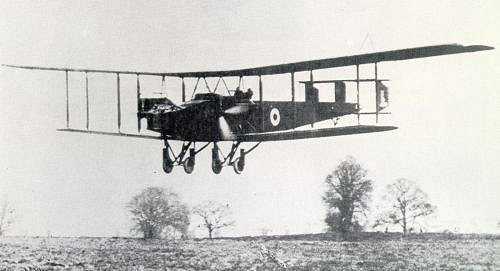
A Handley Page O/400 lands at RAF Andover, 1918

Very close to the site which became the airfield, in 1910 the British Army airship Beta made a forced landing at Little Park in Anna Valley.

=== 1912 to 1918 ===
The Royal Flying Corps (RFC) opened a station near Andover in August 1917 during the First World War. The station was mainly built by German prisoners of war, some of whom left their signatures in roof spaces of buildings on the station.

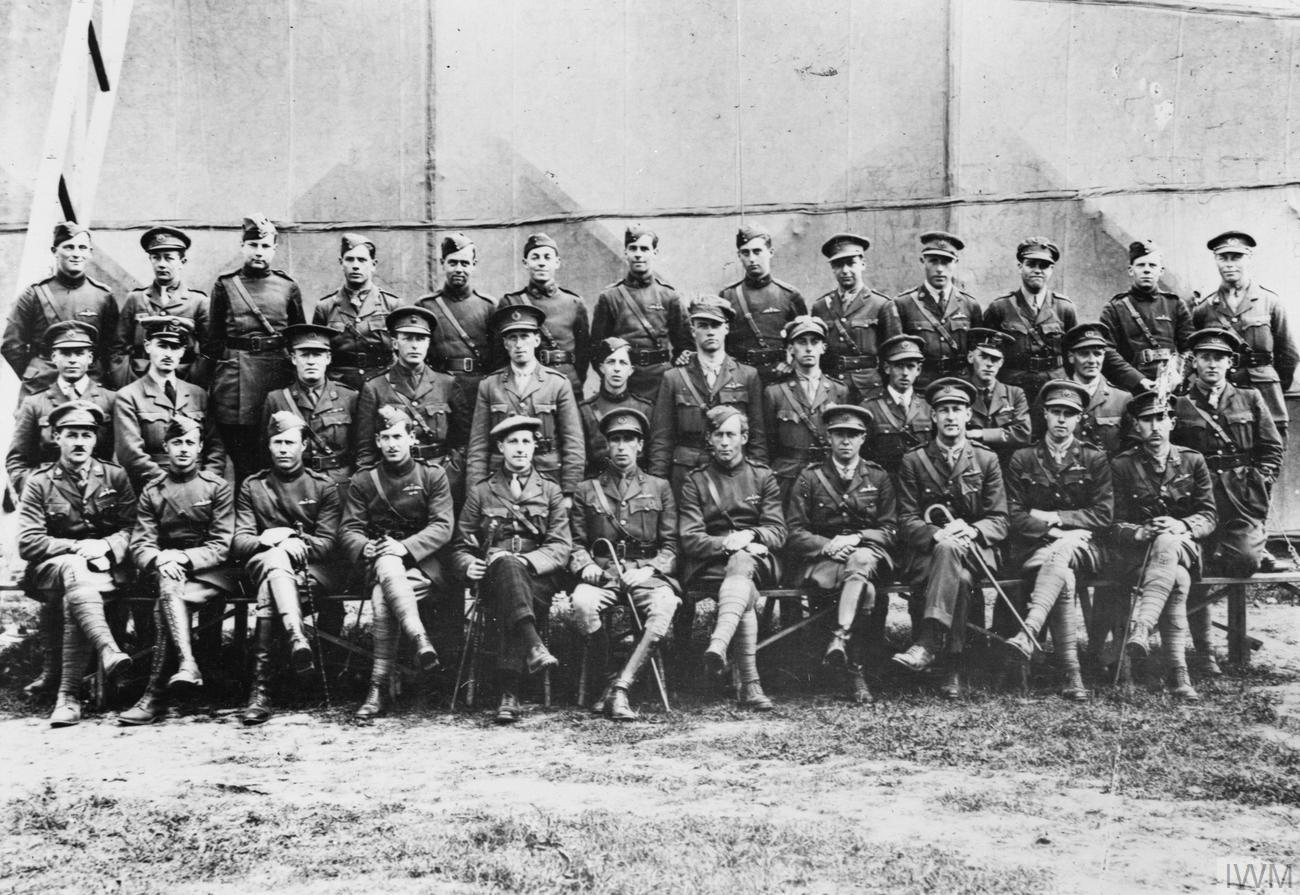
Officers of 104 Squadron RFC at Andover before the squadron left for France in early 1918

Plans for an RFC "Training Depot Station" on the site had first been made in 1912. The station motto was Vis et armis consilioque orta (Latin: With determination and equipment, I take counsel to rise up), reflecting the station's role in training aircrews, who had completed basic flying training, to learn to fly the Handley Page Type O and Airco DH.9 bombers. The first unit to occupy the station was No. 2 School of Navigation and Bomb Dropping, which took up residence while the station was still under construction.

Amongst squadrons formed at Andover was 106 Squadron, on 30 September 1917, who were equipped with Royal Aircraft Factory R.E.8 reconnaissance aircraft for army co-operation duties, being posted to Ireland in May 1918.

American squadrons were also based at the airfield, as from 24 December 1917 to 6 June 1918 Andover was host to a detachments of the 13th Aero Squadron and 104th Aero Squadron of the Aviation Section, U.S. Signal Corps.

In early 1918, experiments were conducted with Handley Page Type O bombers, based at Andover and Cranwell, fitted with Radio Direction-Finding (RDF as it was called) equipment for night flying. The intention was to guide British bombers to and from Berlin, and early results led to 550 sets of RDF equipment being ordered by the United States Army Air Service, but the war ended before any operational use was made of the system. This was the first attempt to develop a long-range electronic navigation system, of a kind that is today used routinely worldwide.

When the RAF Station closed in 1977 a number of artefacts from the airfield's early history and later were donated to 1213 (Andover) Squadron Air Training Corps. These included a large carved wooden copy of the RFC cap badge which was later donated to the Army Flying Museum and is now on display in its café.

=== 1918 to 1939 ===
Between the wars, the airfield housed a number of RAF units, including from 1919 the RAF School of Navigation, as No. 2 School of Navigation and Bomb Dropping was retitled. The RAF Staff College was founded here on 1 April 1922, to provide staff training to selected officers, and eventually moved to Bracknell in 1970.

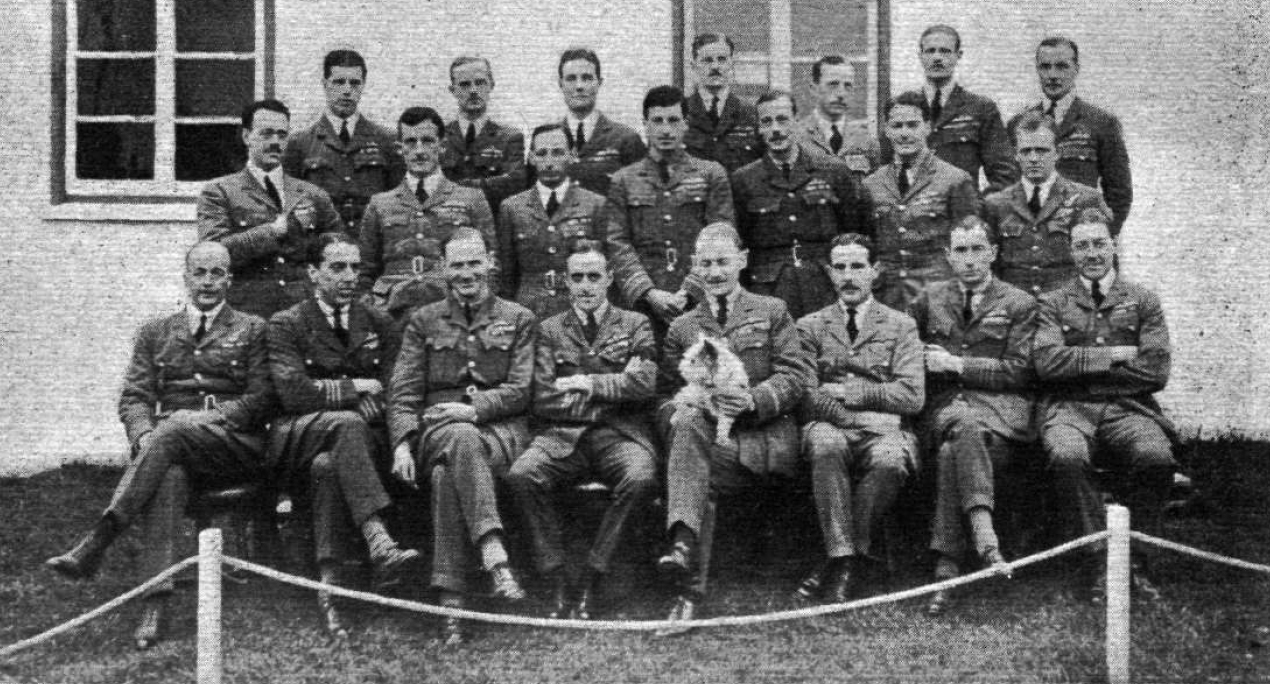
The first RAF Staff College course at Andover in 1922 with Jane the dog

A still preserved reminder of the RAF Staff College on the former airfield is a headstone from 1926 on the North Site marking the grave of Jane. She was a dog belonging to the first Commandant Robert Brooke-Popham.

The formation of the Royal Air Forces Association followed a conversation in 1929 in the Sergeants' Mess of RAF Andover.

RAF Andover continued to be used for a variety of aeronautical research and flight testing. As part of this, several experimental military aircraft made their first flights from the airfield. Amongst them were the Westland Yeovil; the Westland Witch; the Westland F.7/30; and all of the Westland-Hill Pterodactyl series of experimental flying wing aircraft.

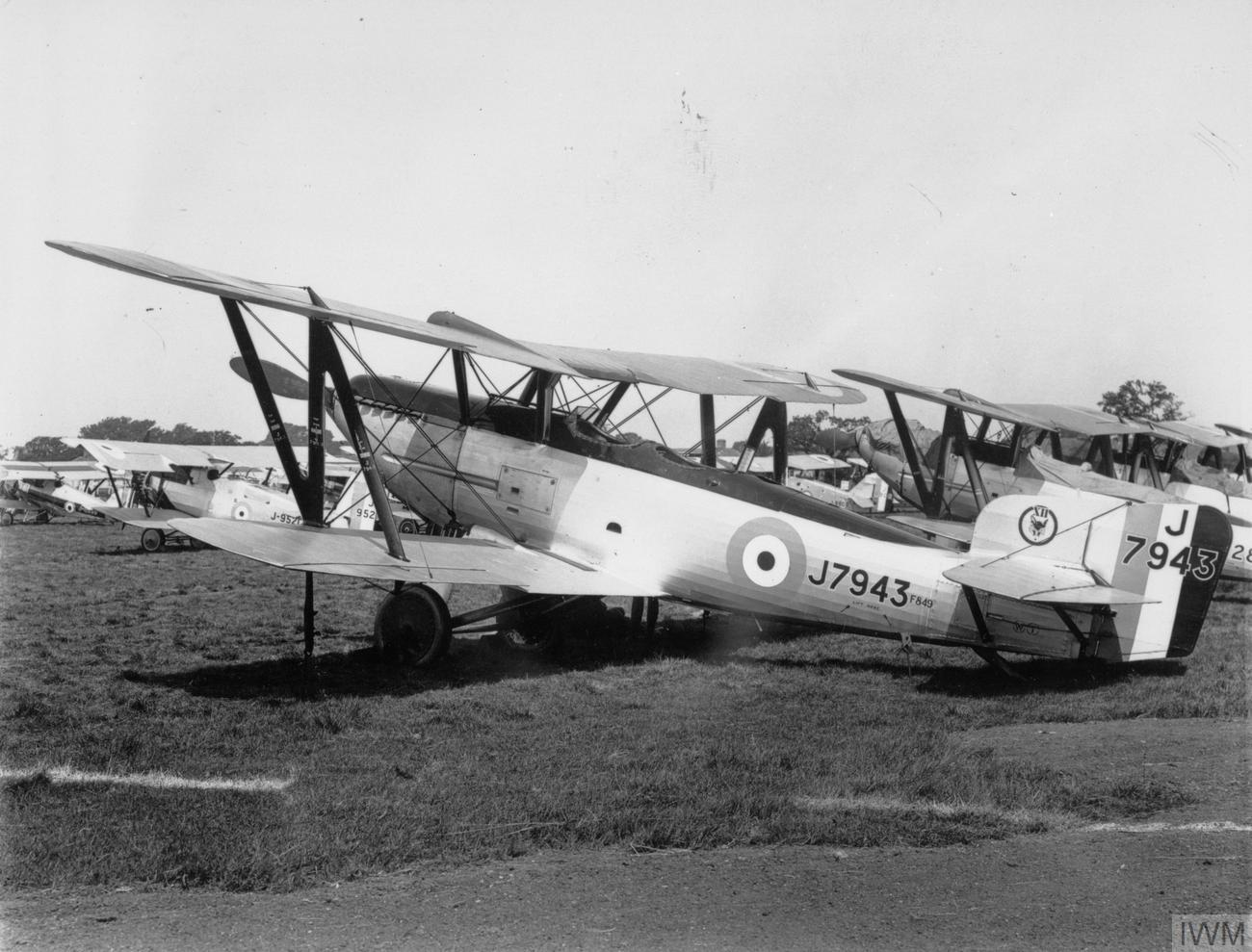
Fairey Foxes of 12 Squadron

Two experimental bomber squadrons were based at RAF Andover in the late 1920s and early 1930s, No. 12 Squadron RAF and No. 101 Squadron RAF. No. 13 Squadron was also based here for five years between 1924 and 1929, operating Armstrong Whitworth Atlas aircraft.

No. 12 squadron operated Fairey Fawn light bombers from March 1924, and later the Fairey Fox bomber, which was significantly faster than its contemporaries. To this day, 12 Squadron's unit motto 'Leads the Field' and crest commemorates their time at RAF Andover by depicting the head of a fox. The Fairey Fox was the first all-metal aircraft in operational service, and 12 Squadron was the only squadron to operate it. The aircraft was a private venture by Fairey, which had been demonstrated to the Squadron secretly during an 'At Home' at RAF Andover in 1925, when the Fox appeared in Royal Air Force markings and 12 Squadron colours. During the Air Defence of Great Britain exercise in 1928, the Squadron was tasked with the simulated bombing of London. To commemorate 12 Squadron's success in the exercise, the Commander in Chief of the Royal Air Force chose a fox's face as the Squadron emblem.

A typical annual training programme for 12 Squadron consisted of individual training in the autumn, working up to Squadron training in the summer consisting of bombing, formation flying, navigation exercises and gunnery. Experimental trials carried out included some limited night flying and the introduction into service and testing of parachutes for aircrew. This involved a number of practice jumps being performed by observers, who would climb out of the aircraft onto a small ladder and await a signal from the pilot as the aircraft flew over the airfield at 2000 ft. 12 Squadron was also tasked with further trials work, experimenting with oxygen systems, high altitude photography, and low temperature trials work, particularly in respect to lubricants. In addition, cloud flying in formation and pattern bombing techniques were tested.

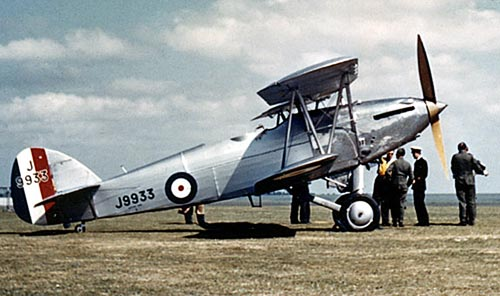
Hawker Hart

The Foxes were replaced in January 1931 with the Hawker Hart, after which much work was put into formation flying in cloud, instrument flying, pattern bombing and aircraft icing trials. The purpose of these trials was to enable Royal Air Force aircraft to bomb an enemy ship successfully, regardless of weather. To this end, 12 Squadron dropped several practice bombs on an obsolete battleship, HMS Centurion, which was a radio-controlled target off the south coast. On 6 July 1935, King George V performed the first Royal Review of the Royal Air Force, in which 12(B) Squadron led the Light Bomber Wing flypast at RAF Mildenhall. Andover was considered as one of the locations for the Royal Review before Mildenhall was chosen.

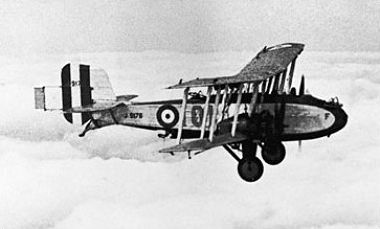
A Boulton-Paul Sidestrand of No. 101 Squadron RAF

Several home-based squadrons, including 12 Squadron, were re-deployed in October 1935 to the Middle East and Aden in preparation for action being taken by the League of Nations against Italy for invading Abyssinia. 12 Squadron returned to Andover in August 1936, and on its return took delivery of the Hawker Hind. In 1936, 12 Squadron, with 44 and 142 Squadrons also stationed at Andover, played host to a visit by Generalfeldmarschall Werner von Blomberg when he was the German Minister of War. It was also around this time that the majority of B Flight were taken to form the nucleus of the newly formed No. 63 Squadron. In February 1938, the Squadron was re-equipped with Fairey Battles, the squadron leaving RAF Andover in May 1939.

In October 1929 No. 101 Squadron, the second experimental bomber squadron, was also posted to RAF Andover, to enable its Boulton-Paul Sidestrand bombers to work alongside 12 Squadron with its Fairey Fox light bombers. The high performance of the Sidestrand impressed crowds at the Hendon Air Pageants, where it flew mock combat aerobatics with the fighters of the day. 101 Squadron Sidestrands won a number of bombing and reconnaissance competitions and carried out trial anti-shipping strikes against Royal Navy battleships. In December 1934 the squadron left Andover.

=== 1939 to 1945 ===
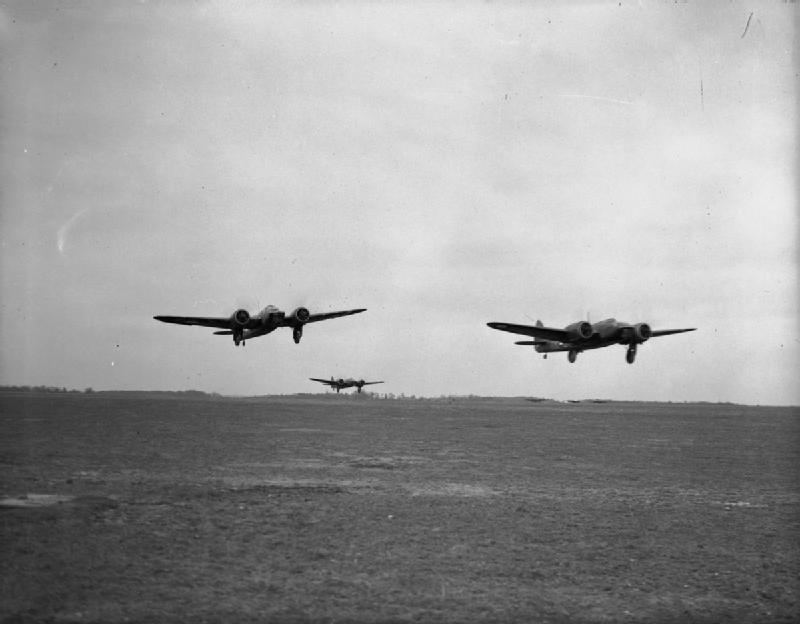
Bristol Blenheims of 59 Squadron taking off from Poix-de-Picardie after leaving RAF Andover in 1939

At the start of the Second World War, RAF Andover was home to 59 Squadron flying Bristol Blenheim bombers, and to the headquarters of RAF Maintenance Command.

59 Squadron deployed from Andover in October 1939 to Poix-de-Picardie in France, returning to Andover in May 1940 after the Battle of France ended in defeat. French Air Force aircraft and crews going into exile to continue fighting were on arrival initially directed to Andover.

Andover was later also used by several operational flying training units and as an operational fighter station by the United States Army Air Forces (USAAF).

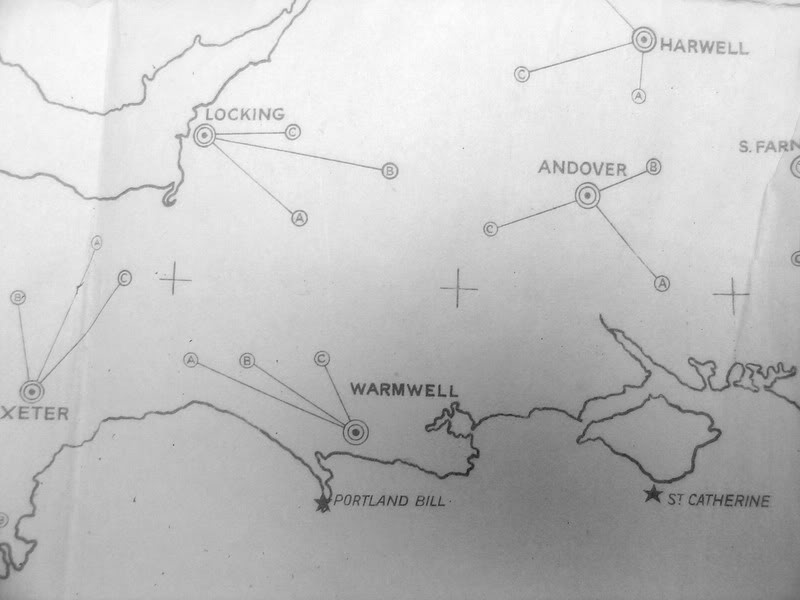
Map of airfields including Andover, showing associated Pundit Light positions

From 1937, Andover was given the Pundit Code AV. The code AV was broadcast in morse code by a mobile red light beacon at night, during the latter part of the Second World War. The code was also painted on the airfield hangar nearest to the control tower, and remained visible until the hangars were demolished in 2001.

While Andover was an operational USAAF station, it was designated Station 406.

The Air Transport Auxiliary's (ATA) Central Ferry Control was also based at RAF Andover. A civilian organisation that – unusually for the time – had female pilots, the ATA ferried new, repaired and damaged military aircraft between factories, assembly plants, transatlantic delivery points, Maintenance Units, scrapyards, and active service squadrons and airfields. Central Ferry Control allocated the required flights to all ATA Ferry Pools.

RAF Andover was one of four airfields in Hampshire to be given a decoy site in 1940, to deceive enemy aircraft into attacking a spurious target. Andover had two decoy sites, the first being at Hurstbourne Tarrant, a type 'Q' decoy site (Q70b) with fake aircraft and buildings in use from 1940 to October 1944. From September 1940, fake machine gun posts were added there. Andover's second decoy site, Q70a in use from July 1940 to July 1941, was at Thruxton but its exact location is unknown.

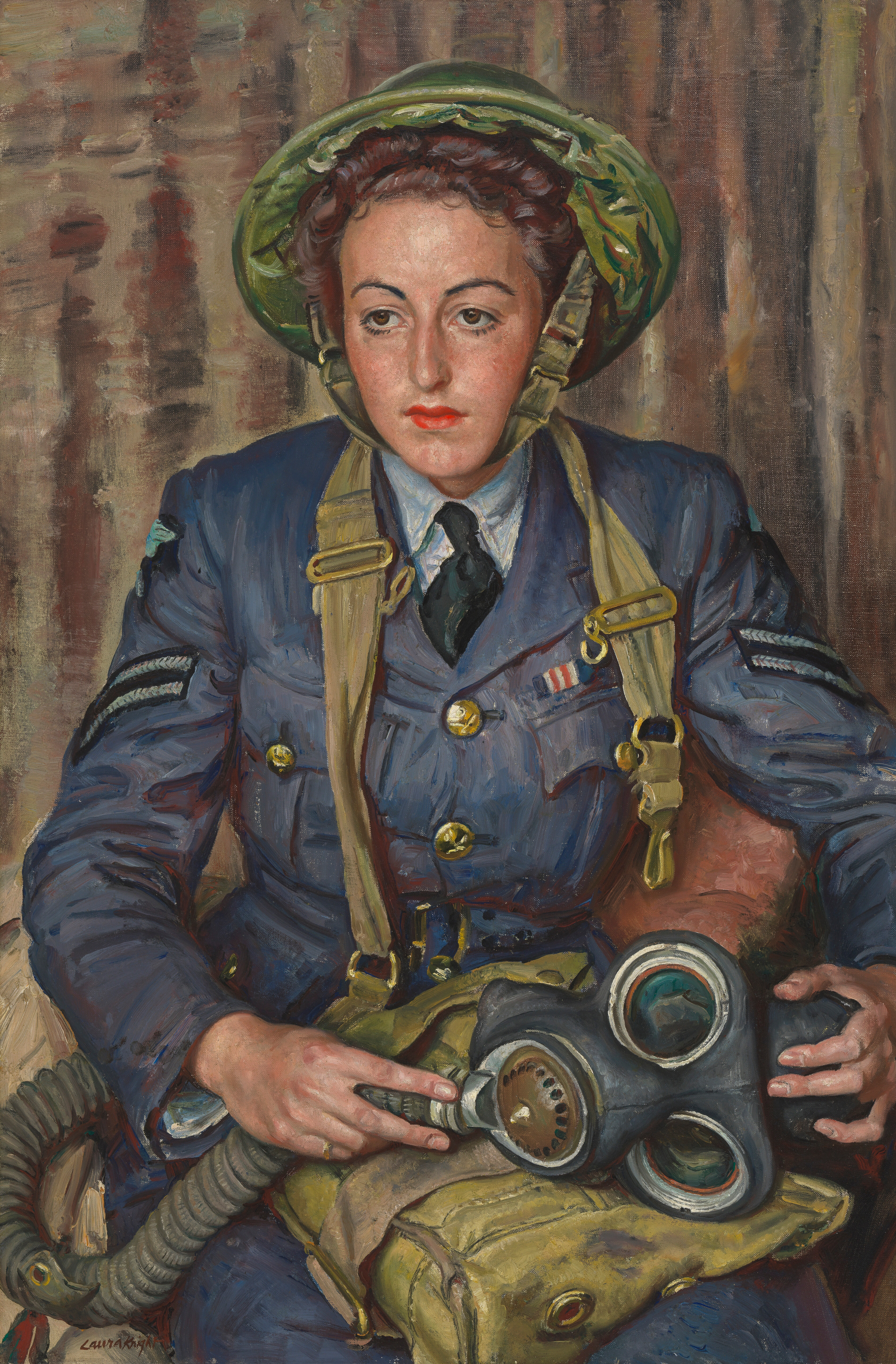
Corporal Josephine Robins, MM, WAAF, painted in 1941 by Laura Knight

RAF Andover was attacked twice by the Luftwaffe during the Battle of Britain. At 1700 hours on 13 August 1940, approximately 12 high explosive bombs were dropped by Junkers Ju 88s of III Staffel, Lehrgeschwader 1, of Luftflotte 3, from Châteaudun in France. The Station Headquarters and officer's quarters were extensively damaged. One aircraft on the station was also damaged. Casualties were two killed including Squadron Leader Louis de Lorme Leder who is buried in Holy Trinity Church, Penton Mewsey.

The following day, 14 August 1940, Andover was attacked again, about 15 high explosive bombs being dropped which destroyed a transmitting set in the centre of a group of radio masts. Casualties were two killed: Aircraftsman 1st Class Alfred Warner Clarke who is buried in Andover Cemetery; and civilian radio operator Herbert Gill Read

Corporal Josephine Robins, a Women's Auxiliary Air Force (WAAF) telephone operator at RAF Andover was awarded the Military Medal for her courage during these raids. The citation for the award, printed in The London Gazette of 20 December 1940, stated that: "Corporal Robins was in a dug-out which received a direct hit during an intense enemy bombing raid. A number of men were killed and two seriously injured. Though dust and fumes filled the shelter, Corporal Robins immediately went to the assistance of the wounded and rendered first aid. While they were being removed from the demolished dug-out, she fetched a stretcher and stayed with the wounded until they were evacuated. She displayed courage and coolness of a very high order in a position of extreme danger". Corporal Robins' Military Medal was one of only six such awards of this medal made to members of the WAAF in the entire Second World War.

It was thought at the time that these air raids were attempts to attack the important 11 Group Fighter Command Sector Station nearby at RAF Middle Wallop, but German records make it clear that RAF Andover was the intended target, as the Luftwaffe thought wrongly that it was an operational bomber station. In 1941 RAF Andover was attacked twice, causing heavy damage to one hangar, which had to be demolished.

In June 1941, No. 2 School of Army Co-operation at Andover was re-designated as No. 6 Operational Training Unit (OTU). It was equipped with Bristol Blenheims and operated within No. 17 Group, Coastal Command. Its task was to re-train Westland Lysander pilots onto Bristol Blenheim Mk. Vs in the ground attack role, to serve primarily in the Middle East and Far East. No 6 OTU was absorbed into No. 42 OTU on 18 July 1941, moving to RAF Ashbourne in October 1942.

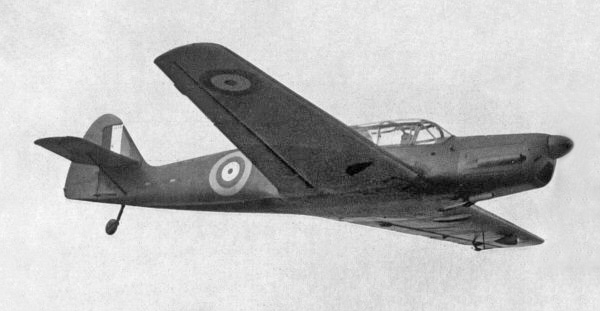
Me 108 Aldon of the Maintenance Command Communications Squadron

The Maintenance Command Communications Squadron from 1942 used three Messerschmitt Bf 108 Taifuns, known in RAF service as the Aldon. Two were impressed from pre-war British civilian owners, and one was taken over from the German Embassy when war was declared. Writing from RAF records over 50 years later, Lake indicates that the squadron was established on 1 May 1944; and then reduced to flight status on 1 August 1949, remaining at Andover througohut.

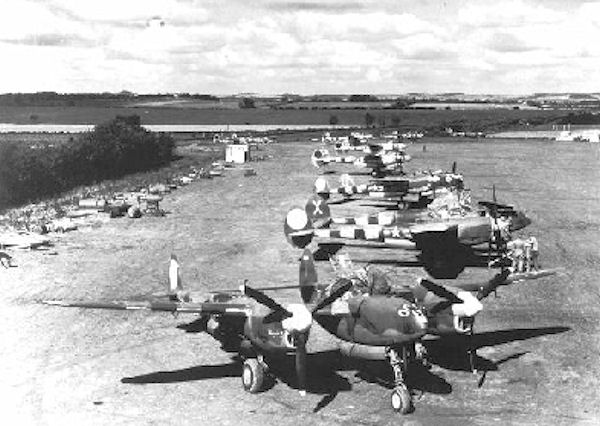
Lockheed P-38s of the USAAF's 370th Fighter Group at RAF Andover, June 1944

From February through July 1944, Andover was used by fighter squadrons (the 401st, 402nd, and 485th squadrons of the 370th Fighter Group) of the 71st Fighter Wing of the Ninth Air Force of the United States Army Air Forces, flying Lockheed P-38 Lightning aircraft. Flying from RAF Andover, the 370th dive-bombed radar installations and flak towers, and escorted bombers that attacked bridges and marshalling yards in France as the Allies prepared for the invasion of the Continent. The 370th also provided cover for Allied forces that crossed the English Channel on D-Day and flew armed reconnaissance missions over the Cotentin Peninsula until the end of the month. The 370th Fighter Group moved to their Advanced Landing Ground (ALG) at Cardonville, France (ALG A-3) on 20 July. The USAAF lost a total of 31 P-38s from Andover before the move to France.

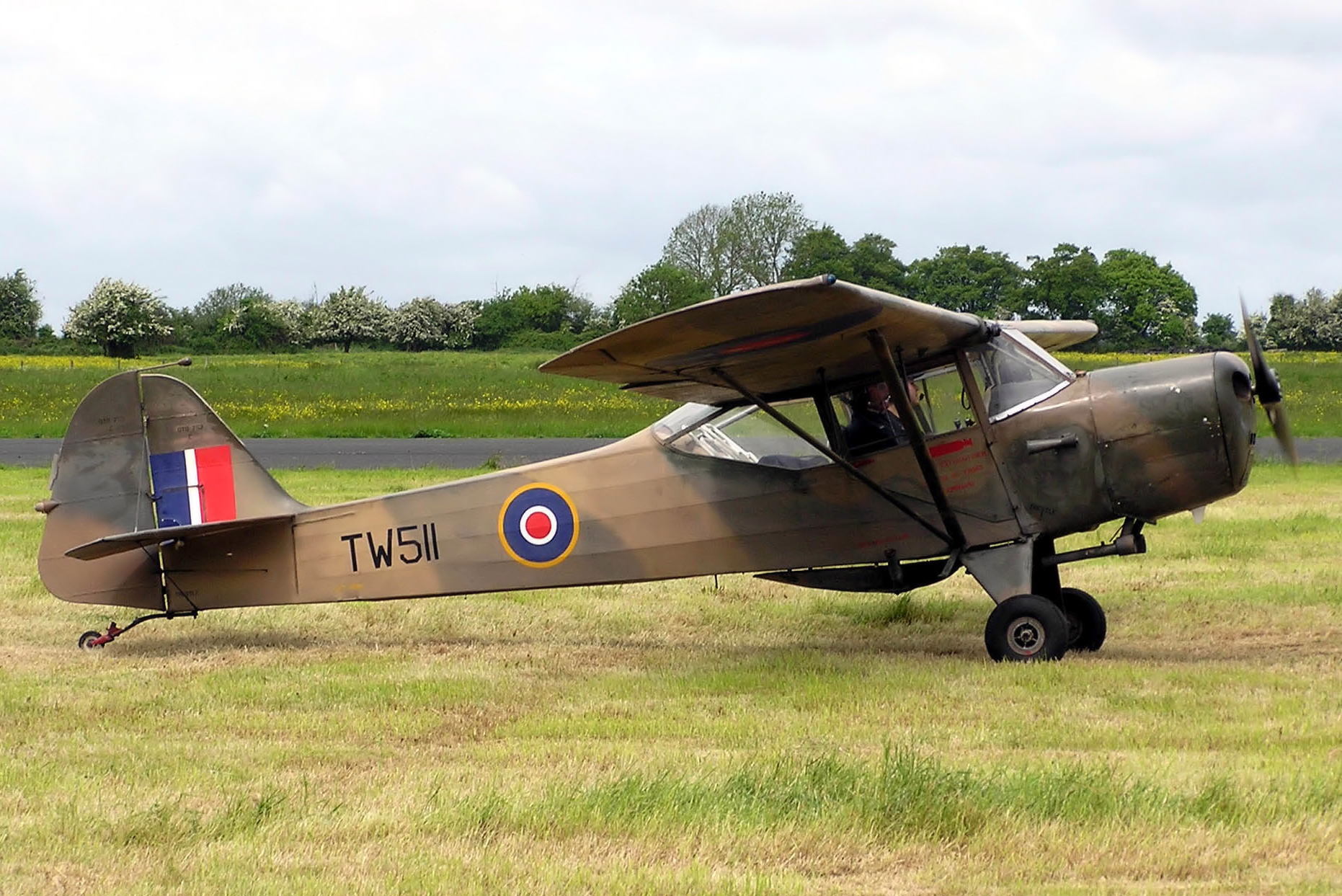
Taylorcraft Auster Mk. V

Three Canadian Army air observation post (AOP) squadrons of the Royal Canadian Air Force – No. 664 Squadron RCAF, No. 665 Squadron RCAF, and No. 666 Squadron RCAF – were formed at RAF Andover between 9 December 1944 and 5 March 1945, equipped with Auster Mark IV and V aircraft. The pilots and observers were officers recruited from the Royal Canadian Artillery and O.R.s from the Royal Canadian Artillery and Royal Canadian Air Force. The pilots were trained to fly de Havilland Tiger Moth aircraft at No. 22 Elementary Flying Training School RAF (Cambridge); thereafter, successful candidates were further trained at No. 43 Operational Training Unit, the Air Observation Post School based at RAF Andover which was dedicated to training British and Commonwealth AOP flight-crews.

Lieutenant-Colonel Terry Willett, Royal Artillery, commanded No. 43 OTU at RAF Andover as the first officer to command the AOP training organisation. Among the Canadian students trained by No. 43 Operational Training Unit at RAF Andover for No. 666 Squadron RCAF was Captain James Doohan, who later achieved fame as an actor playing Star Trek's Chief Engineer Lieutenant Commander Scott. While under training he flew an Auster Mark IV between two telegraph poles on Salisbury Plain, to prove it could be done.

British Army AOP training at RAF Andover, with Auster Mark V aircraft, continued until at least 1949. One of the three squadrons was re-established after the war as 665 Squadron, Army Air Corps, based in Northern Ireland.

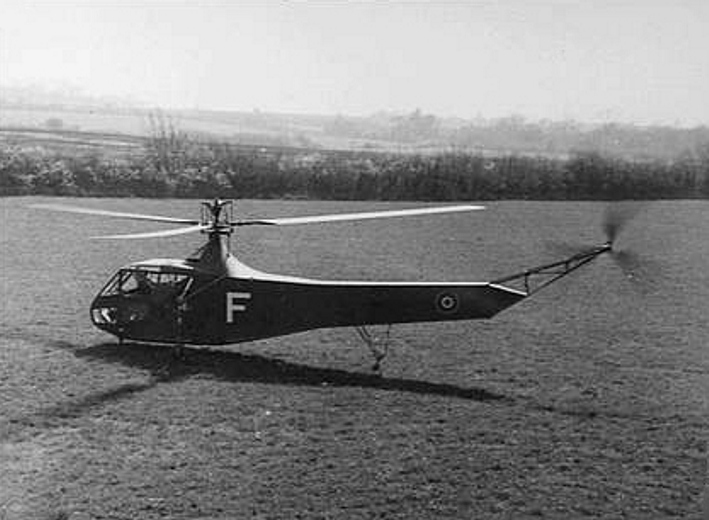
Sikorsky R-4B Hoverfly taking off from RAF Andover in April 1945.

RAF Andover has a unique place in British history: the first British military unit to be equipped with helicopters, the Helicopter Training Flight, was formed in January 1945 as part of 43 OTU under the command of Squadron Leader B. H. Arkell. This was also the first European helicopter flying-training school, although the first European military unit formed solely with helicopters was the Luftwaffe's Transportstaffel 40 in 1944. The Helicopter Training Flight was equipped with nine Sikorsky R-4B Hoverfly I helicopters, and trained 100 British Army pilots for AOP duties, as well as pilots for the first RAF squadron to be equipped with helicopters, 526 Squadron, which carried out radar calibration duties.

=== 1945 to 1977 ===
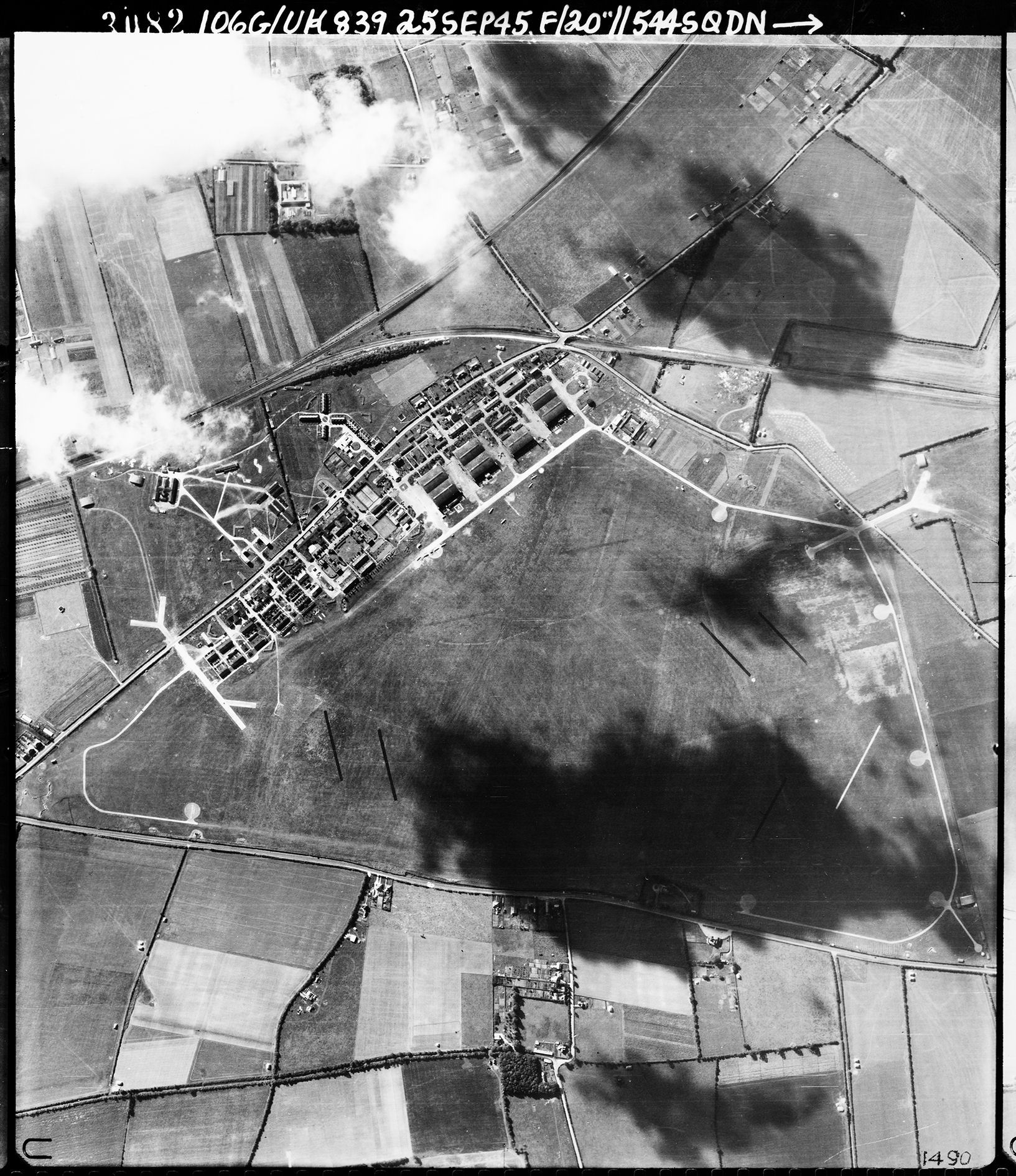
Aerial photo oriented to the south of RAF Andover, 25 September 1945

Post-war, RAF Andover continued to be used for helicopter flying training and operational research, C Flight of 657 Squadron, Army Air Corps, being renamed 1901 (Air Observation Post) Flight in February 1947. The Flight used six Sikorsky R-6A Hoverfly II (an improved version of the Hoverfly I) helicopters, and Auster AOP.6 aircraft to train British Army and Royal Air Force pilots and carry out operational trials. The Hoverfly IIs had little effective operational capability, but gave the Army valuable experience in the helicopter's potential use. In addition to artillery direction, the Flight's experimental activities included photography, radar trials, air/ground communications, and fighter evasion. In January 1948, the Flight moved to Middle Wallop.

The Maintenance Command Communication Squadron, which had been briefly reformed, was finally disbanded for the last time in August 1949.

On 14 September 1955, RAF Andover was honoured with the freedom of the Borough of Andover. No. 12 Squadron RAF took part in the ceremony with a flypast of its English Electric Canberra B Mk. 6 bombers, to mark the Squadron's pre-war association with RAF Andover.

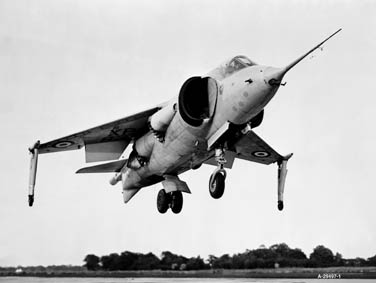
The Hawker P.1127

Andover continued its association with pioneering the use of helicopters in Britain when the Joint Experimental Helicopter Unit, a joint Royal Navy Fleet Air Arm, Army Air Corps and Royal Air Force unit exploring operational helicopter roles, was based at the station from 1958 to 1959. The unit used Westland Whirlwind helicopters and was disbanded at the end of 1959 to form No. 225 Squadron RAF.

The station's association with aviation research continued, as trials of the Hawker P.1127, the Hawker Siddeley Kestrel FGA 1 (both experimental vertical take-off aircraft), and the Hawker Siddeley Harrier partially took place on the station. The Harrier was the developed form of the P.1127 and Kestrel, and was the world's first operational vertical/short take-off and landing aircraft.

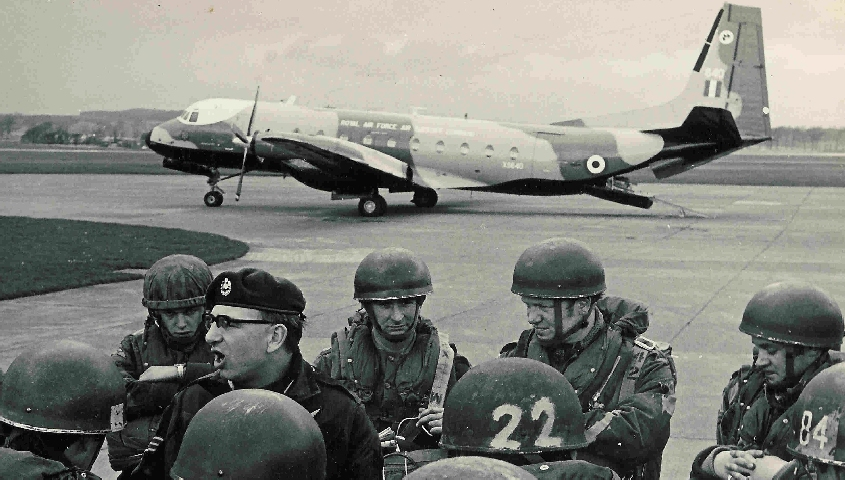
A Hawker Siddeley Andover C1

Trials of the Hawker Siddeley Andover (the second RAF aircraft of that name) were also partially carried out at RAF Andover. In commemoration of this, Hawker Siddeley presented the Borough of Andover with a framed photo of the aircraft, and the type was also named after the town. The Andover's main role in RAF service was tactical transport, for which its unique ability to "kneel" – to allow vehicle entry at a shallow angle via a rear ramp – was an asset. Other roles included aero-medical evacuation, STOL, and parachute and 1 ton container drops. The Andover could also be fitted with long-range ferry tanks, which enabled the short-range Andover to fly long distances, such as across the Atlantic Ocean. Andovers were still in RAF service for the photo reconnaissance role under the Open Skies Treaty and for use by the Empire Test Pilots' School until 2012.

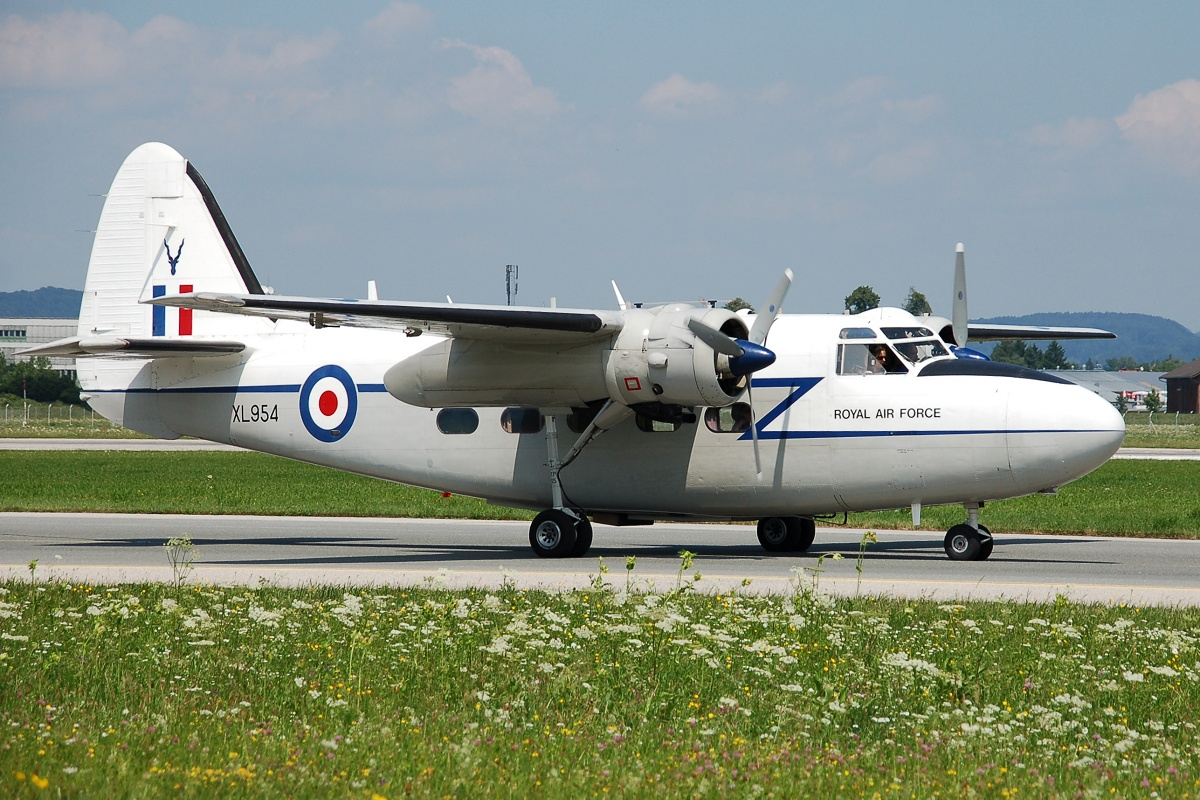
A Percival Pembroke of No. 21 Squadron RAF

RAF Andover was throughout the post-1945 period the home of a number of communications squadrons, the last one of which was No. 21 Squadron RAF, which used de Havilland Devon and Percival Pembroke aircraft. The squadron had been re-formed on 3 February 1969, when the Western Communication Squadron RAF was re-designated at RAF Andover. It provided transport for senior officers in the western part of the United Kingdom and was disbanded following defence cuts on 31 March 1976.

Just before the RAF station closed in 1977, 1213 (Andover) Squadron Air Training Corps moved into the building which had been used as Station Headquarters.

=== Post-RAF use ===
The RAF station was closed on 10 June 1977 and the airfield was handed over to the British Army. It was used by Army Air Corps units based at Middle Wallop, as well as Defence Equipment & Support (formed by the merger of the Defence Procurement Agency (DPA) and the Defence Logistics Organisation (DLO)). The last RAF personnel working in these units left in November 2009, and the occasion was marked by an RAF Farewell to Andover event and flypast including an RAF Hawker Siddeley Andover on 15 September (Battle of Britain Day) 2009.

The former airfield site retains an RAF link through the presence of 1213 (Andover) Squadron, Air Training Corps. Sometime after 1967 the Squadron was issued with a Percival Pembroke with the serial number WV742, maintenance number 8111M, for instructional use. This was around 1978 sold to a film company and transported to Ilkley Moor in Yorkshire for use in the TV series The Sandbaggers. A former cadet of the Squadron, Lieutenant-Commander Gordon Batt, DSC, of 800 Naval Air Squadron Fleet Air Arm, was killed in action during the Falklands War in 1982.

=== Squadrons ===
- No. 2 Squadron RAF
- No. 9 Squadron RAF
- No. 11 Squadron RAF
- No. 16 Squadron RAF
- No. 44 Squadron RAF
- No. 51 Squadron RAF
- No. 53 Squadron RAF
- No. 59 Squadron RAF
- No. 81 Squadron RAF
- No. 82 Squadron RAF
- No. 103 Squadron RAF
- No. 104 Squadron RAF
- No. 105 Squadron RAF
- No. 107 Squadron RAF
- No. 116 Squadron RAF
- No. 119 Squadron RAF
- No. 142 Squadron RAF
- No. 148 Squadron RAF
- No. 169 Squadron RAF
- No. 170 Squadron RAF
- No. 207 Squadron RAF
- No. 214 Squadron RAF
- No. 215 Squadron RAF
- No. 285 Squadron RAF
- No. 289 Squadron RAF
- No. 296 Squadron RAF
- No. 613 Squadron RAF
- No. 651 Squadron RAF
- No. 660 Squadron RAF
- No. 661 Squadron RAF
- 801 Naval Air Squadron
- 807 Naval Air Squadron
- 808 Naval Air Squadron
- 809 Naval Air Squadron
- 879 Naval Air Squadron
- 887 Naval Air Squadron

=== Units ===
The following units were also here at some point:

- No. 2 (Bomber) Group RAF (January 1937 – May 1938)
- No. 2 School of Army Co-operation (October 1939 – May 1941)
- No. 3 (Bomber) Group RAF (May 1936 – January 1937)
- No. 4 Fighter Command Servicing Unit
- No. 7 Group RAF (December 1919 – April 1926)
- No. 11 Group Pool RAF (January 1939 – July 1939)
- No. 15 (Pilots) Advanced Flying Unit RAF (December 1942 – February 1943)
- No. 26 Blind Approach Training Flight RAF (October 1941 – November 1941) became No. 1526 (Beam Approach Training) Flight RAF (November 1941)
- Satellite of No. 41 OTU RAF (May – June 1943, December 1943, February – March 1944, May 1944 & February 1945)
- No. 51 (Army Co-operation) Wing RAF (May 1939 – October 1939)
- No. 54 (Maintenance) Wing RAF (May 1942 – July 1942)
- No. 227 Operational Conversion Unit RAF (May 1947 – May 1950)
- A detachment of No. 431 Flight RAF (September – November 1940)
- No. 1900 Independent Air Observation Post Flight RAF (January 1947 - December 1948)
- No. 2759 Squadron RAF Regiment
- Air Component Field Force Communication Squadron RAF
- Air Navigation School RAF (January 1935 – January 1936)
- Army Co-operation Reservoir RAF (December 1939 – ?)
- Central Area RAF (October 1933 – November 1933)
- Maintenance Command Communication and Ferry Squadron RAF (November 1960 – March 1964) became Western Communication Squadron RAF (March 1964 – February 1969)
- Maintenance Command Communication Flight RAF
- Maintenance Command Communication Squadron RAF (May 1944 – ? & ? – August 1949)
- Meteorological Research Flight RAF (December 1950 – December 1952)
- RAF Staff College Flight RAF (April 1922 – April 1927)
- School of Air Pilotage RAF (September 1919 – April 1920) became Air Pilotage School RAF (April 1920 – January 1923)
- School of Instruction, Southern Training Brigade RAF (June 1918)
- RAF Support Command (September 1973 – June 1977)
- Wessex Bombing Area RAF (April 1926 – June 1926)
- Western Area RAF (October 1933 – May 1936)

=== The RAF Staff College ===
The RAF Staff College was founded at RAF Andover on 1 April 1922, to provide staff training to selected officers, usually of Flight Lieutenant or Squadron Leader rank to enable them to undertake staff officer duties at the Air Ministry, and Command or Group HQs. It was closed on the day that Britain declared war, 3 September 1939. But in November 1939, shortened courses were restarted until the college was placed under Care and Maintenance on 28 May 1940. The Staff College re-opened at Bulstrode Park in December 1941, the college returning to Andover in 1948. It was raised to Group status within Training Command on 1 June 1968 and eventually moved to Bracknell in 1970.

=== Legacy ===
Andover Road on the site of the former RAF Changi in Singapore is named after RAF Andover.

Museums preserve a number of aircraft which were based at RAF Andover during their service lives. The Royal Air Force Museum London preserves a Sikorsky R-4B Hoverfly I, an Avro Anson C. 19;, a De Havilland Devon C. 2, and a Percival Pembroke C. 1.

The Yorkshire Air Museum preserves a De Havilland Devon C. 2.

One of the Maintenance Command Communications Squadron Messerschmitt Bf 108 Taifuns, known in RAF service as the Aldon, is displayed by the Airbus Defence and Space Flugmuseum Messerschmitt in Manching. This example was originally owned by the German Embassy in London and had the RAF serial number AW167 before being sold to a Swiss owner who registered it as HB-ESM, before the Flugmuseum Messerchmitt acquired it as D-ESBH.

Two of RAF Andover's former gate guardians have been preserved. The Potteries Museum & Art Gallery in Hanley, Staffordshire preserves RAF Andover's former gate guardian in 1952 and 1963 to 1967, a Supermarine Spitfire LF Mk. XVIE with the serial number RW388. The RAF Museum preserves RAF Andover's former 1957 to 1962 gate guardian, a Supermarine Spitfire PR Mk. XIX with the serial number PM651.

Two Luftwaffe aircraft captured in 1945 were displayed at RAF Andover and are now preserved in the Royal Air Force Museum Midlands. A Messerschmitt Bf 110 G-4 night fighter was displayed at RAF Andover from 1949 to 1957, and a Junkers Ju 87 G-2, was displayed at RAF Andover in 1954.

== Redevelopment ==
When the A303 trunk road was straightened to bypass Weyhill to the south, its new route crossed the northern perimeter of the former airfield. In 2013 a solar farm was completed on the remainder of the site, south of the A303.

In 2007, the site of Andover Airfield became the focus of local controversy when developers submitted a planning proposal to build a large distribution centre for the Tesco supermarket company. According to the proposal, the main building would have been more than 85,000 sq metres (21 acres), which would make it one of the biggest buildings in Europe. Approval was granted in 2008 but the developer failed to reach agreement with Tesco; a regional distribution centre for the Co-op Group was built instead, and the rest of the site became a business park.

To mark the closure of the airfield for the redevelopment a sculpture by Chris Brammall, entitled Flight and Navigation, was unveiled on 6 October 2014. It features aircraft that flew from the airfield, and was unveiled with the last RAF flag to fly from the airfield when it was an RAF station. The flag had been kept by local Councillor Ian Carr, who was a navigator with No. 21 Squadron RAF flying de Havilland Devons from the airfield.

=== Marlborough Lines ===
From November 2009, a site on the former airfield was named Marlborough Lines and subsequently became home to the Army Headquarters.

== See also ==
- Amport House
