= Cape Poseidion (Arabia) =

Ancient promontory in Arabia

Cape Poseidion (Ancient Greek: Ποσείδιον ἄκρον, also known as Posidion or Poseideion) was a promontory on the coast of the Arabian Peninsula known in classical antiquity. Its exact location had been lost. Modern sources place it along the east coast of the Red Sea, with suggested locations ranging from Ras Muhammad in the north to Yemen in the south.

== Geography ==
Geographer Ptolemy placed Cape Poseidion on the Erythraean Sea past the straits. He recorded its location at 11° 30′ North latitude and 75° East longitude (Ptolemy's coordinates do not match the modern ones). In antiquity, the term Erythraean Sea generally referred to the modern Arabian Sea, the modern Red Sea was known as the Sinus Arabicus (Arabian Gulf).

The straits mentioned by Ptolemy are the modern Bab-el-Mandeb. Ptolemy noted that the cape was followed by the city of Sanina (the exact location of this settlement is unknown). Strabo stated that Cape Poseidion marked the beginning of the western side of Arabia, it was located opposite the Troglodyte coast in the inner corner of the Arabian Gulf. He described its surroundings as a continuous, well-watered land producing dates.

Hans Treidler placed the cape at the entrance to the Strait of Bab-el-Mandeb, roughly opposite the modern island of Perim. This location is near the coastal settlement of Sheikh Said, south of the city of Mocha (roughly corresponding to the modern coordinates 12°40′N 43°28′E). This coastal region of Arabia (known as the Tihamah) is highly fertile.

== History ==
The promontory was named after an altar of the sea god Poseidon, constructed by a Greek explorer Ariston, sent by a Ptolemaic king of Egypt (presumably Ptolemy II Philadelphus) to explore the eastern ocean (Indian Ocean) and the Arabian coast. No other information about this explorer is known.

The Ptolemaic dynasty sent out multiple explorers on extensive land and sea expeditions, resuming the exploration efforts interrupted for centuries due the decline of earlier local powers. Naval expeditions at the end of the 2nd century BC that followed Ariston's trip (e.g., those led by Eudoxus of Cyzicus) eventually reached the East Indies and the coast of East Africa.

== Sources ==
- Burton, Richard Francis (1878). The Gold-Mines of Midian and the Ruined Midianite Cities: A Fortnight's Tour in North-Western Arabia. London: C. Kegan Paul & Co.
- Treidler, Hans [in German] (1953). "2) Ποσείδιον ἄκρον" [Poseidion akron]. Paulys Realencyclopädie der classischen Altertumswissenschaft (in German). Vol. XXII, 1. pp. 421–422.
