= Ariston (explorer) =

Ariston (Ancient Greek: Ἀρίστων) was an explorer sent out by Ptolemy II Philadelphus of ancient Egypt to explore the western coast of Pre-Islamic Arabia, to prepare for a military action. Prior to this the main body of knowledge about the Arabian peninsula had come from the expeditions of Alexander the Great a century earlier. Ariston's expedition was some time between 280 and 276 BCE.

The periplus from the expedition survived long after the century in which the expedition happened, and is mentioned by several later writers like Eratosthenes and Agatharchides, and preserved by Strabo and Diodorus Siculus, who offer extracts and digests of Agatharchides. Cape Poseideion derived its name from an altar which Ariston had erected there to the Greek god Poseidon.

== Sources ==
- Treidler, Hans [in German] (1953). "2) Ποσείδιον ἄκρον" [Poseidion akron]. Paulys Realencyclopädie der classischen Altertumswissenschaft (in German). Vol. XXII, 1. pp. 421–422.
