= Ras Muhammad National Park =

Egyptian national park in South Sinai

Ras Muhammed National Park
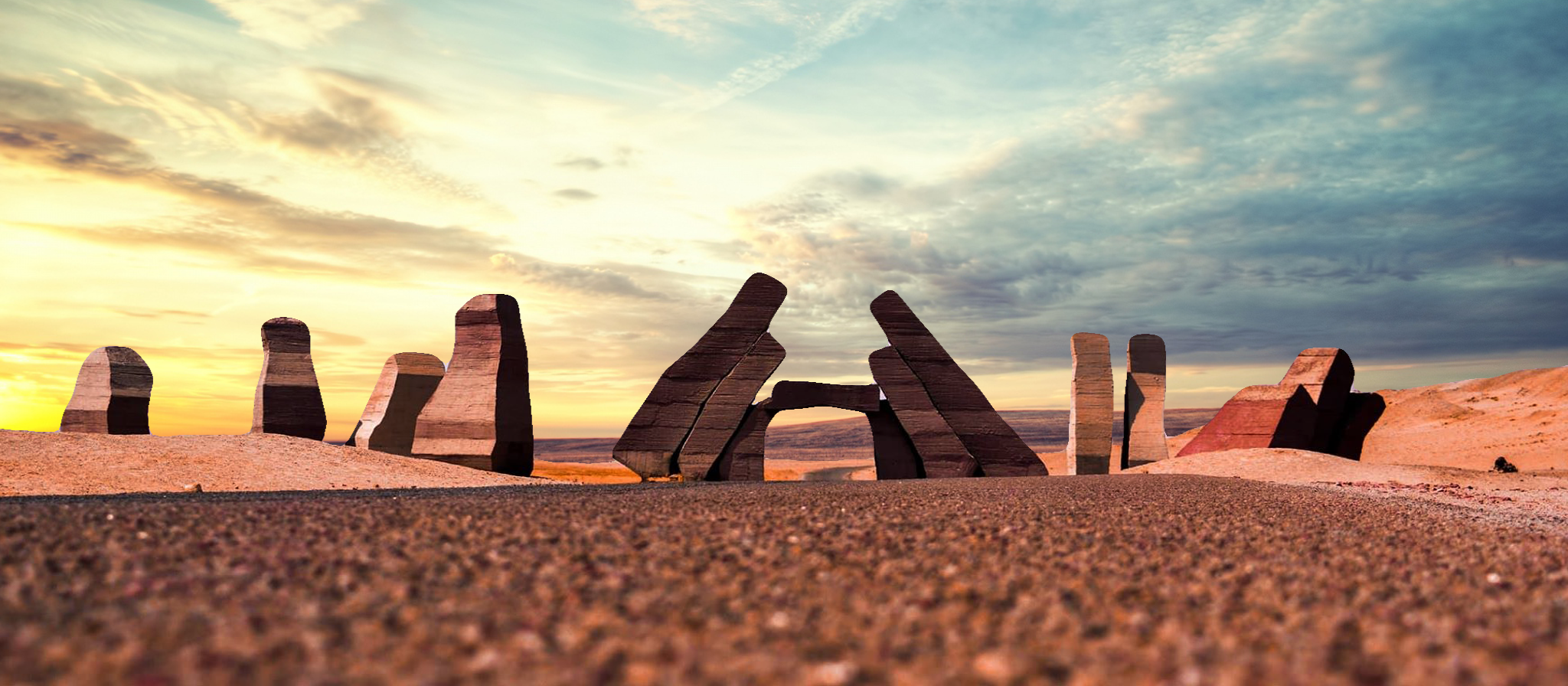
- Park entrance

- Location within Sinai Location within Egypt
- Location: South Sinai Governorate
- Nearest city: Sharm El Sheikh
- Coordinates: 27°46′10″N 34°12′35″E
- Area: 480 km^{2} (190 sq mi)
- Established: 1983
- Website: sharm-city.com

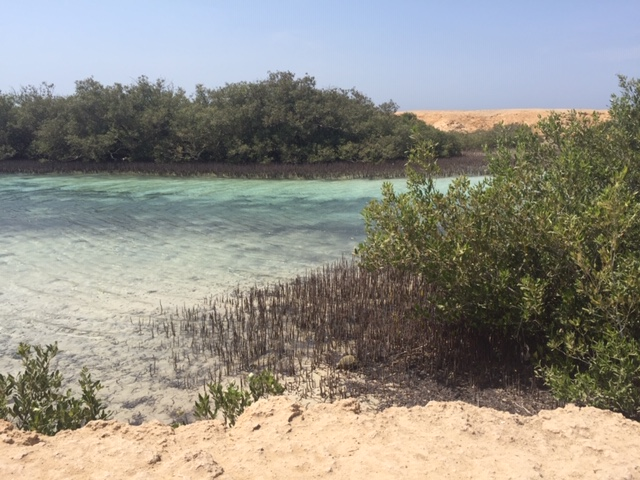
Mangrove forest in Ras Muhammad

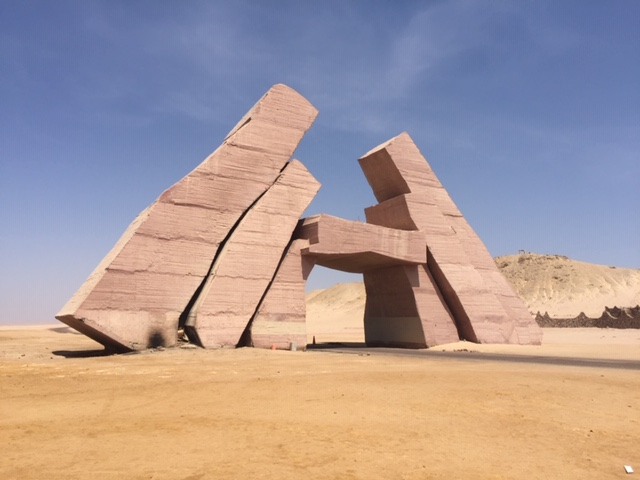
Gate of Allah designed and installed by Egyptian engineers in 1973

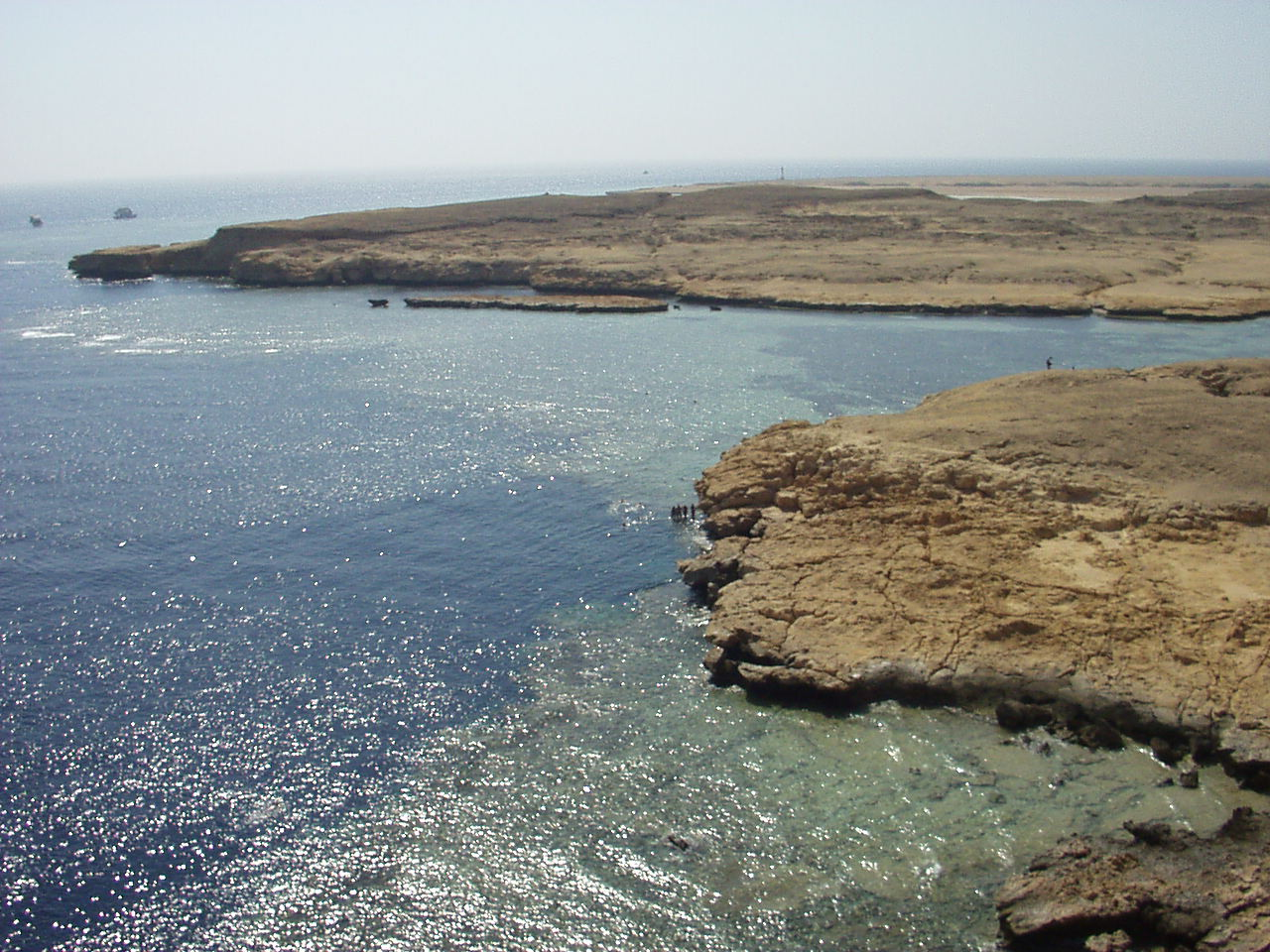
View of coral reef in Ras Muhammad (2004)

Ras Muhammad (Egyptian Arabic: راس محمد Rās Maḥammad, IPA: [ɾɑːs mæˈħæmmæd]; Arabic: رأس محمد Ra's Muḥammad) is a national park in Egypt at the southern extreme of the Sinai Peninsula, overlooking the Gulf of Suez on the west and the Gulf of Aqaba to the east. The park is becoming a center of eco-tourism in the region.

== History ==
The promontory was known as Poseidion (Ancient Greek: Ποσείδιον) in Antiquity, indicating that it used to have a shrine dedicated to Poseidon.

When the Sinai Peninsula was returned to Egypt, Ras Muhammad was declared for protection from fishing and other human activities. Some of the fishing methods, such as using dynamite and knives were also impacting on the coral reef and the fish populations. In 1983, the Egyptian Environmental Affairs Agency established the area as a marine reserve for the protection of marine and terrestrial wildlife. The park was also established to protect against urban sprawl from Sharm El Sheikh and other coastal development. The name literally means "Cape of Muhammad". In this instance, "Ras" (Arabic: Head) means "headland". It is said that the name arose because the contour of the cliff looks like the profile of a bearded man's face, with horizontal hard strata providing the nose and bearded chin.

== Geography ==
The park is situated in the tourist region of the Red Sea Riviera, located 12 km (7.5 mi) from the city of Sharm El Sheikh. The park spans an area of 480 km^{2} (190 sq mi), including 135 km^{2} (52 sq mi) of surface land area and 345 km^{2} (133 sq mi) area over water. Marsa Bareika is a small bay inlet in Ras Mohammed, and Marsa Ghozlani is a very small inlet located across from the park visitors center.

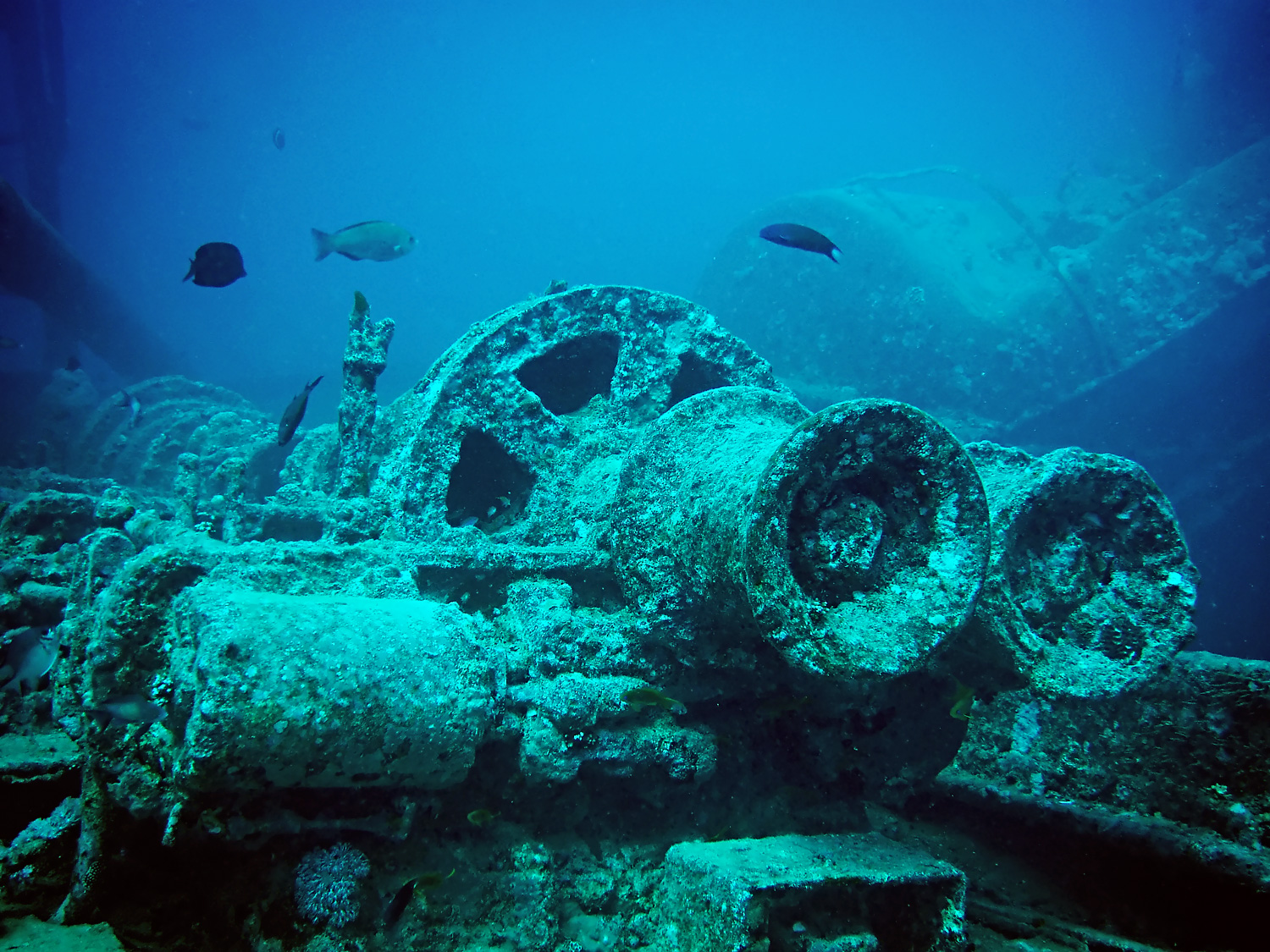
Winch parts visible on the wreck of the SS Thistlegorm, which sank off the coast of Ras Muhammad

The two islands of Tiran and Sanafir were part of the park until sovereignty of the islands was ceded to Saudi Arabia. Ras Muhammad exists at the junction of three plates: the Arabian plate, the African plate, and the Sinai subplate. This, in conjunction with the Northeast motion of the Sinai subplate, has caused recent seismicity, underwater caves formed as the result of earthquakes.

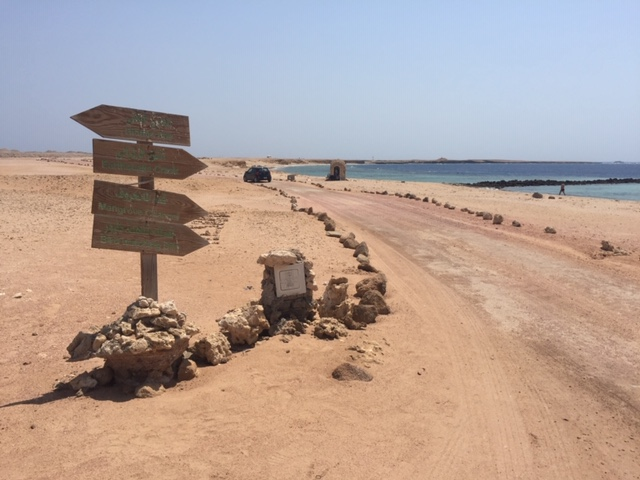
Ras Muhammad National Park

About 0.9 hectares of mangrove forest cover a 1.16 km (0.72 mi) shallow channel at the southernmost end of Ras Muhammad peninsula. Near the mangrove and approximately 150 m inland, there are open cracks in the land, caused by earthquakes. One of the cracks is approximately 40 m (130 ft) length and 0.20–1.5 m (0.66–4.9 ft) in width. Within the cracks, there are pools of water, some with a depth of over 14 m (46 ft).

The inland area includes a diversity of desert habitats such as mountains and wadis, gravel and coastal mud plains and sand dunes. The area also plays a role in bird migration, serving as a place of rest and nourishment.

== Climate ==
Ras Muhammad National Park experiences a very dry climate, with only minimal rainfall during the winter. During the summer, temperatures often exceed 40 °C (104 °F) and low temperatures around 27 °C (81 °F). Temperatures are mild during the winter, with daytime high temperatures averaging around 23 °C (73 °F) and low temperatures 14 °C (56 °F).

== Ecology ==
Coral reefs, of the fringing and hermatypic types, exist along the coast around Ras Muhammad close to the shoreline. More than 220 species of coral are found in the Ras Muhammad area, 125 of them soft coral. The coral reefs are located 50 to 100 m (160 to 330 ft) below the sea surface, and they have a width of 30 to 50 m (98 to 164 ft) in most places. Though in some spots on the western coast, the coral reef is 8 to 9 km (5.0 to 5.6 mi) wide. Shark Reef and Yolanda Reef are coral reefs hotspots for divers. Other coral reef sites include South Bereika, Marsa Ghozlani, Old Quay, and Shark Observatory. The wreckage of the SS Thistlegorm, located off the coast of Ras Muhammad, is a popular area for divers.

The area is home to more than 1,000 species of fish, 40 species of starfish, 25 species of sea urchins, more than 100 species of mollusks and 150 species of crustaceans. Among others, sea turtles, such as the green turtle (Chelonia mydas) and the hawksbill turtle (Eretmochelys imbricata) appear regularly in Ras Muhammad.

On the Ras Muhammad peninsula, there are acacia trees and doum palms (Hyphaene thebaica) around the wadi mouths. Ephemeral herbs and grasses also exist in Ras Muhammad.

== See also ==
- Ras Sedr
- Dahab
- Taba
- Nuweiba
- Sharm el-Sheikh
- List of cities and towns in Egypt
