= Pundit Beacon =

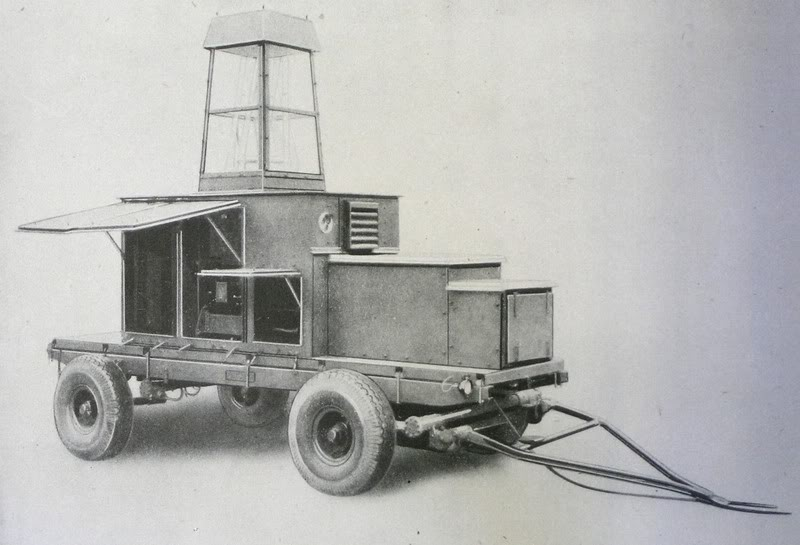
Pundit Light trailer

A Pundit Beacon or Landmark Beacon was an airfield navigational and identification beacon, used by the British Royal Air Force (RAF) in the period around World War II.

== Pundit Code ==
Each airfield was allocated a unique two letter Pundit Code, usually based on the name of the site, such as 'BL' for RAF Beaulieu. By the mid-war period the increasing number of airfields led to overlapping names. New codes were allocated by using the previously little-needed letters 'I', 'J', 'Q', 'U', 'V', 'Z' or 'X'. Harrowbeer thus became 'QB'. Some pre-war beacons had initially used a single letter code, but these were re-allocated two letter codes to avoid confusion with the lighthouse beacons.

Codes were visible from the air, with 10-foot (3.0 m) high letters displayed alongside the Signals Square and Watch Office, usually near the control tower. Established airfields had concrete letters set into the grass, as still survive at Beaulieu. Temporary or hurriedly constructed airfields used simple white paint on the tarmac.

== Pundit Beacon ==
By 1937, all airfields used for night flying were also equipped with a Pundit Beacon. This used red lamps to flash the two-letter Pundit Code in Morse. The beacon was visible all around in azimuth. The Morse code sequence was programmed for each beacon with a disc sequencer, a rotating disc with a ring of brass studs placed into it.

During wartime the red beacon became a familiar marker for returning bomber crews, signalling the end of a mission.

== Pundit Light ==
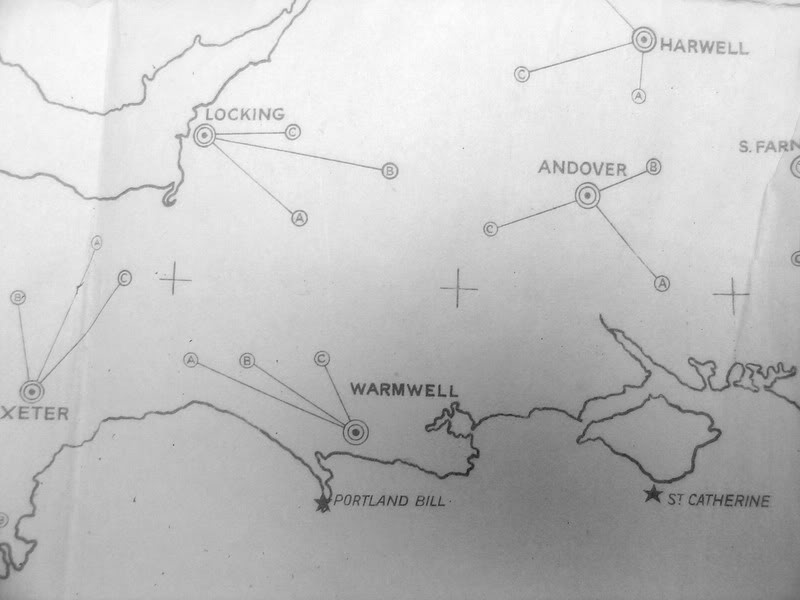
Map of airfields, showing associated light positions

A Pundit Light was a mobile Pundit Beacon.

As well as the obvious ability to move these mobile lights to temporary airfields they were also used to camouflage the airfield location from the enemy. The normal peacetime beacon location or light code was no longer used. Instead a mobile light was placed at one of three positions some distance from the airfield and a different wartime code was used: Elmdon (EK) used JD / KJ / UT in war, Ringway (EZ) used CL / HV / JL. The codes and their offset to the airfield location were distributed to flight crews and would change periodically. If an air raid was in progress at the airfield and so returning aircraft should divert elsewhere, its light location would also indicate this by also displaying a triangle of red lights surrounding it.

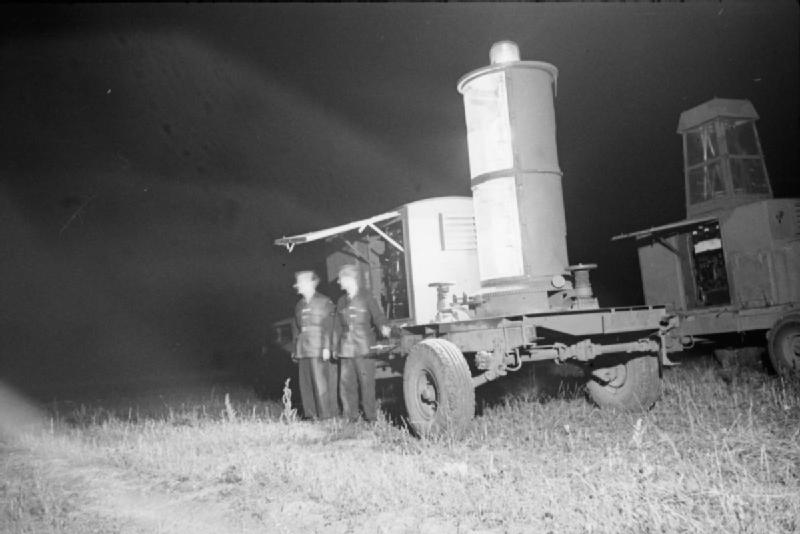
Chance light, with an unlit Pundit Light behind and to the right

The beacons were trailer-mounted. The beacon light itself consisted of eight 400 watt red neon tubes mounted in a glass pyramid lamp house. They were powered by a 16.9 bhp Coventry Climax petrol engine-generator set driving a set of eight induction coils to produce the high voltage needed by the neon tubes. The complete engine-generator, Morse code sequencer and lamp house was carried on the trailer. In transit, the lamp house was carried on the rear of the generator housing to reduce overall height, then put in place once on site.

Pundit Lights were part of the cargo of the SS Thistlegorm, a Merchant Navy ship sunk in the Red Sea in 1941, whilst en route to the Western Desert Campaign in Egypt. The wreck site is now a popular scuba diving location and the lights can still be seen in the ship's cargo hold. The unusual shape of the light trailers has sometimes led to them being mis-identified as the more familiar Rolls-Royce armoured cars.

A later, two-wheeled Pundit Light on a standard 0.75-long-ton (760 kg) Sankey trailer chassis is preserved at the Norfolk & Suffolk Aviation Museum, Flixton. These 1950s models were used on RAF bases in Germany into the 1980s and the end of the Cold War.

== Aerial Lighthouse ==
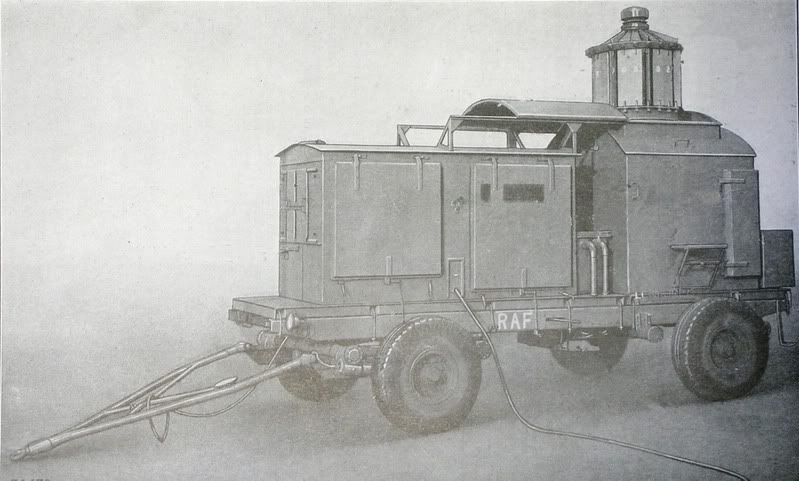
Aerial Lighthouse trailer, showing the shutters around the lamp house

The Aerial Lighthouse was used pre-war as a navigational beacons, as part of the Occult system. They indicated air routes and navigational markers, rather than airfields.

Each lighthouse signalled a single Morse letter. This letter was visible for around 60 miles (97 km), and was unique within a 150 miles (240 km) radius. Like the Pundit Light, they were also trailer-mounted with a generator set, but used a single continuous white lamp with the flashing provided by rotating shutters.

== See also ==
- List of former Royal Air Force stations, together with their Pundit codes
