= Advanced landing ground =

World War II temporary airfields

Advanced Landing Ground (ALG)
- UK, France, Netherlands, Belgium, Occupied Germany, Austria, Czechoslovakia
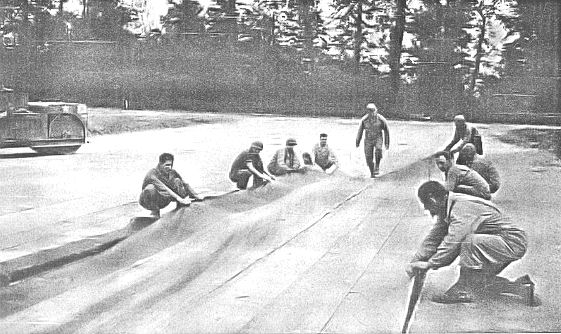
- Photo of the runway at Advanced Landing Ground A-43 (St Marceau, France) being constructed by IX Engineering Command, August 1944

Site information
- Type: Military airfield
- Controlled by: Royal Air Force; United States Army Air Forces

Site history
- Built: 1944–1945
- Battles/wars: European Theatre of World War II

Garrison information
- Occupants: RAF Second Tactical Air Force; Ninth Air Force; Twelfth Air Force

Advanced landing grounds (ALGs) were temporary advance airfields constructed by the Allies during World War II during the liberation of Europe. They were built in the UK prior to the invasion and thereafter in northwest Europe from 6 June 1944 to V-E Day, 7 May 1945.

Unlike the permanent airfields built in the United Kingdom and designed for the strategic bombardment of Germany, the tactical combat airfields on the continent were temporary, often improvised airfields to be used by the tactical air forces to support the advancing ground armies engaged on the battlefield. Once the front line moved out of range for the aircraft, the groups and squadrons moved up to newly built ALGs closer to the ground forces and left the ones in the rear for other support uses, or simply abandoned them.

== Overview ==
When the Allies invaded Normandy on D-Day, Royal Air Force Airfield Construction Service engineers were among those in the initial assault waves. Their mission was to rapidly construct forward operating airfields, known as advanced landing grounds (ALGs), on the European continent. As the Allied armies advanced across France and into Nazi Germany, several hundred airfields were built or rehabilitated for use by the allied air forces.

For security reasons, the airstrips were referred to by a coded number instead of location. In the United Kingdom, USAAF installations were identified by three digit (AAF) numbers ranging from AAF-101 to AAF-925. After D-Day, continental airfields in the European Theater of Operations (ETO) were also assigned coded numbers. American airfields were given A-, Y-, or R-, prefixes and numbered consecutively from 1 to 99. Both "A" and "Y" designated airfields could be found in France, however many "Y" fields would also be in the Netherlands, Belgium and occupied areas of Germany. "R" coded fields were usually located in occupied Germany. British airfields on the continent were also consecutively numbered, but with a B-prefix.

The numbering system for airfields was sequentially assigned as airfields were allocated, not by location or by date of operational use. A-1, Saint Pierre du Mont, was declared operational on 13 June 1944; A-3 Cardonville on 14 June. However A-2, Cricqueville-en-Bessin, was declared operational a few days later on 19 June.

Also many of these airfields had no combat air group or squadron attached to them. They were designed for casualty evacuation and supply transport and consisted of a quickly built runway manned only by a small complement of station personnel with little or no infrastructure other than tents. As the ground forces moved east, wounded would be sent to the airfield to be picked up by C-47s and taken to hospitals in England or other rear areas. Also supplies would be airlifted to the fields and unloaded, to be quickly transported to the front line units. These were normally known as S&E Fields (Supply and Evacuation).

Once completed, airfields were usually utilised by the combat groups or squadrons within a day or so of being declared operational for military use by the IX Engineering command engineers. They would be used for perhaps a few days to a week, to several months, depending on the location, use, and operational requirements. Once the combat units moved up to the next assigned ALG, they could be utilised as S&E Fields, or deconstructed quickly and abandoned, with the land being released back to the landowners or civil authorities in the area.

== Construction ==
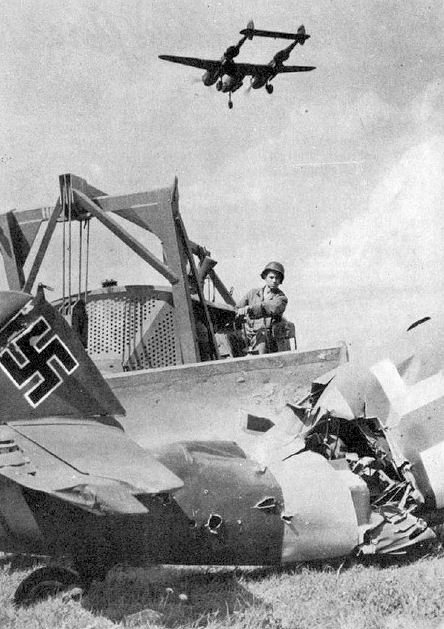
A USAAF Engineer clearing out the wreckage of a destroyed Luftwaffe Messerschmitt Bf 109 aircraft at an ALG, with a Lockheed P-38 Lightning flying overhead on landing approach

The mission for constructing ALGs was placed in the hands of the Airfield Construction Service of the RAF Second Tactical Air Force, whilst the USAAF's Ninth Air Force and its specially created engineering arm, the IX Engineer Command, were responsible for ALG's in the US sector of operations. Each aviation engineer battalion in the command (of a total of sixteen) was composed of sufficient men and equipment to quickly construct an airfield or landing ground for a single tactical fighter or bomb group unit.

ALGs were selected in two ways. First, existing enemy military or civilian airfields which were captured as the ground forces advanced were noted by engineers assigned to ground units. Second, engineers noted areas in grid locations where an airfield was desired, that had flat terrain, good land drainage, and where an airfield could be constructed quickly.

Captured airfields could be restored for use as advanced landing field in one to three days depending upon the amount of damage and the number of mines and booby traps encountered.

Dry-weather advanced landing fields were constructed by a single battalion at a favourable site in flat terrain in one to three days, including time for reconnaissance. At less favourable sites, where more clearing and grading were required, or all-weather fields which also needed additional infrastructure, the time varied from three to ten days.

ALGs were equipped with an access road that was connected to the existing road infrastructure; a dump for supplies, ammunition, and gasoline drums, along with a drinkable water and a minimal electrical grid for communications and station lighting. Tents were used for billeting and also for support facilities. Time was the all-important factor and ALGs serve its purpose if available for only a few days. As the forward area became the rear area, an advanced landing field could be improved for medium bomber use, but initially they primarily served fighter and transport groups.

Based on the experience obtained in the North African and Italian campaigns, fighter groups required an airfield 120 feet x 3600 feet long, and fighter-bomber groups required fields 120 feet x 5000 feet long. Medium bomb groups required 120 feet x 6000 feet runways.

=== Runway types ===
Instead of using rough, unimproved dirt strips, engineers used surfacing material necessary to strengthen the soil to support the weight of the aircraft and as a measure of insurance against the wet weather. Airfields were initially single runway landing strips which were laid down east–west (09/27) unless local conditions dictated a different runway direction.

- Sommerfeld Tracking

ALGs laid in the UK were of Sommerfeld Tracking, a form of stiffened steel wire mesh.

- Square-mesh track (SMT)

The surfacing material selected for the building of advanced landing grounds during the first weeks after the Normandy invasion was known as square-mesh track (SMT). SMT, a British development, was material composed of heavy wire joined in three-inch squares. It was chosen over other surfacing materials because it was very lightweight, allowing sufficient quantities to be transported across the English channel on over-tasked landing craft. Easily workable, a SMT landing mat for fighters could be laid like a carpet in about one week.

- Prefabricated Hessian (PBS)

After the initial batch of airfields was completed using SMT, the Army aviation engineers switched almost exclusively to another surfacing material known as prefabricated hessian (burlap) surfacing (PBS). Light and easily transportable, PBS did not create the dust problem encountered with SMT fields. Made of an asphalt-impregnated jute delivered in rolls 300 feet in length and 36 inches or 43 inches in width, PBS was laid in overlapping layers to produce a dust-free fair weather surface. It was also common to build airstrips using both SMT and PBS, laying SMT on top.

- Pierced steel plank (PSP)

To provide an all season durable airfield for the RAF's 2TAF and the USAF Ninth Air Force's medium and light bombers, a third type of surfacing material known as pierced steel plank (PSP), or Marston Matting was introduced on the Normandy bridgehead in July 1944. It consisted of 10-foot-long (3.0 m), 15-inch-wide (380 mm) steel planks joined together and laid perpendicular to the line of flight. Long used in other theatres, PSP would have been ideal for all airfields on the continent, but its limited availability and greater weight made this impractical. Moreover, because of supply problems, construction of even a PSP fighter-bomber field could take a month or longer, while similar PBS and SMT fields could be constructed in two weeks and one week, respectively.

In addition, sod and earth runways were built for emergency landing strips (ELS) and refuelling and rearming strips (R&R). Captured airfields contained a wide variety of runways, most commonly asphalt; concrete; macadam or tar-penetrated macadam.

=== Airfield types ===
There were five main types of airfields built by the USAAF combat engineers on the continent. These were:

- Emergency Landing Strip (ELS)

Consisted of a rough, graded runway approximately 2000 feet long to provide a place for emergency belly-landings of damaged aircraft.

- Supply and Evacuation (S&E)

Usually a rough graded runway near the front line or an airfield in the rear that was used by C-47s for transport of casualties to the rear, or delivery of supplies and munitions to the front line.

- Refueling and Rearming Strip (RRS)

Consisted of a runway and an aircraft marshalling area on each end of the runway. It was designed to provide an airfield near the front lines upon which aircraft based in rear areas could land, be refuelled and rearmed, and take off again on a mission without having to return to their home field in the rear. Also could be used for dispersal or for when services other than refuelling or rearming was required. These airfields could be expanded into advance landing grounds by the addition of dispersal and other station facilities. Generally if an R&R strip was built, it would be sited wherever possible with a view to further expand it later into an ALG.

- Advanced landing grounds (ALG)

An advanced landing ground could be constructed as such from the beginning or by development from an R&R Strip by the addition of dispersal facilities, expansion of the road network and other additions to the station and technical area in order for it to be used over an extended period of time.

- Tactical air depots (TAD)

A number of ALGs were expanded into tactical air depots by the addition of hangars, shops, more dispersal hardstands, roads, and other facilities. Some were developed from the beginning.

== Deployment ==
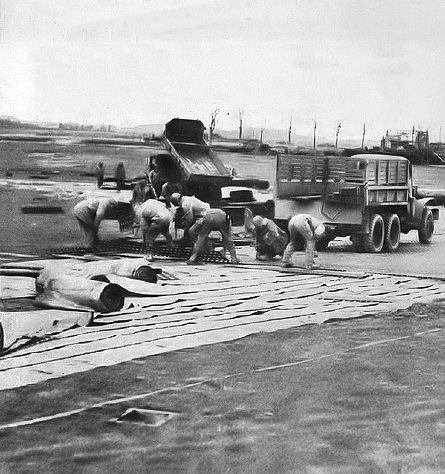
IX Engineering Command putting down a Pierced Steel Planking (PSP) Runway at an Advanced Landing Ground under construction

Four main designations were given to ALGs on the European Continent:

- "A" ALGs were located in France. They were constructed and used by Ninth Air Force units during the Invasion of Normandy (6 June – Mid July 1944) and during Operation Cobra, the break-out from Normandy, starting on 25 July 1944 until 25 August 1944. Those in Normandy were mostly decommissioned after their combat use, however others in Central France were used in various non-combat roles until the end of the war.
- "B" ALGs were built by American or British combat engineers for Royal Air Force use. Some of these were also used by USAAF Troop Carrier Groups and Command and Control organisations.
- "Y" ALGs were initially located in Southeastern France, built by Twelfth Air Force engineers as part of Operation Dragoon, the invasion of Southern France. Initially uncoded, they were given "Y" designations when they came under IX Engineering Command control in late 1944. ALGs were also coded "Y" in Northeastern France, Belgium; The Netherlands and Occupied Germany, after "A" coding reached 99 November 1944.
- "R" ALGs were located in Occupied Germany. Many more were constructed than are listed here, consisting primarily of Supply and Evacuation airfields either laid down quickly in agricultural areas or on captured Luftwaffe airfields. "R" coding began after Y-coding reached 99 in April 1945.

An unforeseen development was the extraordinary demand for transport, supply, and evacuation fields as the Allied armies pushed past Paris toward the German frontier. In late 1944, supplies could not keep pace with U.S. General Dwight D. Eisenhower's forces, and to help lessen the supply shortage airfields for C-47 Skytrain cargo planes became a priority. Bringing in ammunition of all types and especially gasoline on the trip to the ALGs on the continent, the C-47s on the return trip evacuated wounded to the rear.

By 15 September 1944, IX Engineer Command had placed over eighty ALG airfields in operation, while British engineers had constructed 76 airfields in their zone. In Southern France, another twenty or so fields had been built by American engineers from Twelfth Air Force from the Mediterranean Theater of Operations (MTO). In October these uncoded airfields were assigned to the ETO and given ALG code numbers.

The stabilisation of the front lines in the Netherlands, Belgium, and eastern France in mid-September 1944, which would last into the new year, allowed aviation engineers a chance to reorganise and prepare for the upcoming winter season. As expected, they could not build new PHS and SMI airstrips during the fall rain and winter snow seasons because of the moist ground. Besides concrete, the American-made PSP was the only available surfacing material that could be laid down during this inclement weather in Europe.

To keep the supply lines open, selected airfields in Belgium and France were therefore "winterized" with PSP. Because of the limited supply of PSP, however, only a limited number of airfields could be winterised, making it necessary to base two group sized units per airfield. But sufficient fighter-bomber and medium bomber airfields were completed that winter to ensure 2TAF and Ninth Air Force aircraft could continue flying combat missions.

The major problem affecting airfield construction in early 1945 was not the surprise German Ardennes counteroffensive (which caused the abandonment of only one airfield – Y-39, Haguenau). Rather, an early February thaw threatened to make airfields inoperable due to the mud and water. Using local civilian labour, engineers performed extensive maintenance on the threatened airfields and successfully resolved the crisis.

The renewed allied offensive in early 1945, following the Battle of the Bulge, was supported in earnest by the building of tactical airfields in occupied Germany. Trier (Y-57), became the first operational tactical American airfield on German soil on 10 March 1945. When a crossing over the Rhine River was spearheaded at Remagen, Germany, a supply and evacuation strip was quickly set up to support the bridgehead. As Allied tank columns struck out rapidly into the heartland of Germany, the airfield "clutches" of the Ninth Air Force's tactical air commands moved east of the Rhine river within range of virtually any target in Germany.

Scores of former Luftwaffe sod and hard surfaced airfields were captured in the lightning advance through Central Germany, virtually undamaged, lessening the requirement for SMT, PHS, and PSP prefabricated surfacing. The relative lack of German military opposition in late March, April and May 1945 lessened the need for close air support and produced a greater demand for supply airstrips to keep the offensive moving. Every opportunity was used to clear captured German airfields for use along the armies' route, allowing C-47s and other transports to land with food, gas, and ammunition. The supply effort received top airfield priority. By V-E Day, 9 May 1945, 76 of the 126 airfields made operational east of the Rhine river were strictly supply and evacuation fields.

== Summary ==
USAAF Engineers constructed or rehabilitated over 280 continental airfields in the ETO from D-Day to V-E Day. In the summer months that followed, a few new airfields were constructed, but the vast majority were abandoned and turned over to local landowners or civil governments. Throughout Western Europe, as well as the airfields built by Twelfth and Fifteenth Air Forces in the MTO, a significant number were developed into permanent, civilian airports or NATO military bases after the war.

The airfield coding system remained in effect until after the Japanese surrender in the Pacific, when, on 14 September 1945, the system was officially discontinued. Thereafter, airfields were referenced by their geographic name.

== Airfields ==
Only active combat ALGs are shown. Dedicated S&E, Liaison, Transport, and other non-combat airfields are not listed. Runway types are listed as follows:

- ASP Asphalt
- BRK Brick
- CON Concrete
- ETH Compressed earth
- MAC Macadam
- PHS Prefabricated Hessian surfacing
- SMT Square-mesh track
- SOD Sod
- PSP Pierced steel planking
- TAR Tar-penetrated macadam

Runway dimensions are in feet.

=== United Kingdom (Kent) ===
Advanced landing grounds were built in Kent during 1943 and 1944 for several reasons. The first being a requirement by the allies to station short-range fighters close to the English Channel coast so missions could be undertaken to attack enemy coastal fortifications; road and rail networks and other military targets in Occupied France prior to the invasion of Normandy. Also construction of the ALGs provided necessary engineering and construction training as well as providing practical experience in the development of forward airfields which would be necessary on the continent after the invasion. The ALGs laid down in Kent had two runways, while the ones laid down in France after the invasion generally had only one strip laid down east–west for speed of construction

Due to their temporary nature, the airfields were torn up and salvageable components were re-used on new ALGs in France after the assigned units were moved forward onto French ALGs after the invasion of Normandy.

Advance landing grounds in United Kingdom
Station name (USAAF No.)	County	In use	
RAF Appledram	West Sussex	June 1943 –July 1944	
RAF Ashford (AAF-417)	Kent	August 1943 – September 1944	
RAF Brenzett (AAF-438)	Kent	September 1943 – December 1944,	Initially used to relieve pressure on RAF Kingsnorth. From July used by No. 133 Wing RAF for operations against V-1 flying bombs
RAF Headcorn (AAF-412)	Kent	August 1943 – August 1944	
RAF High Halden (AAF-411)	Kent	April – September 1944	
RAF Kingsnorth (AAF-418)	Kent	August 1943 – September 1944	
RAF Lashenden (AAF-410)	Kent	August 1943 – September 1944	
RAF Lymington (AAF-551)	Hampshire		
RAF Needs Oar Point	Hampshire	April 1944 - July 1944	
RAF Staplehurst (AAF-413)	Kent	August 1943 – July 1944	
RAF Woodchurch (AAF-419)	Kent	July – September 1943	373rd Fighter Group

=== Normandy campaign ===
Airfields in France used in support of the invasion and establishment of Allied forces in Normandy, France, during Operation Overlord and the immediate aftermath, 6 June – 24 July 1944

	Operational	Notes
ELS-1 Poupeville, France	6 June 1944 – unknown	First USAAF Airfield in Liberated France. 49°23′02″N 001°20′00″W; Runway: 2000x100 SOD (05/23); Emergency Landing Strip
A-1 Saint-Pierre-du-Mont, France	13 June 1944 – 5 September 1944	Located: 49°23′27″N 000°56′41″W Runway: 5000x120, SMT, (09/27) Used by: 366th Fighter Group, 17 June – 24 August 1944 (Republic P-47 Thunderbolt) 401st Fighter Squadron, 24 July – 15 August 1944 (Lockheed P-38 Lightning)
A-2 Cricqueville-en-Bessin (Cricqueville), France	16 June 1944 – 15 September 1944	Located: 49°21′57″N 001°00′26″W Runway: 5000x120, SMT/ETH, (17/35) Used by: 354th Fighter Group, 22 June – 13 August 1944 (North American P-51 Mustang) 367th Fighter Group, 14 August – 4 September 1944 (P-38)
A-3 Cardonville, France	14 June 1944 – 1 September 1944	Located: 49°21′17″N 001°02′37″W Runway: 5000x120, SMT (15/33) Used by: 368th Fighter Group, 20 June – 23 August 1944 (P-47) 370th Fighter Group, 24 July – 15 August 1944 (P-38)
A-4 Deux-Jumeaux, C	30 June 1944 – 15 September 1944	Located: 49°20′40″N 000°58′48″W Runway: 5000x120, SMT (11/29) Used by: 48th Fighter Group, 18 June – 29 August 1944 (P-47) (Note: Including 492nd Fighter Squadron, 493rd Fighter Squadron, 494th Fighter Squadron) 107th Tactical Reconnaissance Squadron, 28 June – 5 July 1944 (P-51/F-5)
A-5 Chippelle Airfield, France	5 July 1944 – 9 July 1944	Located: 49°14′25″N 01°00′28″W Runway: 5000x120, SMT (06/24) Used by: 404th Fighter Group, 6 July – 29 August 1944 (P-47)
A-6 Beuzeville-la-Bastille (Beuzeville), France	Established 7 June 1944. Opened: 12 June 1944 Closed: 18 September 1944	49°25′16″N 001°18′16″W; Runway: 5000x120, SMT (05/23) : Used by 371st Fighter Group, 18 June – September 1944 (P-47), 367th Fighter Group, 22 July – 14 August 1944 (P-38)

- A-9 Le Molay-Littry (Le Molay), France

Located: 49°15′42″N 000°53′29″W
Opened: 30 June 1944 Closed: 5 October 1944
Runway: 4000x120, SMT (04/22)
Used by:

67th Tactical Reconnaissance Group, July – August 1944 (F-4/P-38; F-5/P-51)
12th Tactical Reconnaissance Squadron, 5 July – 11 August 1944 (F-5/P-51)

- A-11 Saint-Lambert, France

Located: 49°17′01″N 001°05′54″W
Opened: 5 August 1944 Closed: 11 September 1944
Runway: 5000x120, PHS (05/23)
Used by:

474th Fighter Group, 6–29 August 1944 (P-38)

- A-12 Lignerolles, France

Located: 49°10′32″N 000°47′24″W (abandoned)
Opened: 18 July 1944 Closed: 4 November 1944
Runway: 5000x120, PHS (07/25)
Used by:

362d Fighter Group, 2 July – 10 August 1944 (P-47)
365th Fighter Group, 15 August – 3 September 1944 (P-47)

- A-13 Tour-en-Bessin, France

Located: 49°17′27″N 000°44′59″W
Opened: 28 July 1944 Closed: 2 December 1944
Runway 1: 5000x120, PSP (12/30)
Runway 2: 5000x120, PSP (01/19)
Used by:

373d Fighter Group, 19 July – 19 August 1944 (P-47)
406th Fighter Group, 5–17 August 1944 (P-47)
394th Bombardment Group, 25 August – 18 September 1944 (Martin B-26 Marauder)

- A-21 Saint-Laurent-sur-Mer, France

Located: 49°21′49″N 000°52′26″W
Opened: 8 June – 25 August 1944
Runway: 3400x120, ETH (11/28)
Used as: Casualty evacuation and transport Airfield (IX Service Command)

- A-22 Colleville-sur-Mer, France

Located: 49°21′15″N 000°49′41″W
Opened: 13 July – 4 November 1944
Runway: 3750x120, PBS (09/27)
Used as: Transport Airfield

=== Cotentin Peninsula/Brittany Breakout ===
- ELS Avranches, France

Located: 48°39′50″N 001°24′09″W
Established: 8 August 1944: Closed: (Undetermined)
Runway: 3600x120 SOD (05/23)

Emergency Landing Strip

- A-7 Azeville, France

Located: 49°28′56″N 001°18′27″W
Opened: 24 June 1944 Closed: 15 September 1944
Runway: 3600x120, SMT (08/26)
Used by:

365th Fighter Group, 28 June – 15 August 1944 (P-47)
363d Fighter Group, August – September 1944 (P-51)

- A-8 Picauville, France

Located: 49°23′34″N 001°25′07″W
Opened: 26 June 1944 Closed: 15 September 1944
Runway: 5000x120, PHS (07/25)
Used by:

405th Fighter Group, 30 June – 14 September 1944 (P-47)

- A-10 Carentan, France

Located: 49°18′18″N 001°10′46″W
Opened: 16 June 1944 Closed: 4 November 1944
Runway: 5000x120, PHS (08/26)
Used by:

50th Fighter Group, 25 June – 16 August 1944 (P-47)
392d Fighter Squadron, 22 July – 14 August 1944 (P-38)

- A-14 Cretteville, France

Located: 49°20′17″N 001°22′39″W
Opened: 4 July 1944 Closed: 5 September 1944
Runway: 5000x120, (3600 PHS/1400 ETH) (04/22)
Used by:

358th Fighter Group, 3 July – 14 August 1944 (P-47)
406th Fighter Group, 17 August – 4 September 1944 (P-47)

- A-15 Maupertus-sur-Mer (Maupertus), France

Located: 49°39′03″N 001°28′31″W
Now: Cherbourg - Maupertus Airport or Aéroport de Cherbourg – Maupertus (IATA: CER, ICAO: LFRC)
Opened: 4 July 1944 Closed: 22 December 1944
Runway 1: 6000x120, PSP (11/29)
Runway 2: 5000x120, PSP (17/35)
Used by:

363d Fighter Group, 9 July – August 1944 (P-38)
387th Bombardment Group, 22 August – 18 September 1944 (B-26)
422d Night Fighter Squadron, 25 July – 28 August 1944 (P-61)

- A-16 Brucheville, France

Located: 49°22′05″N 001°13′18″W
Opened: 2 August 1944 Closed: 5 September 1944
Runway: 5000x120, (3600 PHS/1400 ETH) (07/25)
Used by:

36th Fighter Group, 4 July – 25 August 1944 (P-47)

- A-17 Méautis, France

Located: 49°16′55″N 001°17′50″W
Opened: 17 August 1944 Closed: 7 September 1944
Runway: 5000x120, (3600 PHS/1400 ETH) (10/28)
Used by:

50th Fighter Group, 16 August – 4 September 1944 (P-47)

- A-18 Saint-Jean-de-Daye, France

Located: 49°13′04″N 001°09′11″W
Opened: 29 August 1944 Closed: 9 September 1944
Runway: 5000x120, (3600 PHS/1400 ETH) (06/24)
Emergency Landing/Refueling Field

- A-19 Saint-Georges d' Elle (50) (La Vieille), France

Located: 49°09′36″N 00°58′36″W
Opened: 14 August 1944 Closed: 7 September 1944
Runway: 5000x120, (3600 PHS/1400 ETH) (01/19)
Used by:

370th Fighter Group, 15 August – 6 September 1944 (P-38)

- A-20 Lessay, France

Located: 49°12′08″N 001°30′29″W
Now: Lessay Airport (IATA: XDR, ICAO: LFOM)
Opened: 25 August 1944 Closed: 28 September 1944
Runway 1: 6000x120, PSP (06/24)
Runway 2: 5000x120, PSP (12/30)
Used by:

323d Bombardment Group, 26 August – 21 September 1944 (B-26)

- A-23 Querqueville, France

Located: 49°39′51″N 001°41′38″W
Opened: 6 July – 8 August 1945
Runway: 4600x120, PSP (10/28)
Used by: Detachment, 27th Air Transport Group (ATC)

- A-24 Biniville, France

Located: 49°25′42″N 001°28′33″W
Opened: 17 July – 21 August 1944
Runway: 3600x120, ETH (04/22)
Used by: Detachment, 125th Liaison Squadron

- A-25 Bolleville, France

Located: 49°18′06″N 001°34′28″W
Opened: 7 August 1944 – 3 March 1945
Runway: 3932x120, SMT & PBS (11/29)
Used as: Transport Airfield

- A-26 Gorges, France

Located: 49°14′34″N 001°23′44″W
Opened: 16 August 1944 Closed: 28 September 1944
Runway: 6000x120, PSP (07/25)
Used by:

397th Bombardment Group, 11 August – September 1944 (B-26)

- A-27 Rennes/St-Jacques, France

Located: 48°04′19″N 001°43′56″W
Now: Rennes - Saint-Jacques Airport (IATA: RNS, ICAO: LFRN)
Captured 7 August 1944 Opened: 10 August 1944 Closed: 30 November 1944
Runway 1: 5593x260, CON (10/28)
Runway 2: 4676x260, CON (14/32)
Used by:

362d Fighter Group, 10 August – 19 September 1944 (P-47)
10th Reconnaissance Group, 11 August – September 1944 (P-38/F-5; P-51/F-6)

- A-29 Saint-James, France

Located: 48°31′25″N 001°19′24″W
Opened: 14 August 1944 Closed: 28 September 1944
Runway: 5000x120, PHS (13/31)
Used by:

373d Fighter Group, 19 August – 19 September 1944 (P-47)

- A-30 Courtils, France

Located: 48°37′42″N 001°24′27″W (approximately)
Opened: 13 August – 5 September 1944
Runway: 3600x120, ETH (10/28)
Used as: Transport Airfield

- A-31 Gaël, France

Located: 48°04′52″N 002°11′46″W
Captured: 10 August 1944 Opened: 11 August 1944 Closed: 28 September 1944
Runway: 4500x120, SOD/ETH (08/26)
Used by:

354th Fighter Group, 13 August – 17 September 1944 (P-51)

- A-32 Nantes/Chateau-Bougcn, France

Construction Cancelled

- A-33 Vannes, France

Located: 47°43′10″N 002°43′25″W
Now: Meucon Airport (IATA: VNE, ICAO: LFRV)
Captured 10 August 1944 Opened: 29 August 1944 Closed: 20 June 1945
Runway 1: 6000X200, CON/TAR (13/31)
Runway 2: 4400x200, CON/TAR (04/22)
Used by:

425th Night Fighter Squadron, 18 August – 11 September 1944 (P-61)

- A-51 Morlaix, France

Located: 48°36′03″N 003°49′00″E
Opened: 1 September – 8 November 1944
Runway: 40500x120 CON (05/23)
Use: Transport Airfield

=== Northern France Campaign ===
The US marks the "Northern France Campaign" from the break-out following the invasion of Normandy to September 1944.

==== Drive to the Seine River ====
- A-28 Pontorson, France

Located: 48°32′42″N 001°29′49″W
Opened: 10 August 1944 Closed: 28 September 1944
Runway: 5000x120, (3600 PHS/1400 ETH) (08/26)
Used by:

358th Fighter Group, 14 August – 14 September 1944 (P-47)

- A-35 Le Mans, France

Located: 48°00′27″N 000°11′54″E
Captured: 12 August 1944 Opened: 3 September 1944 Closed: 20 November 1944
Runway: 5000x120, PHS (14/32)
Used by:

36th Fighter Group, 25 August – September 1944 (P-47)
440th Troop Carrier Group, 30 September – 2 November 1944 (C-47)

- A-34 Gorron, France

Located: 48°24′45″N 000°48′41″W (approximately)
Opened: 27 August – 4 November 1944
Runway: 3600x120, ETH (08/26)
Used as: Emergency Landing/Refueling Airfield

- A-37 Lombron, France

Located: 49°04′45″N 000°25′00″E (approximately)
Opened: 3–28 September 1944
Runway: 5000x120, PBS (08/26)
Used as: Emergency Landing/Refueling Airfield

- A-38 Montreuil, France

Located: 48°05′29″N 000°11′16″E
Opened: 4 September 1944 Closed: 5 October 1944
Runway: 5000x120, (3600 PHS/1400 ETH) (01/19)
Used by:

363d Tactical Reconnaissance Group, 4 September – October 1944

- A-39 Châteaudun, France

Located: 48°03′28″N 001°22′44″E
Now: Châteaudun Airport (IATA: XSU, ICAO: LFOC)

Also Châteaudun Air Base (BA 279)

Captured 20 August 1944 Opened: 26 August 1944 Closed: 8 August 1945
Runway 1: 7250x262, CON (10/28)
Runway 2: 5600x262, CON (05/23)
Used by:

10th Reconnaissance Group, November 1944 (P-38/F-5; P-51/F-6)
422d Night Fighter Squadron, 28 August – 16 September 1944 (P-61)
387th Bombardment Group, 18 September – 30 October 1944 (B-26)
439th Troop Carrier Group, 4 November 1944 – 7 September 1945 (C-47)

- A-40 Chartres, France

Located: 48°27′24″N 001°31′10″E
Now: Chartres-Champhol Airport (IATA: QTJ, ICAO: LFOR)
Captured 21 August 1944 Opened: 26 August 1944 Closed: Undetermined
Runway: 5500x260, CON/PSP (08/26)
Used by:

368th Fighter Group, 23 August – 11 September 1944 (P-47)
323d Bombardment Group, 21 September – 13 October 1944 (B-26)

- A-41 Dreux/Vernouillet, France

Located: 48°42′22″N 001°21′42″E
Now: Vernouillet Airport (IATA: XDR, ICAO: LFON)
Captured 21 August 1944 Opened: 26 August 1944 Closed: Undetermined
Runway 1: 5500x200, CON/PSP (02/20)
Runway 2: 4400x200, CON (12/30)
Used by:

366th Fighter Group, 24 August – 8 September 1944
397th Bombardment Group, 11 September – 6 October 1944
441st Troop Carrier Group, 3 November 1944 – 12 August 1945

- A-42 Vélizy-Villacoublay (Villacoublay), France

Also known as AAF-180
Located: 48°46′23″N 002°11′59″E
Now: Vélizy - Villacoublay Air Base (IATA code XIY) (ICAO code LFPV) (BA 107)
Captured 27 August 1944 Opened: 30 August 1944 Closed: August 1946
Runway : 4000x200, CON/TAR (13/31)
Used by:

48th Fighter Group, 29 August – 15 September 1944

- A-43 Saint-Marceau, France

Located: 48°10′42″N 000°09′31″E
Opened: 31 August 1944 Closed: 20 November 1944
Runway : 5000x120, PHS (08/26)
Used by:

474th Fighter Group, 29 August – 6 September 1944
441st Troop Carrier Group, 2 October – 3 November 1944

- A-44 Peray, France

Located: 48°13′56″N 000°22′46″E
Opened: 2 September 1944 Closed: 20 November 1944
Runway : 5000x120, PHS (10/28)
Used by:

367th Fighter Group, 4–8 September 1944
442d Troop Carrier Group, 5 October – 7 November 1944

- A-45 Lonrai (Lonray), France

Located: 48°27′36″N 000°02′22″E
Opened: 3 September 1944 Closed: 20 November 1944
Runway : 5000x120, PHS (05/23)
Used by:

370th Fighter Group, 6–11 September 1944
439th Troop Carrier Group, 28 September – 4 November 1944

- A-46 Toussus-le-Noble, France

Also known as: AAF-384
Located: 48°45′05″N 002°06′22″E
Now: Toussus-le-Noble Airport (IATA: TNF, ICAO: LFPN)
Captured: 26 August 1944 Opened: 28 August 1944 Closed: 8 August 1945
Runway : 4070x106, SMT (07/25)
Used by:

67th Tactical Reconnaissance Group, August – September 1944

- A-47 Orly, France

Located: 48°43′24″N 002°22′46″E
Now: Paris-Orly Airport (IATA: ORY, ICAO: LFPO)
Captured 27 August 1944 Opened: 28 August 1944 Closed: Undetermined
Runway 1: 6137x197, CON (02/20)
Runway 2: 5170x197, CON (08/26)
Used by:

50th Fighter Group, 4–15 September 1944

- A-48 Brétigny, France

Located: 48°35′48″N 002°19′59″E
Now: Brétigny-sur-Orge Air Base (BA 217)
Captured 27 August 1944 Opened: 29 August 1944 Closed: 8 August 1945
Runway 1: 5100x197, CON/PSP (04/22)
Runway 2: 4880x197, CON/PSP (11/29)
Used by:

404th Fighter Group, 29 August – 13 September 1944
365th Fighter Group, 3–15 September 1944
409th Bombardment Group, September 1944 – February 1945
435th Troop Carrier Group, 13 February – 25 June 1945

- A-49 Beille, France

Located: 48°04′58″N 000°30′49″E
Opened: 15 August – 25 September 1944
Runway: 3600x150, SOD (07/25)
Use: Transport Airfield

- A-50 Orleans/Bricy, France

Located: 47°59′15″N 001°45′38″E
Now: Orléans - Bricy Air Base (BA 123) (IATA: XCR, ICAO: LFOK)
Captured 22 August 1944 Opened: 24 August 1944 Closed: Undetermined
Runway : 7788x263, CON (07/25)
Used by:

394th Bombardment Group, 18 September – 8 October 1944
440th Troop Carrier Group, 2 November 1944 – 18 October 1945

- A-53 Issy les Moulineaux, France

Located: 48°49′26″N 002°16′12″E
Opened: 29 August – 5 December 1944
Runway: 2100x120 SOD (05/23)
Use: Liaison Airfield

- A-57 Laval, France

Located: 48°04′24″N 000°46′08″W
Opened: 21 August – 5 December 1944
Runway 1: 3450x120 SOD (13/31)
Runway 2: 2400x120 SOD (04/22)
Use: Liaison Airfield

==== Pursuit to the German border ====
- A-36 Saint-Léonard, France

Located: 47°56′33″N 000°03′18″E
Opened: 4 September 1944 Closed: 28 September 1944
Runway: 5000x120, (3600 PHS/1400 ETH) (00/18)
Used by:

406th Fighter Group, 4–22 September 1944 (P-47)

- A-52 Étampes/Mondesir, France

Located: 48°02′06″N 003°25′12″E
Opened: 30 August – 25 September 1944
Runway: 4500x120 SOD (06/24)
Use: Transport Airfield

- A-54 Le Bourget, France

Located: 48°58′10″N 002°28′29″E
Now: Le Bourget Airport (IATA: IATA LBG ICAO LFPB)
Opened: 29 August 1944 – 1 May 1946
Runway 1: 4730x201 CON (08/26)
Runway 2: 4700x120 SOD (01/19)
Use: 27th Air Transport Group (ATC)

- A-55 Melun/Villaroche, France

Located: 48°36′19″N 002°40′11″E
Now: Melun-Villaroche Airport (ICAO: LFPM)
Captured: 1 September 1944 Opened: 15 September 1944 Closed: 8 August 1945
Runway 1: 5336x200, CON (01/19)
Runway 2: 5376x200, ASP (10/29)
Used by:

416th Bombardment Group, September 1944 – February 1945 (A-20)
436th Troop Carrier Group, 21 February – 15 July 1945 (C-47)

- A-56 Le Hamil, France

Located: 49°53′00″N 002°34′00″E
Opened: 27 August – 15 September 1944
Runway: 3000x120 ETH (04/22)
Use: Liaison Airfield

- A-58 Coulommiers/Voisins, France

Located: 48°50′16″N 003°00′10″E
Now: Coulommiers-Voisins Airport (ICAO: LFPK)
Captured: 1 September 1944 Opened: 8 September 1944 Closed: 8 August 1945
Runway 1: 6565x264, CON (09/28)
Runway 2: 6000x264, ASP (04/22)
Used by:

425th Night Fighter Squadron, 11 September – 13 October 1944 (P-61)
410th Bombardment Group, September 1944 – February 1945 (A-20)
437th Troop Carrier Group, 24 February – 28 July 1945 (C-47)

- A-59 Cormeilles-En-Vexin, France

Located: 49°05′47″N 002°02′26″E
Now: Pontoise - Cormeilles-en-Vexin Airport (IATA: POX, ICAO: LFPT)
Captured: 6 September 1944 Opened: 15 September 1944 Closed: 8 August 1945
Runway : 6413x165, CON (12/30)
Used by:

344th Bombardment Group, 30 September 1944 – 5 April 1945 (B-26/A-26)

- A-60 Beaumont-sur-Oise, France

Located: 49°10′02″N 002°19′13″E
Now: Persan-Beaumont Airport (ICAO: LFPA)
Captured: 3 September 1944 Opened: 26 September 1944 Closed: 17 July 1945
Runway : 5250x164, CON (05/23)
Used by:

386th Bombardment Group, 2 October 1944 – 9 April 1945 (B-26)
410th Bombardment Group, May – June 1945 (A-26)

- A-61 Beauvais/Tille, France (B-42 by Royal Air Force)

Pre war French airfield occupied by Luftwaffe in 1940.
Located: 49°27′16″N 002°06′46″E
Now: Beauvais–Tillé Airport ("Paris-Beauvais") (IATA: BVA, ICAO: LFOB)
Captured: 6 September 1944 Opened: 10 September 1944 Returned to French control 17 August 1945
Runway 1: 6023x164, CON (12/30)
Runway 2: 5510x164, CON (04/22)
Used by:

322d Bombardment Group, September 1944 – March 1945 (B-26)

- A-62 Reims/Champagne, France

Located: 49°18′37″N 004°03′03″E
Now: Reims - Champagne Air Base (IATA: RHE, ICAO: LFSR) (BA 112)
Pre-war French airbase. Captured from German forces on 30 August 1944. Opened: 3 September 1944 Returned to French control at end of war
Runway 1: 5000x100, PSP (05/23)
Runway 2: 5000x120, SOD (06/24)
Used by:

440th Troop Carrier Group, 11–30 September 1944 (C-47)
373d Fighter Group, 19 September – 22 October 1944 (P-47)

- A-63 Villeneuve/Vertus, France

Located: 48°54′19″N 004°00′07″E
Opened: 5 September 1944 Closed: 23 May 1945
Runway : 3600x150, SOD (07/25)
Used by:

441st Troop Carrier Group, 8 September – 2 October 1944

- A-64 Saint-Dizier/Robinson, France

Located: 48°38′09.54″N 004°53′58.72″E
Now: Saint-Dizier - Robinson Air Base (BA 113)
Captured: 7 September 1944 Opened: 10 September 1944 Closed: 7 May 1945
Runway 1: 5500x262, CON/PSP (12L/30R)
Runway 2: 4678x198, CON (12R/30L)
Used by:

10th Reconnaissance Group, September – November 1944 (P-38/F-5; P-51/F-6)
405th Fighter Group, 14 September – February 1945 (P-47)
367th Fighter Group, 1 February – 14 March 1945 (P-38)
27th Fighter Bomber Group, 22 February – 19 March 1945 (North American A-36) (12th AF)
415th Night Fighter Squadron, 18 March – 17 April 1945 (Northrop P-61 Black Widow)
417th Night Fighter Squadron, 5–24 April 1945 (P-61)

- A-65 Perthes, France

Located: 48°39′25″N 004°49′21″E
Opened: 9 September 1944 Closed: 5 October 1944
Runway : 5000x120, SOD (10/28)
Used by:

371st Fighter Group, 18 September – 1 October 1944 (P-47)

- A-66 Orconte, France

Located: 48°40′14″N 004°44′10″E
Opened: 15 September 1944 Closed: 1 December 1944
Runway : 5000x120, PHS (11/29)
Used by:

354th Fighter Group, 17 September – 1 December 1944 (P-47)

- A-67 Vitry-le-François (Vitry), France

Located: 48°43′32″N 004°35′07″E
Captured: 9 September 1944
Opened: 15 September 1944 Closed: 18 December 1945
Runway : 5000x120, PHS (09/27)
Used by: (Maurer p.452)

358th Fighter Group, 14 September – 16 October 1944 (P-47)

- A-68 Juvincourt-et-Damary (Juvincourt), France

Located: 49°25′53″N 003°53′07″E (abandoned)
Captured: 5 September 1944 Opened: 7 September 1944 Closed: 2 July 1945
Runway 1: 5500x160, CON (09/27)
Runway 2: 5420x160, CON (17/35)
Used by:

439th Troop Carrier Group, 8–28 September 1944 (C-47)
404th Fighter Group, 13 September – 4 October 1944 (P-47)
365th Fighter Group, 15 September – 4 October 1944 (P-47)
36th Fighter Group, 1–27 October 1944 (P-47)
367th Fighter Group, 28 October 1944 – 1 February 1945 (P-38)
368th Fighter Group, 27 December 1944 – 5 January 1945 (P-47)
410th Bombardment Group, February – May 1945 (A-20)

- A-69 Laon/Athies, France

Located: 49°35′47″N 003°42′31″E
Waa: Laon-Athies Air Base (abandoned)
Captured 7 September 1944 Opened: 10 September 1944 Closed: 23 May 1945
Runway : 5386x163, CON (08/26)
Used by:

368th Fighter Group, 11 September – 2 October 1944 (P-47)
323d Bombardment Group, 13 October 1944 – February 1945 (B-26)
416th Bombardment Group, February – May 1945 (A-20)

- A-70 Laon/Couvron, France

Located: 49°39′0″N 3°33′0″E
Now: Quartier Mangin sur l'ancienne base de Couvron (Armée de Terre)
Captured 7 September 1944 Opened: 9 September 1944 Closed: 23 May 1945
Runway 1: 5450x167, CON (02/20)
Runway 2: 5350x167, CON (10/28)
Used by:

50th Fighter Group, 15–28 September 1944 (P-47)
409th Bombardment Group, February – June 1945

- A-71 Clastres, France

Located: 49°45′25.61″N 003°12′43.71″E
Now: Saint-Simon - Clastres Air Base abandoned)
Captured: 7 September Opened: 9 September 1944 Closed: Unknown
Runway 1: 5730x164, CON (05/23)
Runway 2: 5963x164, CON (10/29)
Used by:

367th Fighter Group, 8 September – 28 October 1944 (P-38)
387th Bombardment Group, 30 October 1944 – 29 April 1945 (B-26)

- A-72 Peronne/St Quentin, France

Located: 49°52′11″N 003°01′43″E
Now: Peronne-St Quentin Airport (ICAO: LFAG)
Captured: 5 September Opened: 6 September 1944 Closed: Unknown
Runway 1: 5250x164, CON (04/22)
Runway 2: 5400x164, CON (09/27)
Used by:

474th Fighter Group, 6 September – 1 October 1944 (P-38)
397th Bombardment Group, 6 October 1944 – 25 April 1945 (B-26)

- A-73 Roye/Amy, France

Located: 49°39′32″N 002°49′16″E (abandoned)
Captured: 6 September Opened: 8 September 1944 Closed: 8 August 1945
Runway 1: 5600x164, CON (05/23)
Runway 2: 5965x164, CON (10/28)
Used by:

370th Fighter Group, 11–26 September 1944 (P-47)
391st Bombardment Group, 19 September 1944 – 16 April 1945 (B-26)
349th Troop Carrier Group, 13 April – July 1945 (C-47)

- A-74 Cambrai/Niergnies, France

Located: 50°08′08″N 003°15′53″E
Now: Cambrai-Niergnies Airport (ICAO: LFYG)
Captured: 10 September Opened: 12 September 1944 Closed: Unknown
Runway 1: 5330x164, CON/PSP (15/33)
Runway 2: 5068x164, CON/TAR (09/27)
Used by:

48th Fighter Group, 15–30 September 1944 (P-47)
394th Bombardment Group, 6 October 1944 – 2 May 1945 (B-26)

- A-75 Cambrai/Epinoy, France

Also known as B-72 (Royal Air Force)
Located: 50°13′50″N 003°09′48″E
Opened: 12–16 September 1944
Runway 1: 5300x165 CON (05/23)
Runway 2: 5425x165 CON/PSP (17/35)
Operated as: Emergency Landing/Refueling Airfield

- A-76 Athis, France

Located: 49°00′28″N 004°06′50″E (abandoned)
Captured: Opened: 4 September 1944 Closed: 4 October 1945
Runway : 5600x120, SMT (09/27)
Used by:

36th Fighter Group, 1 September – October 1944 (P-47)

- A-77 Sainte-Livière, France

Located: 48°35′30″N 004°52′01″E
Opened: 11 September – 10 May 1944
Runway: 3600x120 SOD (13/31)
Operated as: Transport Airfield

- A-79 Prosnes, France

Located: 49°10′34″N 004°16′20″E (abandoned)
Opened: 21 September 1944 Closed: 4 July 1945
Runway : 6000x120, PSP (08/26)
Used by:

362d Fighter Group, 19 September – 5 November 1944 (P-47)
425th Night Fighter Squadron, 13 October – 9 November 1944 (P-61)
438th Troop Carrier Group, February – May 1945 (C-47)

- A-80 Mourmelon-le-Grand, France

Located: 49°06′45″N 004°22′20″E (abandoned)
Opened: 20 September 1944 Closed: 2 July 1945
Runway : 6000x120, PSP (08/26)
Used by:

406th Fighter Group, 22 September 1944 – 2 February 1945 (P-47)
358th Fighter Group, 16 October – 9 November 1944 (P-47)
434th Troop Carrier Group, 24 March – July 1945 (C-47)

- A-81 Creil, France

Located: 49°15′13″N 002°31′10″E
Now: BA 110 Creil Air Base
Opened: 23 September 1944 – 8 May 1945
Runway 1: 5646x164 CON (07/25)
Runway 2: 5382x164 CON (14/32)
Use: 1st Transport Group (Provisional) (ATC)

- A-82 Verdun/Etain, France

Located: 49°13′36″N 005°40′20″E
Later: Étain-Rouvres Air Base
Opened: 19 September 1944 Closed: 22 May 1945
Runway: 5000x120, PSP, (08/26)
Used by:

362d Fighter Group, 5 November 1944 – 8 April 1945 (P-47)
425th Night Fighter Squadron, 9 November 1944 – 12 April 1945 (P-61)

- A-83 Denain/Prouvy, France

Also known as: B-74 (Royal Air Force)
Located: 50°19′33″N 003°27′38″E
Now: Valenciennes-Denain Airport (ICAO: LFAV)
Captured: 12 September
Opened: 14 September 1944 Closed: 25 June 1945
Runway: 5500x164, CON/PSP, (06/24)
Used by:

323d Bombardment Group, 15 February – May 1945 (B-26)

- A-88 Maubeuge, France

Located: 50°16′33″N 003°58′24″E
Opened: 9 November 1944 – 13 February 1945
Runway: 3600x150 SOD (05/23)
Use: Transport Airfield

- A-90 Toul-Croix De Metz Airfield, France

Located: 48°41′53.25″N 005°55′02.23″E
Now: Non-Aviation use (Industrial Estate)
Captured: 14 September 1944 Opened: 14 September 1944 Closed: 22 May 1945
Runway: 5000x120, PSP, (10/28)
Used by:

358th Fighter Group, 9 November 1944 – 2 April 1945 (P-47)

- A-91 Sedan, France

Located: 49°42′10″N 004°56′32″E
Opened: 14 September 1944 – 17 May 1945
Runway 1: 3600x120 SOD (07/25)
Runway 2: 3600x120 SOD (08/26)
Use: Transport Airfield

- A-94 Conflans-en-Jarnisy (Conflans), France

Located: 49°09′07″N 005°55′55″E
Now: Doncourt-lès-Conflans Airport (ICAO: LFGR)
Opened: 20 November 1944 Closed: 22 May 1945
Runway: 5000x120, PSP, (08/26)
Used by:

10th Reconnaissance Group, November 1944 – March 1945 (P-38/F-4; P-51/F-5)
367th Fighter Group, 14 March – 20 April 1945 (P-38)

- A-95 Nancy/Azelot, France

Located: 48°35′30″N 006°14′22″E
Opened: 31 October 1944 – 5 November 1945
Runway: 5000x120 PSP (01/19)
Use:

XIX TAC Provisional Reconnaissance Group (November 1944 – April 1945)

162d Tactical Reconnaissance Squadron
111th Tactical Reconnaissance Squadron

69th Tactical Reconnaissance Group (March – April 1945)

- A-96 Toul/Ochey, France

Located: 48°34′59.75″N 005°57′15.67″E
Now: Nancy - Ochey Air Base (BA 133)
Opened: 9 October 1944 Closed: 11 May 1945
Runway: 5000x120, PSP, (07/25)
Used by:

50th Fighter Group, 3 November 1944 – 20 April 1945 (P-47)
415th Night Fighter Squadron, 30 November 1944 – 18 March 1945 (P-61)
27th Fighter Bomber Group, 19 March – April 1945 (P-47) (12th AF)

- A-98 Rosieres En Haye, France

Located: 48°46′48″N 005°58′48″E
Now: Toul-Rosières Air Base (BA 136)
Opened: 21 November 1944 Closed: 22 May 1945
Runway: 5000x120, PSP, (03/21)
Used by:

354th Fighter Group, 1 December 1944 – 8 April 1945

- A-99 Mars-la-Tour, France

Located: 49°05′54″N 005°53′09″E
Opened: 28 September 1944 – 2 January 1945
Runway: 3600x120 SOD (04/22)
Use: Transport Airfield

- Y-1 Tantonville, France

Located: 48°27′30.48″N 006°09′05.70″E
Opened: 25 December 1944 Closed: 29 May 1945
Runway: 5000/120, PSP, (02/20)
Used by:

371st Fighter Group, 20 December 1944 – 15 February 1945 (P-47)
86th Fighter Group, 20 February – 17 April 1945 (P-47) (12th AF)

- Y-2 Luneville, France

Located: 48°35′35.79″N 006°32′36.44″E
Now: Lunéville-Croismare Airport (ICAO: LFQC)
Opened: January 1945 Closed: 29 May 1945
Runway: 5000/120, PSP, (09/27)
Used by:

324th Fighter Group, 4 January – 8 May 1945 (P-47) (12th AF)

- Y-3 Avril, France

Construction cancelled

- Y-4 Buc, France

Located: 48°46′24″N 002°11′57″E
Opened: 28 August 1944 – 5 December 1945
Runway 1: 3300x120 SOD (07/25)
Runway 2: 3300x120 SOD (13/31)
Use:

109th Tactical Reconnaissance Squadron, August – September 1944
47th Liaison Squadron, September 1944
112th Liaison Squadron, September 1944 – June 1945

- Y-28 Verdun/Charny, France

Located: 49°09′43″N 005°23′08″E (approximately)
Opened: 11 September 1944 – 25 June 1945
Runway: 3000/80 SMT (01/19)
Use: Liaison Airfield

- Y-31 Bulgnéville, France

Located: 48°12′30″N 005°50′06″E (approximately)
Opened: 4 November 1944 – 6 January 1945
Runway 1: 4500x125 SOD (09/27)
Runway 2: 4100x120 PSP (06/24)
Use: Liaison Airfield

- Y-33 Thionville, France

Located: 49°21′37″N 006°10′22″E (approximately)
Opened: 29 November 1944 – 16 June 1945
Runway: 3600x120 PSP (02/20)
Use: Transport Airfield/Tactical Air Depot

- Y-34 Metz, France

Located: 49°04′18″N 006°07′57″E
Now: Metz-Frescaty Air Base (BA 128)
Opened: 25 December 1944 Closed: 29 May 1945
Runway: 5000x120, PSP, (02/20)
Used by:

365th Fighter Group, 27 December 1944 – 30 January 1945 (P-47)
368th Fighter Group, 5 January – 15 April 1945 (P-47)
406th Fighter Group, 2–8 February 1945 (P-47)
371st Fighter Group, 15 February – 7 April 1945 (P-47)

- Y-35 Compiegne/Margny, France

Now: Compiègne - Margny Airport (IATA: XCP, ICAO: LFAD)
Located: 49°26′00″N 002°48′16″E
Opened: 15 December 1944 – 30 May 1945
Runway 1: 3000x120 SMT (05/23)
Runway 2: 3300x120 SMT (12/30)
Runway 3: 3500x100 PSP (14/32)
Use: Transport Airfield

- Y-39 Haguenau, France

Located: 48°47′41″N 007°48′55″E
Now: Haguenau Airport (ICAO: LFSH)
Opened: 20 December 1944 Closed: 17 July 1945
Runway 1: 3400x160, CON, (07/25)
Runway 2: 3200x180, CON, (03/21)
Used by:

69th Reconnaissance Group, 2 April – 30 June 1945 (P-38/F-4; P-51/F-5)

- Y-42 Nancy/Essey, France

Now: Nancy-Essey Airport (IATA: ENC, ICAO: LFSN)
Located: 48°41′28″N 006°13′40″E
Opened: 15 October 1944 – 30 September 1945
Runway 1: 3000/100 SOD (15/33)
Runway 2: 3600/100 PSP (08/26)
Use:
14th Liaison Squadron, October – December 1944
Headquarters: 71st Fighter Wing, 16 July – 25 September 1945

=== Southern France Campaign ===
- Y-5 Ambérieu-en-Bugey (Ambérieu), France

Located: 45°59′14.41″N 005°19′42.40″E
Now: Ambérieu-en-Bugey Air Base (BA 278)
Opened: September 1944 Closed: 29 May 1945
Constructed by MTO (12AF) Engineers
Runway: 6000/100, ETH, (01/19)
Used by:

324th Fighter Group, 6–20 September 1944 (P-47) (12th AF)

- Y-6 Lyon/Bron, France

Located: 45°43′46″N 004°56′20″E
Now: Lyon-Bron Airport (IATA: LYN, ICAO: LFLY)
Captured: September 1944 Opened: September 1944 Closed: 20 June 1945
Repaired by MTO (12AF) Engineers
Runway: 6000/130, CON/PSP, (17/35)
Used by:

79th Fighter Group, September – November 1944 (P-47) (12th AF)

- Y-7 Dôle/Tavaux, France

Located: 47°02′20.45″N 005°25′38.10″E
Now: Dôle-Tavaux Airport (IATA: DLE, ICAO: LFGJ)
Captured: September 1944 Opened: September 1944 Closed: 17 July 1945
Repaired by MTO (12AF) Engineers
Runway: 5500/272, CON/PSP, (05/23)
Used by:

324th Fighter Group, 20 September 1944 – 4 January 1945 (P-47) (12th AF)
371st Fighter Group, 1 October – 20 December 1944 (P-47)
320th Bombardment Group, 1 April – 18 June 1945 (B-26)

- Y-8 Luxeuil, France

Now: Luxeuil Air Base (BA 116)
Located: 47°46′59″N 006°21′51″E
Opened: 22 September 1944 – 6 January 1945
Runway: 5000x120 PSP (04/22)
Use: Supply and Evacuation Airfield

- Y-9 Dijon/Longvic, France

Located: 47°15′57″N 005°05′42″E
Now: Dijon Air Base (BA 102) (IATA: DLE, ICAO: LFGJ)
Captured September 1944 Opened: September 1944 Closed: 1 July 1945
Repaired by MTO (12AF) Engineers
Runway: 6000/120, CON/PSP, (01/19)
Used by:

415th Night Fighter Squadron, 25 September – 30 November 1944 (P-61)
320th Bombardment Group, 11 November 1944 – 1 April 1945 (B-26)
17th Bombardment Group, 20 November 1944 – June 1945 (B-26) (12th AF)

- Y-11 Cannes/Mandelieu, France

Located: 43°32′47″N 006°57′15″E
Opened: 2 October – 23 November 1944
Constructed by MTO (12AF) Engineers
Runway: 3000x150 ETH
Use: Transport Airfield

- Y-12 St. Raphael/Frejus, France

Located: 43°25′02″N 006°44′08″E
Now: Frejus Airport (IATA: FRJ) (Closed)
Opened: 26 August 1944 Closed: 20 November 1944
Runway: 6000x150, SOD/ETH, (08/26)
Constructed by MTO (12AF) Engineers
Used by:

79th Fighter Group, 25 August – October 1944 (P-47) (12th AF)

- Y-13 Cuers/Pierrefeu, France

Now: Cuers Pierrefeu Airport (IATA: TLN, ICAO: LFTH)
Located: 43°14′49″N 006°07′30″E
Opened: 24 August – 20 November 1944
Constructed by MTO (12AF) Engineers
Runway: 5000x150 ETH (10/28)
Use: Emergency landing/refueling airfield

- Y-14 Marseilles/Marignane, France

Now: Marseille Provence Airport (IATA: MRS, ICAO: LFML)
Located: 43°26′12″N 005°12′54″E
Opened: 12 September 1944 – October 1945
Repaired by MTO (12AF) Engineers
Runway: 4850x150 SOD (15/33)
Use: Transport Airfield

1411th Army Air Force Base Unit, October 1944 – October 1945

- Y-15 Aix/Les Milles, France

Now: Aix-en-Provence Aerodrome (IATA: QXB, ICAO: LFMA)
Located: 43°30′19″N 005°22′02″E
Opened: 28 August – 20 November 1944
Repaired by MTO (12AF) Engineers
Runway: 4200x150 ETH
Use: Resupply/Casualty evacuation airfield

- Y-16 Salon, France

Located: 43°36′23″N 005°06′33″E
Now: Salon-de-Provence Air Base (BA 701)
Opened: 28 August 1944 Closed: 20 November 1944
Runway: 6000x150, SOD/ETH, (04/22)
Repaired by MTO (12AF) Engineers
Used by:

27th Fighter Bomber Group, 30 April – 11 September 1944 (P-47) (12th AF)
47th Bombardment Group, 7–18 September 1944 (A-20) (12th AF)

- Y-17 Istres/Le Tube, France

Also known as: AAF-196
Located: 43°31′28″N 4°56′30″E
Now: Istres-Le Tubé Air Base (BA 125)
Opened: 27 August 1944 Closed: Undetermined
Repaired by MTO (12AF) Engineers
Runway 1: 5800x197, ASP, (15/33)
Runway 2: 6000x150, ETH, (15/33)
Runway 3: 6000x200, ASP, (10/28)
Used by:

324th Fighter Group, 2–6 September 1944 (P-47) (12th AF)

- Y-18 Le Vallon, France

Located: 43°37′30″N 004°55′44″E (abandoned)
Opened: 30 August 1944 Closed: 20 November 1944
Constructed by MTO (12AF) Engineers
Runway: 7800x300, SOD, (13/31)
Used by:

415th Night Fighter Squadron, 1–25 September 1944 (P-61)
417th Night Fighter Squadron, 12 September – 5 April 1945 (Bristol Beaufighters) (12th AF)

- Y-19 La Jasse, France

Located: 43°39′28″N 005°00′44″E
Opened: 30 August – 20 November 1944
Runway: 6000x150 SOD (12/30)
Use: Emergency landing/refueling airfield

- Y-20 Sisteron, France

Located: 44°11′28″N 005°56′50″E
Opened: 28 August – 20 November 1944
Constructed by MTO (12AF) Engineers
Runway: 5000x150 SOD (17/35)
Use: Emergency Landing/Refueling Airfield

- Y-21 Montelimar/Ancone, France

Now: Montélimar Ancone Airport (IATA: XMK, ICAO: LFLQ)
Located: 44°34′47″N 004°44′18″E
Opened: 3 September – 20 November 1944
Constructed by MTO (12AF) Engineers
Runway: 6000x150 SOD (17/35)
Use: Emergency landing/refueling airfield

- Y-22 Crest, France

Located: 44°43′45″N 005°01′22″E
Opened: 29 August – 20 November 1944
Constructed by MTO (12AF) Engineers
Runway: 5000x150 SOD (01/19)
Use: Supply and Evacuation Airfield

- Y-23 Valence, France

Located: 44°55′18″N 004°58′11″E
Now: Valence-Chabeuil Airport (IATA: VAF, ICAO: LFLU)
Opened: 2 September 1944 Closed: 20 November 1944
Constructed by MTO (12AF) Engineers
Runway: 5500x150, SOD, (01/19)
Used by:

79th Fighter Group, September 1944 (P-47) (12th AF)

- Y-24 Satolas, France

Now: Lyon-Saint Exupéry Airport (IATA: LYS, ICAO: LFLL)
Located: 45°43′32″N 005°04′52″E
Opened: 7 September – 20 November 1944
Runway: 4000x150 SOD (17/35)
Use:

111th Tactical Reconnaissance Squadron, September 1944

- Y-25 Lyon/Loyettes, France

Located: 45°47′16″N 005°12′49″E
Opened: Closed: 20 November 1944
Constructed by MTO (12AF) Engineers
Runway: 6000x150, SOD, (02/20)
Used by:

27th Fighter Bomber Group, 11 September – October 1944 (P-47) (12th AF)

- Y-26 Lons-le-Saunier, France

Now: Lons-le-Saunier Airport
Located: 46°40′30″N 005°28′07″E
Opened: 12 September – 20 November 1944
Runway: 3000/150 SOD (08/26)
Use:

72d Liaison Squadron, September 1944

- Y-27 Besancon/Thise, France

Now: Besancon-Thiese Airport
Located: 47°16′29″N 006°05′00″E
Opened: 13 September – 20 November 1944
Runway: 3500/150 SOD (06/27)
Use: Supply and Evacuation Airfield

=== French Noncombat Support ALGs ===
- Y-30 Le Havre/Octeville, France

Now: Le Havre – Octeville Airport (IATA: LEH, ICAO: LFSH)
Located: 49°32′02″N 000°05′17″E
Opened: 2 November 1944 – 15 December 1945
Runway 1: 3500x125 PSP (05/23)
Runway 2: 3300x120 PSP (10/28)
Use: Used by United States Navy (Transport Airfield)

- Y-36 Cognac, France

Now: BA 709 Cognac – Châteaubernard Air Base
Located: 45°39′30″N 000°18′48″W
Opened: 6 December 1944 – 11 July 1945
Runway 1: 5200x260 CON (09/27)
Runway 2: 4200x260 CON (05/23)
Use: Emergency Refuelling/Landing Airfield

- Y-37 Bordeaux/Mérignac, France

Now: BA 106 Bordeaux-Mérignac Air Base
Located: 44°49′42″N 000°42′56″W
Opened: 6 December 1944 – 11 July 1945
Runway 1: 6560x180 CON (04/22)
Runway 2: 5412x180 CON (10/28)
Use: Transport Airfield/Tactical Air Depot

- Y-38 Toulouse/Blagnac, France

Now: Toulouse-Blagnac Airport (IATA: TLS, ICAO: LFBO)
Located: 43°38′06″N 001°22′04″E
Opened: 6 December 1944 – 11 July 1945
Runway: 6000x125 CON (14/32)
Use: Transport Airfield/Tactical Air Depot

- Y-40 Strasbourg/Entzheim, France

Now: Strasbourg Airport (IATA: SXB, ICAO: LFST)
Located: 48°32′31″N 007°38′04″E
Opened: 6 April – 11 November 1945
Runway: 5000x120 PSP (07/25)
Use: Emergency Landing/Refueling Field

- Y-45 Condé-sur-Marne, France

Located: 49°02′42″N 004°10′41″E (approximately)
Opened: 24 January – 5 November 1945
Runway 1: 4000x120 SOD (06/24)
Runway 2: 4000x120 SOD (10/28)
Use: Transport Airfield

- Y-48 Auxerre, France

Located: 47°48′00″N 003°34′06″E (approximately)
Opened: 3 February – 18 April 1945
Runway: 3300/120 SOD
Use: Transport Airfield

- Y-49 Bourges, France

Now: Bourges Airport (IATA: BOU, ICAO: LFLD)
Located: 47°03′39″N 002°22′12″E (approximately)
Opened: 3 February – 18 April 1945
Runway: 3800/193 CON (06/24)
Use: Transport Airfield

- Y-50 Avord, France

Now: BA 702 Avord Air Base
Located: 47°03′12″N 002°37′57″E
Opened: 3 February – 29 May 1945
Runway 1: 5240x262 CON
Runway 2: 5270x262 CON
Use: Transport Airfield

- Y-52 Nice, France

Located: 43°39′56″N 007°12′53″E
Opened: 17 February – 30 May 1945
Runway: 4500x150 ETH (05/23)
Use: Fighter/Bomber Emergency Landing Airfield
Now: Aéroport de Nice-Côte d'Azur

- Y-53 Colmar, France

Now: Colmar Airport (IATA: CMR, ICAO: LFGA)
Located: 48°06′37″N 007°21′33″E
Opened: 26 March – 11 November 1945
Runway: 5000x120 PSP (01/19)
Use: Fighter/Bomber Emergency Landing Airfield

- R-51 Cazaux/Bordeaux, France

Now: BA 120 Cazaux Air Base
Located: 44°32′01″N 001°07′32″W
Opened: 21 April – 1 August 1945
Runway:
Use: Transport Airfield

=== Benelux Liberation ===
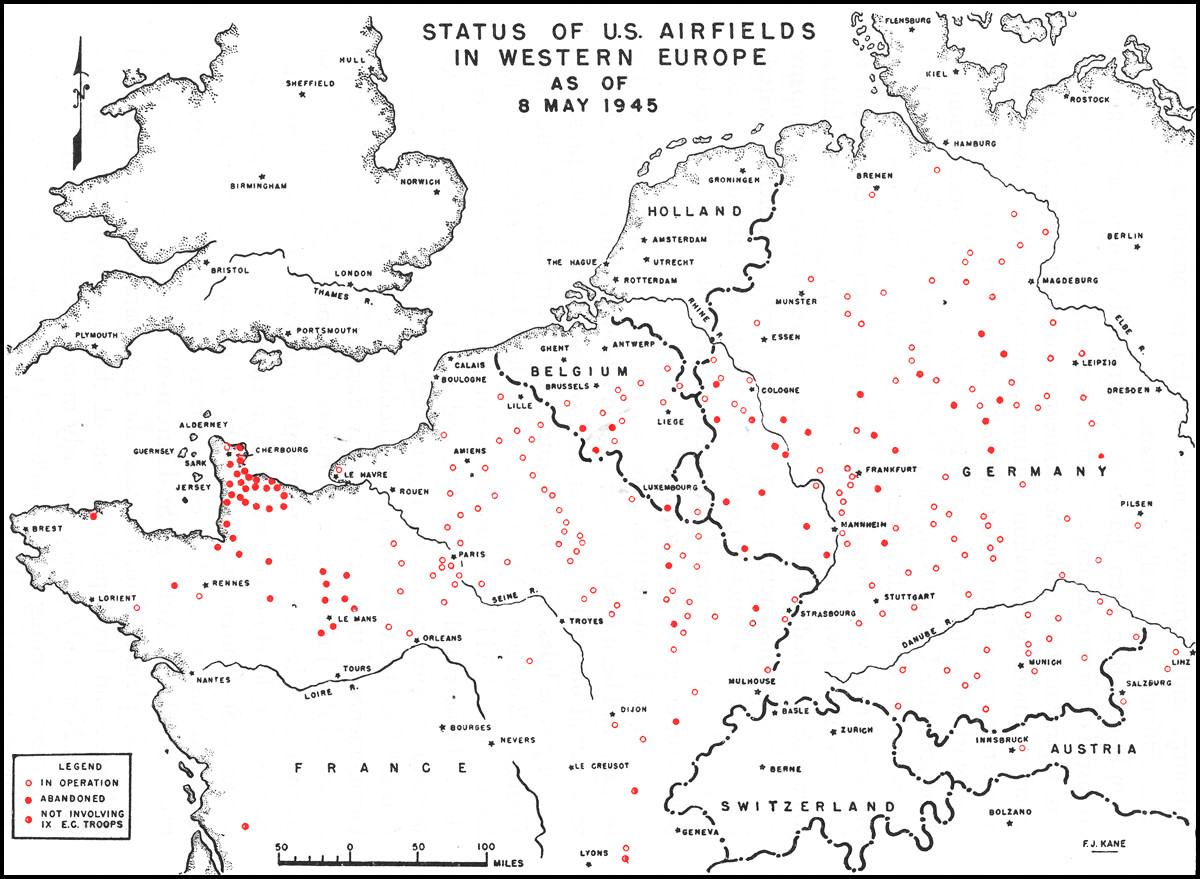
U.S. Airfields in Europe as of 8 May 1945

- A-78 Florennes/Juzaine, Belgium

Located: 50°14′37″N 004°38′55″E
Now: Florennes Air Base
Captured: 11 September
Opened: 11 September 1944 Closed: Unknown
Runway 1: 4343x164, CON (16/34)
Runway 2: 5509x164, CON/PSP (17/35)
Used by:

422d Night Fighter Squadron, 18 September 1944 – 6 April 1945 (P-61)
370th Fighter Group, 26 September 1944 – 27 January 1945 (P-38)
474th Fighter Group, 1 October 1944 – 22 March 1945 (P-38)
344th Bombardment Group, 5 April – 15 September 1945 (B-26)

- A-84 Chievres, Belgium (AAF-181)

Located: 50°34′33″N 3°49′51″E
Now: Chièvres Air Base
Captured: 13 September Opened: 16 September 1944 Closed: 15 May 1945
Runway 1: 5516x165, CON, (02/20)
Runway 2: 5902x165, CON, (09/27)
Used by:

368th Fighter Group, 2 October – 27 December 1944 (P-47)
365th Fighter Group, 4 October – 27 December 1944 (P-47)
352d Fighter Group, 27 January – 14 April 1945 (P-51) (8th AF)
361st Fighter Group, 1 February – April 1945 (P-47) (8th AF)

- A-85 Senzeilles, Belgium

Located: 50°10′38″N 004°27′51″E
Opened: 9 September 1944 – 13 February 1945
Runway: 3600x150 SOD (12/30)
Use: Transport Airfield

- A-86 Vitrival, Belgium

Located: 50°24′00″N 004°39′00″E
Opened: 11 September 1944 – 13 February 1945
Runway: 3600x150 SOD (04/22)
Use: Transport Airfield

- A-87 Charleroi, Belgium (AAF-184)

Located: 50°27′36″N 004°27′10″E
Now: Brussels South Charleroi Airport (IATA: CRL, ICAO: EBCI)
Opened: 14 September 1944 Closed: 10 August 1945
Runway: 3600x100, PSP, (06/24)
Used by:

67th Tactical Reconnaissance Group, September 1944 – March 1945 (P-38/F-4; P-51/F-5)

- A-89 Le Culot, Belgium

Also known as: B-68 (Royal Air Force)
Located: 50°45′20″N 004°46′04″E
Now: Beauvechain Air Base (ICAO: EBBE)
Captured: Opened: 28 October 1944 Closed: Undetermined
Runway 1: 5793x165, TAR/PSP, (04/22)
Runway 2: 4955x165, TAR, (12/30)
Used by:

373d Fighter Group, 22 October 1944 – 11 March 1945 (P-47)
36th Fighter Group, 27 October 1944 – 26 March 1945 (P-47)
322d Bombardment Group, March–June 1946 (B-26)

- A-92 Sint-Truiden (Saint Trond), Belgium

Also known as: B-62 (Royal Air Force)
Located: 50°47′23″N 005°11′48″E
Now: Sint-Truiden Air Base
Captured 16 September 1944
Opened: 18 September 1944 Closed: Undetermined
Runway 1: 5250x165, CON (14/32)
Runway 2: 4740x165, CON (09/27)
Runway 3: 5070x165, CON (06/24)
Used by:

48th Fighter Group, 30 September 1944 – 26 March 1945 (A-20)
404th Fighter Group, 4 October 1944 – 30 March 1945 (P-37)
386th Bombardment Group, 9 April – 27 July 1945 (B-26)

- A-93 Liege/Bierset, Belgium

Located: 50°38′18″N 005°26′18″E
Opened: 17 November 1944 – 8 August 1945
Runway: 4000x120 PSP (08/26)
Use: Detachment, 153d Liaison Squadron

- A-97 Sandweiler, Luxembourg

Located: 49°37′24″N 006°12′16″E
Now: Luxembourg - Findel Airport (IATA: LUX, ICAO: ELLX)
Opened: 18 September 1944 Closed: 15 August 1945
Runway: 3400x132, SOD, (06/24)
Used by:

363d Tactical Reconnaissance Group, 4–29 October 1944 (P-38/F-4; P-51/F-5)

- Y-10 Le Culot/East, Belgium

Located: 50°46′54″N 004°57′28″E
Now: Goetsenhoven Military Airfield (ICAO: EBTN)
Captured: September 1944 Opened: September 1944 Closed: 25 June 1945
Runway: 3600/120, PSP, (04/22)
Used by:

371st Fighter Group, 1 October – 20 December 1944

- Y-29 Asch, Belgium

Located: 50°57′55″N 005°35′02″E
Now: Zutendaal Air Base
Opened: 20 November 1944 Closed: 20 June 1945
Runway: 5000x150, SOD, (06/24)
Used by:

366th Fighter Group, 19 November 1944 – 11 April 1945 (P-47)
406th Fighter Group, 8 February – 15 April 1945 (P-47)
391st Bombardment Group, 16 April – 27 May 1945 (B-26)

- Y-32 Ophoven, Belgium

Located: 51°08′08″N 005°47′00″E (abandoned)
Opened: 10 December 1944 Closed: 29 May 1945
Runway: 5000x150, PSP, (12/30)
Used by:

370th Fighter Group, 27 January – 20 April 1945 (P-47)
405th Fighter Group, 30 February – April 1945 (P-47)

- Y-41 Virton, Belgium

Located: 49°34′08″N 005°31′57″E (approximately)
Opened: 26 December 1944 – 3 May 1945
Runway: 3000x80 CINDER (10/28)
Use: Liaison and emergency landing airfield

- Y-44 Maastricht, Netherlands

Located: 50°54′57″N 005°46′37″E
Now: Maastricht Aachen Airport (IATA: MST, ICAO: EHBK)
Opened: 23 March 1945 Closed: 1 August 1945
Runway: 5565x120, PSP, (04/22)
Used by:

387th Bombardment Group, 29 April – 24 May 1945 (B-26)

- Y-47 Namur, Belgium

Located: 50°27′14″N 004°52′23″E (approximately)
Opened: 22 February – 30 November 1945
Runway: 3450/90 PSP/SMT (07/25)
Use:

9th Bombardment Division, – 20 April November 1945
99th Bombardment Wing, 1 July – August 1945
98th Bombardment Wing, October – November 1945
112th Liaison Squadron, 26 October 1944 – 11 February 1945

Transferred to Royal Air Force control, 30 November 1945

- Y-55 Venlo, Netherlands

Located: 51°22′07″N 006°12′44″E
Fliegerhorst Venlo-Herongen astride the Dutch-German border. Now: German Bundeswehr Depot Herongen, before: US-Army POMCUS Depot Herongen supporting NORTHAG (Germany)
Opened: 12 March 1945 Closed: 14 August 1945
Runway 1: 4200x300, BRK, (08/26)
Runway 2: 5500x300, PSP/BRK, (12/30)
Used by:

363d Tactical Reconnaissance Group, 15 March – April 1945 (P-38/F-4; P-51/F-5)
373d Fighter Group, 11 March – 20 April 1945 (P-47)
397th Bombardment Group, 25 April – 24 May 1945 (B-26)
394th Bombardment Group, 2 May – September 1945 (B-26)

=== Western Allied invasion of Germany ===
Airfields captured or established to support combat operations during the Western Allied Invasion of Germany (1 February – 8 May 1945). This section lists those used during the war; ones used during the occupation period of Germany are listed in the Army of Occupation ALGs section.

==== Rhineland Campaign ====
- Y-43 Duren, Germany

Construction cancelled

- Y-46 Aachen, Germany

Located: 50°49′23.75″N 006°11′11.01″E
Now: Merzbruck Airport (ICAO: EDKA)
Opened: 14 March 1945 Closed: 11 May 1945
Runway: 5000x120, PSP, (05/23)
Used by:

365th Fighter Group, 16 March – 13 April 1945 (P-47)
36th Fighter Group, 26 March – 8 April 1945 (P-47)

- Y-51 Vogelsang, Germany

Located: 50°33′49″N 006°26′00″E (abandoned)
Opened: 23 March 1945 Closed: 10 July 1945
Runway: 3600x120, PSP/PAP, (15/33)
Used by:

67th Tactical Reconnaissance Group, 2 March – April 1945 (P-38/F-4; P-51/F-5)

- Y-54 Kelz, Germany

Located: 50°46′03″N 006°35′48″E (abandoned)
Opened: 24 March 1945 Closed: 11 July 1945
Runway: 5000x120, PSP, (09/27)
Used by:

48th Fighter Group, 26 March – 17 April 1945 (P-47)
404th Fighter Group, 30 March – 12 April 1945 (P-47)

- Y-56 Moenchen Gladbach, Germany

Now: Park, industrial area (Mönchengladbach)
Located: 51°10′51″N 006°23′37″E
Opened: 30 March– 30 September 1945
Runway: 3600x120 PSP (07/25)
Use:
125th Liaison Squadron, March – April 1945
Closed: 30 September 1945, turned over to Royal Air Force as part of British Zone of Occupation.

- Y-58 Cologne, Germany

Now: Cologne Butzweilerhof Airport
Located: unknown
Opened: 8 March – 18 June 1945
Runway: 3000x100 SOD (01/19)
Use: Resupply and Evacuation Airfield

- Y-59 Strassfeld, Germany

Located: 50°41′43″N 006°53′21″E (abandoned)
Opened: 29 March 1945 Closed: 17 May 1945
Runway: 5000x120, PSP/CON, (07/25)
Used by:

474th Fighter Group, 22 March – 22 April 1945 (P-38)
414th Night Fighter Squadron (DET), 3–23 April 1945 (P-61) (12th AF)
422d Night Fighter Squadron, 6–24 April 1945 (P-61)

- Y-60 Dunstekoven, Germany

Located: 50°42′00″N 006°56′00″E (approximately)
Opened: 12 March – 11 May 1945
Runway: 3150x120 SOD (02/20)
Use: Supply and Evacuation Airfield

- Y-61 Krefeld,, Germany

Located: 51°20′00″N 006°34′00″E
Opened: 28 March – 15 June 1945
Runway: 3600x120 PSP, (14/32)
Use: Fighter/Bomber Airfield; Tactical Air Depot

- Y-62 Mendig (Niedermendig), Germany

Located: 50°21′57″N 007°18′55″E
Now: Mendig airfield (ICAO: EDRE)
Opened: 17 March 1945 Closed: 11 May 1945
Runway: 5000x120, PSP/CON, (07/25)
Used by:

36th Fighter Group, 26 March – 8 April 1945 (P-47)

- Y-63 Koblenz, Germany

Located: 50°20′35″N 007°34′02″E
Now: built-up area
Opened: 30 March – 11 May 1945
Runway: 3000x120 SOD (07/25)
Use: Supply and Evacuation/ Emergency Landing Airfield

- Y-64 Ober-Olm, Germany

Located: 49°58′08″N 008°08′47″E
Now: Mainz Finthen Airport (ICAO: EDFZ)
Opened: 27 March 1945 Closed: 20 June 1945
Runway 1: 4000x120, SOD, (07/25)
Runway 2: 5000x120, SMT, (08/26)
Used by:

10th Reconnaissance Group, 4 March – April 1945 (P-38/F-4; P-51/F-5)
354th Fighter Group, 8–30 April 1945 (P-47)

- Y-65 Chantilly, France

Located: 49°11′35″N 002°27′55″E
Opened: 22 December 1944 – 8 August 1945
Runway 1: 2200x150 SOD (07/25)
Runway 2: 2150x150 SOD (00/18)
Use: Liaison Airfield

- Y-66 Gollheim, Germany

Located: 49°35′19″N 008°01′44″E
Opened: 25 March – 30 April 1945
Runway: 3600x120 SOD (06/24)
Use: Supply and Evacuation Airfield

- Y-70 Maitzborn, Germany

Located: 49°56′18″N 007°25′35″E
Opened: 30 March – 30 April 1945
Runway: 3600x120 SOD
Use: Supply and Evacuation Airfield

==== Central Europe Campaign ====
- Y-67 Gelnhausen, Germany

Now: Agricultural, housing and industrial area
Located: 50°11′53″N 009°07′37″E
Opened: 1–30 April 1945
Runway: 3600x120 SOD (10/28)
Use: Supply and Evacuation Airfield

- Y-68 Lachen/Speyerdorf, Germany

Construction Cancelled

- Y-69 Mittelbrunn, Germany

Located: 49°22′00″N 007°33′00″E (approximately)
Opened: 26 March – 3 May 1945
Runway: 2000x150 SOD (03/21)
Use: Liaison Airfield

- Y-71 Eudenbach, Germany

Now: Glider airfield Eudenbach
Located: 50°40′17″N 007°21′43″E
Opened: 26 March – 30 April 1945
Runway: 3400x130 SOD (06/24)
Use: Supply and Evacuation Airfield

- Y-72 Braunshardt, Germany

Located: 49°54′36″N 08°32′30″E
Captured: March 1945; Opened: 27 March 1945
Runway: 5571/150, Soil, Cement & PSP, (07/25)
Used by:

415th Night Fighter Squadron, 17 April – 2 October 1945 (P-61)
86th Fighter Group, 17 April – 26 September 1945 (P-47) (12th AF)
417th Night Fighter Squadron, 26 June – 8 August 1945 (P-61)

Closed: 30 October 1945, Now: agricultural use

- Y-74 Frankfurt/Eschborn, Germany

Located: 50°07′57″N 008°33′09″E (abandoned)
Opened: 31 March 1945 Closed: July 1945
Runway: 5200/120, PSP, (12/30)
Used by:

371st Fighter Group, 7 April – 5 May 1945 (P-47)
367th Fighter Group, 20 April – July 1945 (P-47)
US Army, July 1945 – 1992

- Y-75 Frankfurt/Rebstock, Germany

Located: 50°06′41″N 008°36′47″E (approximately)
Opened: 15 April – 30 May 1945
Runway: 3600x120 SOD (08/26)
Use: Liaison Airfield

- Y-77 Babenhausen, Germany

Now: Former Flugplatz Babenhausen, closed 2019
Located: 49°57′11″N 008°58′11″E
Opened: 31 March – 30 April 1945
Runway: 3600x120 SOD (02/20)
Use: Supply and Evacuation Airfield

- Y-78 Biblis, Germany

Located: 49°41′15″N 008°27′07″E (abandoned)
Opened: 2 April 1945 Closed: July 1945
Runway: 5000/120, SOD/SMT, (11/29)
Used by:

27th Fighter Bomber Group, 24 April – June 1945 (A-36) (12th AF)

- Y-79 Mannheim/Sandhofen, Germany

Now: Coleman Army Airfield (ICAO: ETOR)
Located: 49°33′47″N 008°27′46″E
Opened: 4 April 1945
Runway 1: 5200/120, PSP, (05/23)
Runway 2: 5200/120, SMT, (05/23)
Used by:

358th Fighter Group, 2 April – 23 June 1945 (P-47)

- Y-81 Ailertchen, Germany

Now: Flugplatz Ailertchen
Located: 50°35′36″N 007°56′42″E
Opened: 30 March – 30 April 1945
Runway: 3700x120 SOD (05/23)
Use: Supply and Evacuation Airfield

- Y-82 Kirchhellen, Germany

Was: Fliegerhorst Kirchhellen
Now: Flugplatz Schwarze Heide (IATA: ZCV, ICAO: EDLD)
Located: 51°36′57″N 006°51′38″E
Opened: 30 March – 5 July 1945
Runway 1: 3600x120 SOD (05/23)
Runway 2: 3600x120 SOD (05/23)
Use: Supply and Evacuation Airfield

- Y-83 Limburg (Limburg an der Lahn), Germany

Located: 50°24′50″N 008°04′16″E (abandoned)
Opened: 3 April 1945 Closed: June 1945
Runway: 3600/120, SOD, (08/26)
Used by:

67th Tactical Reconnaissance Group, 2–10 April 1945 (P-38/F-4; P-51/F-5)

- Y-85 Ettinghausen, Germany

Located: 50°31′06″N 007°52′49″E (approximately)
Opened: 31 March 1945 – 30 April 1945
Runway: 3450x120 SOD (04/22)
Use: Supply and Evacuation Airfield

- Y-87 Nidda, Germany

Now: Agricultural, housing and industrial area
Located: 50°26′17″N 008°59′27″E
Opened: 1 April – 15 May 1945
Runway: 3600x120 SOD (14/32)
Use: Supply and Evacuation Airfield

- Y-88 Wertheim am Main, Germany

Later: Wertheim AAF
Now: Industrial & housing area
Located: 49°45′40″N 009°29′26″E
Opened: 2 April – 15 May 1945
Runway: 3800x120 SOD (05/23)
Use: Supply and Evacuation Airfield

- Y-89 Mannheim/Stadt, Germany

Now: Mannheim City Airport (IATA: MHG, ICAO: EDFM)
Located: 49°28′21″N 008°30′51″E
Opened: 10 April – 8 August 1945
Runway 1: 2950x120 SOD (14/32)
Runway 2: 2850x120 SOD (05/23)
Use: Liaison Airfield

- Y-92 Dörnberg, Germany

Now: Glider airfield
Located: 51°21′59″N 009°20′12″E
Opened: 2–30 April 1945
Runway: 3000x120 SOD (09/27)
Use: Supply and Evacuation Airfield

- Y-93 Munster, Germany

Construction cancelled

- Y-94 Munster/Handorf, Germany

Located: 51°59′18″N 007°43′55″E (abandoned)
Opened: 12 April 1945 Closed: June 1945
Runway: 5019/120, TAR, (08/26)
Used by:

366th Fighter Group, 11 April – 25 June 1945 (P-47)
406th Fighter Group, 15 April – 5 June 1945 (P-47)

- Y-95 Bracht, Germany

Located: 50°54′50″N 008°52′41″E
Opened: 5–30 April 1945
Runway: 3400x120 SOD (00/18)
Use: Supply and Evacuation Airfield

- Y-97 Paderborn, Germany

Located: 51°41′26″N 008°44′10″E (approximately)
Opened: 7 April – 2 June 1945
Runway: 3600x120 SOD (06/24)
Use: Supply and Evacuation Airfield

- Y-98 Lippstadt, Germany

Located: 51°42′48″N 008°22′06″E
Captured: 7 April 1945 Closed: 12 July 1945
Runway: 4750/120, SMT/PSP, (08/26)
Used by:

373d Fighter Group, 20 April – 20 May 1945 (P-47)

- Y-99 Gütersloh, Germany

Now: Princess Royal Barracks (British Army) (IATA: GUT, ICAO: EUTO)
Located: 51°55′22.20″N 008°18′22.80″E
Captured: 4 April 1945 Opened: 6 April 1945 Closed: 22 June 1945
Runway: 4040/120, SMT, (08/26)
Used by:

363d Tactical Reconnaissance Group, 15–22 April 1945 (P-38/F-4; P-51/F-5)
370th Fighter Group, 20 April – 27 June 1945 (P-38)

- R-1 Wenigenlupnitz, Germany

Now: Eisenach-Kindel Airport
Located: 50°59′30″N 010°28′49″E
Opened: 8–30 April 1945
Runway: 3400x120 SOD (10/28)
Use: Supply and Evacuation airfield

- R-2 Langensalza, Germany

Now: Bad Langensalza Airport (ICAO: EDEB)
Located: 51°07′46″N 010°37′18″E
Captured 8 April 1945 : Opened: 8 April 1945 Closed: 5 July 1945
Runway: 4921/120, SOD/TAR, (08/26)
Used by:

474th Fighter Group, 22 April – 16 June 1945 (P-38)
422d Night Fighter Squadron, 24 April – 25 May 1945 (P-61)

- R-3 Röhrensee, Germany

Later: Röhrensee Kaserne
Located: 49°57′31″N 011°35′01″E
Opened: 12–30 April 1945
Runway: 3600x120 SOD (11/29)
Use: Supply and Evacuation airfield

Transferred to United States Army

- R-4 Gotha/North, Germany

Located: 50°58′13″N 010°43′32″E
Opened: 11 April – 5 May 1945
Runway: 3600x120 SOD/CON (10/28)
Use: Supply and Evacuation airfield

- R-5 Crailsheim, Germany

Located: 49°08′07″N 010°04′14″E
Opened: 24 April – 30 May 1945
Runway: 3600x120 SOD (08/26)
Use: Supply and Evacuation airfield

- R-7 Weimar, Germany

Located: 50°58′35″N 011°14′48″E
Opened: 14 April – 30 June 1945
Runway: 3300x120 SOD (09/27)
Use:

IX Fighter Command, April – July 1945
IX Tactical Air Command, 26 April – 26 June 1945
125th Liaison Squadron, 9 March – 4 April 1945
Closed 30 June 1945, turned over to Soviet Union as part of Soviet Zone of Occupation.

- R-8 Eisfeld, Germany

Located: 50°25′05″N 010°55′02″E
Opened: 13–30 April 1045
Runway: 3000x120 SOD (06/24)
Use: Supply and Evacuation airfield

- R-9 Erfurt/Bindersleben, Germany

Now: Erfurt-Weimar Airport
Located: 50°58′45″N 010°37′34″E
Opened: 14–30 April 1945
Runway: 4300/120 SOD/CON (09/27)
Use: 15th Tactical Reconnaissance Squadron, April 1945

- R-11 Eschwege, Germany

Located: 51°11′55″N 010°01′27″E (abandoned)
Captured 6 April 1945 Opened: 7 April 1945 Closed: Undetermined
Runway: 3500/120, SOD, (12/30)
Used by:

67th Tactical Reconnaissance Group, 10 April – July 1945

- R-12 Kassel/Rothwesten, Germany

Located: 51°23′25″N 009°32′03″E (abandoned)
Opened: 7 April 1945 Closed: Undetermined
Runway: 5000/120, PSP, (13/31)
Used by:

48th Fighter Group, 17–29 April 1945
36th Fighter Group, 21 April – 15 November 1945

- R-13 Hessich/Lichtenau, Germany

Now Flugplatz Hessisch-Lichtenau
Located: 51°11′20″N 009°44′34″E
Opened: 8 April – 22 June 1945
Runway: 3600x120 SOD (09/27)
Use: Supply and Evacuation airfield, Storage field

- R-15 Oschersleben, Germany

Now: Flugplatz Oschersleben
Located: 52°02′18″N 011°12′14″E
Opened: 12 April – 1 October 1945
Runway: 3100x150 CON (10/28)
Use: Supply and Evacuation airfield

- R-16 Hildesheim, Germany

Now: Flugplatz Hildesheim-Drispenstedt
Located: 52°10′48″N 009°56′44″E
Opened: 12 April – 5 June 1945
Runway: 5000x120 SOD (08/26)
Use: Supply and Evacuation airfield

- R-17 Göttingen, Germany

Was: Flughaven Göttinger (closed 1945)
Located: 51°32′10″N 009°54′15″E
Opened: 14 April – 12 July 1945
Runway: 3600x120 SOD
Use: Supply and Evacuation airfield

- R-18 Kölleda, Germany

Now: Flugplatz Sömmerda-Dermsdorf
Located: 51°11′54″N 011°11′30″E
Opened: 14–30 April 1945
Runway: 3600x120 SOD (07/25)
Use: Supply and Evacuation airfield

- R-19 Nordhausen, Germany

Now: Flugplatz Nordhausen
Located: 51°29′37″N 010°50′08″E
Opened: 14–30 April 1945
Runway: 3600x120 SOD
Use: Supply and Evacuation airfield

- R-20 Esperstedt, Germany

Located: 51°20′19″N 011°11′16″E
Opened: 4–30 April 1945
Runway: 3600x120 SOD
Use: Supply and Evacuation airfield

- R-21 Rochau, Germany

Located: 52°42′27″N 011°44′36″E (approximately)
Opened: 15 April – 15 May 1945
Runway: 3600x120 SOD (07/25)
Use: Supply and Evacuation airfield

- R-22 Rodigen, Germany

Located: 50°58′49″N 011°36′02″E (approximately)
Opened: 16 April – 16 June 1945
Runway: 2300x120 SOD (06/24)
Use: Supply and Evacuation airfield

- R-23 Leipzig–Altenburg Airport, Germany

Now: Altenburg-Nobitz Airport
Located: 50°58′55″N 012°30′23″E
Opened: 16 April – 7 July 1945
Runway: 4200x120 SOD (01/19)
Use: Supply and Evacuation airfield

- R-27 Sachsenheim, Germany

Located: 48°56′55″N 009°02′36″E
Opened: 24 April – 30 May 1945
Runway: 4500x120 MACADM (09/27)
Use: Emergency fighter/bomber airfield

- R-28 Fürth-Atzenhof, Germany

Located: 49°29′49″N 010°57′26″E (abandoned)
Opened: 19 April 1945 Closed: Undetermined
Runway: 4500/120, PSP, (09/27)
Used by:

10th Reconnaissance Group,
362d Fighter Group, 30 April – 3 May 1945

- R-30 Fürth/Industriehafen, Germany

Located: 49°28′58″N 010°57′01″E
Opened: 22 April – 30 August 1945
Runway: 5000x172 PSP/CON (11/29)
Use:

362d Fighter Group, 30 April – 3 May 1945
425th Night Fighter Squadron, 2 May – 5 July 1945
371st Fighter Group, 5 May – 16 August 1945

- R-31 Merseburg, Germany

Now: Merseburg Airfield
Located: 51°21′48″N 011°56′54″E
Opened: 16 April – 5 May 1945
Runway: 3369x170 SOD (06/24)
Use: Supply and Evacuation Airfield

- R-32 Köthen, Germany

Now: Köthen Airfield
Located: 51°43′16″N 011°57′23″E
Opened: 18 April – 5 May 1945
Runway: 3300x120 SOD (07/25)
Use: Supply and Evacuation Airfield

- R-33 Gardelegen, Germany

Now: Industrial area
Located: 52°32′10″N 011°26′27″E
Opened: 15 April – 15 June 1945
Runway: 3600x120 SOD (09/27)
Use: Supply and Evacuation Airfield

- R-34 Stendal, Germany

Now: Stendal-Borstel Airfield (ICAO: EDOV)
Located: 52°37′58″N 011°49′54″E
Opened: 17 April – 15 June 1945
Runway: 4300x120 SOD (08/26)
Use: Supply and Evacuation Airfield

- R-35 Völkenrode, Germany

Now: Physikalisch-Technische Bundesanstalt (Federal research agency)
Located: 52°18′17″N 010°26′33″E
Opened: 18 April – 15 May 1945
Runway: 3600x120 SOD (12/30)
Use:

125th Liaison Squadron, April 1945

- R-36 Wesendorf, Germany

Was: Wesendorf Airfield (Closed 2006)
Now: Industrial area (partially)
Located: 52°34′38″N 010°30′43″E
Opened: 13 April – 5 June 1945
Runway: 3600x120 SOD (12/30)
Use: Supply and Evacuation Airfield

- R-37 Brunswick/Waggum, Germany

Now: Braunschweig Airport (IATA: BWE, ICAO: EDVE)
Located: 52°19′09″N 10°33′19″E
Captured: 20 April 1945 Opened: 22 April 1945 Closed: Undetermined
Runway: 3600/120, SOD, (08/26)
Used by:

363d Tactical Reconnaissance Group, 22 April – May 1945

- R-38 Brunswick/Broitzem, Germany 52°14′58″N 010°29′21″E

Headquarters: 84th Fighter Wing, 22 April – 12 August 1945
153d Liaison Squadron, 20 May – 4 June 1945
Closed: 31 August 1945, turned over to Royal Air Force as part of British Zone of Occupation.

- R-39 Helmstedt, Germany

Located: 52°13′42″N 011°00′37″E (approximately)
Opened: 24 April – 5 July 1945
Runway: 3600x120 SOD (04/22)
Use: Supply and Evacuation Airfield

- R-41 Schwäbisch Hall, Germany

Now: Flugplatz Schwäbisch Hall-Hessental
Located: 49°07′07″N 009°46′54″E
Opened: 22 April – 31 August 1945
Runway: 3600x120 CON 08/26
Use: Supply and Evacuation Airfield

- R-43 Nuremberg, Germany

Now: Recreational park, fair and exhibition area
Located: 49°25′25″N 011°07′04″E
Opened: 24 April – 31 August 1945
Runway: 3600x120 SOD 10/28
Use: Supply and Evacuation Airfield

- R-44 Göppingen, Germany

Later: Göppingen AAF until 1992
Now: Industrial area Stauferpark
Located: 48°42′29″N 009°41′28″E
Opened: 25 April – 15 June 1945
Runway: 3000x120 SOD 06/24
Use: Supply and Evacuation Airfield

- R-46 Roth, Germany

Now: Roth Air Base
Located: 49°13′05″N 011°06′01″E
Opened: 25 April – 31 August 1945
Runway: 5200x120 PSP 09/27
Use: Supply and Evacuation Airfield

- R-47 Oettingen, Germany

Located: 48°55′31″N 010°32′05″E
Opened: 26 April – 15 May 1945
Runway: 3115x267 MACADAM 05/23
Use: Supply and Evacuation Airfield

- R-48 Ingolstadt, Germany

Now: Ingolstadt Manching Airport
Located: 48°42′56″N 011°32′02″E
Opened: 29 April – 15 May 1945
Runway: 3300x120 SOD 09/27
Use: Supply and Evacuation Airfield

- R-49 Hailfingen, Germany

Located: 48°32′19″N 008°51′39″E
Opened: 30 April – 11 July 1945
Runway 1: 4000x120 SOD 07/25
Runway 2: 3600x120 SOD 07/25
Use: Fighter/Bomber Airfield

- R-52 Leipzig/Mockau, Germany

Later: Flughafen Leipzig-Mockau until 1991
Now: Industrial area
Located: 51°23′44″N 012°24′35″E
Opened: 27 April – 15 June 1945
Runway: 3600x120 SOD
Use: Supply and Evacuation Airfield

- R-53 Zwickau, Germany

Now: Zwickau airfield (ICAO: EDBI)
Located: 50°42′05″N 012°27′11″E
Opened: 4 May – 15 June 1945
Runway: 2870x120 SOD (07/25)
Use: Supply and Evacuation Airfield

- R-55 Salzwedel, Germany

Located: 52°50′06″N 011°12′23″E
Opened: 3 May – 5 July 1945
Runway: 3600x120 SOD (08/26)
Use: Supply and Evacuation Airfield

- R-58 Friedrichshafen, Germany

Now Friedrichshafen Airport (ICAO: EDNY, IATA: FDH)
Located: 47°40′17″N 009°30′41″E
Opened: 4 May – 1 August 1945
Runway: 2700x120 SOD
Use: Supply and Evacuation Airfield

- R-59 Leipheim, Germany

Construction cancelled

- R-60 Neuburg

Construction cancelled

- R-61 Eutingen

Now: Eutingen airfield (ICAO: EDTE)
Located: 48°29′09″N 008°46′42″E
Opened: 27 April – 1 August 1945
Runway: 3200x240 TAR (06/24)
Use: Supply and Evacuation Airfield

- R-62 Mengen

Now: Mengen-Hohentengen Airfield (ICAO: EDTM)
Located: 48°03′12″N 009°22′12″E
Opened: 25 April – 1 August 1945
Runway: 3600x120 SOD (06/24)
Use: Supply and Evacuation Airfield

- R-63 Weiden

Located: 49°38′30″N 012°07′31″E
Opened: 25 April – 15 June 1945
Runway: 3150x120 SOD (07/25)
Use: Supply and Evacuation Airfield

- R-64 Cham

Now: Cham-Janahof glider airfield
Located: 49°12′42″N 012°39′24″E
Opened: 27 April – 15 June 1945
Runway: 3150x120 SOD (10/28)
Use: Supply and Evacuation Airfield

- R-65 Risstissen

Located: 48°16′36″N 009°51′04″E
Opened: 27 April – 15 June 1945
Runway: 3000x120 SOD (07/25)
Use: Supply and Evacuation Airfield

- R-66 Regensburg/Prufening

Located: 49°00′42″N 012°02′56″E (approximately)
Opened: 28 April – 15 June 1945
Runway: 3200x120 SOD (07/25)
Use:
14th Liaison Squadron (May 1945)

- R-69 Landau

Now: Landau Ebenberg Airport
Located: 49°10′36″N 008°07′51″E
Opened: 1 May – 15 June 1945
Runway: 3600x120 SOD (07/25)
Use: Supply and Evacuation Airfield

- R-73 Ergolding, Germany

Located: 48°33′46″N 012°09′44″E (approximately)
Opened: 3 May – 15 June 1945
Runway: 3200x120 SOD (04/22)
Use: Supply & Evacuation Airfield

- R-75 Schleissheim Germany

Now: Flugplatz Schleißheim
Located: 48°14′21″N 011°33′38″E
Opened: 2 May 1945 – 31 August 1945
Runway: 5500x162 CON/PSP (07/25)
Use: Supply & Evacuation/Fighter Bomber Airfield

- R-76 Pocking, Germany

Now: Photovoltaic power plant
Located: 48°22′24″N 013°17′52″E
Opened: 3 May 1945
Runway: 3600x120 SOD (06/24)
Use: Supply & Evacuation Airfield

- R-79 Schongau, Germany

Located: 47°48′43″N 010°53′15″E (approximately)
Opened: 3 May – 8 August 1945
Runway: 3000x120 SOD (07/25)
Use: Supply & Evacuation Airfield

- R-80 Salzburg, Austria

Now: Salzburg Airport
Located: 47°47′39″N 013°00′11″E
Opened: 7 May 1945
Runway: 4000x120 CON (10/28)
Use: Supply and Evacuation airfield

- R-83 Mühldorf, Germany

Located: 48°15′39″N 012°27′28″E
Opened: 4 May – 15 June 1945
Runway: 3200x120 SOD (12/30)
Use: Supply and Evacuation airfield

- R-84 Augsburg, Germany

Now: Augsburg Airport
Located: 48°25′29″N 010°56′01″E
Opened: 3 May 1945
Runway: 3000x120 SOD (10/28)
Use:

72d Liaison Squadron (May–June 1945)

- R-86 Bad Aibling, Germany

Located: 47°51′52″N 012°00′34″E (approximately)
Opened: 4 May 1945
Runway: 3000x150 SOD (11/29)
Use: Supply and Evacuation airfield

- R-88 Innsbruck, Austria

Now: Innsbruck Airport
Located: 47°15′37″N 011°20′51″E
Opened: 5 May – 12 July 1945
Runway: 3000x120 SOD (08/26)
Use: Supply and Evacuation airfield

- R-89 Plzeň, Czechoslovakia

Now: Plzeň Airport
Located: 49°40′27″N 013°16′19″E
Opened: 8 May – 5 September 1945
Runway: 4000x260 SOD/CON (09/27)
Use: Supply and Evacuation airfield

- R-90 Wels, Austria

Now: Wels Airport
Located: 48°11′01″N 014°02′19″E
Opened: 7 May – 5 July 1945
Runway: 3600x120 SOD (08/26)
Use: Supply and Evacuation airfield

- R-93 Holzkirchen/Marschall, Germany

Located: 47°52′15″N 011°42′43″E (approximately)
Opened: 5 June 1945
Runway 1: 3625x120 SOD (08/26)
Runway 2: 3600x120 SOD (03/21)
Use: Military Storage Airfield

- R-94 Nellingen, Germany

Now: Segelfluggelände Oppingen-Au
Located: 48°33′26″N 009°49′04″E
Opened: 1 August 1945
Runway: 3500x225 SOD (14/32)
Use: Military Storage Airfield

- R-97 Regensburg/Obertraubling, Germany

Construction cancelled

=== Army of Occupation ALGs ===
ALGs used by American forces in Occupied Germany and Austria after the German surrender on 7 May 1945. Primarily used for storage of captured German weapons, aircraft and equipment before their destruction. Also for garrisons of US Army or US Army Air Force personnel.

- Y-57 Trier, Germany

Later AAF Station Trier; Trier Air Base
Now: industrial area
Located: 49.72304°N 6.60126°E
Opened: 10 March 1945
Runway: 3625x120, CON/PSP, (06/24)
Used by:

10th Reconnaissance Group, – 4 March April 1945 (P-38/F-4; P-51/F-5)

- Y-73 Frankfurt/Rhein-Main, Germany

Later: AAF Station Frankfurt; Rhein-Main Air Base
Now: Frankfurt Airport (IATA: FRA, ICAO: EDDF)
Located: 50°01′48.7″N 08°35′16.97″E
Captured: 30 March 1945 Opened: 10 April 1945
Runway: 6000/120, CON, (07/25)
Used by:

362d Fighter Group, 8–30 April 1945 (P-47)
425th Night Fighter Squadron, 12 April – 2 May 1945 (P-61)
368th Fighter Group, 15 April – 13 May 1945 (P-47)

Closed 10 October 2005

- Y-76 Darmstadt/Griesheim, Germany

Later: AAF Station Darmstadt/Griesheim
Transferred to United States Army, December 1945 (Darmstadt Army Airfield)
Now: Griesheim Airfield (IATA: ZCS, ICAO: EDES)
Located: 49°51′15″N 008°35′19″E
Opened: 31 March 1945
Runway: 3600x120 SOD (08/26)
Use:

72d Liaison Squadron, 1–15 April; June–July 1945
167th Liaison Squadron, 10 June – 2 July 1945
63d Fighter Wing, 17 July – 1 December 1945
64th Fighter Wing, 7 July – 1 December 1945
71st Fighter Wing, 25 September – November 1945
155th Photographic Reconnaissance Squadron, 28 September – 24 November 1945
160th Photographic Reconnaissance Squadron, 22 September – 24 November 1945

- Y-80 Wiesbaden, Germany

Later: AAF Station Wiesbaden; Wiesbaden Army Airfield
Transferred to United States Army, 31 December 1975 (Project Creek Swap)
Now: Wiesbaden Army Airfield
Located: 50°02′57″N 008°19′27″E
Captured 3 April 1945

47th Liaison Squadron, 2 May 1945 – 24 June 1946
United States Air Forces in Europe, 26 September 1945 – 15 August 1953
Twelfth Air Force, 1 January 1951 – 27 April 1953
51st Troop Carrier Wing, September 1945 – 5 January 1948
2d Air Division, 1–10 June 1949
3d Air Division, 25 October 1953 – 1 March 1954
322d Troop Carrier Wing, 1–22 March 1954
363d Reconnaissance Group, May–August 1945
60th Troop Carrier Group*, 15 December 1948 – 26 September 1949
317th Troop Carrier Group*, 30 September – 15 December 1948
* Assigned to 1st Airlift Task Force (Berlin Airlift)

- Y-84 Giessen, Germany

Later: AAF Station Giessen
Transferred to United States Army control Giessen Army Depot (Closed 2008)
Located: 50°35′47″N 008°43′41″E (approximately)
Opened: 30 March – 5 June 1945
Runway: 3300x120 SOD (09/27)
Use: Supply and Evacuation Airfield

- Y-86 Fritzlar, Germany

Later: AAF Station Fritzlar
Turned over to United States Army (Fritzlar Kaserne), 14 September 1947
Now: Fritzlar Air Base (IATA: FRZ, ICAO: ETHF)
Located: 51°07′00″N 009°17′14″E
Opened: 31 March 1945
Runway: 5000/120, PSP, (12/30)
Used by:

404th Fighter Group, 12 April – 23 June 1945 (P-47)
365th Fighter Group, 13 April – 29 July 1945 (P-47)

- Y-90 Giebelstadt, Germany

Later: AAF Station Giebelstadt 9 May 1945
Later: Giebelstadt Army Airfield
Now: Giebelstadt Airfield (IATA: GHF, ICAO: EDQG)
Transferred to United States Army Control, 1 August 1968
Located: 49°38′52″N 009°57′54″E
Captured: 3 April 1945 Opened: 5 April 1945
Runway: 6000/120, CON, (08/26)
Used by:

50th Fighter Group, 20 April – 21 May 1945 (P-47)
417th Night Fighter Squadron, 24 April – 21 May 1945 (P-61)

Closed 23 June 2006

- Y-91 Hanau/Langendiebach, Germany

Transferred to United States Army control
Later: Fliegerhorst Kaserne/Hanau Army Airfield
Now: closed; to be developed
Located: 50°10′03″N 008°57′41″E
Opened: 6 April – 31 August 1946
Runway: 4000x120 PSP (10/28)
Use: Supply and Evacuation Airfield; Tactical Air Depot

- Y-96 Kassel/Waldau, Germany

Transferred to United States Army control
Later: Waldau Kaserne (Waldau Army Airfield/Waldau Kaserne)
Located: 51°16′52″N 009°30′19″E
Opened: 5 April – 31 October 1945
Runway: 4000x120 CON (01/19)
Use: Supply and Evacuation Airfield; Tactical Air Depot

- R-6 Kitzingen, Germany

Later: AAF Station Kitzingen
Transferred to United States Army control
Was: Kitzingen Army Airfield (Harvey Barracks) (Closed)
Now: Kitzingen Airport (IATA: KGZ, ICAO: ETIN)
Located: 49°44′34″N 010°12′09″E
Captured: 11 April 1945 Opened: 15 April 1945
Runway: 5500/120, ASP/CON, (04/22)
Used by:

405th Fighter Group, 30 April – 8 May 1945

- R-10 Illesheim, Germany

Later: AAF Station Illesheim
Transferred to United States Army control
Now: Storck Barracks United States Army
Located: 49°28′24″N 010°23′11″E
Captured 16 April 1945 Opened: 17 April 1945
Runway: 4500/120, PAP, (06/24)
Used by:

48th Fighter Group, 29 April – 5 July 1945
362d Fighter Group, 3–12 May 1945

- R-14 Detmold, Germany

Later: AAF Station Detmold
Transferred to British Royal Army control
Later: BAOR/Army Air Corps Hobart Barracks (Closed 1995)
Now: Flugplatz Detmold
Located: 51°56′26″N 008°54′15″E
Opened: 11 April – 22 June 1945
Runway: 3300x120 SOD (09/27)
Use: Supply and Evacuation airfield, Tactical Air Depot

- R-24 Würzburg, Germany

Transferred to United States Army control
Later Leighton Army Airfield (Heliport)
Located: 49°47′20″N 009°58′35″E
Opened: 17 April – 15 May 1945
Runway: 3000x120 SOD (12/30)
Use: Supply and Evacuation airfield

Transferred to United States Army

- R-25 Schweinfurt, Germany

Later: AAF Station Schweinfurt; Schweinfurt Air Base
Transferred to United States Army control
Now: Schweinfurt Army Heliport (ICAO: ETOA)
Located: 50°02′58″N 010°10′09″E
Captured 18 April 1945, Wartime use: S&E Field

474th Fighter Group, 16 June – 25 October 1945
86th Fighter Group, 23 October 1945 – 15 February 1946
355th Fighter Group, 15 April – 1 August 1946
52d Fighter Group, 9 November 1946 – 5 May 1947
507th Air Materiel Squadron, 1 June – 31 September 1947 (Air Technical Service Command)

- R-26 Bayreuth/Bindlach, Germany

Later: AAF Station Bayreuth/Bindlach
Transferred to United States Army control
Now: Bindlacher Berg Airport (IATA: BYU, ICAO: EDQD)
Located: 49°59′05″N 011°38′24″E
Captured 18 April 1945, Wartime use: S&E Field

366th Fighter Group, 25 June – 14 September 1945

Closed and Inactivated 30 September 1945

- R-29 Herzogenaurach, Germany

Later: AAF Station Herzogenaurach
Transferred to United States Army, 28 February 1946 (Herzo-Base); Closed 1992
Now: Herzogenaurach Airport (IATA: HZH, ICAO: EDQH)
Located: 49°34′57″N 010°52′42″E
Captured 19 April 1945, Wartime use: S&E Field

354th Fighter Group, May 1945 – 15 February 1946
320th Bombardment Group, 18 June – October 1945

- R-40 Bremen, Germany

Later: AAF Station Bremen
Now: Bremen Airport
Located: 53°02′51″N 008°47′12″E
Opened: 30 April 1949
Runway 1: 4115x164 CON 08/26
Runway 2: 3319x165 CON 13/31
Runway 3: 2869x164 CON 18/36
Use: Supply and Evacuation Airfield

- R-42 Buchschwabach, Germany

Later: AAF Station Buchschwabach
Now: abandoned
Located: 49°22′10″N 010°51′41″E
Captured 21 April 1945; Opened: 21 April – 31 August 1945
Runway: 5000x120 SOD/PHS 08/26
Use: Supply and Evacuation Airfield
368th Fighter Group, 13 May – 13 August 1945 (P-47)

- R-45 Ansbach, Germany

Later: AAF Station Ansbach
Transferred to United States Army control
Now: Katterbach Kaserne United States Army
Located: 49°18′33″N 010°38′18″E
Captured: 23 April 1945 Opened: 29 April 1945
Runway: 4000/120, PAP, (07/25)
Used by:

354th Fighter Group, 30 April – 18 May 1945

- R-50 Stuttgart/Echterdingen, Germany

Later: AAF Station Stuttgart/Echterdingen
Now: Stuttgart Airport (IATA: STR, ICAO: EDDS)
Located: 48°41′19″N 009°12′40″E
Captured 25 April 1945, Opened 7 May 1945

324th Fighter Group, 8 May – 20 October 1945
404th Fighter Group, 23 June – 2 August 1945
27th Fighter Group, 15 September – 20 October 1945
371st Fighter Group, September – October 1945
474th Fighter Group, 25 October – 21 November 1945

Closed 30 November 1945 (Remains as USAF transport auxiliary airfield used occasionally by Air Mobility Command)

- R-54 Landsberg/East, Germany

Later: AAF Station Landsberg
Now: Landsberg-Lech Air Base (ICAO: ETSA)
Located: 48°04′15″N 010°54′24″E
Opened: 1 June – 31 August 1945
Runway: 3800x150 SOD (13/31)
Use: Military Storage Airfield

- R-56 Nordholz, Germany

Later: AAF Station Nordholz
Now: Nordholz Naval Airbase (ICAO: ETMN)
Located: 53°46′04″N 008°39′36″E
Occupied 16 May 1945, Opened 5 June 1945

406th Fighter Group, 5 June 1945 – 20 August 1946
86th Fighter Group, 20 August – 1 December 1946

86th FG squadrons remained deployed to Nordholz AB on rotating basis until 31 December 1947 providing air defence of Bremen area.

Closed 31 December 1947 (Remains in use as host to deployed USAF ACC/ANG fighter units to Germany)

- R-57 Bremerhaven, Germany

Later: AAF Station Bremerhaven; Bremerhaven Army Airfield
Located: 53°35′00″N 008°33′23″E
Opened: 16 May – 31 August 1945 Closed: 1993
Runway: 3200x250 SOD (06/24)
Use: Liaison Airfield

- R-67 Memmingen, Germany

Later AAF Station Memmingen; Memmingen Air Base
Now: Memmingen Airport
Located: 47°59′17″N 010°14′16″E
Opened: 29 April – 15 June 1945
Runway: 4089x250 CCN (06/24)
Use: Supply and Evacuation Airfield

- R-68 Straubing, Germany

Later: AAF Station Straubing
Transferred to United States Army, 31 August 1946 (Mansfield Kaserne)
Now: Straubing Wallmuhle Airport (IATA: RBM, ICAO: EDMS)
Located: 48°54′06″N 012°30′59″E
Captured 30 April 1945 Wartime use: S&E Field

405th Fighter Group, 8 May – July 1945
362d Fighter Group, 12 May – August 1945
368th Fighter Group, 13 August 1945 – 20 August 1946

- R-70 Kaufbeuren, Germany

Later: AAF Station Kaufbeuren; Kaufbeuren Air Base
Turned over to the German Air Force, 16 December 1957
Now: Fliegerhorst Kaufbeuren
Located: 47°51′43″N 010°36′52″E
Opened: 1 May 1945
Runway: 5000x120 PSP (02/20)
Use: Supply & Evacuation/Fighter Bomber Airfield

60th Troop Carrier Wing
7320th Air Force Wing
7330th Flying Training Wing

- R-71 Lechfeld, Germany

Later: AAF Station Lechfeld
Closed 1 June 1947, placed in standby status.
Turned over to the German Air Force, 1 January 1956
Now: Fliegerhorst Lechfeld
Located: 48°11′10″N 010°51′42″E
Captured 1 May 1945, Opened 1 December 1945

305th Bombardment Group, December 1945 – December 1946
306th Bombardment Group, 13–25 December 1946
86th Fighter Group, 1 December 1946 – 5 March 1947

- R-72 Fürstenfeldbruck, Germany

Later: AAF Station Fürstenfeldbruck; Fürstenfeldbruck Air Base
Turned over to the German Air Force, 1960
Now: Fliegerhorst Fürstenfeldbruck
Located: 48°12′24″N 011°15′59″E
Opened: 2 May 1945
Runway: 6000x150 CON (09/27)
Use: Supply & Evacuation Airfield

36th Fighter-Bomber Wing
117th Tactical Reconnaissance Wing
10th Tactical Reconnaissance Wing
7330th Flying Training Wing

- R-74 Oberwiesenfeld, Germany

Was: Oberwiesenfeld Airport (Munich) (closed 1968)
Later: AAF Station Oberwiesenfeld
Transferred to control of the United States Army: Oberwiesenfeld Army Airfield
Now: Olympiapark, Munich
Located: 48°10′12″N 011°33′06″E (approximately)
Opened: 2 May 1945 – 1957
Runway: 3000x120 SOD (14/32)
Use: Supply & Evacuation Airfield

- R-77 Gablingen, Germany

Transferred to United States Army, 1 July 1946
Was: Gablingen Kaserne
Was: AAF Station Gablingen
Now: Non-aviation use
Located: 48°27′05″N 010°51′37″E
Captured 7 May 1945, Opened 15 May 1945

323d Bombardment Group, 15 May – 16 July 1945
355th Fighter Group, 3 July 1945 – 15 April 1946

- R-78 Landsberg, Germany

Later: AAF Station Landsberg; Landsberg Air Base
Turned over to West German Luftwaffe (Bundesluftwaffe: federal air force) 31 December 1957
Now: Landsberg-Lech Air Base (IATA: ETSA)
Located: 48°04′18″N 010°54′25″E
Captured 7 May 1945, Wartime use: S&E Field, Tactical Air Depot

323d Bombardment Group, 16 July – October 1945
34th Air Depot (later Air Ammunition Depot), 1 August 1945 – 31 December 1949
2d Air Division, 10 June 1949 – 7 May 1951
7280th/7030th Support Group, 1 January 1950 – 1 January 1954
7351st Flying Training Wing (ATC), 1 January 1954 – 31 December 1957

- R-81 Oberpfaffenhofen, Germany

Later: AAF Station Oberpfaffenhofen; Oberpfaffenhofen Air Depot
Now: Oberpfaffenhofen Airport
Located: 48°04′58″N 011°17′09″E
Opened: 5 May 1945
Runway: 5000x150 CON (04/22)
Use: Supply and Evacuation airfield; Tactical Air Depot

- R-82 Munich/Riem, Germany

Later: AAF Station Munich-Riem; Munich Air Base
Returned to German civil control: 30 June 1957
Was: Munich-Riem Airport (Closed 16 May 1992)
Now: non-aviation use
Located: 48°08′16″N 011°41′25″E
Captured 6 May 1945, Wartime use: S&E Field, Tactical Air Depot

442d Troop Carrier Group, September 1945 – 30 September 1946
60th Troop Carrier Group, 30 September 1946 – 14 May 1948 (elements at Munich AFB/AB until 1955)
Munich Air Depot (ATSC), 1 February 1946 – 31 May 1948
1602d Air Transport Wing (MATS), 1 June 1948 – 31 December 1956

- R-85 Munich/Neubiberg

Later: AAF Station Munich-Neubiberg; Neubiberg Air Base
Turned over to the German Air Force: 1 June 1958
Now: Neubiberg Air Base (Non-Flying)
Located: 48°04′22″N 011°38′13″E
Occupied 15 May 1945, Opened 22 June 1945

70th Fighter Wing, 10 November 1945 – 25 September 1947
357th Fighter Group, 21 July 1945 – 20 August 1946
33d Fighter Group, 20 August 1946 – July 1947
86th Fighter Group, 12 June 1947 – 9 August 1952
317th Troop Carrier Group, 21 March 1953 – 17 April 1957
7101st Air Base Group, 1 April 1957 – 1 June 1958

- R-87 Horsching, Austria

Later: AAF Station Hoersching
Located: 48°14′00″N 014°11′15″E
Turned over to Provisional Austrian Government, 1 July 1947
Now: Linz Airport (IATA: LNZ, ICAO: LOWL)
Occupied: 5 May 1945, Wartime use: S&E Field

17th Bombardment Group, 27 June – 31 October 1945
79th Fighter Group, July 1945 – 25 June 1947

- R-91 Erding, Germany

Later AAF Station Erding
Later Erding Air Base
Turned over to the German Air Force, 1 April 1957
Now: Fliegerhorst Erding
Located: 48°49′20″N 011°56′54″E
Opened: 15 August 1945
Runway: 4500x120 PSP (08/26)
Use: Tactical Air Depot

85th Air Depot Wing
440th Fighter-Interceptor Squadron
52d Tactical Fighter Group

- R-92 Vienna/Tulln, Austria

Later: AAF Station Tulln
Redesignated: Tulln Air Base, 26 September 1947
Turned over to Austrian Government, 15 May 1955
Now: Fliegerhorst Brumowski (ICAO: LOXT)
Located: 48°19′16″N 016°06′43″E
Occupied: 12 August 1945

1407th AAF Base Unit, 27 July 1945 – 31 May 1947
516th Troop Carrier Group, 4 September 1945 – 20 December 1947
313th Troop Carrier Group, 30 September 1946 – 25 June 1947
7360th Base Complement Squadron, 1 June 1947 – 15 May 1955

- R-95 Tempelhof, Occupied Berlin

Later: AAF Station Tempelhof; Tempelhof Airbase; Tempelhof Central Airport
Until 2008 (now closed): Tempelhof Airport
Located: 52°28′23″N 013°24′14″E
Opened: 10 July 1945 – July 1994
Runway: 4987x120 PSP (08/26)
Use: Air Transport

- R-96 Erlangen, Germany

Later: AAF Station Erlangen
Turned over to United States Army (Ferris Barracks), 15 October 1947
Located: 49°33′22″N 011°02′50″E
Runway: 3000x75 PSP (04/22)
Headquarters:

XII Tactical Air Command, 1 July – November 1945
IX Fighter Command, September – November 1945
40th Bombardment Wing, 15 November 1945 – 25 December 1946
14th Liaison Squadron, 22 April – 4 May 1945

- R-98 Bad Kissingen, Germany

Later: AAF Station Bad Kissingen
Transferred to United States Army, 31 December 1947
Now: Bad Kissingen Airfield, (ICAO: EDFK)
Located: 50°12′39″N 010°04′09″E
Occupied: 7 April 1945, Opened 6 June 1945, Liaison Field

316th Station Complement Squadron, 6 June – 31 December 1945
64th Fighter Wing, 1 December 1945 – 5 June 1947
XII Tactical Air Command, 1 November 1945 – 10 November 1947
86th Fighter Group, 5 March – 12 June 1947
52d Fighter Group, 5 May – 25 June 1947
33d Fighter Group, 15 July – August 1947

=== Royal Air Force ALGs ===
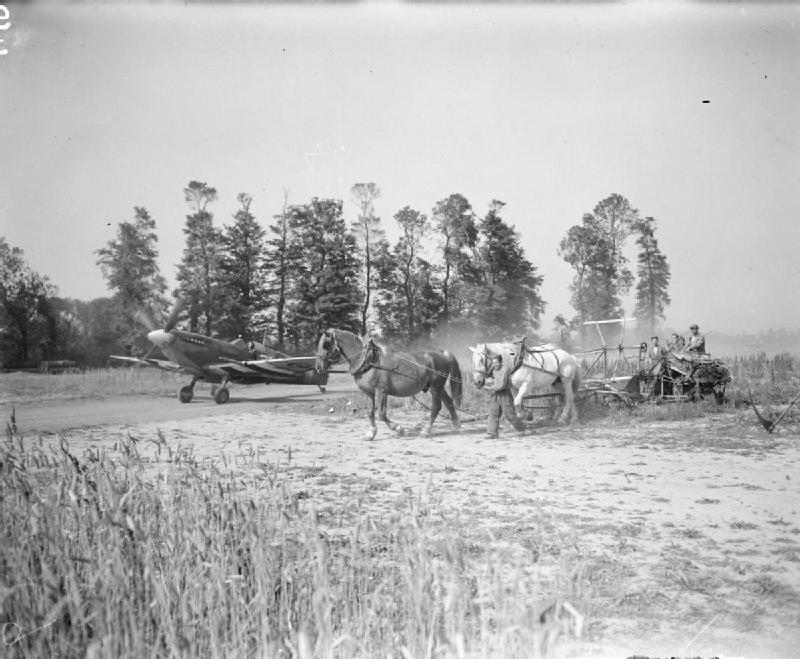
A Spitfire Mark IX of No. 443 Squadron RCAF taxies to dispersal at B-2 Bazenville, alongside a field where French farmers are gathering in the wheat

Advanced Landing Ground airfields built by the Royal Engineers or 2TAF's Airfield Construction service for the Royal Air Force and units under British operation command were given "B" designations. Some of these were also used by USAAF Troop Carrier Groups and Command and Control organisations.

Airfield	Operational	Notes	Coordinates
B-1 Asnelles-sur-Mer, France - off Gold Beach	operational (Spitfires) on D+4		49°20′25″N 000°34′58″W
B-2 Bazenville Airfield, Lower Normandy France	RAF, RCAF, FFAF		49°18′17″N 000°33′43″W
B-3 Sainte-Croix-sur-Mer Airfield, Lower Normandy, France	RAF FFAF		49°19′08″N 000°31′06″W
B-4 Beny-sur-Mer, France (RCAF)			49°17′54″N 000°25′49″W
B-5 Le Fresne-Camilly, France			49°15′58″N 000°29′07″W
B-6 Coulombs, France	from August 1944 occupied by No. 137 Squadron RAF Typhoons		49°14′41″N 000°33′07″W
B-7 [[Martragny][Vaux-sur-Seulles]], France			49°15′11″N 000°36′58″W
B-8 Sommervieu, France			49°18′00″N 000°40′43″W
B-9 Lantheuil, France (RAF, RCAF)			49°16′22″N 000°31′41″W
B-10 Plumetot, France			49°16′42″N 000°21′20″W (approximately)
B-11 Longues-sur-Mer, France	21 June 1944 to 4 September 1944; No. 602 City of Glasgow Squadron RAF; No. 132 City of Bombay Squadron RAF, No. 453 Squadron RAAF, No. 441 Squadron RCAF.		49°20′34″N 000°41′27″W
B-12 Ellon, France	18 July 1944 - No. 122 Squadron RAF	1,700 m runway	49°12′58″N 000°39′52″W
B-14 Amblie, France			49°17′21″N 000°29′25″W
B-15 Ryes, France			49°18′46″N 000°37′25″W (approximately)
B-16 Villons-les-Buissons, France (RAF, RNAF)			49°14′07″N 000°24′29″W
B-17 Caen/Carpiquet, France		Captured from German forces in July 1944 during Battle for Caen Now Caen – Carpiquet Airport	49°10′36″N 000°27′26″W
B-18 Cristot, France			49°11′41″N 000°34′48″W (approximately)
B-19 Lingevres, France			49°10′30″N 000°40′23″W (approximately)
B-20 Demouville, France			49°10′41″N 000°16′08″W (approximately)
B-21 Sainte-Honorine, France			48°49′28″N 000°29′08″W (approximately)
B-22 Authie, France			49°12′23″N 000°25′52″W (approximately)
B-23 La Rue Huguenot, France			49°12′06″N 000°26′10″E (approximately)
B-24 St-André de l'Euree, France	November 1944 – September 1945; No. 184 Squadron RAF; 442d Troop Carrier Group USAAF	Runway 1: 5260x250 CON (14/32); Runway 2: 5220x250 CON (06/24); Now Saint-André-de-l'Eure Airport	48°53′43″N 001°15′05″E
B-25 Le Theil-Nolent, France			49°09′15″N 000°32′17″E (approximately)
B-26 Illiers-l'Évêque, France			48°49′18″N 001°16′01″E (approximately)
B-27 Boisney, France			49°09′16″N 000°39′21″E (approximately)
B-28 Évreux, France		French Air Force base Évreux-Fauville Air Base	49°01′39″N 001°13′06″E
B-29 Valailles, France			49°07′18″N 000°36′06″E (approximately)
B-30 Creton, France			48°49′53″N 001°17′17″E (approximately)
B-31 Fresnoy Folny, France			49°53′16″N 001°29′43″E (approximately)
B-32 Prey, France			48°57′47″N 001°12′43″E (approximately)
B-33 Campneuseville, France			49°51′32″N 001°29′27″E (approximately)
B-34 Avrilly, France			48°32′21″N 000°36′52″W (approximately)
B-35 Godelemesnil, France			50°00′19″N 001°24′44″E (approximately)
B-36 Boussey, France		now: La Couture-Boussey	48°53′52″N 001°24′21″E (approximately),
B-37 Corroy, France			48°42′08″N 003°56′20″E (approximately)
B-38 La Lande-sur-Eure, France			48°33′26″N 000°51′50″E (approximately)
B-39 Ecouffler, France (Undetermined)			
B-40 Beauvais/Nivillers, France			49°27′23″N 002°09′58″E (approximately
B-42		re-designated as A-61 Beauvais/Tille)	
B-43 St Omer/Ft Rouge, France			50°45′01″N 002°15′07″E (approximately
B-44 Poix, France	Used by USAAF 314th Troop Carrier Group, February–October 1945	Runway: 5160x165 CON/ASP (04/22) RAF ALG,	48°57′52″N 004°36′57″E
B-45 St Omer/Lcnguenessen, France			50°44′16″N 002°14′43″E (approximately)
B-46 Grandvilliers, France			49°39′57″N 001°56′23″E (approximately)
B-48 Amiens, France	315th Troop Carrier Group, 6 April – May 1945; 438th Troop Carrier Group, – 3 May August 1945; HQ, 52d Troop Carrier Wing, 5 March – 20 June 1945	RAF ALG, Used by USAAF. Now Amiens-Glisy Airport; Runway 1: 5310x164 CON (12/30); Runway 2: 5244x164 CON (05/23)	49°52′20″N 002°23′20″E
B-50 Vitry-en-Artois, France		Runway 1: 5400x160 CON (11/29); Runway 2: 5250x160 TAR (05/23)	50°20′14″N 002°59′31″E
B-51 Lille/Vendeville, France		Now Aéroport de Lille-Lesquin,	50°34′00″N 003°06′11″E
B-52 Douai/Dechy, France			50°21′09″N 003°07′43″E
B-53/AAF-182 Merville, France		Runway 1: 5280x160 CON (04/22); Runway 2: 5280x160 CON (14/32)	50°37′01″N 002°38′27″E
B-54 Achiet, France	313th Troop Carrier Group, 28 February – 4 August 1945	Runway 1: 3960x150 CON (11/29) Runway 2: 4950x250 ASP (03/21)	50°06′19″N 002°47′04″E
B-55 Courtrai/Wevelghem, Belgium		Now the Internationale luchthaven Kortrijk-Wevelgem airport	50°49′08″N 003°12′35″E
B-56 Brussels/Evere, Belgium			50°54′03″N 004°20′09″E
B-57 Lille/Wambrechies, France		now Marcq-en-Baroeul Airport	50°41′14″N 003°04′33″E
B-58 Brussels/Melsbroek, Belgium			50°54′26″N 004°29′33″E

- B-59 Ypres/Vlamertinghe, Belgium

Located: 50°49′25″N 002°50′01″E

- B-60 Grimberghen, Belgium

Located: 50°56′56″N 004°23′31″E

- B-61 SintDenijs-Westrem, Belgium

Located: 51°01′36″N 003°41′22″E

- B-62 (Re-designated as A-92 Sint-Truiden)
- B-63 Bruges/St. Croix, Belgium

Located: 51°12′51″N 003°15′05″E (approximately)

- B-64 Diest/Schaffen, Belgium

Located: 51°00′07″N 005°03′52″E (approximately)

- B-65 Maldegem, Belgium

Located: 51°11′53″N 003°28′41″E

- B-66 Blakenberg, Belgium

Located: 50°56′43″N 005°03′01″E

- B-67 Ursel, Belgium

Located: 51°07′30″N 003°27′14″E

( now a Belgian Air Force reserve base) (ICAO code EBUR)

- B-68 (Re-designated as A-89 Le Culot)
- B-69 Meerbeke, Belgium

Located: 50°49′25″N 004°02′26″E (approximately)

- B-70 Antwerp/Deurne, Belgium

Now: Antwerp International Airport
Located: 51°11′24″N 004°27′41″E

- B-71 Coxyde, Belgium

Located: 51°05′22″N 002°39′22″E

- B-72 (Re-designated as A-75 Cambrai/Epinoy)
- B-73 Moorseele, Belgium

Located: 50°51′06″N 003°08′54″E

- B-74 (Re-designated as A-83 Denain/Prouvy)
- B-75 Nivelles, Belgium

Located: 50°35′53″N 004°19′42″E (approximately)

- B-76 Peer, Belgium

Located: 51°10′01″N 005°28′03″E

- B-77 Gilze/Rijen, Netherlands

Located: 51°33′50″N 004°56′18″E

- B-78 Eindhoven, Netherlands(also Vligerbasis Eindhoven)

Located: 51°27′04″N 005°22′29″E

- B-79 Woensdrecht, Netherlands

Located: 51°26′55″N 004°20′31″E

- B-80 Volkel, Netherlands

Located: 51°39′27″N 005°42′22″E

- B-81 Le Madrillet, France

49°23′11″N 001°04′15″E (approximately)
Now: Technopôle du Madrillet in Saint-Étienne-du-Rouvray near Rouen

- B-82 Grave, Netherlands

Located: 51°45′32″N 005°44′18″E (approximately)

- B-83 Knokke-Le Zoute, Belgium

Located: 51°21′21″N 003°20′56″E

- B-84 Rips, Netherlands

Located: 51°31′N 005°51′E

- B-85 Schijndel, Netherlands

Located: 51°36′N 005°29′E (approximately)

- B-86 Helmond, Netherlands

Located: 51°28′41″N 005°39′04″E (approximately)

- B-87 Rosieres-en-Santerre, France

Located: 49°48′17″N 002°44′45″E
Runway 1: 5400x160 CON (04/22)
Runway 2: 5300x160 CON (16/34)

RAF ALG, Assigned to USAAF 387th Bombardment Group, 24 May – November 1945

- B-88 Heesch, Netherlands

Located: 51°43′59″N 005°31′34″E (approximately)

- B-89 Mill, Netherlands

Located: 51°41′11″N 005°47′01″E (approximately)

- B-90 Kleine Brogel, Belgium

Located: 51°10′01″N 005°27′00″E (approximately)
Now: Belgian Air Force Base Kleine Brogel

- B-91 Kluis, Netherlands

Located: 51°47′07″N 005°52′51″E

- B-92 Abbeville/Drucat, France

Located: 50°08′30″N 001°49′51″E
Runway: 4893x164 CON/ASP (09/27)
Use:

RAF ALG, Used by USAAF 61st Troop Carrier Group, 13 March – 19 May 1945

- B-93 Valkenburg (near Katwijk/Leiden), Netherlands

Located: 52°10′15″N 004°25′29″E (approximately)

- B-95 Teuge, Netherlands

Located: 52°14′33″N 006°02′49″E

- B-97 Amsterdam/Schiphol, Netherlands (IATA code AMS; ICAO code EHAM)

Located: 52°18′56″N 004°45′34″E

- B-100 Goch, Germany

Later: RAF Laarbruch
Located: 51°36′08″N 006°08′31″E

- B-101 Nordhorn, Germany

Located: 52°25′47″N 007°04′25″E (approximately)

- B-102 Vorst, Germany

Located: 51°18′16″N 006°25′43″E (approximately)

- B-103 Plantlünne, Germany

Located: 52°26′03″N 007°24′09″E (approximately)
Later: RAF Plantlünne 1945

- B-104 Damme, Germany

Located: 52°29′25″N 008°11′16″E (approximately)
Later: Verkehrslandeplatz Damme (EDWC)

- B-105 Drope, Germany

Located: 52°34′42″N 007°29′43″E (approximately)

- B-106 Twente/Enschede, Netherlands

Located: 52°16′30″N 006°53′11″E

- B-107 Lingen, Germany

Located: 52°31′33″N 007°19′27″E (approximately)

- B-108 Rheine, Germany

Located: 52°17′31″N 007°29′09″E

- B-109 Quakenbrück, Germany

Now: Quakenbrück Glider Airfield
Located: 52°39′47″N 007°55′29″E

- B-110 Achmer, Germany

Located: 52°22′39″N 007°54′43″E

- B-111 Ahlhorn, Germany

became Fliegerhorst Ahlhorn (ICAO code EDNA) closed early 1990s
Located: 52°53′19″N 008°13′56″E

- B-112 Hopsten, Germany

became Fliegerhorst Hopsten (ICAO EDNP-later ETNP)
Located: 52°17′31″N 007°29′09″E

- B-113 Varrelbusch, Germany

Located: 52°54′30″N 008°02′35″E

- B-114 Diepholz, Germany

Located: 52°35′07″N 008°20′27″E

- B-115 Melle, Germany

Located: 52°11′59″N 008°20′06″E (approximately)

- B-116 Wunstorf, Germany

Located: 52°27′17″N 009°25′44″E

- B-117 Jever, Germany

Located: 53°32′02″N 007°53′05″E

- B-118 Celle, Germany

Located: 52°35′59″N 010°01′37″E

- B-119 Wahn, Germany

Located: 50°51′57″N 007°08′34″E (approximately)
Later: RAF Wahn 1945
Now: Flughafen Köln-Bonn "Konrad Adenauer"

- B-120 Hanover/Langenhagen, Germany

Located: 52°27′42″N 009°41′12″E

- B-150 Hustedt, Germany

Located: 52°53′46″N 009°05′46″E (approximately)

- B-151 Bückeburg, Germany

Located: 52°16′41″N 009°04′49″E

- B-152 Fassberg, Germany

Located: 52°55′09″N 010°10′59″E

- B-153 Bad Oeynhausen, Germany

Located: 52°12′29″N 008°48′16″E (approximately)

- B-154 Reinsehlen, Germany

Located: 53°08′50″N 009°47′41″E

- B-155 Dedelstorf, Germany

Now: Segelfluggelände Glider Airfield
Located: 52°42′58″N 010°31′58″E

- B-156 Luneburg, Germany - now Lüneburg Airfield

Located: 53°14′50″N 010°24′31″E (approximately)

- B-157 Werl, Germany

Located: 51°33′30″N 007°54′36″E (approximately)

- B-158 Lübeck, Germany

Located: 53°48′18″N 010°43′07″E

- B-159 Mahlen, Germany (Undetermined)
- B-160 Copenhagen/Kastrup, Denmark

Located: 55°37′13″N 012°38′57″E

- B-162 Stade, Germany

Located: 53°35′32″N 009°28′21″E (approximately)

- B-163 Dortmund, Germany

Located: 51°32′27″N 007°33′30″E

- B-164 Schleswigland, Germany

Located: 54°27′34″N 009°30′59″E
Later: RAF Schleswigland 1945
Now: Fliegerhorst Schleswig (alt. Fliegerhorst Jagel)

- B-166 Flensburg, Germany

Located: 54°46′25″N 009°22′36″E

- B-167 Kiel/Holtenau, Germany

Located: 54°22′46″N 010°08′39″E

- B-168 Hamburg/Fuhlsbuttel, Germany

Located: 53°37′49″N 009°59′27″E

- B-170 Westerland, Germany

Located: 54°54′51″N 008°20′27″E

- B-172 Husum, Germany

Located: 54°30′55″N 009°08′41″E

- B-174 Uetersen, Germany

Located: 53°38′50″N 009°42′21″E

== See also ==
- ALG Wormhout
