= Maitzborn Airfield =

Former military airfield in the Rhineland-Palatinate, Germany

Maitzborn Airfield Advanced Landing Ground Y-70
- Maitzborn Airfield (Germany)

Site information
- Type: Military Airfield

Location
- Coordinates: 49°56′18″N 007°25′35″E

Site history
- In use: 1945
- Battles/wars: Western Front (World War II)

Maitzborn Airfield is a former military airfield located 1.7 km east-southeast of Kirchberg in Rhineland-Palatinate, Germany.

== History ==
The airfield's origins are undetermined. Maitzborn was captured by the United States Army in March 1945 as part of the Western Allied invasion of Germany. The airfield was repaired by IX Engineering Command, Ninth Air Force into an Army Air Forces advanced Landing Ground, designated Y-70. Air Force units used the airfield as a casualty evacuation and combat resupply airfield by the IX Air Force Service Command. After the German Capitulation on 8 May, it was abandoned.
