= Göllheim Airfield =

Former military airfield in Germany

Göllheim Airfield Advanced Landing Ground Y-66
- Göllheim Airfield (Germany)

Site information
- Type: Military Airfield

Location
- Coordinates: 49°35′19″N 008°01′44″E

Site history
- In use: 1945
- Battles/wars: Western Front (World War II)

Göllheim Airfield is a former military airfield, located 4.2 km west-southwest of Göllheim in Rhineland-Palatinate, Germany.

== History ==
The airfield's origins are undetermined. Göllheim was captured by the United States Army in March 1945 as part of the Western Allied invasion of Germany. The airfield was repaired by IX Engineering Command, Ninth Air Force into an Army Air Forces advanced Landing Ground, designated Y-66. Air Force units used the airfield as a casualty evacuation and combat resupply airfield by the IX Air Service Command. After the German Capitulation on 8 May, it was abandoned.
