= Saint-Laurent-sur-Mer Airfield =

Abandoned World War II military airfield

Saint-Laurent-sur-Mer Advanced Landing Ground (ALG) A-21

- Saint-Laurent-sur-Mer, France Saint-Laurent-sur-Mer Airfield (France)

Site information
- Type: Military airfield
- Controlled by: United States Army Air Forces, 1944

Location
- Coordinates: 49°21′49″N 000°52′26″W

Site history
- Built by: IX Engineering Command
- In use: June–August 1944
- Materials: Compressed Earth
- Battles/wars: Western Front (World War II); Northern France Campaign

Saint-Laurent-sur-Mer is an abandoned World War II military airfield, which is located near the commune of Saint-Laurent-sur-Mer in the Normandy region of northern France.

Located just outside Saint-Laurent-sur-Mer, the United States Army Air Forces established a temporary airfield shortly after D-Day on 8 June 1944, shortly after the Allied landings in France. It was the first airfield established in the liberated area of Normandy, being constructed by the IX Engineering Command, 834th Engineer Aviation Battalion.

== History ==
Known as Advanced Landing Ground "A-21", the airfield consisted of a single 3400' compressed earth runway aligned 11/28. In addition, with tents were used for billeting and also for support facilities; an access road was built to the existing road infrastructure; a dump for supplies, ammunition, and gasoline drums, along with a drinkable water and minimal electrical grid for communications and station lighting.

The airfield was completed as emergency airstrip E-1 at the end of D-Day, the invasion of France. On 8 and 9 June 1944 an RAF Ames Type 15 GCI (Ground Control Interceptor) radar site was active on the west side of the airfield, but it moved to Saint-Pierre-du-Mont in the night of 9 and 10 June. It was expanded and then taken into service by IX Service Command as a transport airfield accepting aircraft up to the size of a C-47. The C-47s brought fresh infantry to the beachhead and flew out again with casualties. It was also used as an emergency landing airfield for combat aircraft.

After the Americans moved east into Central France with the advancing Allied Armies, the airfield was closed on 25 August 1944. Today the airfield is indistinguishable from the agricultural fields in the area.
