= Fliegerhorst Vlamertinge =

Military air base in West Flanders, Belgium

Fliegerhorst Vlamertinge Advanced Landing Ground B-59

Site information
- Type: Military airfield

Location
- Coordinates: 50°49′58″N 002°49′25″E

Site history
- In use: 1941–1945
- Battles/wars: World War II

Airfield information
- IATA: none; ICAO: none

Summary
- Coordinates: 50°49′58″N 002°49′25″E

Map
- Location of Fligenhorst Vlamertinge

Runways
Direction	Length		Surface
Direction	ft	m	Surface
12/30	2,000	607	Concrete

Fliegerhorst Vlamertinge is a former military air base, located 8.4 km east-southeast of Poperinge in West Flanders, Belgium. It was closed in 1945 and is now in agricultural use.

== History ==
After the German invasion of Belgium in May 1940, the area was surveyed by military engineers looking for a suitable location to establish a Luftwaffe military airfield. During 1941 Vlamertinge airfield was begun by a construction team, although most of the construction was begun on land near the village of Dikkebus, a few KM south. A grass runway was laid out and some buildings of wood were set up.

In 1942, a 4 km length of ring road was constructed and a 2,000' concrete runway was laid out. The ring road had branches to various hardstands and maintenance shops, and some small aircraft shelters. It is unknown which Luftwaffe units used the facility during the period of German occupation.

After the Allied invasion of France in June 1944, the Germans destroyed the runway on 10 June, and later the buildings on 2 September. The landing field was plowed up and electrical wiring was removed. British forces moved through the area in late 1944 and aviation engineers were able to restore the base for operations by Royal Air Force fighter and Allied transport aircraft. It was re-designated Advance Landing Ground B-59.

The RAF continued operations from the field until March 1945, when it was abandoned and turned over to local authorities. Over the years, the runway was removed and the land returned to agricultural use. Many old German buildings were converted to agricultural buildings and are still scattered around the area.
