= Blakenberg Airfield =

Former airfield in Brabant, Belgium

Blakenberg Airfield Advanced Landing Ground B-66
- Blakenberg Airfield (Belgium)

Site information
- Type: Military Airfield

Location
- Coordinates: 50°56′43″N 005°03′01″E

Site history
- In use: 1944-1945
- Battles/wars: World War II

Blakenberg Airfield is a former World War II Allied airfield, located 4.9 km south of Diest in Flemish Brabant, Belgium.

== History ==
Blakenberg Airfield was established by Canadian aviation engineers in late 1944 as a temporary military airfield. Designated "Advance Landing Ground B-66. It was to be used by the RCAF 39th Reconnaissance Wing. Unfortunately, the land selected for the airfield was quite muddy in the rain and laying down Pierced Steel Planking (PSP) had little effect and it was quickly abandoned.

The only known use of the airfield was by a USAAF B-17 Flying Fortress that made an emergency landing on 25 November 1944. The plane was so damaged by combat and the landing it was written off and remained at the airfield. It was scavenged by the local populace and slowly dismantled over time.

The land was returned to local farmers after the war, ending its military use and was returned to agriculture.
