= Saint-Jean-de-Daye Airfield =

Former airfield in Normandy, France

Saint-Jean-de-Daye Airfield Advanced Landing Ground A-18

Site information
- Type: Military Airfield
- Controlled by: United States Army Air Forces

Location
- Coordinates: 49°13′04″N 001°09′11″W

Site history
- In use: 2 August – 9 September 1944
- Battles/wars: Western Front (World War II)

Saint-Jean-de-Daye Airfield is a former World War II airfield, located 1.7 km southeast of Saint-Jean-de-Daye in the Normandy region, France.

== History ==
Saint-Jean-de-Daye Airfield was located along the main road from the national 8 174 a little below St. Jean de Daye to D 900 long straight line leading to Périers start of Operation Cobra, the decisive battle, from 24 July 1944 to 30 July 1944, to pierce the front in the South of the Cotentin.

It was after this battle that the 843rd Engineer Battalion of the Air (843rd Engineer Battalion Airfield or EAB) began the works of construction of new airfield normally reserved for fighter-bombers in accordance with the specification provided for this type of field oriented southwest–northeast (62 °) in the territory of the municipality and not the Dézert St Jean de Daye which he took the name yet, certainly not for long, because if it was open to air traffic on August 29, he was returned to the French civil authorities on September 5 a week after it opened!

There was therefore no units of the 9th it was attached. Its activity, from the testimony of residents of that time, however, was intense throughout much of August, well before its official opening. Many transport aircraft and also frequented the civilian refugees housed in proximity also noticed movement "small aircraft" from it. It is likely that the speed with which Britain was released, allowing the use of many airfields rendered useless by the assignment to a combat unit called to follow more closely than TUSA from Normandy.

The exact location of the runway is still clearly visible today because it is the straightness of the road D 389 E 389 from D to its shift towards the town of Menil-Véneron
