= Poupeville Airfield =

Poupeville Airfield Emergency Landing Ground ELS-1

Site information
- Type: Military Airfield
- Controlled by: United States Army Air Forces, 1944

Location
- Coordinates: 49°22′57″N 001°12′06″W

Site history
- In use: 6 June 1944-Undetermined
- Battles/wars: Western Front (World War II)

Poupeville Airfield is a former World War II airfield, located 1.7 km southeast of Sainte-Marie-du-Mont in the Normandy region, France. It was the first airfield established by the United States Army Air Forces in France, being constructed on D-Day, 6 June 1944.

== History ==
Consisting of nothing more than a sod 2000' emergency landing strip hastily built by IX Engineering Command on D-Day, the airfield served as the first safe location for Allied aircraft having to make an emergency landing on the beachhead. It was only intended for landings and not for takeoffs. Brigadier-General Pete Quesada flew to Normandy on D+2 arriving on Landing Strip 1, nearly killing an engineer who was still finishing off the airfield. According to the IX Engineer Command website it is not known when the airstrip was released back to its owners.
