= Colleville-sur-Mer Airfield =

Abandoned World War II military airfield in France

Colleville-sur-Mer Airfield Advanced Landing Ground (ALG) A-12
- Saint-Laurent-sur-Mer, France

Site information
- Type: Military airfield
- Controlled by: United States Army Air Forces

Location
- Coordinates: 49°20′18″N 000°50′08″W

Site history
- Built by: IX Engineering Command
- In use: June–August 1944
- Materials: Compressed Earth
- Battles/wars: Western Front (World War II); Northern France Campaign

Colleville-sur-Mer is an abandoned World War II military airfield, which is located near the commune of Carentan in the Normandy region of northern France.

Located just outside La Fontaine, the United States Army Air Forces established a temporary airfield shortly after D-Day on 8 June 1944, shortly after the Allied landings in France The airfield was one of the first established in the liberated area of Normandy, being constructed by the IX Engineering Command, 832d Engineer Aviation Battalion.
