= Marcq-en-Baroeul Airfield =

Marcq-en-Baroeul Airfield Aérodrome de Marcq-en-Barœul/Bondues
- IATA: none; ICAO: LFQO

Summary
- Location: Lille, France
- Elevation AMSL: 164 ft / 50 m
- Coordinates: 50°41′14″N 003°04′33″E

Maps
- Nord-Pas-de-Calais region in France

- Location of Marcq-en-Baroeul/Bondues Airport

Marcq-en-Baroeul Airfield is a rcreational civil aerodrome, located in the localities of Marcq-en-Barœul and Bondues, 6.1 kilometres (3.8 mi) north-northeast of Lille, French Flanders, France.

== Overview ==
It is a small grass airfield used for general aviation.

== History ==
During World War II, the aerodrome was used by the British Royal Air Force as Advanced Landing Ground B-57 Lille/Wambrechies.
