= Sint-Denijs-Westrem Airfield =

Former airfield in Ghent, Belgium

Sint-Denijs-Westrem Airport Vliegveld Sint-Denijs-Westrem
- IATA: none; ICAO: none

Summary
- Location: Sint-Denijs-Westrem, Ghent, Belgium
- Coordinates: 51°01′36″N 003°41′22″E

Map
- Location of Sint-Denijs-Westrem Airfield

Sint-Denijs-Westrem Airport is a closed civil airport and military airfield, located in Sint-Denijs-Westrem, 3.2 km southwest of Ghent, East Flanders, Belgium.

== Overview ==
The airport is the former official airport of Ghent. It was closed in 1985, and the site redeveloped for Flanders Expo.

== History ==
During World War II, the airport was used by the British Royal Air Force as Advanced Landing Ground B-61 SintDenijs-Westrem.
