= 140th Operations Group =

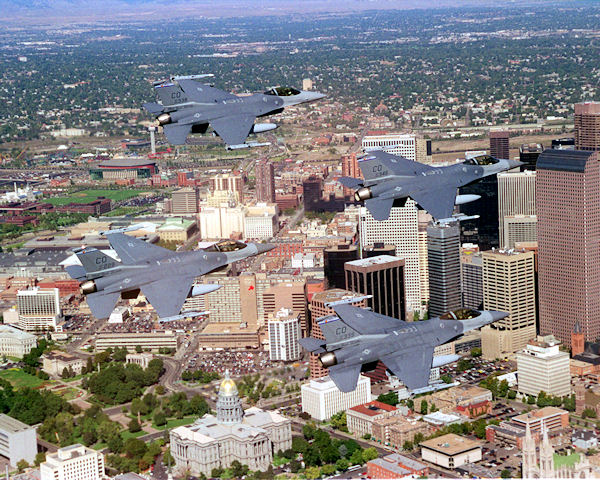
- F-16s of the 140th TFW over Denver, Colorado
- Active: 1943–1945; 1946–1974; 1993 – present
- Country: United States
- Allegiance: Colorado
- Branch: Air National Guard
- Type: Group
- Role: Composite Fighter/Transport
- Part of: Colorado Air National Guard
- Garrison/HQ: Buckley Space Force Base
- Engagements: European Theater of World War II Operation Northern Watch, Operation Southern Watch, Operation Noble Eagle, Operation Enduring Freedom; Operation Iraqi Freedom.
- Decorations: Distinguished Unit Citation Belgian Fourragere Air Force Outstanding Unit Award

Insignia
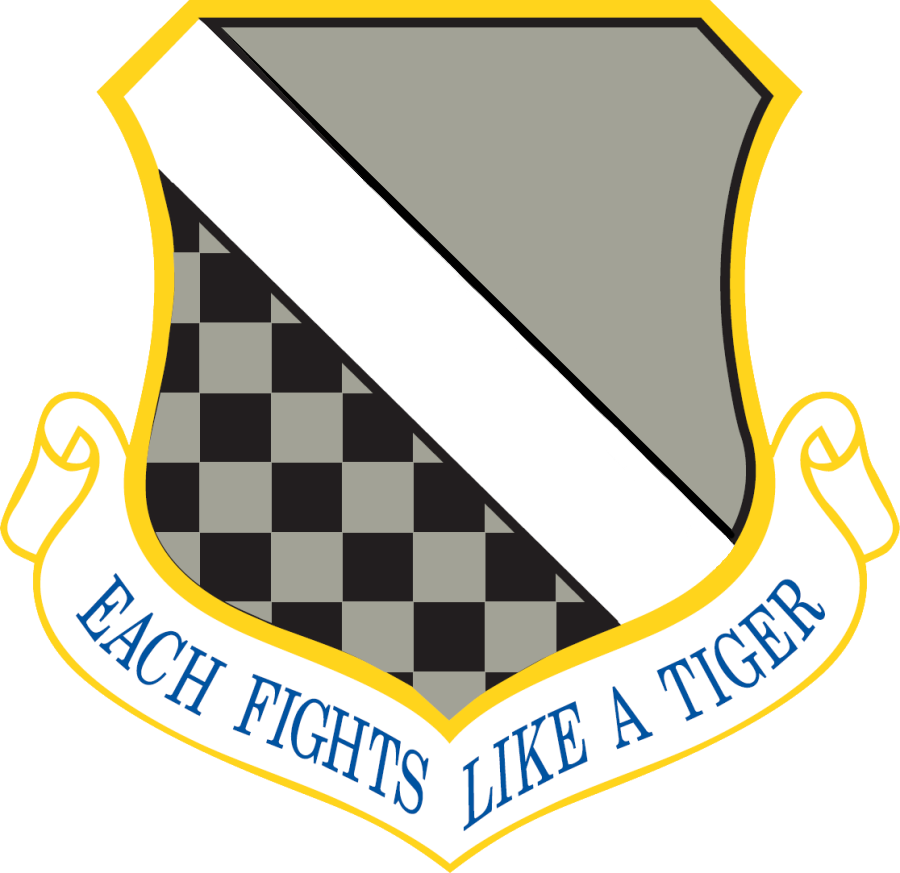
- 140th Operations Group emblem
- Tail Code: CO "Colorado" tail stripe

The 140th Operations Group is a unit of the Colorado Air National Guard, stationed at Buckley Space Force Base, Aurora, Colorado. If activated to federal service, the group is gained by Air Combat Command of the United States Air Force.

The group was activated as the 370th Fighter Group and served in the European Theater of World War II where it earned two Distinguished Unit Citations and was awarded the Belgian Fourragere after being cited twice in the Order of the Day of the Belgian Army.

In 1946 the group, now redesignated the 140th Fighter Group, was one of the original twenty-seven regular Army Air Forces groups allotted to the National Guard. Since 1950 the group has controlled the operational squadrons of the 140th Wing, except for the period 1974–1993, when the group was inactive.

== Overview ==
The 140th flies F-16C/D/ Fighting Falcons (Air Combat Command) fighter and C-21 Learjet (Air Mobility Command) airlift missions. It also controls the 137th Space Warning Squadron (Air Force Space Command).

== Units ==
The 140th Operations Group

120th Fighter Squadron: Operates the F-16 Fighting Falcon, a dual-purpose fighter squadron with pilots qualified to perform air-to-air and air-to-ground missions, including offensive counter-air, defensive counter-air, air interdiction, close air support, and search and rescue missions.
200th Airlift Squadron: Operates the C-21A Learjet. It provides secure priority airlift for the highest level of military and civilian leaders throughout the world.

- 140th Operations Support Squadron

== History ==
=== World War II ===
The unit was constituted as the 370th Fighter Group in May 1943, and activated on 1 July 1943 at Westover Field, Massachusetts. The original squadrons of the group were the 401st, 402d and 485th Fighter Squadrons.

The group trained with Republic P-47 Thunderbolts at several First Air Force bases in New England then was deployed to RAF Aldermaston England during January and February 1944. In Europe, it became an element of Ninth Air Force.

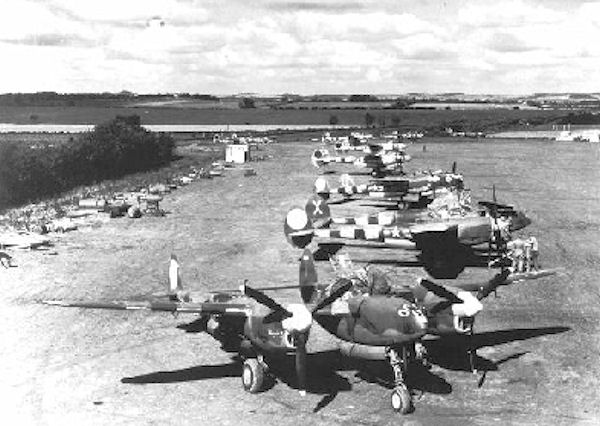
P-38s of the 370th Fighter Group

When the group arrived, they expected to receive Thunderbolts on which they had trained stateside. However, much to the amazement of the Group Commander, Colonel Howard F. Nichols, the 370th FG was informed by IX Fighter Command that it would be equipped with the Lockheed P-38 Lightning, a few of which had already arrived during the 18 days the group was in residence at Aldermaston. The latter base proved to be only a temporary station, as it was required for troop carrier operations; the 370th soon moved to RAF Andover.

From England, the group dive-bombed radar installations and flak towers, and escorted bombers that attacked bridges and marshalling yards in France as the Allies prepared for Operation Overlord, the invasion of the continent of Europe. The group provided cover for Allied forces that crossed the Channel on D-Day, and flew armed reconnaissance missions over the Cotentin Peninsula until the end of the month. On 17 July 1944, napalm incendiary bombs were dropped for the first time in war by 14 P-38 aircraft of the 402nd Fighter Squadron, led by 370th Group commander Col Nichols, on a fuel depot at Coutances, near St. Lô, France.

The group transferred to IX Tactical Air Command and moved the Advanced Landing Ground at Cardonville, France on 24 July to support the Allied ground advance across France and into Germany. The 370th's fighter-bombers hit hard. German Field Marshal von Kluge soon found that his armored forces moving towards Normandy were constantly beset by Allied fighter-bomber attacks. Von Kluge phoned General Walter Warlimont, Hitler's personal representative on the Western front, "The enemy air superiority is terrific and smothers almost every one of our movements...Every movement of the enemy is prepared and protected by its air force. Losses in men and equipment are extraordinary." Von Kluge himself was not immune to personal danger. USAAF Group Commander Nichols and a squadron of his P-38 Lightnings blasted von Kluge's own headquarters; the group commander himself skipped a 500-pound bomb right through the front door. Moving across France, the 370th FG hit gun emplacements, troops, supply dumps, and tanks near Saint-Lô in July and in the Falaise–Argentan area in August 1944.

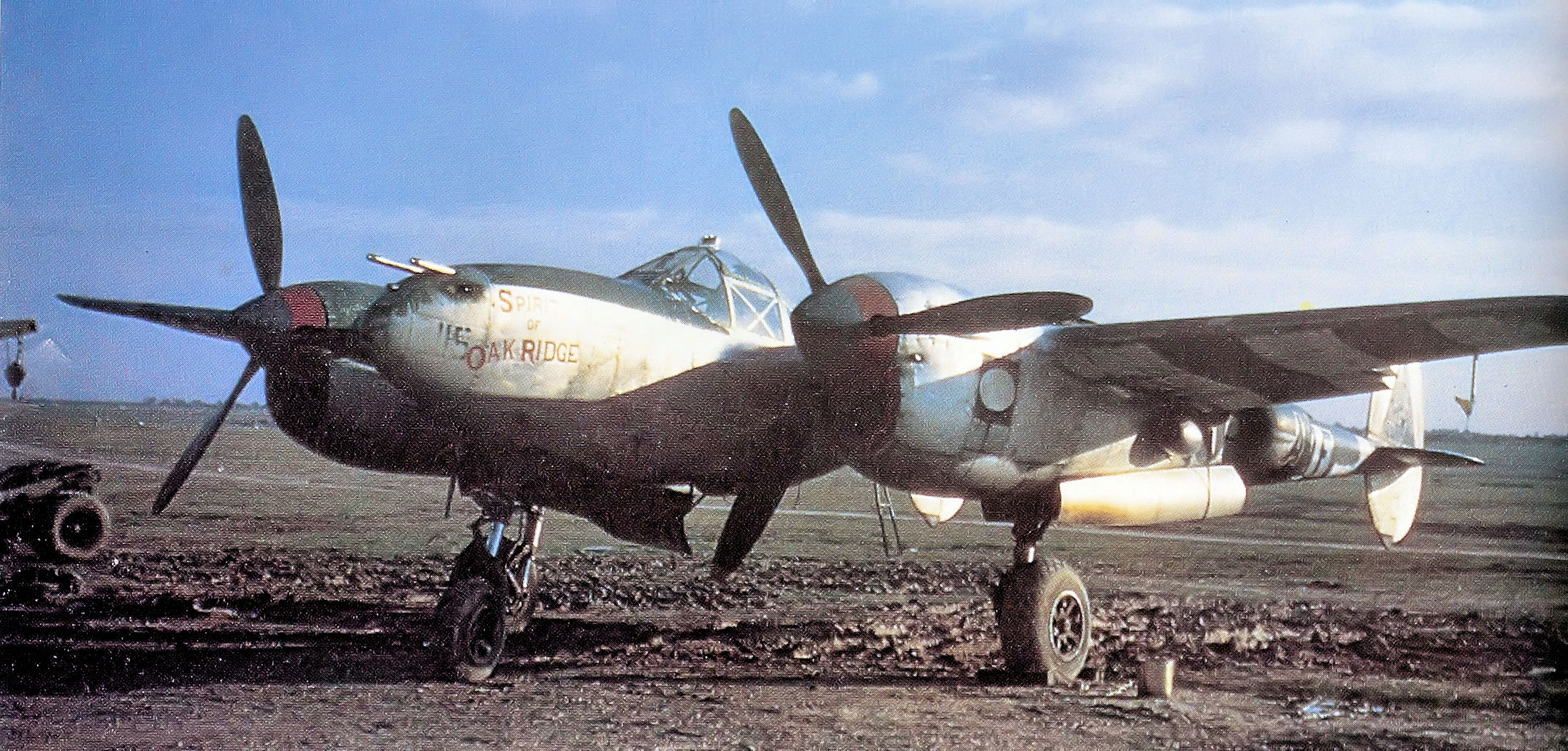
P-38 Lightning, "Spirit of Oak Ridge", 485th Fighter Squadron, at Lonray, October 1944.

In September 1944, the group sent planes and pilots to England to provide cover for Operation Market-Garden, the allied airborne assault on the Netherlands and Germany. The P-38s of the group struck pillboxes and troops early in October to aid First Army's capture of Aachen, and afterward struck railroads, bridges, viaducts, and tunnels in that area.

The 370th received a Distinguished Unit Citation for a mission in support of ground forces in the Hurtgen Forest area on 2 December 1944 when, despite bad weather and barrages of antiaircraft and small-arms fire, the group dropped napalm bombs on a heavily defended position in Bergstein, setting fire to the village and inflicting heavy casualties on enemy troops defending the area. The 370th later flew armed reconnaissance during the Battle of the Bulge, attacking warehouses, highways, railroads, motor transports, and other targets.

The group converted to North American P-51 Mustangs during February – March 1945. It bombed bridges and docks in the vicinity of Wesel to prepare for the crossing of the Rhine, and patrolled the area as paratroops were dropped on the east bank on 24 March Supported operations of 2d Armored Division in the Ruhr Valley in April. The group flew its last mission, a sweep over Dessau and Wittenberg, on 4 May 1945.

The 370th FG returned to the United States during September–November 1945, and was inactivated on 7 November 1945.

=== Colorado Air National Guard ===
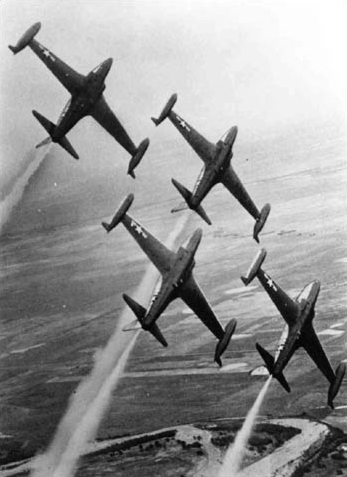
"Minutemen" aerobatics team with F-80Cs, 1956

The 370th Fighter Group was redesignated the 140th Fighter Group, and was allotted to the National Guard on 24 May 1946. It was organized at Buckley Field, Colorado, and was extended federal recognition on 1 October 1946. The unit was the first Air National Guard group receiving federal recognition. The 140th Fighter Group assigned to the 86th Fighter Wing.

The 140th Fighter Group consisted of the 120th Fighter Squadron at Buckley, the 187th Fighter Squadron at Cheyenne Municipal Airport, Wyoming and the 191st Fighter Squadron at Salt Lake City Municipal Airport. Utah. Because it was organized earlier than other National Guard groups, it also temporarily controlled the 127th Fighter Squadron at Wichita Municipal Airport, Kansas and the 173d Fighter Squadron at Lincoln Municipal Airport. Nebraska until the 132d and 137th Fighter Groups were organized in 1948. As part of the Continental Air Command Fourth Air Force, the unit trained for fighter-bomber missions and air-to-air combat. On 31 October 1950 the Air National Guard converted to the wing base organization and 86th Fighter Wing was inactivated, and 140th was assigned to the new 140th Fighter Wing, which assumed the personnel and mission of the 86th.

==== Korean War activation ====
As a result of the Korean War, the 140th Fighter Wing was federalized and brought to active duty on 1 April 1951, including the 140th Fighter Group and subordinate units. The unit was ordered to the new Clovis Air Force Base, New Mexico, arriving in October 1951. The federalized 140th was a composite organization of activated Air National Guard units, composed of the 120th, 187th and 190th Fighter Squadrons. The 140th and its components were equipped with F-51D Mustangs, and were redesignated as Fighter-Bomber squadrons on 12 April 1951. The 140th returned to Air National Guard control in their respective states at the start of 1953.

==== Cold War ====
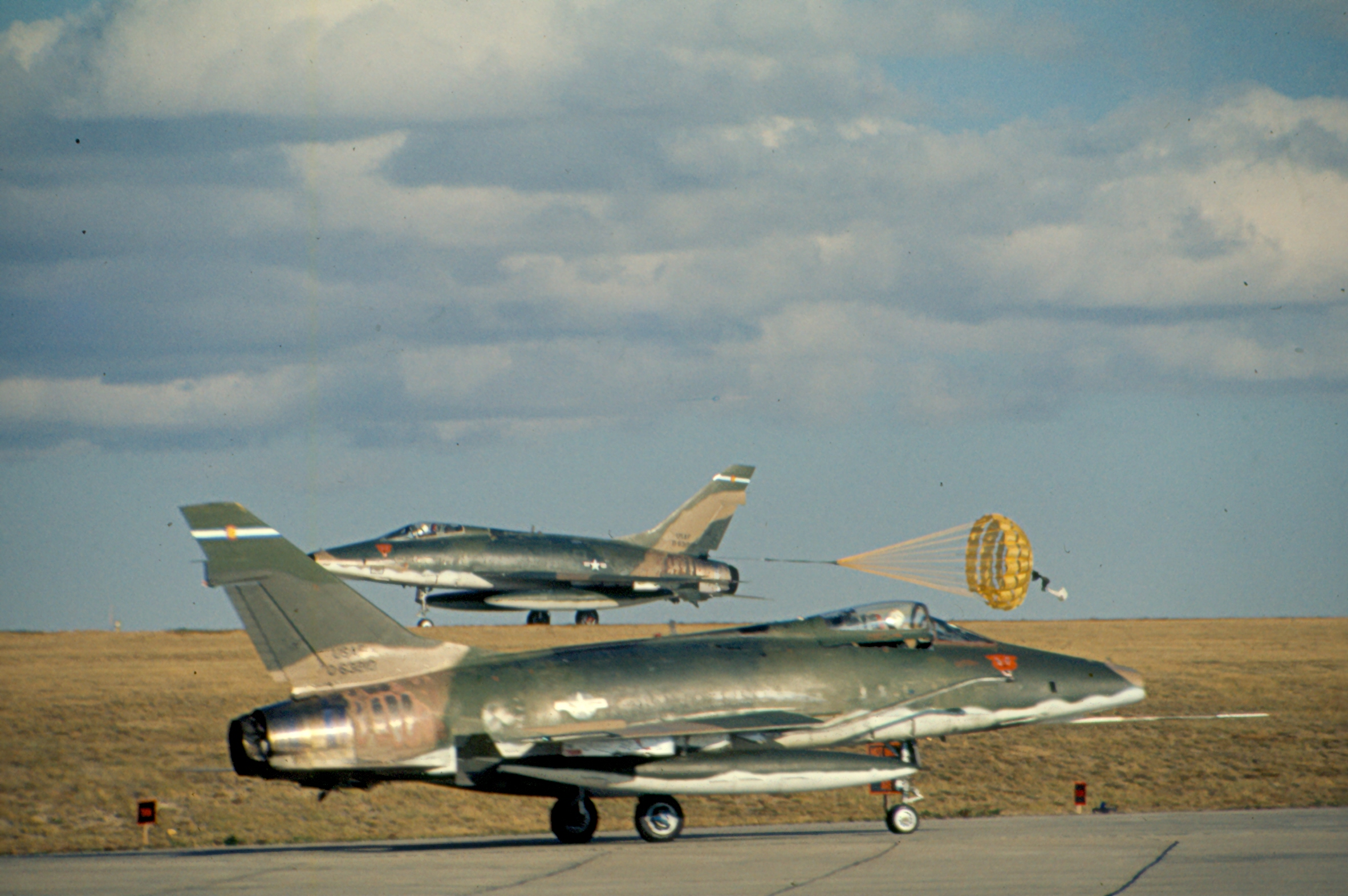
120th TFS F-100D Super Sabres, 1973

Upon return to Colorado state control, the 140th was re-equipped with Lockheed F-80C Shooting Star jets. In 1955 the group's gaining command changed to Air Defense Command and it became the 140th Fighter-Interceptor Group, then the 140th Fighter Group (Air Defense). It converted to North American F-86 Sabres in 1958 and to F-86Ls armed with Mighty Mouse rockets and equipped with airborne intercept radar and data link for interception control through the Semi-Automatic Ground Environment system in 1960. The 140th was returned to Tactical Air Command in January 1961 and re-equipped with the North American F-100 Super Sabre supersonic tactical fighter.

On 26 January 1968, the group was federalized and its 120th Tactical Fighter Squadron was reassigned to the 35th Tactical Fighter Wing at Phan Rang AB, South Vietnam. 120th was released from active duty and returned to Colorado state control on 30 April 1969.

In 1974, the National Guard converted its operational wings to the dual deputy model. As a result, the group was inactivated and its squadrons reassigned directly to the wing.

==== Modern era ====
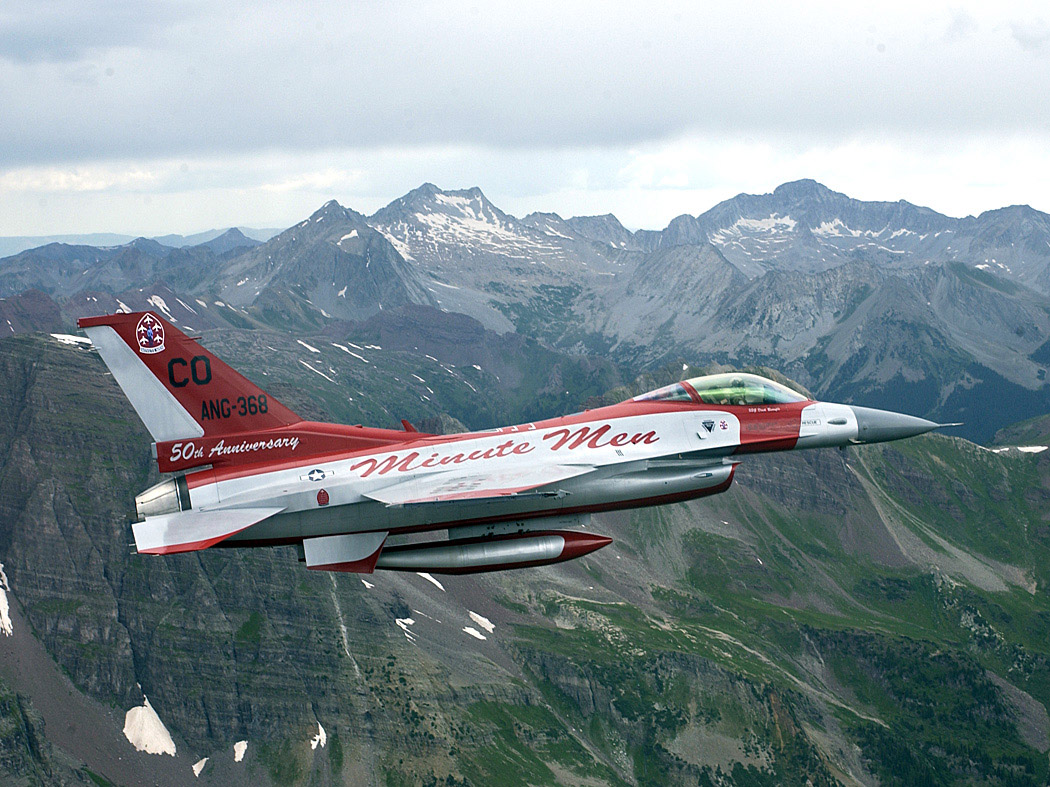
The "Minutemen" F-16C, 2006

Another reorganization of the National Guard, this time to the "Objective Wing" led to the group's reactivation in 1993 as the 140th Operations Group, equipped with General Dynamics F-16 Fighting Falcons. Since reactivation, the 140th has supported numerous deployments. Following the attacks on the United States on September, 11th 2001, the group's 120th Fighter Squadron assumed tasking to provide homeland defense as an integral part of Operation Noble Eagle.

== Lineage ==
- Constituted as the 370th Fighter Group on 25 May 1943

Activated on 1 July 1943
Inactivated on 7 November 1945

- Redesignated 140th Fighter Group. Allotted to the National Guard on 24 May 1946

Organized on 3 September 1946
Extended federal recognition on 1 October 1946
Federalized and placed on active duty, 1 April 1951
Redesignated 140th Fighter-Bomber Group on 12 April 1951
Released from active duty and returned to Colorado state control on 1 January 1953
Redesignated 140th Fighter-Interceptor Group on 1 July 1955
Redesignated 140th Fighter Group (Air Defense) on 1 July 1957
Redesignated: 140th Tactical Fighter Group on 1 January 1961
Federalized and placed on active duty, 25 January 1968
Released from active duty and returned to Colorado state control, 30 April 1969
Inactivated 30 June 1974

- Redesignated: 140th Operations Group

Activated c. 1 January 1993

=== Assignments ===
- I Fighter Command, 1 July 1943 (attached to New York Fighter Wing 19 October 1943 – 20 January 1944)
- IX Fighter Command, 12 February 1944
- 71st Fighter Wing (attached to IX Tactical Air Command after 1 August 1944)
- 70th Fighter Wing, 1 October 1944 (remained attached to IX Tactical Air Command)
- XXIX Tactical Air Command, 1 February 1945 – September 1945
- Army Service Forces, Port of Embarkation (for inactivation), 6 November 1945 – 7 November 1945
- 86th Fighter Wing, 3 September 1946
- 140th Fighter Wing (later 140th Fighter-Bomber Wing, 140th Fighter-Interceptor Wing, 140th Air Defense Wing, 140th Tactical Fighter Wing, 1 November 1950 – 15 December 1952
- 140th Fighter-Bomber Wing (later 140th Fighter-Interceptor Wing, 140th Air Defense Wing, 140th Tactical Fighter Wing), 15 December 1952 – 30 June 1975
- 140th Fighter Wing (later 140th Wing), c. 1 January 1993

=== Components ===
- 120th Fighter (later Fighter-Bomber, Fighter-Interceptor, Tactical Fighter, Fighter) Squadron, 3 September 1946 – 16 January 1968; 30 April 1969 – 30 September 1974; c. 1 January 1993 – Present
- 127th Fighter Squadron, 3 September 1946 – 1948 (Kansas ANG)
- 140th Operations Squadron (later 140th Operations Support Flight, 140th Operations Support Squadron), by April 1961 – c. 20 August 1962, c. 1 January 1993 – present
- 180th Bombardment Squadron, 1 January 1953 – c. March 1953 (Missouri ANG)
- 186th Fighter Squadron, 1 October 1950 – 1 April 1951 (Montana ANG)
- 188th Fighter Squadron (later 188th Fighter-Bomber Squadron, 188th Fighter-Interceptor Squadron), 1 November 1950 – 1 February 1951; 11 September 1952 – 1 January 1952: 1 January 1953 – 1 July 1957 (New Mexico ANG)
- 190th Fighter Squadron (later 191st Fighter-Bomber Squadron), 1 November 1950 – 1 January 1953; 1 January 1953 – 1 July 1955 (Idaho ANG)
- 200th Airlift Squadron, 1 July 1996 – Present
- 401st Fighter Squadron (later 173d Fighter Squadron), 1 July 1943 – 7 November 1945, 3 September 1946 – 1948 (Nebraska ANG)
- 402d Fighter Squadron (later 187th Fighter Squadron, 187th Fighter-Bomber Squadron, 187th Fighter-Interceptor Squadron), 1 July 1943 – 7 November 1945, 3 September 1946 – 1 January 1953; 1 January 1953 – 30 June 1957 (Wyoming ANG)
- 485th Fighter Squadron (7F), 1 July 1943 – 7 November 1945

=== Stations ===
- Westover Field, Massachusetts, 1 July 1943
- Groton Army Air Field, Connecticut, 19 October 1943
- Bradley Field, Connecticut, 5 January 1944 – 20 January 1944
- RAF Aldermaston (Station 467), England, 12 February 1944
- RAF Andover (Station 406), England, 29 February – 19 July 1944
- Cardonville Airfield (A-3), France, 24 July 1944
- La Vieille Airfield (A-19), France, 15 August 1944
- Lonray Airfield (A-45), France, 6 September 1944
- Roye-Amy Airfield (A-73), France, 11 September 1944
- Florennes/Juzaine Airfield (A-78), Belgium 26 September 1944
- Ophoven Airfield (Y-32), Belgium 27 January 1945
- Gütersloh Airfield (Y-99), Germany 20 April 1945
- AAF Station Mannheim/Sandhofen, Germany. 27 June 1945
- AAF Station Fritzlar, Germany, 6 August 1945 – September 1945
- Camp Myles Standish, Massachusetts, c. 6–7 November 1945
- Buckley Field, Colorado 3 September 1946
- Clovis AFB (later Cannon AFB), New Mexico, 12 April 1951 – 1 January 1953
- Buckley Field (later Buckley Air National Guard Base), Colorado, 1 January 1953 – 30 June 1974
- Buckley Air National Guard Base (later Buckley Air Force Base, then Buckley Space Force Base), Colorado, 1 Jan 1993 – present

=== Aircraft ===
- Republic P-47 Thunderbolt, 1943–1944
- Lockheed P-38 Lightning, 1944–1945
- North American P-51 (later F-51) Mustang, 1945: 1946–1953
- Lockheed F-80C Shooting Star, 1953–1958
- F-86E Sabre, 1958–1960
- F-86L Sabre Interceptor, 1960–1961
- F-100C Super Sabre, 1961–1971
- F-100D Super Sabre, 1971–1974
- F-100F Super Sabre, 1961–1974
- A-7D/K Corsair II, 1974–1992
- F-16C/D Fighting Falcon, 1993 – present

== Awards and campaigns ==
Award streamer	Award	Dates	Notes
	Presidential Unit Citation	2 December 1944	370th Fighter Group, Hurtgen Forest
	Air Force Outstanding Unit Award	10 August 1965-1 October 1966	140th Tactical Fighter Group
	Air Force Outstanding Unit Award	1 September 1994-31 August 1996	140th Operations Group
	Air Force Outstanding Unit Award	1 July 2006 – 30 June 2008	140th Operations Group
	Belgian Fourragere	6 June 1944-30 September 1944; 1 October 1944; 16 December 1944 – 25 January 1945	370th Fighter Group

Campaign Streamer	Campaign	Dates	Notes
	Air Offensive, Europe	12 February 1944 – 5 June 1944	370th Fighter Group
	Normandy	6 June 1944 – 24 July 1944	370th Fighter Group
	Northern France	25 July 1944 – 14 September 1944	370th Fighter Group
	Rhineland	15 September 1944 – 21 March 1945	370th Fighter Group
	Ardennes-Alsace	16 December 1944 – 25 January 1945	370th Fighter Group
	Central Europe	22 March 1944 – 21 May 1945	370th Fighter Group
