= 187th Airlift Squadron =

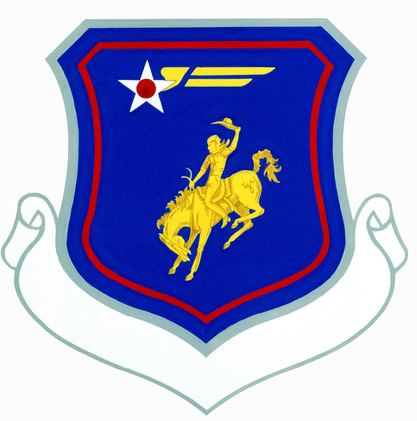
187th Airlift Squadron

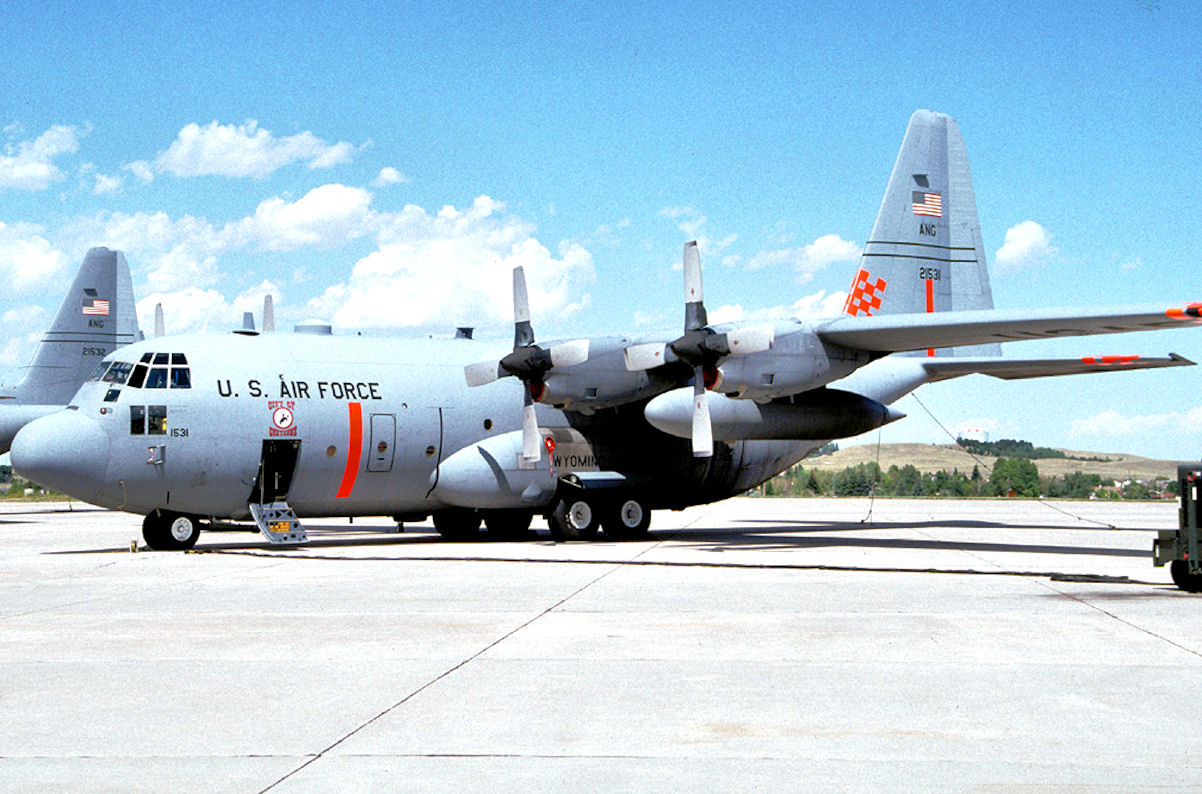
- 187th Airlift Squadron C-130H 92-1531 Modular Airborne Fire Fighting Systems (MAFFS) aerial fire fighting aircraft
- Active: 1943–1945; 1946–1952; 1952–present
- Country: United States
- Allegiance: Wyoming
- Branch: Air National Guard
- Type: Squadron
- Role: Airlift/Aerial Firefighting
- Part of: Wyoming Air National Guard
- Garrison/HQ: Cheyenne Air National Guard Base, Wyoming
- Engagements: European Theater of Operations Korean War

Insignia
- 187th Airlift Squadron

- Tail stripe

The 187th Airlift Squadron is a unit of the Wyoming Air National Guard 153d Airlift Wing. located at Cheyenne Air National Guard Base, Wyoming. The 187th is equipped with the C-130 Hercules.

== History ==
=== World War II ===
The squadron's World War II predecessor unit, the 402d Fighter Squadron was assigned to Ninth Air Force in England, flying its first combat mission on 14 March 1944. Flying P-38 Lightnings, the group received a Distinguished Unit Citation for a mission in support of ground forces in the Hurtgen Forest area of Germany on 2 December 1944 when, despite bad weather and barrages of antiaircraft and small-arms fire, the squadron dropped napalm bombs on a heavily defended position in Bergstein, setting fire to the village and inflicting heavy casualties on enemy troops defending the area. The squadron flew its last combat mission on 3 March 1945.

=== Wyoming Air National Guard ===
The wartime 402d Fighter Squadron was reactivated and redesignated as the 187th Fighter Squadron, and was allotted to the Wyoming Air National Guard, on 24 May 1946. It was organized at Cheyenne Municipal Airport, Wyoming and was extended federal recognition on 11 August 1946 by the National Guard Bureau. The 187th Fighter Squadron was bestowed the history, honors, and colors of the 402d Fighter Squadron. The squadron was equipped with F-51D Mustangs and was assigned to the 86th Fighter Wing, Buckley Field, Colorado. As part of the Continental Air Command Fourth Air Force, the unit trained for tactical fighter missions and air-to-air combat.

==== Korean War activation ====
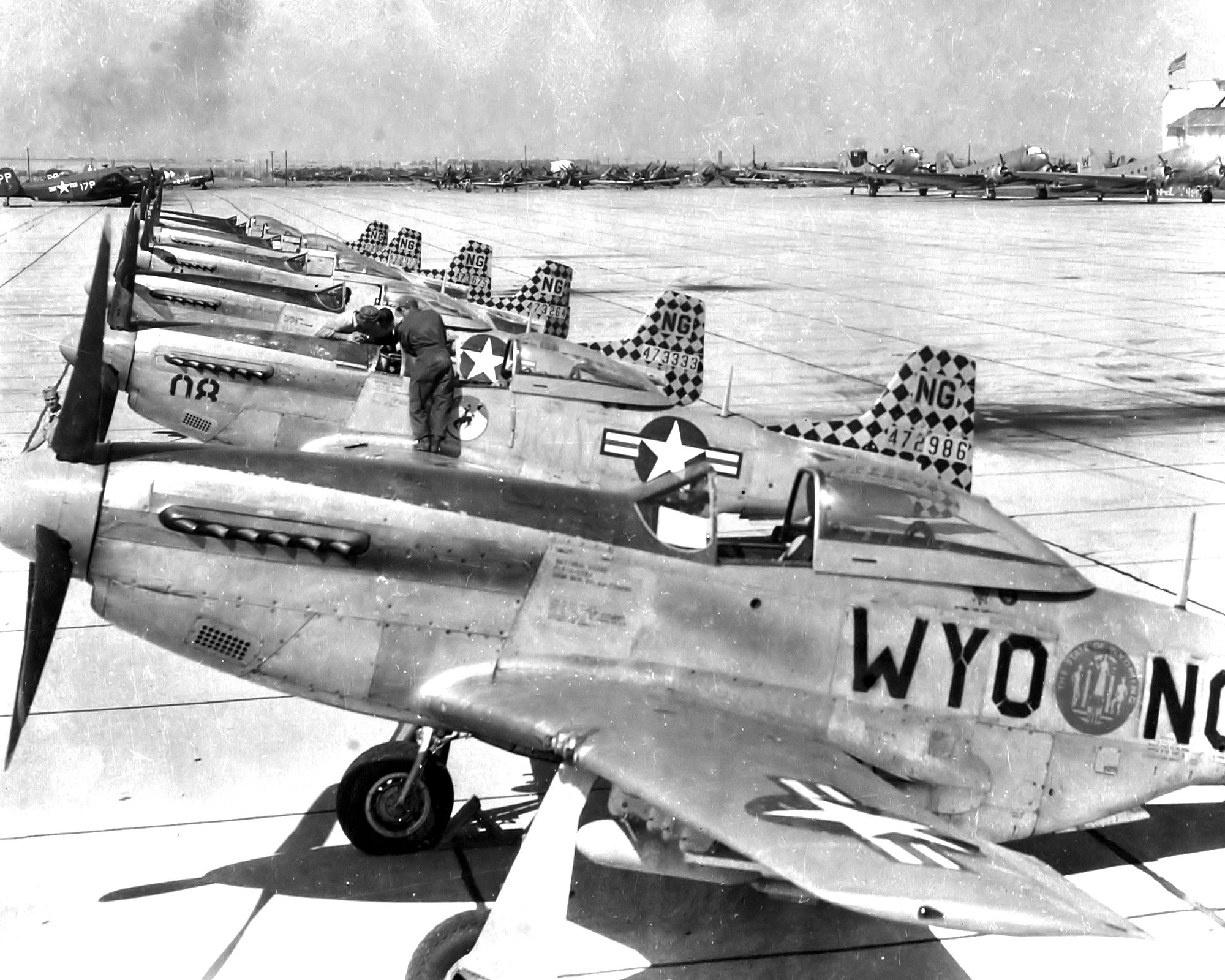
F-51 Mustangs at Cheyenne Municipal Airport

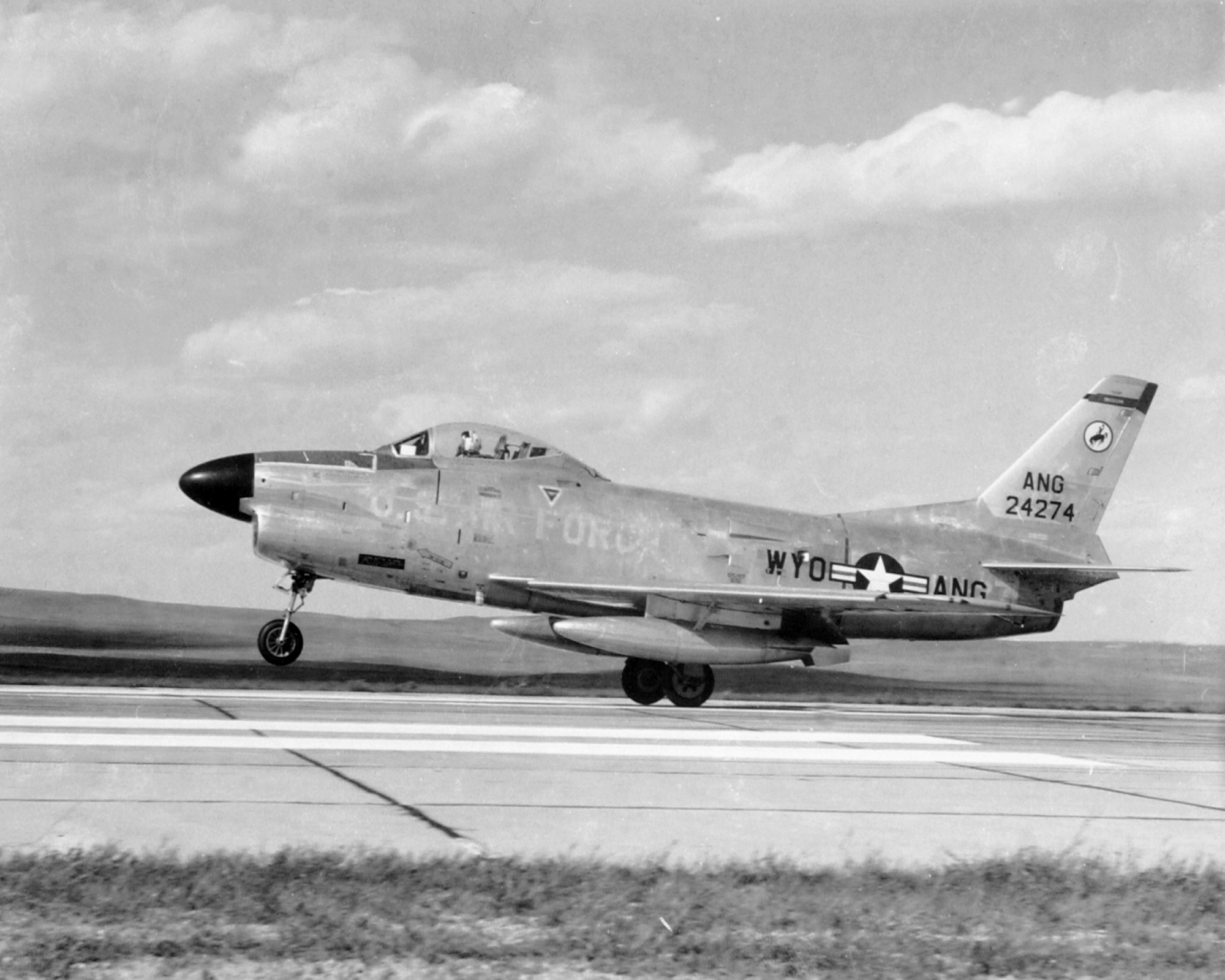
North American F-86L Sabre Interceptor 52-4274

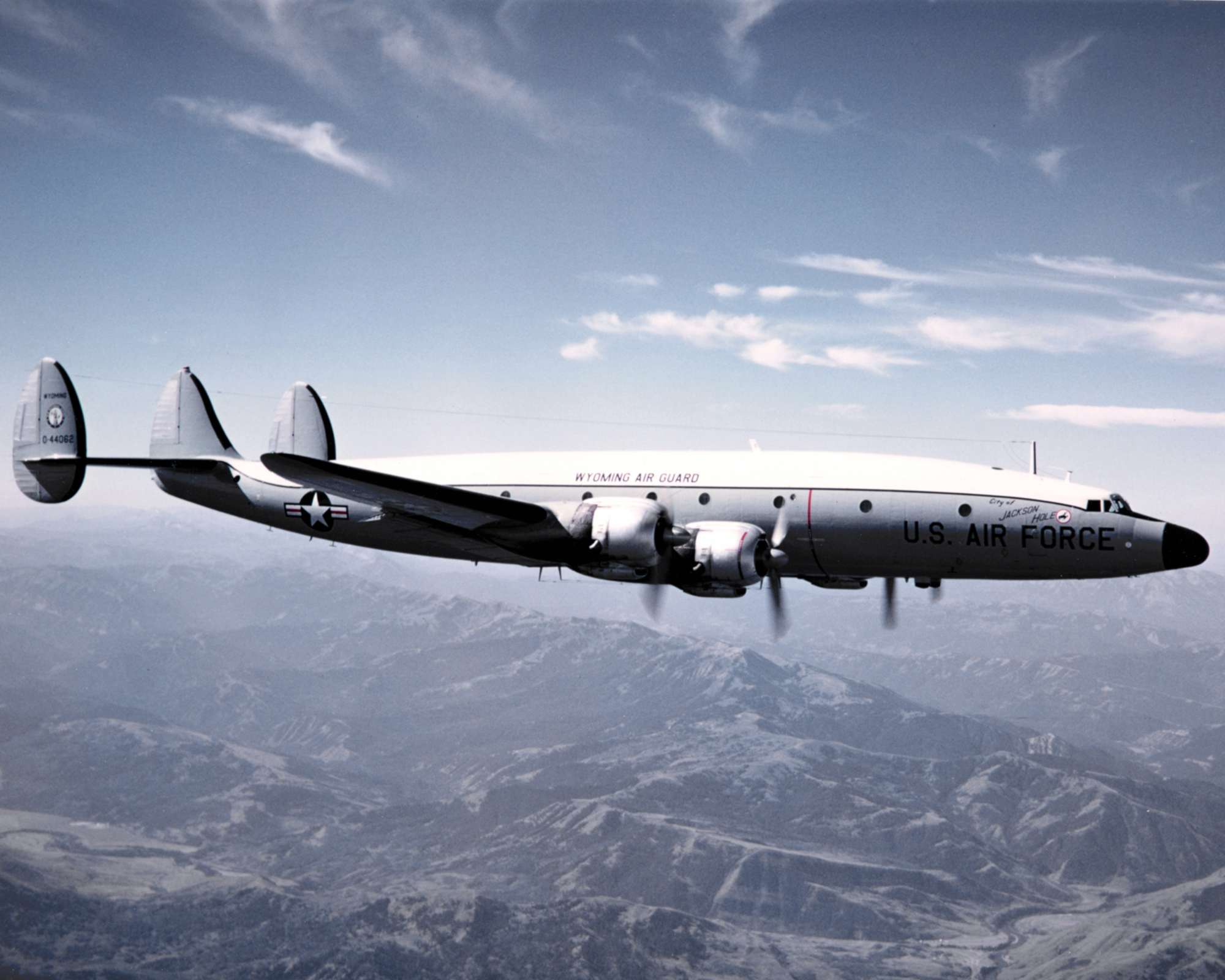
Lockheed C-121G Constellation 54-4062

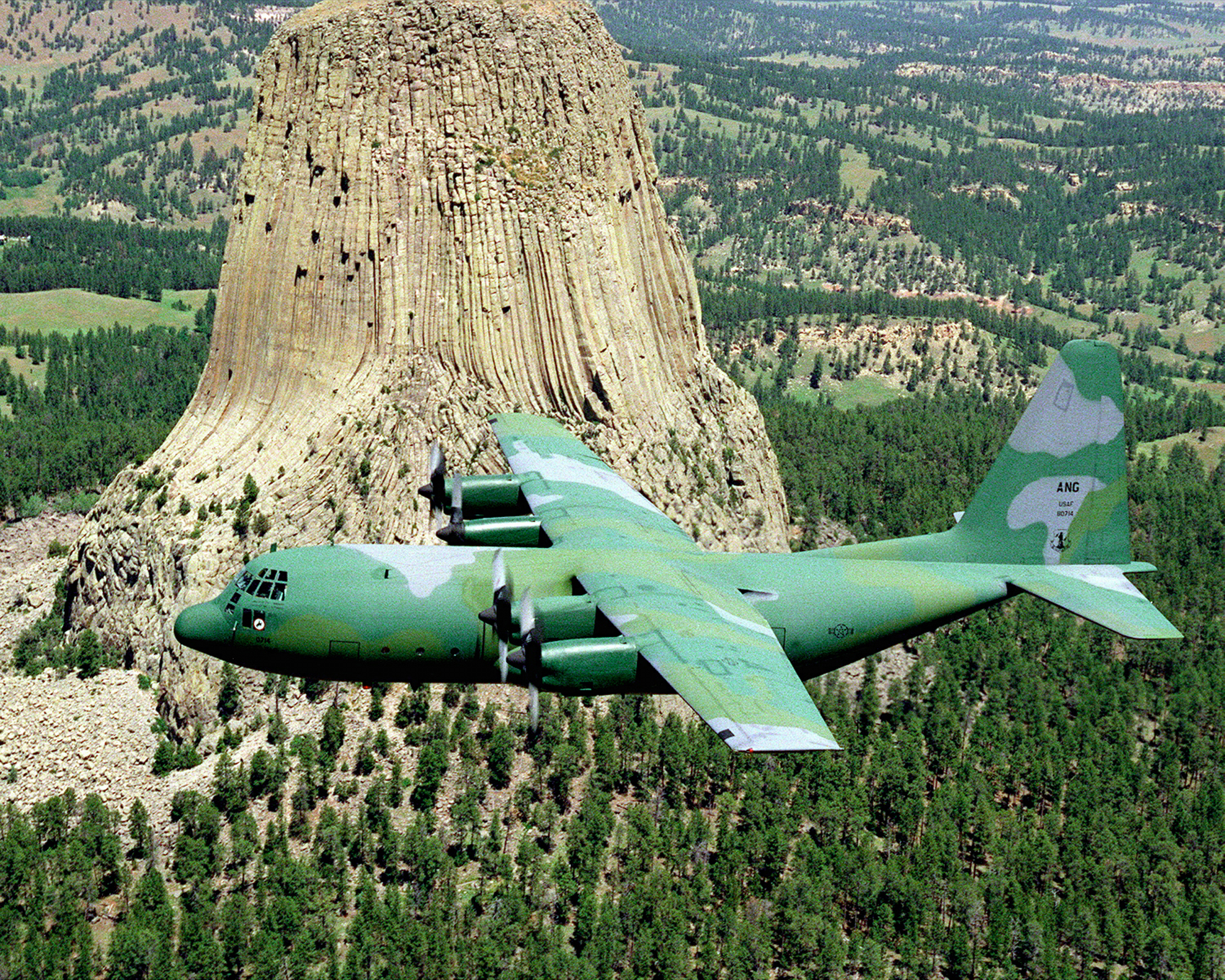
Lockheed C-130B Hercules 58-0714 flying past Devils Tower National Monument.

As a result of the Korean War, the 187th and its parent, the 140th Fighter Wing was federalized and brought to active duty on 1 April 1951. The unit was ordered to the new Clovis Air Force Base, New Mexico, which arrived in October 1951. The federalized 140th Fighter-Bomber Wing was a composite organization of activated Air National Guard units, composed of the 120th Fighter Squadron (Colorado ANG), the 190th Fighter Squadron (Utah ANG), and the 187th FS. The 140th and its components were equipped with F-51D Mustangs, and were redesignated as fighter-bomber squadrons on 12 April 1951.

During their period of federal service, many pilots were sent to Japan and South Korea to reinforce active-duty units. At Clovis, elements of the 140th FBW took part in Operation Tumbler-Snapper – 1952, a nuclear bomb test in Nevada. On 15 November 1952, the elements of the 140th returned to Air National Guard control in their respective states.

==== Cold War ====
Upon return to Wyoming state control, the 120th was re-equipped with F-80C Shooting Star jets. On 1 July 1955, the squadron was redesignated the 187th Fighter-Interceptor Squadron.

On 1 July 1957, the 187th was authorized to expand to a group level, and the 153d Fighter Group was established. The 187th ecoming the group's flying squadron. Other elements assigned into the group were the 153d headquarters, 153d Material Squadron (maintenance and supply), 153d Air Base Squadron, and the 153d USAF Dispensary. The 153d FIG being assigned to the 34th Air Division, Air Defense Command and upgraded to F-86L Sabre Interceptors.

=== Airlift mission ===
The most dramatic change came for the Wyoming unit in 1961 when it changed from an Air Defense Command Fighter-Interceptor unit to flying C-119 Flying Boxcars and airlifting medical patients, with the newly designated 187th Aeromedical Transport Squadron becoming part of Military Air Transport Service (MATS).

On 21 June 1963 the 187th received C-121 Super Constellation aircraft and expanded its military airlift role to worldwide mission capabilities. Entering the realm of Southeast Asia and the Vietnam War, the Wyoming Air Guard flew its first mission into the Southeast Asia theater combat zone in late 1964, and continued to do so throughout the Vietnam War years. In January 1966, the unit became the 153d Military Airlift Group [153d MAG], under the Military Airlift Command (MAC).

In 1972, the 187th received its first turboprop C-130B Hercules aircraft, and became a Tactical Airlift Squadron. The C-130 has proven to be one of the toughest and most versatile aircraft ever built, and which the unit continues to fly over 40 years later. In 1975, the Wyoming Air Guard was selected for the unique role of aerial fire fighting. Two Wyoming C-130s were equipped with Modular Airborne FireFighting System (MAFFS) and began water/fire retardant bombing of fires throughout the United States. Those fire fighting mission still continue through the present.

In the meantime, the 153d Tactical Airlift Group expanded to regularly flying missions with the US Southern Command out of Howard AFB, Panama, as part of Operation Phoenix Oak. From supplying embassies in Central and South America, to searching for sinking ships in the middle of tropical storms, the Wyoming C-130s and aircrews have carried out military and humanitarian missions, right up to the present day. Those missions continued through Operation Just Cause in 1989–90 when Panama was designated a combat zone.

Beginning 5 August 1990, the first day of Operation Desert Shield, and into Operation Desert Storm the Wyoming Air Guard flew continental U.S. and Central and South America missions. During that time, the Wyoming 187th Aeromedical Evacuation Flight and the 153d Clinic were both activated by order of the President of the United States, with a large number of those medical personnel being sent to Saudi Arabia. After the hostilities, Wyoming Guard members continued with Operation Provide Comfort, which supplied humanitarian aid to Kurdish people displaced by the Iraqi military.

=== Global war on terrorism ===
As the global war on terrorism expanded to include operations in Iraq and continued operations in Afghanistan, the 153rd Airlift Wing repeatedly answered the nation's call. In addition to its ongoing commitment to MAFFS, Operation Joint Forge in Europe, and Coronet Oak in Latin America, the 153 AW maintained a two-year-long, two-aircraft commitment to Operation Iraqi Freedom during 2004–2005.

In 2006 and 2007 the unit returned to Afghanistan for two and three aircraft Aerospace Expeditionary Force rotations. On the home front, the end of 2007 found four aircraft responding to the great 2007 California wildfires.

=== Lineage ===
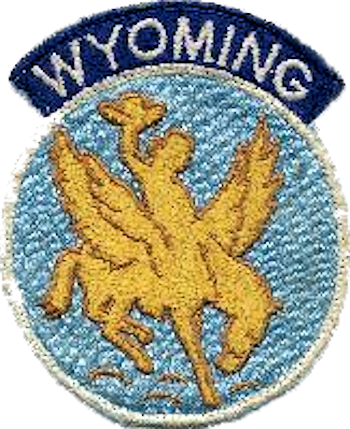
Legacy 87th Fighter-Interceptor Squadron Emblem, 1956

- Constituted 402d Fighter Squadron on 22 July 1943

Activated on 25 July 1943
Inactivated on 10 November 1945
Redesignated 187th Fighter Squadron and allotted to the National Guard on 24 May 1946
Extended federal recognition on 11 August 1946
Federalized and placed on active duty on 1 April 1951
Redesignated 187th Fighter-Bomber Squadron on 1 April 1951
Inactivated, released from active duty and returned to Wyoming state control on 1 December 1952
Redesignated 187th Fighter-Interceptor Squadron on 1 July 1955
Redesignated 187th Aeromedical Transport Squadron on 1 May 1961
Redesignated 187th Air Transport Squadron on 8 February 1964
Redesignated 187th Military Airlift Squadron on 8 January 1966
Redesignated 187th Tactical Airlift Squadron on 13 July 1972
Redesignated 187th Airlift Squadron on 15 March 1992

=== Assignments ===
- 370th Fighter Group, 25 July 1943 – 7 November 1945
- 86th Fighter Wing, 11 August 1946
- 140th Fighter Group (later 140th Fighter-Bomber Group), 3 September 1946 – 1 December 1952
- 140th Fighter-Bomber Group (later 140th Fighter-Interceptor Group), 1 December 1952
- 153d Fighter Group (later 153d Aeromedical Transport Group, 153d Air Transport Group, 153d Military Airlift Group, 153d Tactical Airlift Group, 153d Airlift Group), 1 July 1957
- 153d Operations Group, 1 October 1995 – present

=== Stations ===
- Westover Field, Massachusetts, 1 July 1943
- Groton Army Air Field, Connecticut, 19 October 1943
- Bradley Field, Connecticut, 5–20 January 1944
- RAF Aldermaston (AAF-467), England, 12 February 1944 467
- RAF Andover (AAF-406), England, 29 February – 19 July 1944 406
- Cardonville Airfield (A-3), France, 24 July 1944
- La Vieille Airfield (A-19), France, 15 August 1944
- Lonray Airfield (A-45), France, 6 September 1944
- Roye-Amy Airfield (A-73), France, 11 September 1944
- Florennes/Juzaine Airfield (A-78), Belgium 26 September 1944
- Ophoven Airfield (Y-32), Belgium 27 January 1945
- Gütersloh Airfield (Y-99), Germany 20 April 1945
- AAF Station Mannheim/Sandhofen, Germany. 27 June 1945
- AAF Station Fritzlar, Germany, 6 August–September 1945
- Camp Shanks, New York, c. 9–10 November 1945
- Cheyenne Municipal Airport, Wyoming, 11 August 1946
- Clovis Air Force Base, New Mexico, 12 April 1951
- Cheyenne Municipal Airport (later Cheyenne Air National Guard Base), Wyoming, 1 December 1952

=== Aircraft ===
- Lockheed P-38 Lightning, 1943–1945
- North American P-51D (later F-51) Mustang, 1945, 1946–1953
- Lockheed F-80C Shooting Star, 1953–1957
- North American F-86L Sabre, 1957–1961
- Fairchild C-119J Flying Boxcar, 1961–1963
- Lockheed C-121G Constellation, 1963–1972
- Lockheed C-130B Hercules, 1972–1994
- Lockheed C-130H Hercules, 1993–2028
- Lockheed Martin C-130J Super Hercules, 2028–
