= 173d Air Refueling Squadron =

Nebraska Air National Guard unit

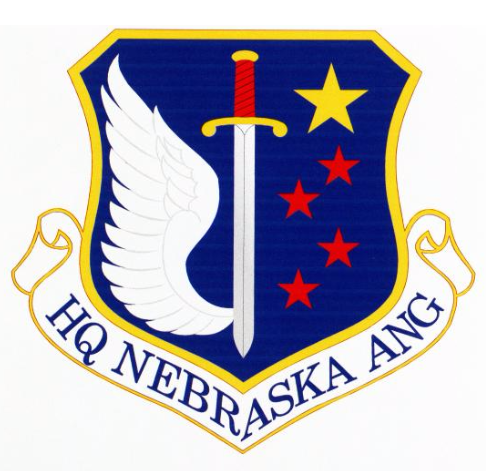
173d Air Refueling Squadron

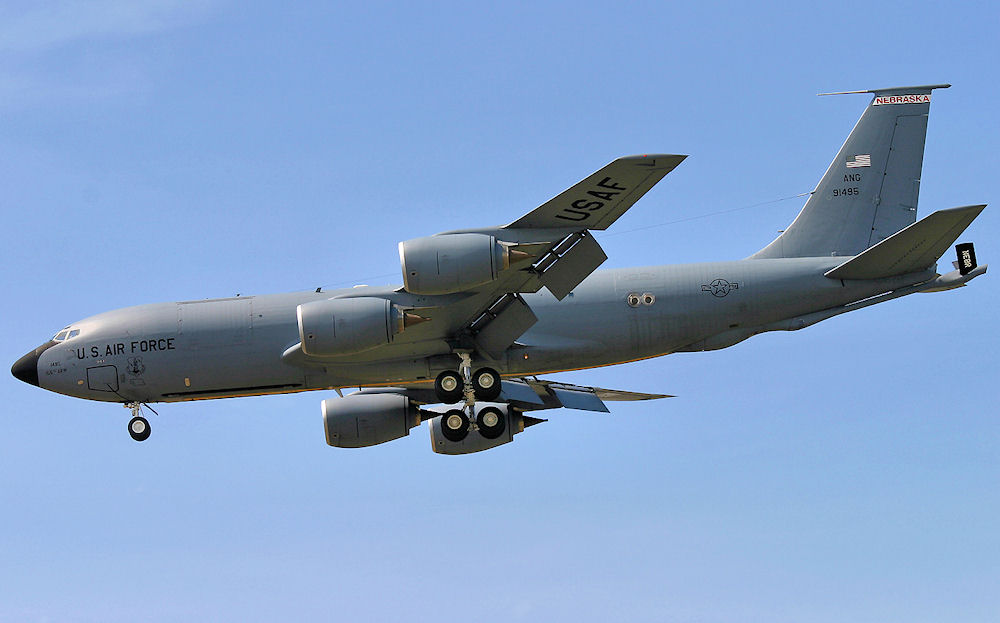
- 173d Air Refueling Squadron KC-135R Stratotanker (Note: Aircraft is Boeing KC-135R Stratotanker serial 59-1495.)
- Active: 1943–1945; 1946–1953; 1953–present
- Country: United States
- Allegiance: Nebraska
- Branch: Air National Guard
- Type: Squadron
- Role: Aerial refueling
- Part of: Nebraska Air National Guard
- Garrison/HQ: Lincoln Air National Guard Base, Nebraska
- Engagements: European Theater of Operations
- Decorations: Distinguished Unit Citation Belgian Fourragère

Insignia
- 173d Air Refueling Squadron emblem
- Tail stripe: White, "Nebraska" in red lettering

The 173d Air Refueling Squadron is a unit of the Nebraska Air National Guard 155th Air Refueling Wing. It is assigned to Lincoln Air National Guard Base, Nebraska and is equipped with the Boeing KC-135 Stratotanker.

== History ==
=== World War II ===
The 401st Fighter Squadron was established on 22 July 1943 at Westover Field, Massachusetts and equipped with P-47 Thunderbolts. Deployed to the European Theater of Operations and assigned to Ninth Air Force in England, it engaged in combat operations until May 1945. It returned to the United States during September–November 1945, and was inactivated on 7 November 1945.

=== Nebraska Air National Guard ===
The unit was allotted to the National Guard on 24 May 1946 and redesignated the 173rd Fighter Squadron, and was further allotted to the Nebraska Air National Guard. It was organized and federally recognized as a North American P-51D Mustang squadron in July 1946. It was the second Air National Guard unit established, and assigned to the Iowa ANG's 132d Fighter Group. It was posted to Lincoln Airport (later Lincoln Air Force Base), a former Second Air Force training field during World War II. With the long runways of the airport, the unit was able to upgrade to Lockheed P-80A Shooting Star jet aircraft in early 1948. In 1950, the unit became the first Air National Guard organization to win the Winston P. Wilson Trophy as the outstanding jet fighter unit for the year. It was the first of five Wilson trophies to be awarded to the Nebraska organization.

Activated to federal service during the Korean War, the unit was sent to Dow Air Force Bae, Maine. Used by TAC to train replacement pilots in F-51D Mustang ground support operations, some unit members also deployed to Japan and Korea to fly combat missions. The 132d, still with F-51s, was moved to Alexandria Air Force Base, Louisiana in May 1952, replacing the Oklahoma ANG 137th Fighter-Bomber Wing which was deployed to France. The unit performed training as a tactical fighter unit until relieved from active service and returning to Nebraska ANG jurisdiction in January 1953.

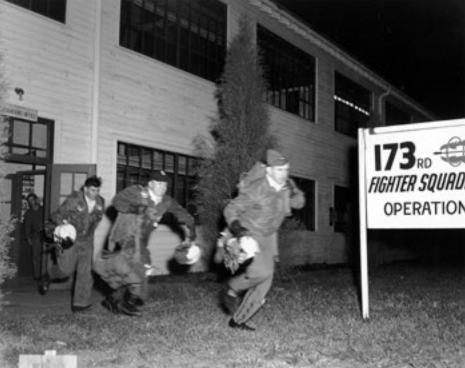
Pilots from the 173rd Fighter Squadron running to their planes during a practice alert at Lincoln Air Force Base

Upon returning to Lincoln, the squadron was forced to share facilities with the new Strategic Air Command provisional 4120th Air Base Group and extensive construction enlarging the airport to support SAC bombers as Lincoln Air Force Base. In late 1953, the unit re-equipped with more-advanced Lockheed F-80C Shooting Star jets and the 173d was re-designated as a Fighter-Interceptor squadron, with the Air Defense Command (ADC) becoming the gaining organization. Its new mission was the air defense of Nebraska and specifically the air defense of the new SAC facility, which was programmed to receive the Air Force's new B-47 Stratojet intercontinental jet bomber in 1954.

In 1955 the 173d was authorized new facilities. A new site was located south of the commercial air terminal adjoining the Air Force base and the unit moved to its new facilities in the fall of 1956. Two years later, the unit moved into a vacated Naval Air Reserve hangar and turned its "old" hangar over to the Nebraska Army National Guard. Since that time, additional facilities were built on the 166 acres (0.67 km2) of the Lincoln Air National Guard Base. Army aviation and other Army units remain tenants today.

The 173d transitioned to North American F-86D Sabre interceptors in 1957, and upgraded to the modified F-86L in 1959 which could be computer-guided by the ground-based Semi Automatic Ground Environment system to intercept targeted unknown aircraft. In 1960, ADC decided to expand the organization to group size, activating the 155th Fighter Group at Lincoln on 1 July, with jurisdiction of the 173d being transferred from the 132d Fighter Group to the new 155th Group.

The unit remained under ADC until 1964 with the planned retirement of the B-47. The unit then received Republic RF-84F Thunderflash photo-reconnaissance aircraft and became a Tactical Air Command reconnaissance squadron. In January 1965, SAC's 307th Bomb Wing began drawdown operations at Lincoln AFB, and the base was closed on 6 June 1966 and returned to civilian control with a co-located Air National Guard Base.

The 173d was upgraded to the McDonnell RF-4C Phantom II in 1972, and operated as a tactical reconnaissance squadron until 1993. With the retirement of the Phantom in the early 1990s and the end of the Cold War, the unit was reorganized into the 173d Air Refueling Squadron, flying Boeing KC-135R Stratotankers and being subordinated to the Air Mobility Command.

=== Lineage ===
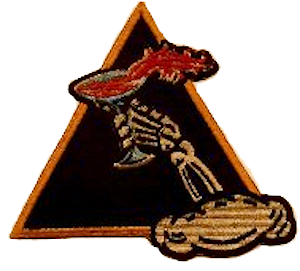
Legacy World War II 401st Fighter Squadron emblem

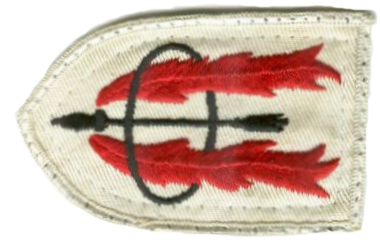
173d Fighter-Interceptor Squadron – Emblem

- Constituted as the 401st Fighter Squadron on 22 July 1943

Activated on 25 July 1943
Inactivated on 10 November 1945
Redesignated 173d Fighter Squadron, Single Engine and allotted to the National Guard on 24 May 1946.
Extended federal recognition on 26 July 1946
Redesignated 173d Fighter Squadron, Jet in Spring 1948
Ordered into active service on 1 April 1951
Inactivated, relieved from active duty and returned to Nebraska ANG, on 1 January 1953
Redesignated 173d Fighter-Bomber Squadron on 1 January 1953
Redesignated 173d Fighter-Interceptor Squadron in Fall 1953
Redesignated 173d Tactical Reconnaissance Squadron on 1 May 1964
Redesignated 173d Reconnaissance Squadron on 15 March 1992
Redesignated 173d Air Refueling Squadron on 1 October 1995

=== Assignments ===
- 370th Fighter Group, 25 July 1943 – 7 November 1945
- 132d Fighter Group (later 132d Fighter-Bomber Group), 26 July 1946 – 1 January 1953
- 132d Fighter-Bomber Group (later 132d Fighter-Interceptor Group), 1 January 1953
- 155th Fighter Group (later 155th Tactical Reconnaissance Group, 155th Reconnaissance Group, 155th Air Refueling Group), 1 July 1960
- 155th Operations Group, 1 Oct 1995–present

=== Stations ===
- Westover Field, Massachusetts, 1 July 1943
- Groton Army Air Field, Connecticut, 19 October 1943
- Bradley Field, Connecticut, 5–20 January 1944
- RAF Aldermaston (AAF-467), England, 12 February 1944 467
- RAF Andover (AAF-406), England, 29 February – 19 July 1944 406
- Cardonville Airfield (A-3), France, 24 July 1944
- La Vieille Airfield (A-19), France, 15 August 1944
- Lonray Airfield (A-45), France, 6 September 1944
- Roye-Amy Airfield (A-73), France, 11 September 1944
- Florennes/Juzaine Airfield (A-78), Belgium 26 September 1944
- Ophoven Airfield (Y-32), Belgium 27 January 1945
- Gütersloh Airfield (Y-99), Germany 20 April 1945
- AAF Station Mannheim/Sandhofen, Germany. 27 June 1945
- AAF Station Fritzlar, Germany, 6 August–September 1945
- Camp Miles Standish, Massachusetts, 6–7 November 1945
- Lincoln Army Air Field (later Lincoln Municipal Airport), Nebraska, 26 July 1946 – Present
- Dow Air Force Base, Maine, Spring, 1 April 1951
- Alexandria Air Force Base, Louisiana, 5 November 1952 – 1 January 1953
- Lincoln Air Force Base (later Nebraska Air National Guard Base), Nebraska, 1 January 1953 – present

=== Aircraft ===
- P-38 Lightning, 1943–1945
- P-51D (later F-51) Mustang, 1945, 1946–1948, 1951–1953
- F-80C Shooting Star, 1948–1951, 1953–1957
- F-86D Sabre, 1957–1959
- F-86L Sabre, 1959–1964
- RF-84F Thunderstreak, 1964–1972
- RF-4C Phantom II, 1972–1993
- KC-135R Stratotanker, 1993–Present
