= 485th Fighter Squadron =

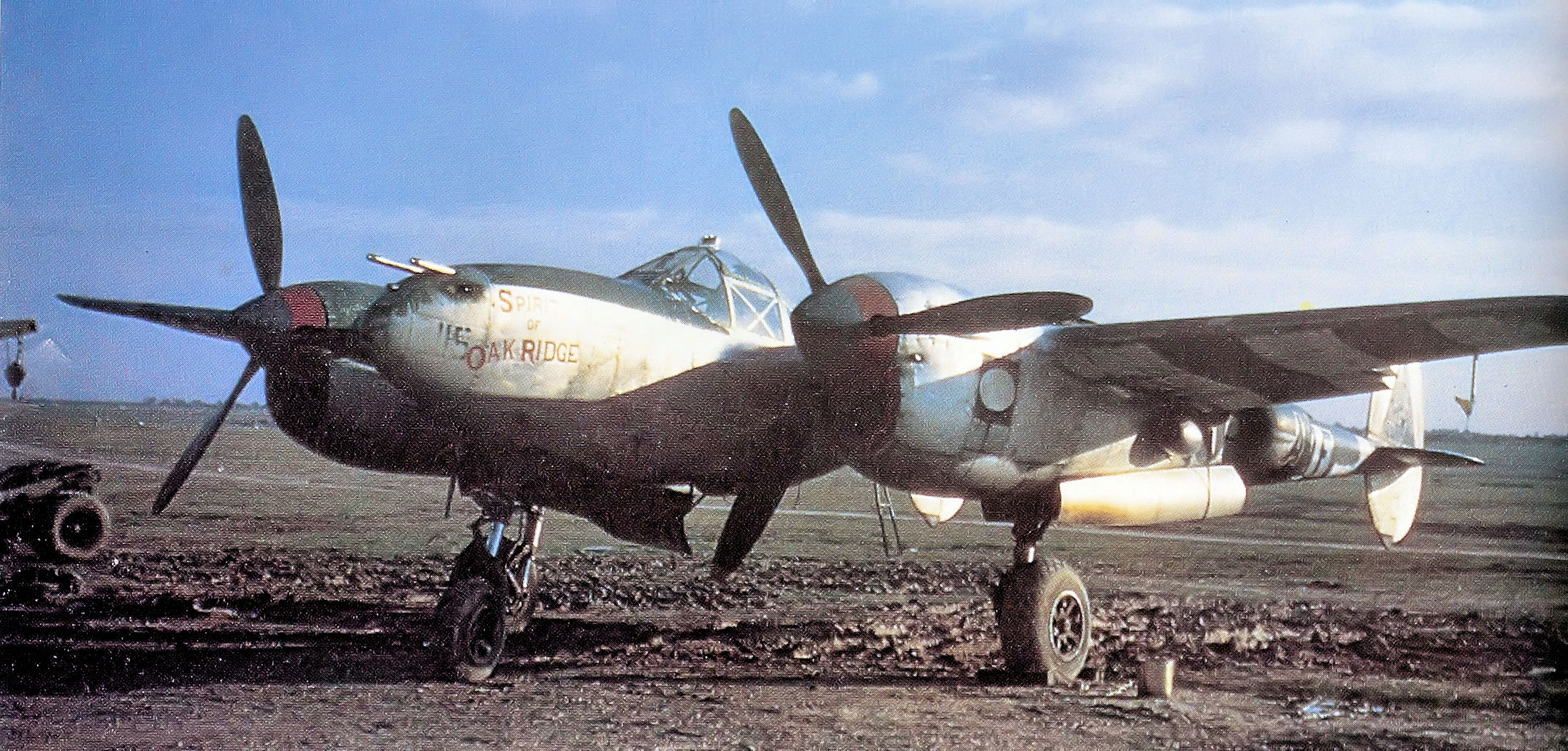
- Squadron P-38 Lightning, Spirit of Oak Ridge at Lonray Airfield, France in, October 1944
- Active: 1943–1945
- Country: United States
- Branch: United States Air Force
- Role: Fighter
- Engagements: European Theater of Operations
- Decorations: Distinguished Unit Citation Belgian Fourragère

Insignia
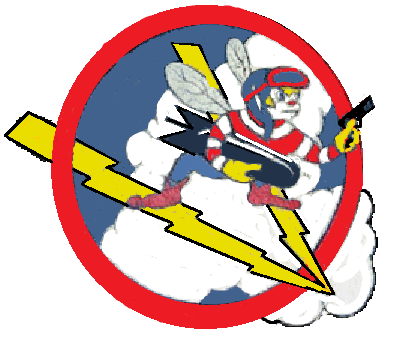
- 485th Fighter Squadron emblem (Note: Approved 20 March 1945. Description: On a disc light turquoise blue, wide border red, a small, caricatured lightning bug wearing red-and-white striped jersey, light turquoise blue trousers and aviator's helmet, red boots and goggles, standing on two, jagged, lightning bolts striking toward sinister base, pilewise, and holding a large gray aerial bomb under the right arm, and a gray automatic revolver in the left hand, while facing toward sinister all in front of a large white cloud formation.)

The 485th Fighter Squadron is an inactive United States Air Force unit. Its last was assigned to the 370th Fighter Group, Ninth Air Force, stationed at Camp Shanks, New York. It was inactivated on 10 November 1945.

== History ==
Established in mid-1943 at Westover Field, Massachusetts, equipped with Republic P-47 Thunderbolts. Trained under I Fighter Command in New England, being deployed to the European Theater of Operations (ETO), and assigned to Ninth Air Force in England. Was converted from P-47s to Lockheed P-38 Lightnings upon arrival in the ETO.

From British airfields the squadron flew sweeps over Occupied France, attacking radar installations and flak towers, and escorted bombers that attacked bridges and marshalling yards in France as the Allies prepared for the invasion of the Continent. The group provided cover for Allied forces that crossed the Channel on 6 June 1944, and flew armed reconnaissance missions over the Cotentin Peninsula until the end of the month. On 17 July 1944, napalm incendiary bombs were dropped for the first time in war on a fuel depot at Coutances, near St. Lô, France.

After the D-Day invasion, squadron moved to its Advanced Landing Ground (ALG) at Cardonville Airfield, France on 20 July to support the Allied ground advance across France and into Germany. Flew armed reconnaissance during the Battle of the Bulge, attacking warehouses, highways, railroads, motor transports, and other targets.

Converted to North American P-51 Mustangs during February – March 1945. Bombed bridges and docks in the vicinity of Wesel to prepare for the crossing of the Rhine, and patrolled the area as paratroops were dropped on the east bank on 24 March Supported operations of 2d Armored Division in the Ruhr Valley in Apr. Flew last mission, a sweep over Dessau and Wittenberg, on 4 May 1945.

Returned to the United States during September–November 1945, and was inactivated on 7 November 1945.

== Lineage ==
- Constituted as the 485th Fighter Squadron on 22 July 1943

Activated on 25 July 1943
Inactivated on 10 November 1945

=== Assignments ===
- 370th Fighter Group, 25 July 1943 – 7 November 1945

=== Stations ===
- Westover Field, Massachusetts, 1 July 1943
- Groton Army Air Field, Connecticut, 19 October 1943
- Bradley Field, Connecticut, 5–20 January 1944
- RAF Aldermaston (AAF-467), England, 12 February 1944 467
- RAF Andover (AAF-406), England, 29 February – 19 July 1944 406
- Cardonville Airfield (A-3), France, 24 July 1944
- La Vieille Airfield (A-19), France, 15 August 1944
- Lonray Airfield (A-45), France, 6 September 1944
- Roye-Amy Airfield (A-73), France, 11 September 1944
- Florennes/Juzaine Airfield (A-78), Belgium 26 September 1944
- Ophoven Airfield (Y-32), Belgium 27 January 1945
- Gütersloh Airfield (Y-99), Germany 20 April 1945
- AAF Station Mannheim/Sandhofen, Germany. 27 June 1945
- AAF Station Fritzlar, Germany, 6 August–September 1945
- Camp Shanks, New York, c. 9–10 November 1945

=== Aircraft ===
- Republic P-47 Thunderbolt, 1943–1944
- Lockheed P-38 Lightning, 1943–1945
- North American P-51 Mustang, 1945
