= Cardonville =

- Commune
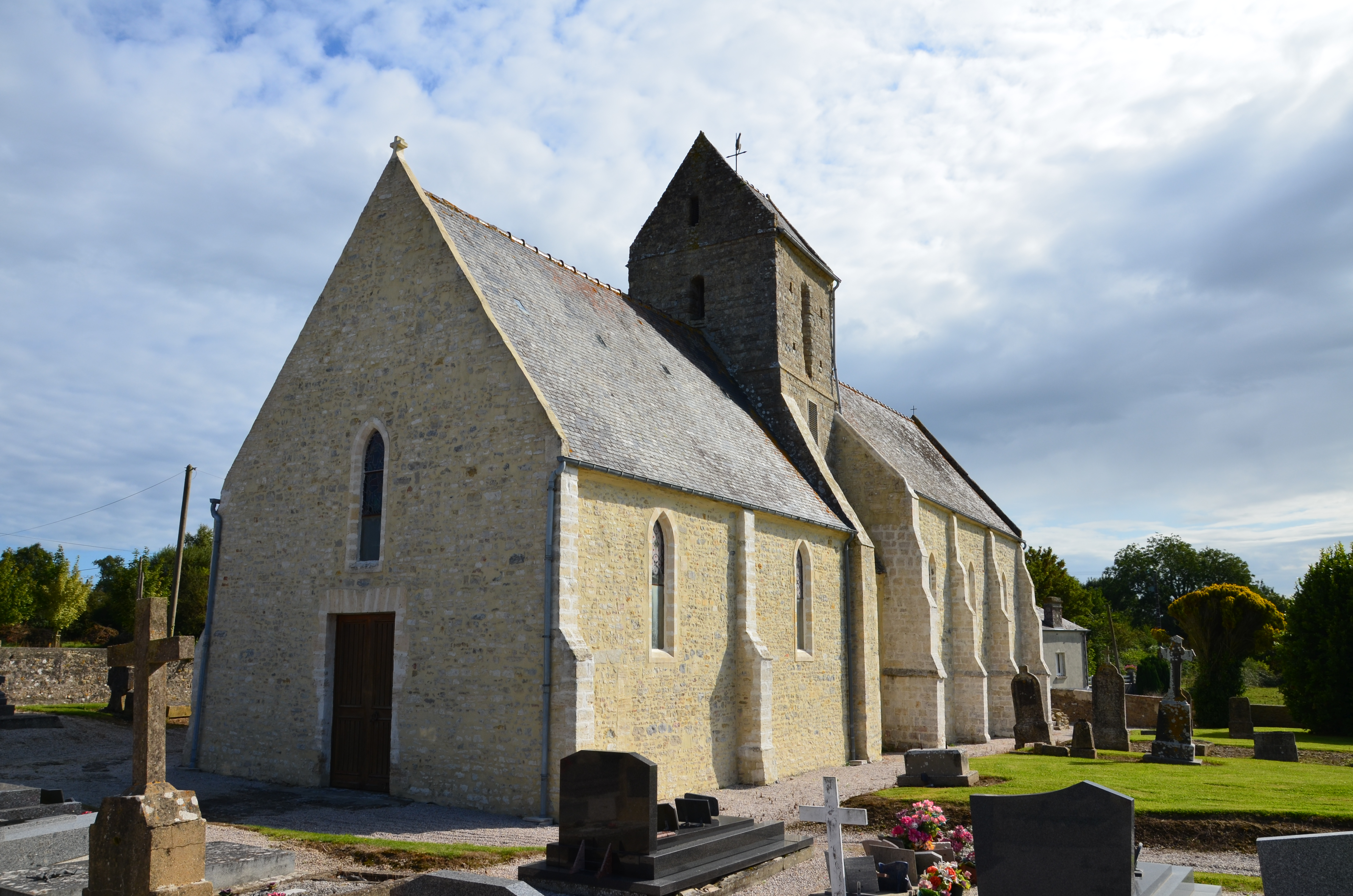
- The church in Cardonville
- Location of Cardonville
- Location within France Location within Normandy
- Coordinates: 49°20′42″N 1°03′52″W
- Country: France
- Region: Normandy
- Department: Calvados
- Arrondissement: Bayeux
- Canton: Trévières
- Intercommunality: CC Isigny-Omaha Intercom

Government
  - Mayor (2020–2026): Noémi Hebert
- Area^{1}: 3.29 km^{2} (1.27 sq mi)
- Elevation: 25 m (82 ft)
- Highest elevation: 38 m (125 ft)
- Lowest elevation: 13 m (43 ft)
- Population (2023): 90
  - Density: 27/km^{2} (71/sq mi)
- Time zone: UTC+01:00 (CET)
  - Summer (DST): UTC+02:00 (CEST)
- INSEE/Postal code: 14136 /14230
- ^{1} French Land Register data, which excludes lakes, ponds, glaciers > 1 km^{2} (0.386 sq mi or 247 acres) and river estuaries.

Cardonville (French pronunciation: [kaʁdɔ̃vil]) is a commune in the Calvados department and Normandy region of north-western France.

== History ==
=== World War II ===
After the liberation of the area by Allied Forces in early June 1944, engineers of the Ninth Air Force IX Engineering Command began construction of a combat Advanced Landing Ground outside of the town. Declared operational on 14 June, the airfield was designated as "A-3", it was used by the 368th Fighter Group which flew P-47 Thunderbolts until the end of August when the unit moved into Central France. Along with the 368th, the 370th Fighter Group flew P-38 Lightnings from the airfield until mid-August. With the combat units moved out, the airfield was closed.

== Population ==
Historical population
Year	Pop.	±% p.a.
1968	82	—
1975	79	−0.53%
1982	66	−2.54%
1990	62	−0.78%
1999	78	+2.58%
2007	103	+3.54%
2012	103	+0.00%
2017	112	+1.69%
2023	90	−3.58%
Source: INSEE

== See also ==
- Communes of the Calvados department
