= Cardonville Airfield =

World War II military airfield

Cardonville Airfield Advanced Landing Ground (ALG) A-3
- Calvados, Basse-Normandie Region, France
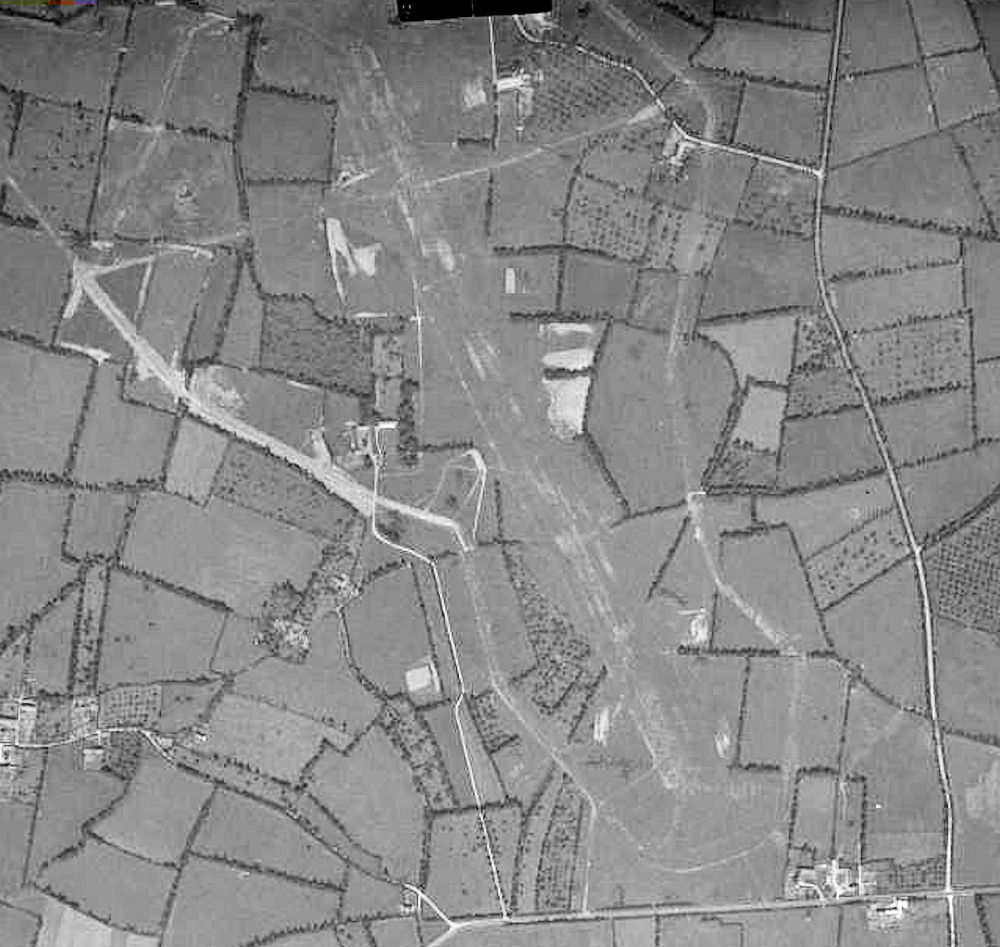
- Cardonville Airfield A-3

Site information
- Type: Military Airfield
- Controlled by: United States Army Air Forces

Location
- Coordinates: 49°21′04″N 001°03′09″W

Site history
- Built by: IX Engineering Command
- In use: June–September 1944
- Materials: Square-Mesh Track (SMT)
- Battles/wars: World War II - EAME Theater: Normandy Campaign; Northern France Campaign

Garrison information
- Garrison: Ninth Air Force
- Occupants: 368th Fighter Group; 370th Fighter Group

Airfield information
Runways
Direction	Length and surface
15/33	5,000 feet (1,520 m) SMT/PSP
- One runway, 4 alert pads, 50 hardstands

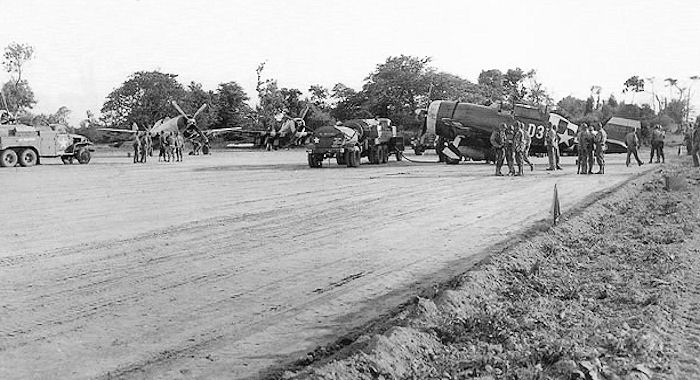
P-47 Thunderbolts of the 368th Fighter Group, Cardonville Airfield (A-3) France, Summer 1944.

Cardonville Airfield is an abandoned World War II military airfield located near the commune of Cardonville in the Normandy region of northern France.

Located just outside Cardonville, the United States Army Air Force established a temporary airfield on 10 June 1944, shortly after the Allied landings in France. The airfield was one of the first established in the liberated area of Normandy, being constructed by the IX Engineering Command, 816th Engineer Aviation Battalion.

== History ==
Known as Advanced Landing Ground "A-3", the airfield consisted of a single 5000' (1500m) Square-Mesh Track runway aligned 15/33.

Tents were used for billeting and for support facilities; an access road was built to the existing road infrastructure; a dump for supplies, ammunition, and gasoline drums, along with a drinkable water and minimal electrical grid for communications and station lighting.

The fighter planes flew support missions during the Allied invasion of Normandy, patrolling roads in front of the beachhead, attacking German military vehicles, gun emplacements, anti-aircraft artillery and concentrations of German troops in Normandy and Brittany.

After the Americans moved east into Central France with the advancing Allied Armies, the airfield was left un-garrisoned and used for resupply and casualty evacuation. It was closed on 1 September 1944.

== Major units assigned ==
- 368th Fighter Group 20 June - 23 August 1944

395th (A7), 396th (C2), 397th (D3) Fighter Squadrons (P-47D)

- 370th Fighter Group 24 July - 15 August 1944

401st (9D), 402d (E6), 485th (7F) Fighter Squadrons (P-38)

== Current use ==
After its closure by the Americans, the airfield was dismantled in September 1944 and the land returned to agricultural use. Today the airfield is a mixture of various agricultural fields.

A memorial to the men and units that were stationed at Cardonville was placed near the site of the former airfield. It is located in North East Cardonville at the crossroads of the D199A and D199

== See also ==
- Advanced Landing Ground
