= 370th Fighter Group =

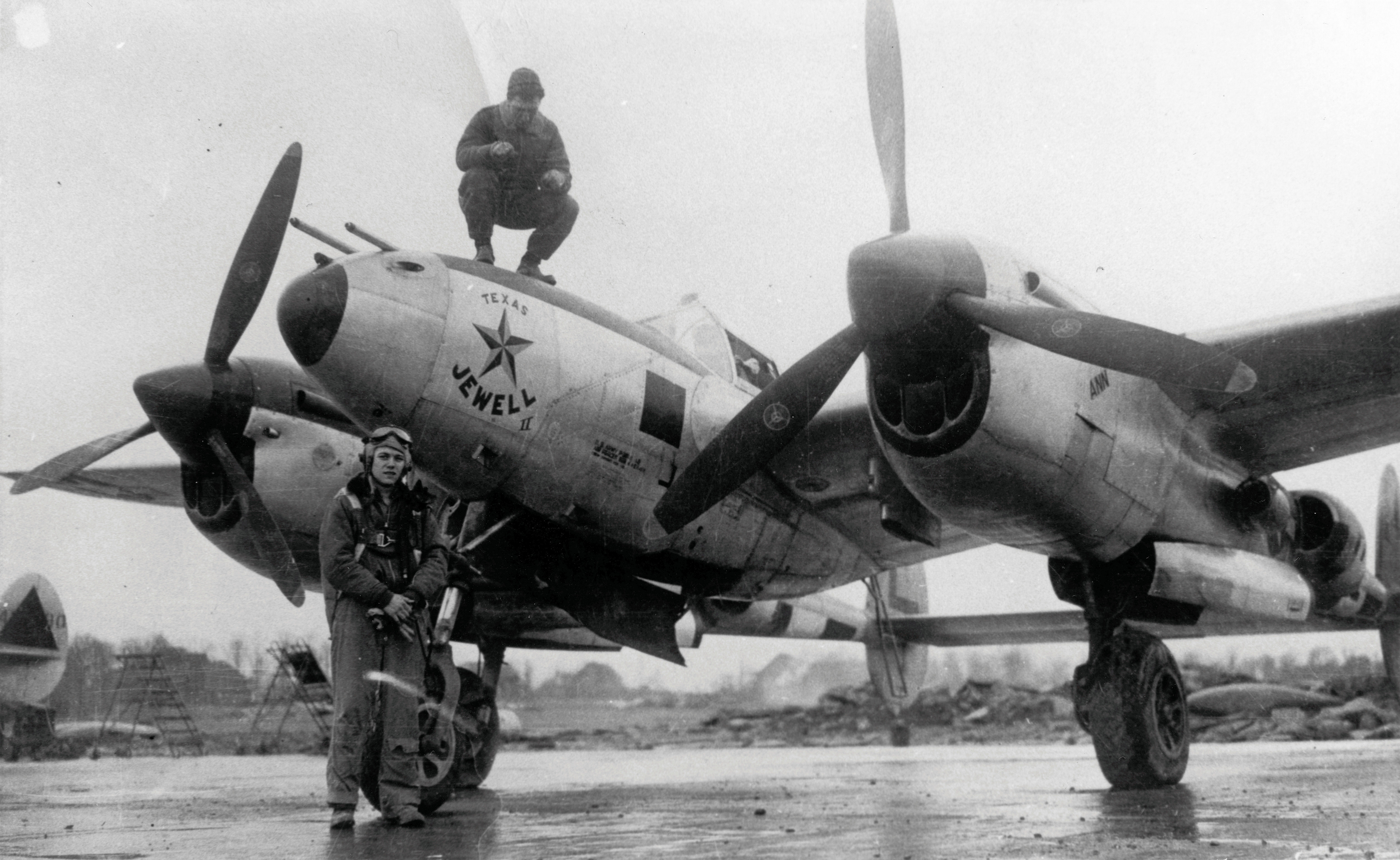
- 370th Fighter Group P-38 Lightning Texas Jewell II
- Country: United States
- Branch: United States Army Air Forces
- Motto(s): Militat quasi tigris quisque
- Engagements: Air Offensive, Europe; Normandy; Northern France; Rhineland; Ardennes-Alsace; Central Europe
- Decorations: Distinguished Unit Citation; Belgian fourragère

Commanders
- Notable commanders: Seth J. McKee

Insignia
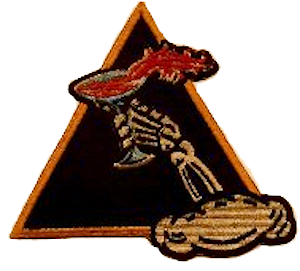
- 401st Fighter Squadron

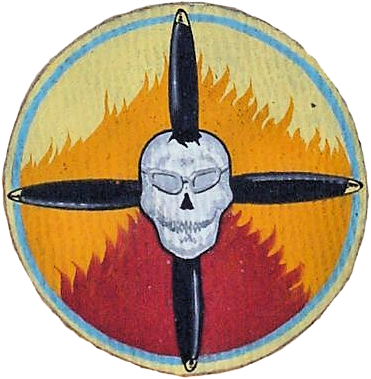
- 402nd Fighter Squadron

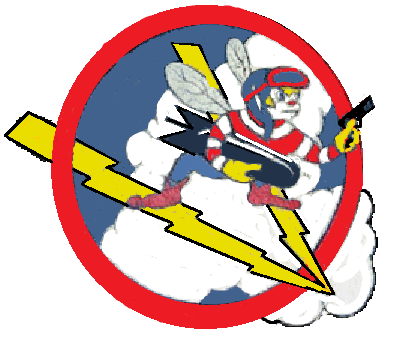
- 485th Fighter Squadron

Aircraft flown
- Fighter: P-38 Lightning 1943-45; P-51 Mustang 1945

The 370th Fighter Group was a unit of the Ninth Air Force that was located in the European Theater of Operations during World War II.

== Activation and training ==
The group was constituted as 370th Fighter Group on 25 May 1943 and activated on 1 Jul 1943. The group trained with Republic P-47 Thunderbolt aircraft at Westover Field, Massachusetts. They moved to Groton Army Air Field, Connecticut in October 1943 and then to Bradley Field in January 1944.

== Move to England ==
The group moved to RAF Aldermaston in England in January and February 1944 and were assigned to the Ninth Air Force. They moved to RAF Andover at the end of February and remained there until July 1944

They were equipped with Lockheed P-38 Lightning aircraft in February and trained until May 1944 when the group entered combat.

Their missions consisted of dive-bombing radar installations and flak towers, and escorted bombers for attacks on bridges and marshalling yards in France as the Allies prepared for the invasion of Normandy.

== D-Day invasion ==
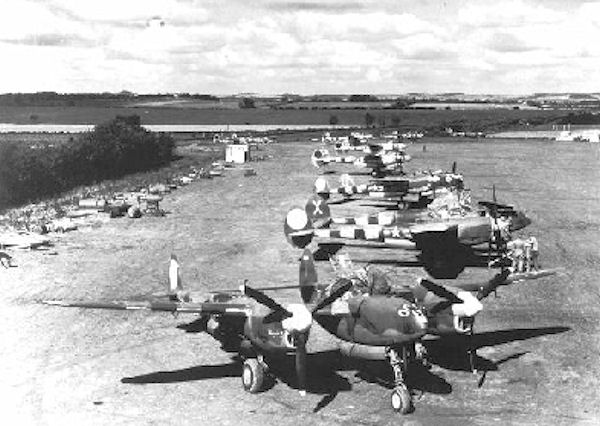
P-38s of the 370th Fighter Group at RAF Andover, June 1944

The group provided cover for Allied forces that crossed the Channel on 6 Jun 1944 for the Normandy landings. They flew armed reconnaissance missions over the Cotentin Peninsula until the end of the month.

The group moved to the Cardonville, France, on 24 Jul 1944 to support the drive of ground forces across France and into Germany.

They attacked gun emplacements, troops, supply dumps, and tanks during the Battle of Saint-Lô in July 1944 and the Falaise Pocket in the Falaise-Argentan area in August 1944. The group moved to La Vieille Airfield, France, on 15 August 1944.

== Airborne assault on Holland ==
The group sent planes and pilots to England to provide cover for the Operation Market Garden airborne assault on Holland in September 1944. The group struck pillboxes and troops early in October 1944 to support the First Army during the Battle of Aachen, and afterward struck railroads, bridges, viaducts, and tunnels in that area.

The group moved to Lonrai, France, 6 September 1944; Roye-Amy Airfield on 11 September 1944 and Florennes Air Base, Belgium, 26 September 1944.

A Distinguished Unit Citation was awarded to the group for a mission in support of ground forces in the Hurtgen Forest area on 2 Dec 1944. Despite bad weather and barrages of antiaircraft and small-arms fire, the group dropped napalm bombs on a heavily defended position in Bergstein, setting fire to the village and inflicting heavy casualties on enemy troops defending the area.

== Battle of the Bulge ==
The group flew armed reconnaissance during the Battle of the Bulge, December 1944-January 1945, attacking warehouses, highways, railroads, motor transports, and other targets. The group converted to North American P-51 Mustang aircraft starting in February 1945. The group moved to Zwartberg, Belgium, 27 January 1945.

== Crossing of the Rhine ==
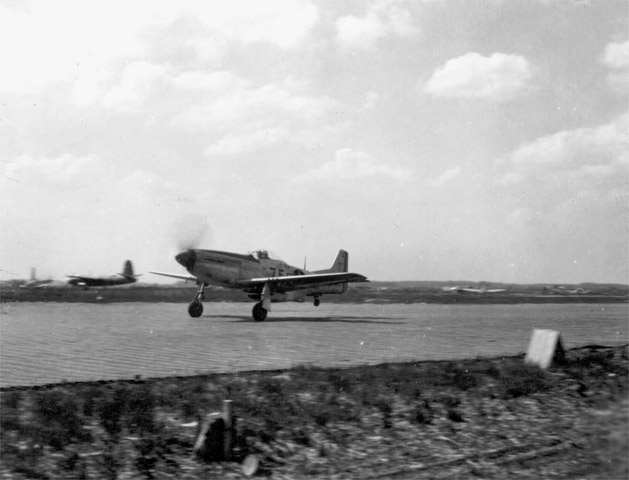
P-51D Mustang of the 485th Fighter Squadron

The group bombed bridges and docks in the vicinity of Wesel to prepare for the crossing of the Rhine, and patrolled the area as paratroops were dropped on the east bank on 24 March 1945. They supported operations of 2nd Armored Division in the Ruhr Valley in April 1945.

The group was stationed in Gutersloh, Germany, 20 April 1945. Their last mission was a sweep over Dessau and Wittenberg on 4 May 1945.

After Victory in Europe Day, the group moved to Sandhofen, Germany, 27 June 1945 and Fritzlar, Germany, from 6 August until September 1945.

== Return to the United States ==
The group returned to Camp Myles Standish in the United States between September and November 1945. The 370th Fighter Group was inactivated on 7 Nov 1945.

The group was allotted to Colorado Air National Guard and redesignated the 140th Fighter Group on 24 May 1945.
