= Lonray Airfield =

Lonray Airfield Advanced Landing Ground (ALG) A-45

- Basse-Normandie Region, France Lonray Airfield (France)

Site information
- Type: Military airfield

Location
- Coordinates: 48°27′36″N 000°02′22″E

Site history
- Built by: IX Engineering Command
- In use: September–November 1944
- Materials: Prefabricated Hessian Surfacing (PHS)
- Battles/wars: Western Front (World War II); Eastern France/Benelux Campaign

Lonray Airfield is an abandoned World War II military airfield, which is located near the commune of Lonrai in the Orne region of northern France.

Located just outside Lonrai, the United States Army Air Force established a temporary airfield on 22 August 1944, after the Allied landings in France and the breakout from Normandy, and during the Liberation of Paris. The airfield was constructed by the IX Engineering Command, 850th Engineer Aviation, Battalion using German facilities.

== History ==
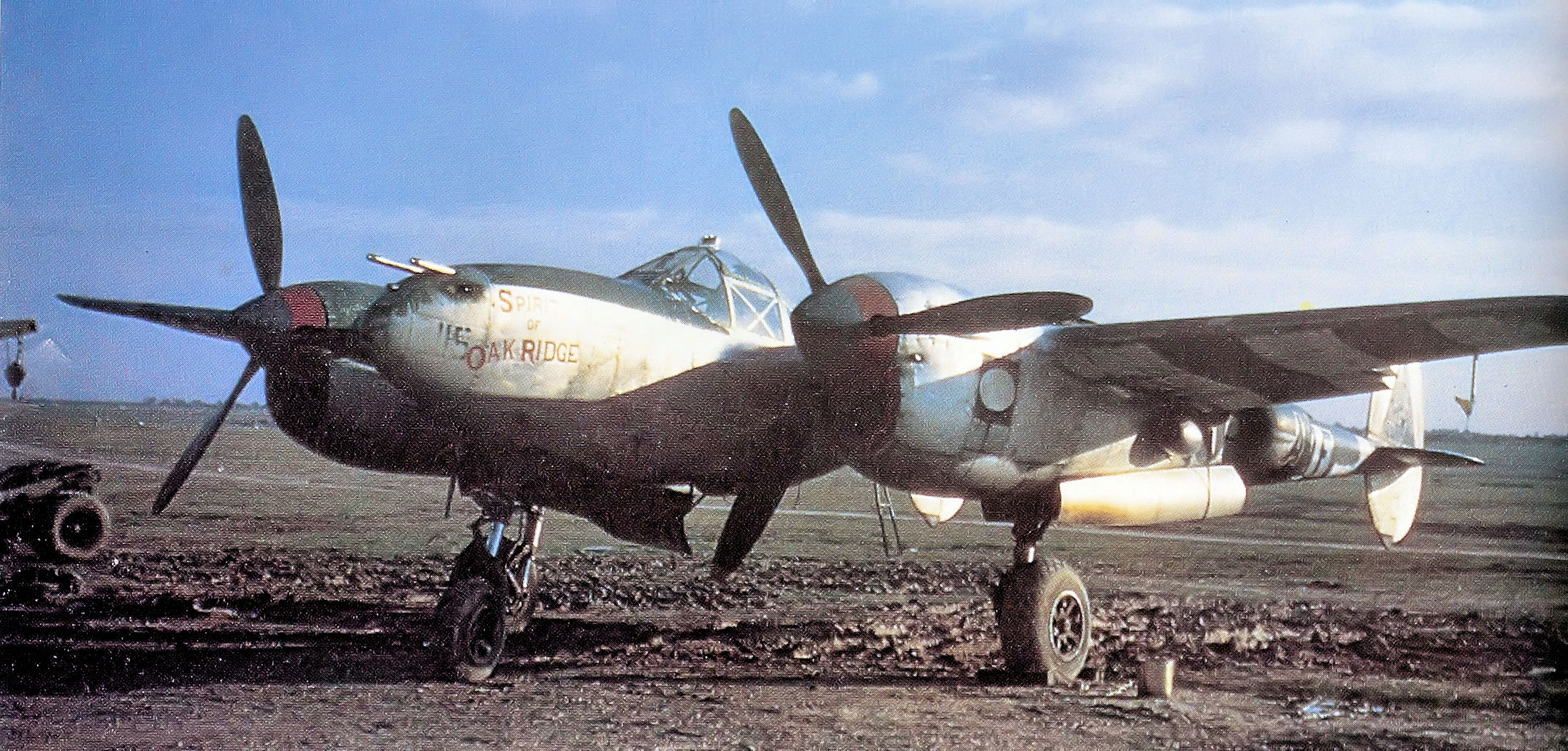
370th Fighter Group P-38 Lightning, "Spirit of Oak Ridge", 485th Fighter Squadron, at Lonray Airfield (A-45), France, October 1944

During the Second World War, from April 1944, the Germans developed an airfield, located on the town and that of Colombiers, neighboring town. To do this several hundred men had been requisitioned, within the framework of the Compulsory Labor Service. The ground was operational from June 12 to August 9, 1944 (three days before the liberation of the sector by the 2nd French Armor Division of General Leclerc).

Known as Advanced Landing Ground "A-45", the airfield consisted of a single 5000' (1500m) Prefabricated Hessian Surfacing runway aligned 05/23. In addition, tents were used for billeting and also for support facilities; an access road was built to the existing road infrastructure; a dump for supplies, ammunition, and gasoline drums, along with a drinkable water and minimal electrical grid for communications and station lighting.

The 370th Fighter Group, based P-47 Thunderbolt fighters at Saint Marceau from 4 to 8 September 1944. The 370th was replaced by the 439th Troop Carrier Group, which flew C-47 Skytrains from the airfield from 5 October until 7 November 1944

The fighter planes flew support missions during the Allied invasion of France, patrolling roads, strafing German military vehicles, and dropping bombs on gun emplacements, anti-aircraft artillery and concentrations of German troops when spotted.

After the Americans moved east into Central France with the advancing Allied Armies, the airfield was closed on 20 November 1944. Today the long dismantled airfield is indistinguishable from the agricultural fields in the area.

== See also ==
- Advanced Landing Ground
