= Fritzlar Air Base =

Army air base in Germany

Fritzlar Air Base Heeresflugplatz Fritzlar Advanced Landing Ground Y-86

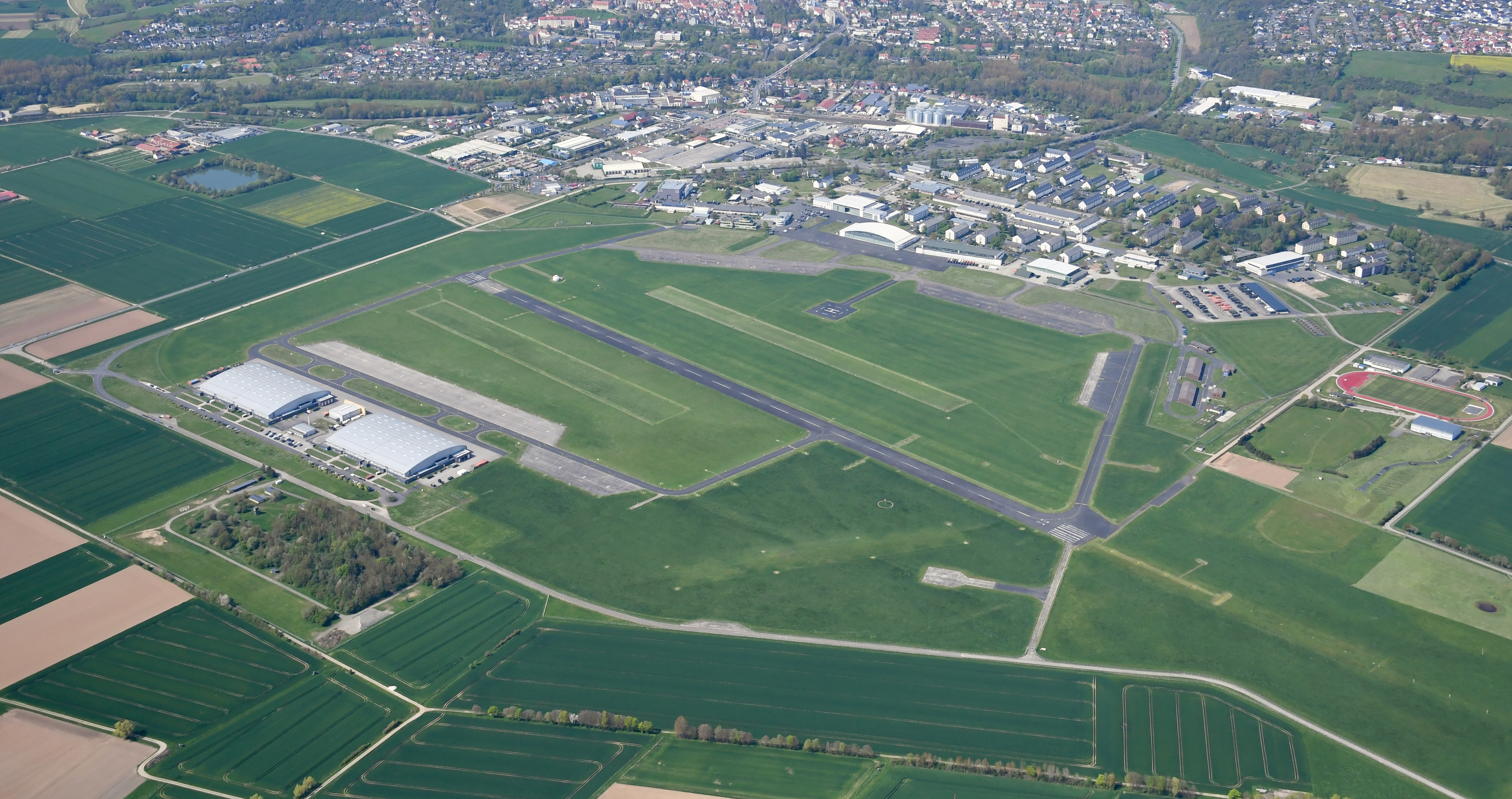
- IATA: FRZ; ICAO: ETHF

Summary
- Airport type: Military
- Owner: Federal Republic of Germany
- Operator: German Army
- Location: Fritzlar, Germany
- Built: 1935–1939
- In use: 1939-today
- Commander: Oberst Krass
- Occupants: 1939–1945 Luftwaffe, 1941–1944 Junkers, 1945–1947 USAAF, 1947–1951 US Army, 1951–1956 French Army, 1956-today German Army
- Elevation AMSL: 566 ft / 171 m
- Coordinates: 51°07′00″N 009°17′14″E
- Interactive map of Fritzlar Air Base

Runways
Direction	Length		Surface
Direction	m	ft	Surface
12/30	1,043	3,422	Asphalt

Fritzlar Air Base (German: Heeresflugplatz Fritzlar, IATA: FRZ, ICAO: ETHF) is a military air field of the German Army Aviation Corps. It is located near the town of Fritzlar in northern Hesse, Germany. The airfield is part of the Georg-Friedrich-Kaserne (Georg-Friedrich-Barracks).

Fritzlar is the home of Kampfhubschrauberregiment 36 "Kurhessen" (Attack Helicopter Regiment 36 "Kurhessen"), which is flying the MBB Bo 105 in anti-tank (PAH-1 & PAH-1A1) and light transport (VBH) version. Currently the PAH version is going to be replaced by the Eurocopter Tiger. Replacement was to be finished in 2012 but is much delayed.

== History ==
Construction of the airfield began in September 1935, although the Treaty of Versailles prohibited Germany to have an air force. The roofing ceremony was held on 17 September 1937.

=== Luftwaffe use ===
On 14/16 March 1939, the Staff and the first Group of the Kampfgeschwader 54 "Totenkopf" were established at Fritzlar Airfield. It was equipped with Heinkel He 111 P. With the start of World War II, the KG 54 left Fritzlar in September 1939. It never returned to its home base.

In August 1941, the hangars of the airfield were used by Junkers as maintenance and production site. They constructed barracks between the airfield and the town to house the forced laborers. The bombing of the Eder Dam on 17 May 1943 had no significant effect on the production lines. Only light buildings like barracks were damaged, and a few weeks later the production lines were working like before. In November 1943, the Junkers Ju 352 plane was designed and produced in the hangars. In 1944, after completing 44 planes, production was discontinued because of lack of material. Junkers left the airfield in October 1944.

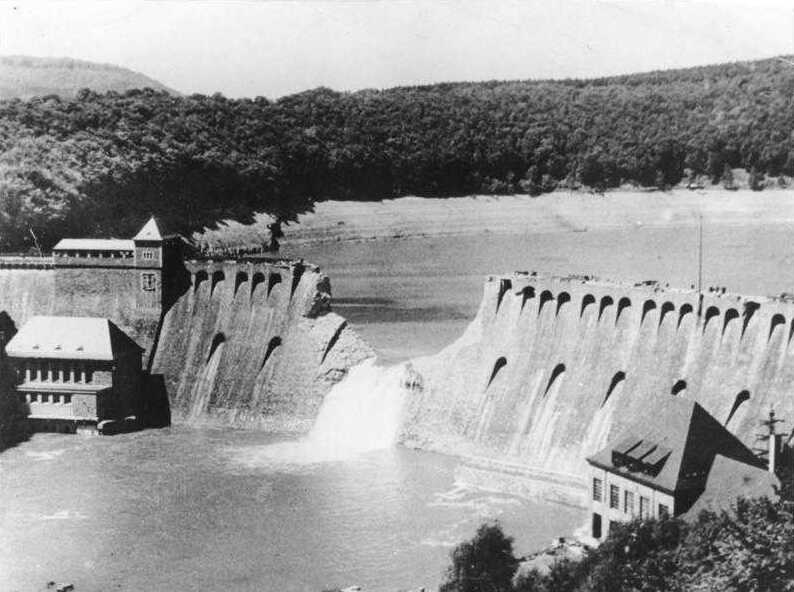
Destroyed Eder Dam

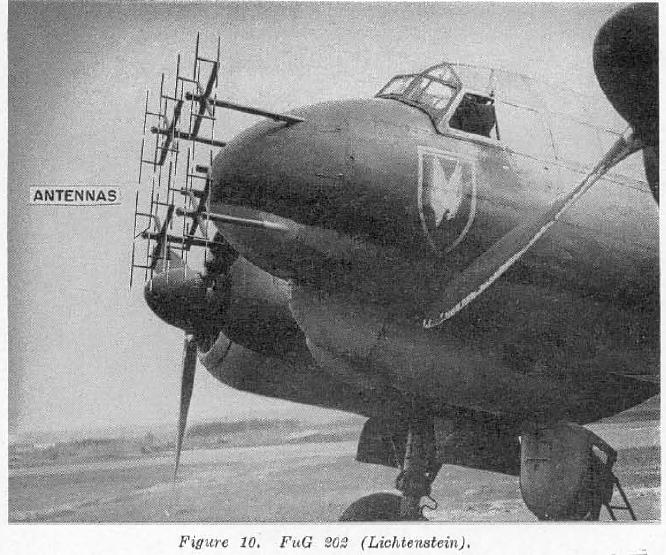
A Junkers Ju 88

Between September 1944 and March 1945, the III. Group of Nachtjagdgeschwader 1 (III./NJG 1) were based at Fritzlar airfield. The group was equipped with Messerschmitt Bf 110 G and Junkers Ju 88 G.

In March 1945, a training squadron of Nachtjagdgeschwader 101 (NJG 101) was based in Fritzlar. The lack of fuel made the school unable to train new pilots, and so the aviation trainers were assigned for combat duty.

=== USAAF use ===
The barely damaged Luftwaffe airfield was captured by parts of the 9th Infantry Division of the US Army on 30 March 1945. A few grounded planes were captured undamaged.

On 12/13 April 1945, parts of the 404th Fighter Group and 365th Fighter Group Hellcats of the United States Army Air Forces (USAAF) moved to Fritzlar and supported ground troops with their P-47 Thunderbolts until they reached the Elbe river.

After V-E Day, both groups became part of the IX Air Defense Command.

In the postwar years, the following known USAAF units were assigned to Army Air Force Station Fritzlar:

- HQ, IX Fighter Command, July–September 1945
- HQ, IX Tactical Air Command, 26 June – September 1945
- 27th Fighter Group, 20 August 1946 – 25 June 1947, Republic P-47 Thunderbolt
- 332d Bombardment Group, June–September 1945, Martin B-26 Marauder
- 365th Fighter Group, 13 April – 29 July 1945, P-47 Thunderbolt
- 366th Fighter Group, 14 September 1945 – 20 August 1946, P-47 Thunderbolt
- 370th Fighter Group, 6 August – September 1945, P-47 Thunderbolt
- 404th Fighter Group, 12 April – 23 June 1945, P-47 Thunderbolt
- 417th Night Fighter Squadron, 10 April - 19 August 1946, Northrop P-61 Black Widow

USAAF operations were phased out on 14 September 1947, and the air base was transferred from the USAAF to other branches of the United States Army.

=== US Army use ===
In 1946, parts of the 14th Armored Cavalry Regiment (USCON) were based at Fritzlar Kaserne.

The 14th ACR (USCON):

- Headquarters, Fritzlar
- Headquarters Troops, Fritzlar
- 1st Battalion, Fritzlar
- 2nd Battalion, Schweinfurt
- 3rd Battalion, Coburg
- 24th Constabulary Squad, Hersfeld

The 1st Battalion left Fritzlar in 1951 and moved to Bad Hersfeld. In 1952, the HQ of the 14th ACR moved to Fulda, and the presence of US Forces at Fritzlar Kaserne came to an end.

==== Berlin Blockade ====
During the Berlin Blockade in 1948/49, Fritzlar Air Base served as radio beacon and emergency airfield on route back to Frankfurt and Wiesbaden.

=== French Army use ===
As replacement of the US Forces, the French 5th Hussar Regiment with AMX 13 tanks was based at Fritzlar. They renamed the barracks Quartier General Lasalle. With deployment of the Bundeswehr, the French NATO forces left Fritzlar in 1956.

=== German Army use ===
In October 1956, the barracks were transferred to the Bundeswehr and renamed Flugplatz Kaserne. In 1964, they were renamed Georg-Friedrich-Kaserne, after the Fieldmarshal Prince Georg Friedrich of Waldeck.

==== Non-flying units ====
The following non-flying units were based in Fritzlar:

- 1956 Panzergrenadierbataillon 22 (Mechanized Infantry Battalion 22)
- 1958–1972 Feldjägerdienstkommando Fritzlar (MP Command Fritzlar)
- 1959–1992 Panzergrenadierbataillon 53 (former Panzergrenadierbataillon 22) (5th Brigade, 2nd Panzergrenadier Division (Bundeswehr))
- 1961–1971 Flugabwehrbataillon 2 (Anti-Aircraft Battalion 2)
- 1963–1967/1979–1996 Fernspähkompanie 300 (Long Range Reconnaissance Company 300)
- 1967–1994 Verteidigungskreiskommando 441 (Territorial Defense District Command 441)
- 1981–1994 Panzerpionierkompanie 50 (Armored Engineer Company 50)
- 1993–1996 3./Instandsetzungsbattalion 310 (3rd company of Maintenance Battalion 310)

Currently the following non-flying units are based in Fritzlar:

- Standortsanitätszentrum Fritzlar (Local Medic Center Fritzlar), since 1996
- Facharztzentrum Fritzlar (Medical Specialist Center Fritzlar), since 2001

== See also ==
- Advanced Landing Ground
