= Ophoven Airfield =

Abandoned military airfield in Belgium

Ophoven Airfield Advanced Landing Ground Y-32

- Limburg Province, Belgium Ophoven Airfield (Belgium)

Site information
- Type: Military airfield
- Controlled by: United States Army Air Forces

Location
- Coordinates: 51°08′08″N 005°47′00″E

Site history
- Built by: IX Engineering Command
- In use: December 1944-May 1945
- Materials: Pierced Steel Planking (PSP)

Ophoven Airfield is an abandoned World War II military airfield which is located west of Opglabbeek (Limburg); approximately 54 miles (87 km) northeast of Brussels.

== History ==
The airfield was built by the United States Army Air Forces IX Engineer Command, 820th Engineer Aviation Battalion in late November/early December 1944.

Known as Advanced Landing Ground "Y-32", the airfield consisted of a single 5000' (1500m) Pierced Steel Planking runway aligned 12/30. In addition, tents were erected for billeting and also for support facilities; an access road was built to the existing road infrastructure; a dump was created for supplies, ammunition, and gasoline drums, along with a drinkable water; and a minimal electrical grid for communications and station lighting was installed.

Opened on 10 December, the airfield was first used as a resupply and casualty evacuation airfield, with C-47 Skytrain transports flying in and out of the airfield frequently. Combat units did not arrive at the airfield until late January 1945, when the 370th Fighter Group, based P-47 Thunderbolt fighters at Ophoven on 27 January. In February, the 405th Fighter Group also based P-47s at the airfield. The fighter planes flew support missions, patrolling roads in front of the beachhead; strafing German military vehicles and dropping bombs on gun emplacements, anti-aircraft artillery and concentrations of German troops when spotted.

Both groups moved out at the end of April 1945, the airfield closed about a month later at the end of May. Today, the airfield is abandoned, being a mixture of agricultural fields just to the west of Ophoven.
