= Roye-Amy Airfield =

World War II military airfield

Roye-Amy Airfield Advanced Landing Ground (ALG) A-73

- Picardy Region, France Roye-Amy Airfield (France)

Site information
- Type: Military airfield
- Controlled by: United States Army Air Forces

Location
- Coordinates: 49°38′41″N 002°48′31″E

Site history
- Built by: IX Engineering Command
- In use: September 1944-August 1945
- Materials: Concrete
- Battles/wars: Western Front (World War II); Northern France Campaign

Roye-Amy Airfield is an abandoned World War II military airfield which is located approximately 5 km south-southeast of Roye, approximately 98 km north-northeast of Paris.

Originally a 1930s airport which was seized by the Germans during the Battle of France, it was used by the Luftwaffe, then by the United States Army Air Forces during World War II. After the war, the site was abandoned and is now agricultural fields.

== History ==
Roye-Amy was a pre-World War II airport, with some support buildings, a hangar and grass runways. From September 24, 1939 until 19 May 1940 the RAF 57th BEF group used the airfield for Bristol Blenheim I bombers, where they suffered heavy losses.

=== German use during World War II ===
The airfield was seized by the Germans during the Battle of France. It was not used by the Luftwaffe until May 1941, when Kampfgeschwader 1 (KG 1) was assigned with Junkers Ju 88 medium bombers, which carried out night attacks on England. The bombers remained until June when they were withdrawn.

During the occupation, the Germans constructed two 1700m concrete, all-weather runways, aligned 05/23 and 10/28. Presumably, this was due to the fortification of the Pas-de-Calais, being believed by the Germans that when the Americans and British tried to land in France to open a Second Front, the airfield would have a key role in the defense of France.

In March 1944, Roye-Amy became a day interceptor airfield which housed fighters to attack the USAAF Eighth Air Force heavy bomber fleets attacking targets in Occupied Europe and Germany. Schnellkampfgeschwader 10 (SKG 10) flew Focke-Wulf Fw 190As from 9 March until 13 May 1944. Previously not attacked by Allied bombers, Roye-Amy came under attack by Ninth Air Force Martin B-26 Marauder medium bombers and Republic P-47 Thunderbolts mostly with 500-pound General-Purpose bombs; unguided rockets and .50 caliber machine gun sweeps when Eighth Air Force heavy bombers (Boeing B-17 Flying Fortresses, Consolidated B-24 Liberators) were within interception range of the Luftwaffe aircraft assigned to the base. The attacks were timed to have the maximum effect possible to keep the interceptors pinned down on the ground and be unable to attack the heavy bombers. Also, the North American P-51 Mustang fighter-escort groups of Eighth Air Force would drop down on their return to England and attack the base with a fighter sweep and attack any target of opportunity to be found at the airfield. Unlike other Luftwaffe airfields in the area, Roye-Amy did not have any wooded areas in the vicinity for camouflage its aircraft servicing area or dispersement areas. The base was on flat, former agricultural fields and the Allied attacks caused considerable damage, destroying much of the base.

=== American use ===
American Ninth Army units moved through the area in early September 1944. On 6 September The IX Engineer Command 862d Engineer Aviation Battalion moved in and began a quick rehabilitation of the base so it could be used by American aircraft. It was declared operationally ready for Ninth Air Force combat units on 8 September, only a few days after its capture from German forces, being designated as Advanced Landing Ground "A-73 Roye/Amy Airfield"

In addition to the airfield, tents were used for billeting and also for support facilities; an access road was built to the existing road infrastructure; a dump for supplies, ammunition, and gasoline drums, along with drinkable water and minimal electrical grid for communications and station lighting. It hosted the following known units:

- 370th Fighter Group, 11–26 September 1944 Lockheed P-38 Lightning
- 391st Bombardment Group, 19 September 1944 – 16 April 1945 Martin B-26 Marauder
- 349th Troop Carrier Group, April-18 to July 15, 1945 Curtiss C-46 Commando

When the combat units moved out, Roye-Amy Airfield was closed and turned over to the French Air Ministry on 8 August 1945.

=== Postwar ===
In French control after the war, the airport sat abandoned for several years. There was much unexploded ordnance at the site which needed to be removed, as well as the wreckage of German and American aircraft. Many of the buildings at the base were destroyed by the war, and although some had been repaired by the American combat engineers, most were in ruins. There was no use for the prewar airport, and as a result, the Air Ministry sold the land, concrete runways, structures and all, out to farmers for agricultural use, sending in unexploded ordnance teams to remove the dangerous munitions.

Today all of the concrete and structures of the former airport and wartime airfield have been removed, and the land used by agriculture.

Faint outlines of the runways can be seen in aerial photography. Also, the remains of the technical support site, to the north of the airfield can be indirectly seen from the disturbances in the fields which indicate the outlines of some large buildings, probably hangars. The airfield was extensively bombed, and the craters left by the attacks were filled in, but are still evident on the landscape.

== See also ==
- Advanced Landing Ground
