= Groton–New London Airport =

Regional airport in Groton, Connecticut, USA

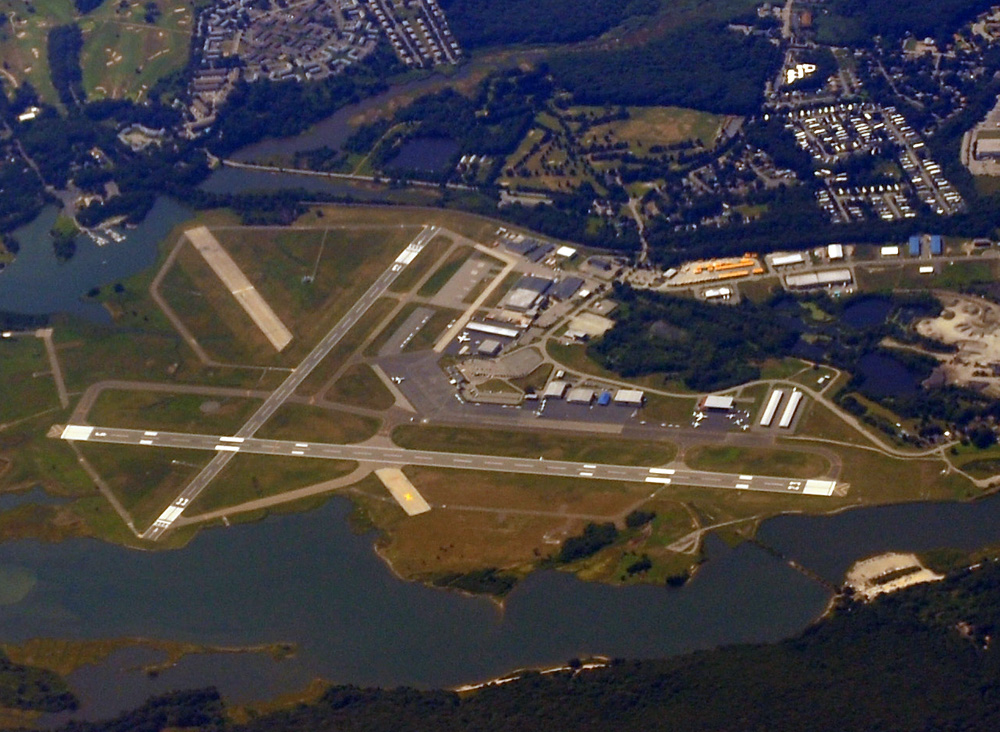
- IATA: GON; ICAO: KGON; FAA LID: GON

Summary
- Airport type: Public
- Owner: Connecticut Airport Authority
- Serves: Groton, Connecticut
- Elevation AMSL: 9.1 ft (2.8 m)
- Coordinates: 41°19′48″N 072°02′42″W
- Website: GON website

Maps
- FAA airport diagram
- Interactive map of Groton–New London Airport

Runways
Direction	Length		Surface
Direction	ft	m	Surface
5/23	5,000	1,524	Asphalt
15/33	4,000	1,219	Asphalt

Statistics (2015)
- Aircraft operations: 42,945
- Based aircraft: 30
- Source: Federal Aviation Administration

Groton–New London Airport (IATA: GON, ICAO: KGON, FAA LID: GON) is a state-owned public-use airport located three nautical miles (6 km) southeast of the central business district of Groton, a town in New London County, Connecticut, United States. It is included in the Federal Aviation Administration (FAA) National Plan of Integrated Airport Systems for 2017–2021, in which it is categorized as a regional general aviation facility. It serves the southeastern Connecticut region, including the shoreline localities of Groton, New London, and Mystic.

The airport has not had scheduled service since 2004, when US Air ceased service to the airport. Despite this loss, CTDOT/CAA continue to operate Groton-New London to commercial airport standards in an effort to keep the airport open and prepared for the possible return of commercial passenger service.

Groton-New London Airport has been used by several presidents speaking at the commencement of the nearby US Coast Guard Academy.

== History ==
Groton–New London Airport was established as the first State of Connecticut airport in 1929. Originally called Trumbull Airport after Governor Jonathan Trumbull, the airport was taken over by the United States Army Air Corps in August 1941 as a First Air Force group training base, although the runways were still grass. In 1942, the Army constructed a base and hard-surfaced runways and designated the airport as Groton Army Airfield. Through all of 1943, a total of 10 squadrons of P-47 Thunderbolt fighter groups trained at the field, with the last unit departing for overseas combat in January 1944.

In January 1944, the USAAF turned the airfield to the United States Navy. The commissioning of Groton as a Naval Airfield occurred on February 1, 1944, as an auxiliary of Quonset Point. Initially, Groton hosted various individual squadrons. Later, entire CAGs of three or four squadrons formed up at the base. The CAGs attached here during the war included CAG 83, 10, 92, 152, and 4, with their F6Fs, F4Us, SB2Cs, and TBMs. CASU 28, on board in support of the CAGs, operated one OS2U Kingfisher, one J4F Widgeon, 12 SNJs, and one NH Howard. The station had one airplane assigned, a GH Howard.

In March 1944, station personnel consisted of 87 officers and 678 enlisted men with barracks for 114 officers and 1,091 men. The peak number of aircraft reached 114 in March 1945. Groton had three concrete runways: two 4,000 ft and one of 5,000 ft. In July 1946, the Navy returned the airport to the State of Connecticut.

In 1980, the name of the airport changed to Groton–New London Airport. Today, the airport is one of two state-owned airports with commercial air carrier service. The funds necessary to operate Groton–New London Airport come from the Connecticut State Transportation Fund. Likewise, revenue derived from the airport is returned to the Transportation Fund.

The airport is integrated into the statewide transportation plan, as well as the National Airport System Plan. There were 80,319 aircraft operations during 1999 at Groton–New London Airport which included military, general aviation and commercial flights. The terminal building was last renovated in 1997, with a new roof, HVAC system, ADA compliance, new carpeting and other improvements. The terminal is mostly a single floor structure, with a second floor that houses offices in one section.

== Facilities and aircraft ==
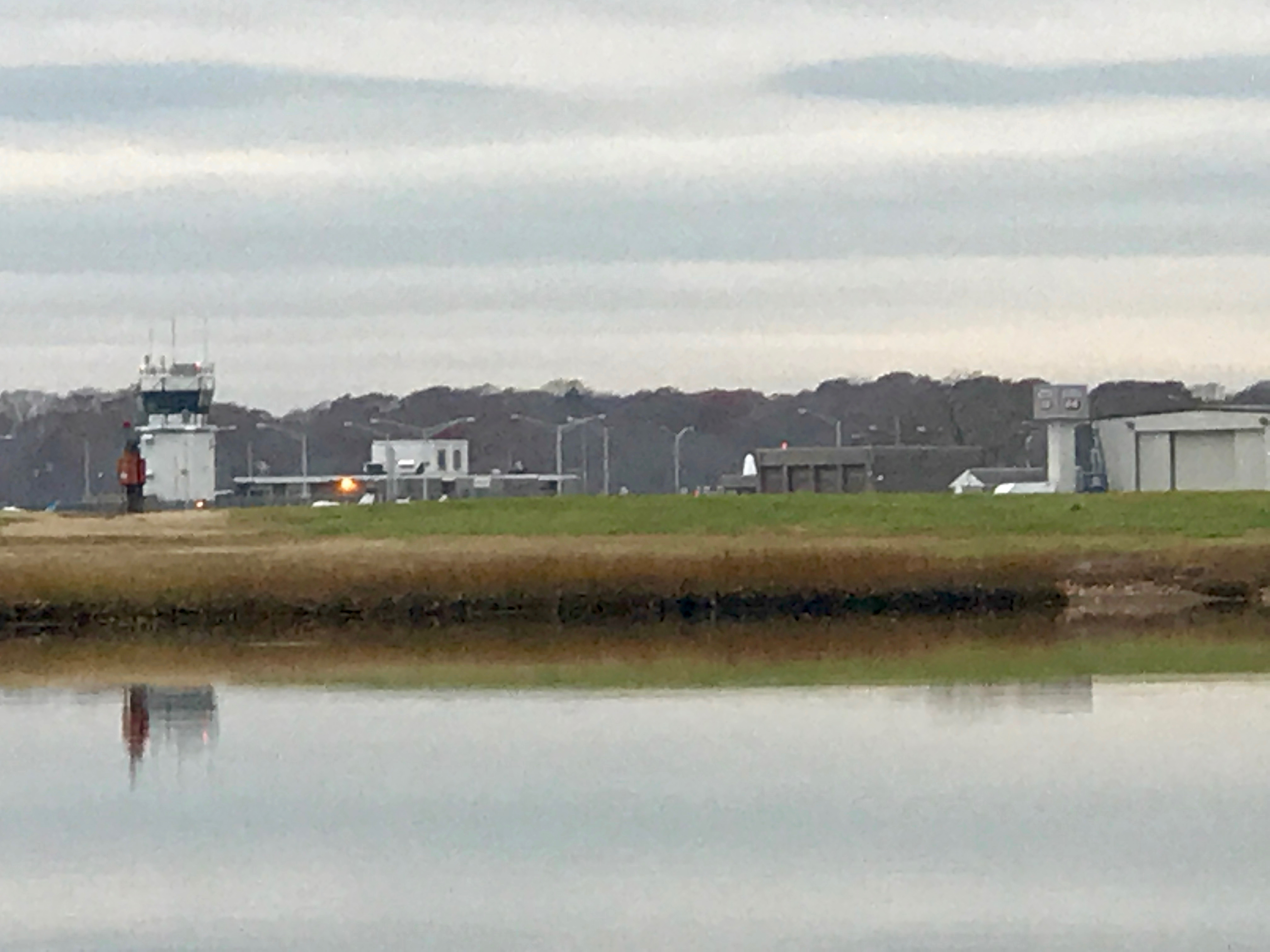
Groton-New London Airport reflected on the Poquonnock River

Groton–New London Airport covers an area of 489 acres (198 ha) at an elevation of 9.1 feet (2.8 m) above mean sea level. It has two asphalt paved runways: 5/23 is 5,000 by 150 feet (1,524 x 46 m) and 15/33 is 4,000 by 100 feet (1,219 x 30 m). EMAS is installed on both ends of runway 5/23.

For the 12-month period ending December 31, 2009, the airport had 38,582 aircraft operations, an average of 105 per day: 87% general aviation, 10% military, and 4% air taxi. At that time there were 30 aircraft based at this airport: 63% single-engine, 17% multi-engine, 10% jet, 3% helicopter, and 7% military.

The Connecticut Wing of the Civil Air Patrol Thames River Composite Squadron (NER-CT-075) operates out of the airport.

Groton-New London has been home to the Connecticut National Guard’s 1109th Theater Aviation Support Maintenance Group (abbreviated as "TASMG") since August 1st 1979 when the groups location was changed to the airport when it was converted and redesignated from "Detachment 1, 1109th Transportation Company" to Detachment 1, Groton Connecticut Army Aviation Classification and Repair Depot. In March 2012 the detachment was reorganized and redesignated to Connecticut Army National Guard 1109th Aviation Group.

KGON - Runway Information
Runway	5	23	15	33
Elevation (Feet)	5.2	6.3	8.7	5.8
Heading (Magnetic)	048	228	149	329
Heading (True)	034	214	135	315
Edge Lighting	HIRL		HIRL	
Approach Lighting	MALSR	None	None	None
Displaced Threshold	---	---	307	205
Visual Slope Lights	PAPI	VASI	PAPI	PAPI
Glide Slope	3.00°	3.00°	4.00°	3.75°

== Scheduled air service ==
Over the years, and usually no more than one at a time, various domestic airlines served the airport, including Pan Am Clipper Connection, NewAir, Allegheny Airlines, Piedmont, and Pilgrim Airlines. Scheduled commercial passenger service was limited to small turboprop aircraft such as de Havilland Dash 8 and Beechcraft 1900, with service to Boston, New York, Philadelphia, or Washington, DC. After the 1996 expansion of T. F. Green Airport and the popularity of Southwest Airlines, the Groton airport ceased to be a profitable destination. US Airways Express, the last scheduled carrier to serve the airport, terminated its GON–PHL service in 2004. Charter services are available through the onsite fixed-base operator.

== Fixed-base operators ==
Columbia Air Services (since 1983) and Lanmar Aviation (since 2003) have been the two fixed-base operators serving the airport. In 2012, faced with declining demand for services, the two proposed merging their Groton operations as a joint venture called Mystic Jet Center. In January 2013, the U.S Department of Justice's Antitrust Division announced that it would not interfere with the merger, citing sufficient competition from nearby airports.

== Climate ==
Climate data for New London (Groton) 1991–2020 normals, extremes 1957–2021
Month	Jan	Feb	Mar	Apr	May	Jun	Jul	Aug	Sep	Oct	Nov	Dec	Year
Record high °F (°C)	69 (21)	67 (19)	78 (26)	88 (31)	91 (33)	95 (35)	101 (38)	99 (37)	93 (34)	87 (31)	79 (26)	69 (21)	101 (38)
Mean maximum °F (°C)	56.6 (13.7)	55.8 (13.2)	65.5 (18.6)	73.6 (23.1)	81.9 (27.7)	88.0 (31.1)	91.6 (33.1)	88.7 (31.5)	84.7 (29.3)	76.5 (24.7)	67.4 (19.7)	60.0 (15.6)	92.6 (33.7)
Mean daily maximum °F (°C)	38.8 (3.8)	40.8 (4.9)	47.3 (8.5)	56.9 (13.8)	66.4 (19.1)	75.2 (24.0)	80.8 (27.1)	79.8 (26.6)	73.6 (23.1)	63.3 (17.4)	53.2 (11.8)	44.1 (6.7)	60.0 (15.6)
Daily mean °F (°C)	31.3 (−0.4)	32.9 (0.5)	39.5 (4.2)	48.9 (9.4)	58.1 (14.5)	67.3 (19.6)	73.4 (23.0)	72.5 (22.5)	65.8 (18.8)	55.2 (12.9)	45.5 (7.5)	36.8 (2.7)	52.3 (11.3)
Mean daily minimum °F (°C)	23.8 (−4.6)	24.9 (−3.9)	31.6 (−0.2)	40.9 (4.9)	49.9 (9.9)	59.3 (15.2)	65.9 (18.8)	65.1 (18.4)	58.0 (14.4)	47.1 (8.4)	37.9 (3.3)	29.5 (−1.4)	44.5 (6.9)
Mean minimum °F (°C)	4.1 (−15.5)	6.9 (−13.9)	14.7 (−9.6)	29.0 (−1.7)	38.1 (3.4)	46.8 (8.2)	56.0 (13.3)	54.2 (12.3)	43.6 (6.4)	32.2 (0.1)	26.6 (−3.0)	14.2 (−9.9)	1.5 (−16.9)
Record low °F (°C)	−14 (−26)	−12 (−24)	0 (−18)	14 (−10)	30 (−1)	38 (3)	47 (8)	41 (5)	29 (−2)	22 (−6)	8 (−13)	−10 (−23)	−14 (−26)
Average precipitation inches (mm)	3.91 (99)	3.42 (87)	4.92 (125)	4.40 (112)	3.67 (93)	3.93 (100)	3.42 (87)	4.19 (106)	4.29 (109)	4.42 (112)	3.75 (95)	4.59 (117)	48.91 (1,242)
Average snowfall inches (cm)	5.8 (15)	8.3 (21)	3.9 (9.9)	0.8 (2.0)	0.0 (0.0)	0.0 (0.0)	0.0 (0.0)	0.0 (0.0)	0.0 (0.0)	0.0 (0.0)	0.5 (1.3)	5.2 (13)	24.5 (62)
Average precipitation days (≥ 0.01 in)	11.4	9.7	11.5	11.6	11.9	9.5	9.7	9.3	10.2	10.4	10.0	12.4	127.6
Average snowy days (≥ 0.1 in)	3.1	2.7	1.7	0.3	0.0	0.0	0.0	0.0	0.0	0.0	0.2	1.9	9.9
Source: NOAA

== See also ==
- Connecticut World War II Army Airfields
- List of airports in Connecticut
