= 341st Air Refueling Squadron =

Inactive US Air Force unit

341st Air Refueling Squadron (later 341st Expeditionary Air Refueling Squadron
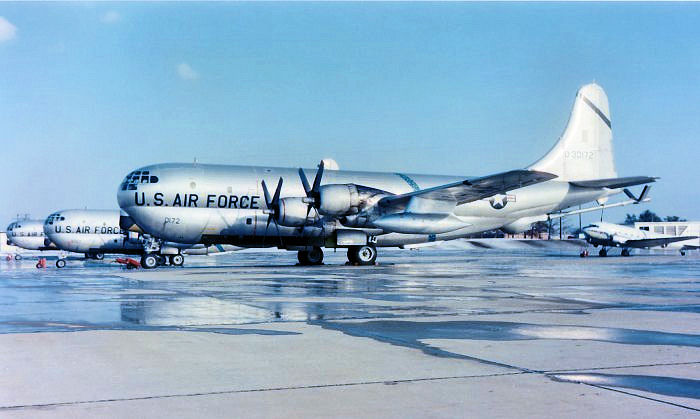
- SAC KC-97 Stratofreighters
- Active: 1943–1945; 1955–1963
- Country: United States
- Branch: United States Air Force
- Role: Air refueling
- Motto: Potentium Providimus (Latin for 'We Provide Power') (after 1955)
- Engagements: European Theater of World War II

Insignia
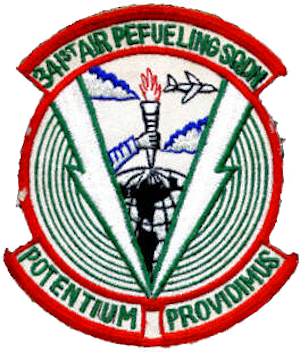
- Patch with 341st Air Refueling Squadron emblem

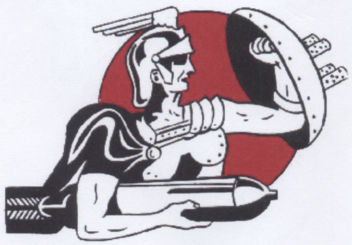
- 641st Bombardment Squadron Emblem (Note: Approved 21 December 1943. Description: Over and through an Indian red disc, the armed warrior Constantine the Great, in black and white, holding under the right arm a black and white aerial bomb, and a shield in the left arm formed in the shape of the nose of an A-20 aircraft with four 50 caliber machine guns thereon.)

The 341st Air Refueling Squadron is an inactive United States Air Force unit, activated in 1943. Its first predecessor is the 641st Bombardment Squadron. After training with Douglas A-20 Havocs in the United States the squadron deployed to the European Theater of World War II, where it engaged in combat until the Surrender of Germany. It was last assigned to the 409th Bombardment Group at Westover Field, Massachusetts, where it was inactivated on 7 November 1945.

The 341st Air Refueling Squadron was organized in 1955. After organizing and training at Castle Air Force Base, California it moved to Dow Air Force Base, Maine. It provided air refueling for Strategic Air Command units from Dow until it was inactivated on 1 February 1963 as SAC replaced its tanker force with more modern Boeing KC-135 Stratotankers.

The two squadrons were consolidated in 1985, but the consolidated squadron has not been active. It was converted to provisional status in February 2001 and redesignated 341st Expeditionary Air Refueling Squadron.

== History ==
=== World War II ===
The 641st Bombardment Squadron was activated in June 1943 at Will Rogers Field, Oklahoma as one of the four original squadrons of the 409th Bombardment Group. The squadron trained under Third Air Force in Oklahoma, Texas and Louisiana with Douglas A-20 Havoc light bombardment aircraft.

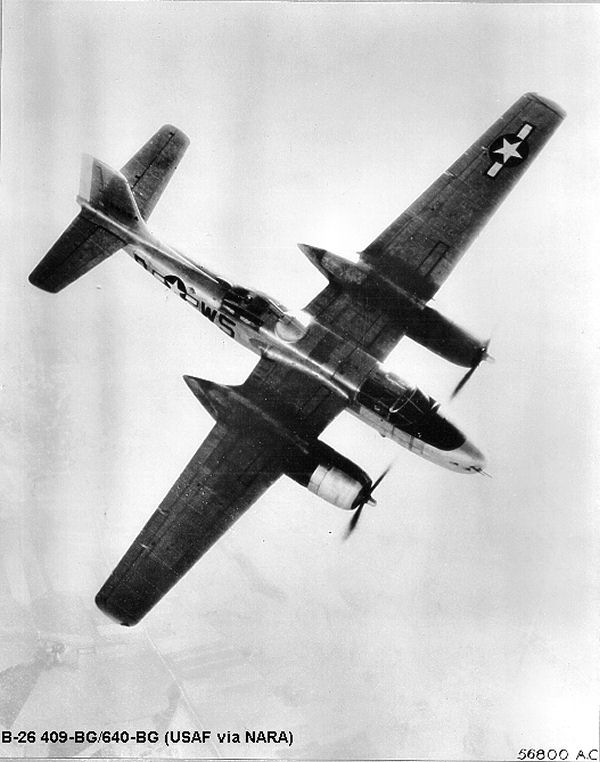
Douglas A-26 Invader of the 409th Bombardment Group

The squadron deployed to the European Theater of Operations in March 1944, where it became part of IX Bomber Command of Ninth Air Force.

The 641st initially flew sweeps over Occupied France from its base in England, attacking coastal defenses, V-1 flying bomb and V-2 rocket sites, airfields, and other targets in France in preparation for Operation Overlord, the invasion of Normandy. After D-Day, the squadron supported ground forces during the Battle of Normandy by hitting gun batteries, rail lines, bridges, communications, and other objectives. During July 1944, it aided the Allied offensive at Caen and the breakthrough at Saint-Lô with attacks on enemy troops, flak positions, fortified villages, and supply dumps.

The squadron moved to Advanced Landing Grounds in France in September 1944, providing Third Army with close air support in its advance toward Germany through November.

In December, the squadron converted to Douglas A-26 Invaders. It then participated in the Battle of the Bulge by attacking lines of communications and logistics. The squadron continued combat operations until May, flying its last combat mission against an ammunition dump in Czechoslovakia on 3 May.

The unit returned to the United States and initially was stationed at Seymour Johnson Field, North Carolina where it prepared to deploy to the Pacific Theater of Operations for operations against the Japanese Home Islands. The deployment to the Pacific Theater was cancelled with the Surrender of Japan in August. The 641st was inactivated at Westover Field, Massachusetts in early November.

=== Cold War ===
The 341st Air Refueling Squadron was activated in June 1955 at Castle Air Force Base, California, although it did not become operational until 20 July. After completing training with the 93d Bombardment Wing at Castle, the squadron moved to its permanent home at Dow Air Force Base, Maine where it was assigned to the 4060th Air Refueling Wing. The squadron mission was to provide air refueling for Strategic Air Command (SAC) units. The squadron flew KC-97F and KC-97G Stratofreighters from activation in 1955 until it was discontinued in 1963.

The 341st provided refueling support for SAC wings deploying and redeploying from Europe and North Africa during Operation Reflex. It also deployed to locations such as Ernest Harmon Air Force Base, Newfoundland and Thule Air Base, Greenland. In 1960 the squadron transferred to the 4038th Strategic Wing, which replaced the 4060th wing at Dow as part of a SAC program to disperse its Boeing B-52 Stratofortress bombers over a larger number of bases, thus making it more difficult for the Soviet Union to knock out the entire fleet with a surprise first strike.

During October and November 1962 the 341st temporarily curtailed training and assumed an increased alert posture in response to the Cuban Missile Crisis. The squadron became non-operational on 15 July 1963 and was inactivated on 1 September as part of the phaseout of the KC-97 from SAC.

The 641st Bombardment Squadron and the 341st Air Refueling Squadron were consolidated into a single unit on 19 September 1985 but the consolidated squadron has not been active. In 2001, the squadron was converted to provisional status as the 341st Expeditionary Air Refueling Squadron.

== Lineage ==
641st Bombardment Squadron

- Constituted as the 641st Bombardment Squadron (Light) and activated, on 1 June 1943
- Redesignated 641st Bombardment Squadron, Light c. March 1944

Inactivated on 7 November 1945

- Consolidated with the 341st Air Refueling Squadron, Medium on 19 September 1985 as the 341st Air Refueling Squadron, Heavy

341st Expeditionary Air Refueling Squadron

- Constituted as the 341st Air Refueling Squadron, Medium on 9 April 1955

Activated on 11 June 1955
Discontinued and inactivated on 1 September 1963

- Consolidated with the 641st Bombardment Squadron on 19 September 1985 as the 341st Air Refueling Squadron, Heavy (remained inactive)
- Converted to provisional status and redesignated 341st Expeditionary Air Refueling Squadron on 5 February 2001

=== Assignments ===
- 409th Bombardment Group: 1 June 1943 – 7 November 1945
- Fifteenth Air Force: 11 June 1954 (attached to 93d Bombardment Wing)
- 4060th Air Refueling Wing: 15 August 1955
- 4038th Strategic Wing: 1 February 1960
- 397th Bombardment Wing: 1 February 1963 – 1 September 1963
- United States Air Forces Europe to activate or inactivate as needed after 5 February 2001

=== Stations ===
- Will Rogers Field, Oklahoma, 1 June 1943
- Woodward Army Air Field, Oklahoma, 2 October 1943
- Pounds Army Air Field, Texas, 1 December 1943
- DeRidder Army Air Base, Louisiana, 17 December 1943 – 10 February 1944
- RAF Little Walden (AAF-165), England, 7 March 1944
- Bretigny Airfield (A-48), France, 18 September 1944
- Laon-Couvron Airfield (A-70), 12 February 1945 – 25 June 1945
- Seymour Johnson Field, North Carolina, 15 August 1945
- Westover Field, Massachusetts, 6 October 1945 – 7 November 1945
- Castle Air Force Base, California, 11 June 1955
- Dow Air Force Base, Maine, 14 August 1955 - 1 September 1963

=== Aircraft ===
- Douglas A-20 Havoc, 1943–1945
- Douglas A-26 Invader, 1945
- Boeing KC-97 Stratotanker, 1955–1963

=== Campaigns ===
Campaign Streamer	Campaign	Dates	Notes
	Air Offensive, Europe	7 March 1944 – 5 June 1944	641st Bombardment Squadron
	Normandy	6 June 1944 – 24 July 1944	641st Bombardment Squadron
	Northern France	25 July 1944 – 14 September 1944	641st Bombardment Squadron
	Rhineland	5 September 1944 – 21 March 1945	641st Bombardment Squadron
	Ardennes-Alsace	16 December 1944 – 25 January 1945	641st Bombardment Squadron
	Central Europe	22 March 1944 – 21 May 1945	641st Bombardment Squadron
	Air Combat, EAME Theater	7 March 1944 – 11 May 1945	641st Bombardment Squadron
