= 642d Bombardment Squadron =

United States Army Air Forces unit in World War II

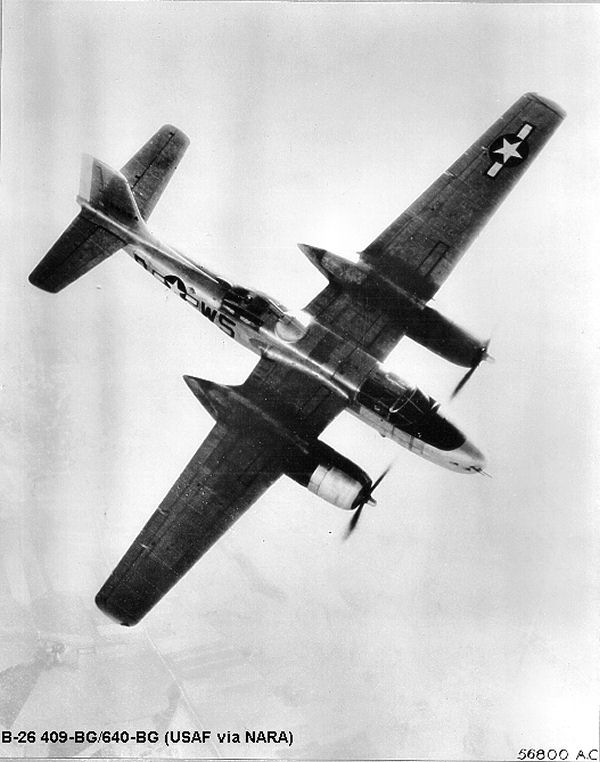
- Douglas A-26 Invader of the 409th Bombardment Group
- Active: 1943-1945
- Country: United States
- Branch: United States Air Force
- Role: Light bombardment
- Engagements: European Theater of Operations

The 642d Bombardment Squadron is an inactive United States Army Air Forces unit. After training with Douglas A-20 Havocs in the United States the squadron deployed to the European Theater of World War II, where it engaged in combat until the Surrender of Germany. It was last assigned to the 409th Bombardment Group at Westover Field, Massachusetts, where it was inactivated on 7 November 1945.

== History ==
The 642d Bombardment Squadron was activated in June 1943 at Will Rogers Field, Oklahoma as one of the four original squadrons of the 409th Bombardment Group. The squadron trained under Third Air Force in Oklahoma, Texas and Louisiana with A-20 Havoc light bombardment aircraft.

The squadron deployed to the European Theater of Operations in March 1944, where it became part of IX Bomber Command of Ninth Air Force.

The 642d initially flew sweeps over Occupied France from its base in England, attacking coastal defenses, V-1 flying bomb and V-2 rocket sites, airfields, and other targets in France in preparation for Operation Overlord, the invasion of Normandy. After D-Day, the squadron supported ground forces during the Battle of Normandy by hitting gun batteries, rail lines, bridges, communications, and other objectives. During July 1944, it aided the Allied offensive at Caen and Operation Cobra, the breakthrough at Saint-Lô with attacks on enemy troops, flak positions, fortified villages, and supply dumps.

The squadron moved to Advanced Landing Grounds in France in September 1944, providing Third Army with close air support in its advance toward Germany through November.

In December, the squadron converted to Douglas A-26 Invaders. It then participated in the Battle of the Bulge by attacking lines of communications and logistics. The squadron continued combat operations until May, flying its last combat mission against an ammunition dump in Czechoslovakia on 3 May.

The unit returned to the United States and initially was stationed at Seymour Johnson Field, North Carolina where it prepared to deploy to the Pacific Theater of Operations for operations against the Japanese Home Islands. The deployment to the Pacific Theater was cancelled with the Surrender of Japan in August. The 642d was inactivated at Westover Field, Massachusetts in early November.

== Lineage ==
- Constituted as the 642d Bombardment Squadron (Light) and activated on 1 June 1943

Redesignated 642d Bombardment Squadron, Light in 1944
Inactivated on 7 November 1945

=== Assignments ===
- 409th Bombardment Group, 1 June 1943 – 7 November 1945

=== Stations ===
- Will Rogers Field, Oklahoma, 1 June 1943
- Woodward Army Air Field, Oklahoma, 2 October 1943
- Pounds Army Air Field, Texas, 1 December 1943
- DeRidder Army Air Base, Louisiana, 17 December 1943 - 10 February 1944
- RAF Little Walden (AAF-165), England, 7 March 1944
- Bretigny Airfield (A-48), France, 18 September 1944
- Laon-Couvron Airfield (A-70), 12 February 1945 - 25 June 1945
- Seymour Johnson Field, North Carolina, 15 August 1945
- Westover Field, Massachusetts, 6 October 1945 - 7 November 1945

=== Aircraft ===
- Douglas A-20 Havoc, 1943–1945
- Douglas A-26 Invader, 1945

=== Campaigns ===
Campaign Streamer	Campaign	Dates	Notes
	Air Offensive, Europe	7 March 1944 – 5 June 1944	
	Normandy	6 June 1944 – 24 July 1944	
	Northern France	25 July 1944 – 14 September 1944	
	Rhineland	`5 September 1944 – 21 March 1945	
	Ardennes-Alsace	16 December 1944 – 25 January 1945	
	Central Europe	22 March 1944 – 21 May 1945	
	Air Combat, EAME Theater	7 March 1944 – 11 May 1945	
