= 643d Bombardment Squadron =

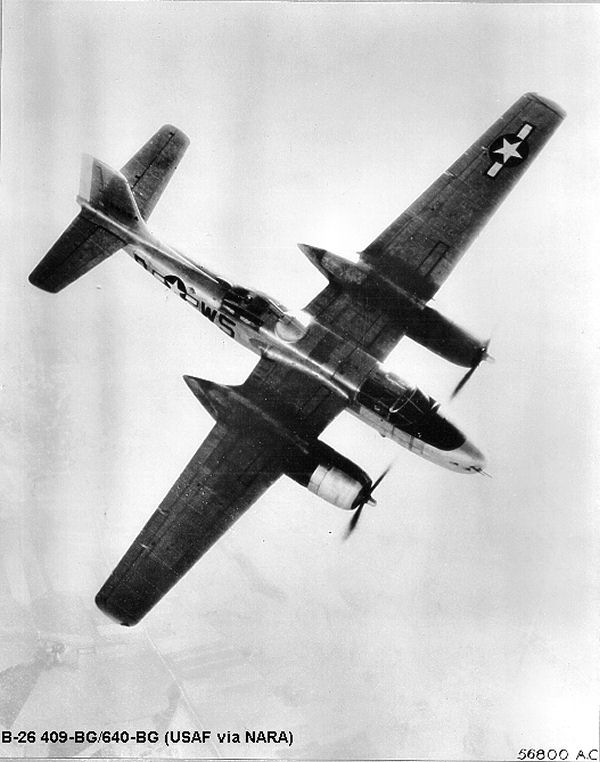
- Douglas A-26 Invader of the 409th Bombardment Group
- Active: 1943-1945
- Country: United States
- Branch: United States Air Force
- Role: Light bombardment
- Engagements: European Theater of Operations

Insignia
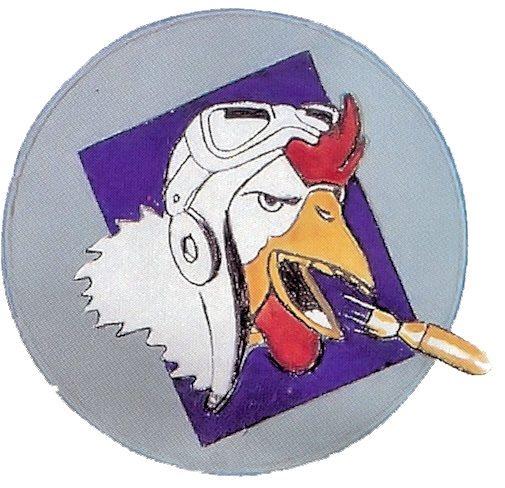
- 643d Bombardment Squadron Emblem (Note: Approved 18 January 1944. Description: On a disc light turquoise blue, thin border ultramarine blue, piped white, an ultramarine blue rectangle bendwise surmounted by the head of a game cock white, beak yellow, comb and wattles red, wearing a white aviator's helmet and goggles, outlined black, and blowing a yellow and white aerial bomb from the beak toward the base.)

The 643d Bombardment Squadron is an inactive United States Army Air Forces unit. After training with Douglas A-20 Havocs in the United States the squadron deployed to the European Theater of World War II, where it engaged in combat until the Surrender of Germany. It was last assigned to the 409th Bombardment Group at Westover Field, Massachusetts, where it was inactivated on 7 November 1945.

== History ==
The 643d Bombardment Squadron was activated in June 1943 at Will Rogers Field, Oklahoma as one of the four original squadrons of the 409th Bombardment Group. The squadron trained under Third Air Force in Oklahoma, Texas and Louisiana with Douglas A-20 Havoc light bombardment aircraft.

The squadron deployed to the European Theater of Operations in March 1944, where it became part of IX Bomber Command of Ninth Air Force.

The 643d initially flew sweeps over Occupied France from its base in England, attacking coastal defenses, V-1 flying bomb and V-2 rocket sites, airfields, and other targets in France in preparation for Operation Overlord, the invasion of Normandy. After D-Day, the squadron supported ground forces during the Battle of Normandy by hitting gun batteries, rail lines, bridges, communications, and other objectives. During July 1944, it aided the Allied offensive at Caen and Operation Cobra, the breakthrough at Saint-Lô with attacks on enemy troops, flak positions, fortified villages, and supply dumps.

The squadron moved to Advanced Landing Grounds in France in September 1944, providing Third Army with close air support in its advance toward Germany through November.

In December, the squadron converted to Douglas A-26 Invaders. It then participated in the Battle of the Bulge by attacking lines of communications and logistics. The squadron continued combat operations until May, flying its last combat mission against an ammunition dump in Czechoslovakia on 3 May.

The unit returned to the United States and initially was assigned to Seymour Johnson Field, North Carolina where it prepared to deploy to the Pacific Theater of Operations for operations against the Japanese Home Islands. The deployment to the Pacific Theater was cancelled with the Surrender of Japan in August. The 643d was inactivated at Westover Field, Massachusetts in early November.

== Lineage ==
- Constituted 643d Bombardment Squadron (Light) and activated on 1 June 1943

Redesignated 643d Bombardment Squadron, Light in 1944
Inactivated on 7 November 1945

=== Assignments ===
- 409th Bombardment Group, 1 June 1943 - 7 November 1945

=== Stations ===
- Will Rogers Field, Oklahoma, 1 June 1943
- Woodward Army Airfield, Oklahoma, 2 October 1943
- Pounds Army Airfield, Texas, 1 December 1943
- DeRidder Army Airbase, Louisiana, 17 December 1943 - 10 February 1944
- RAF Little Walden (AAF-165), England, 7 Mar 1944
- Bretigny Airfield (A-48), France, 18 September 1944
- Laon-Couvron Airfield (A-70), 12 February 1945 - 25 June 1945
- Seymour Johnson Field, North Carolina, 15 August 1945
- Westover Field, Massachusetts, 6 October 1945 - 7 November 1945

=== Aircraft ===
- Douglas A-20 Havoc, 1943–1945
- Douglas A-26 Invader, 1945

=== Campaigns ===
| Campaign Streamer | Campaign | Dates | Notes |
|---|---|---|---|
| | Air Offensive, Europe | 7 March 1944 – 5 June 1944 | |
| | Normandy | 6 June 1944 – 24 July 1944 | |
| | Northern France | 25 July 1944 – 14 September 1944 | |
| | Rhineland | `5 September 1944 – 21 March 1945 | |
| | Ardennes-Alsace | 16 December 1944 – 25 January 1945 | |
| | Central Europe | 22 March 1944 – 21 May 1945 | |
| | Air Combat, EAME Theater | 7 March 1944 – 11 May 1945 | |
