= Pounds Army Air Field =

- Tyler Army Air Field
- Part of Third Air Force
- Near Tyler, Texas
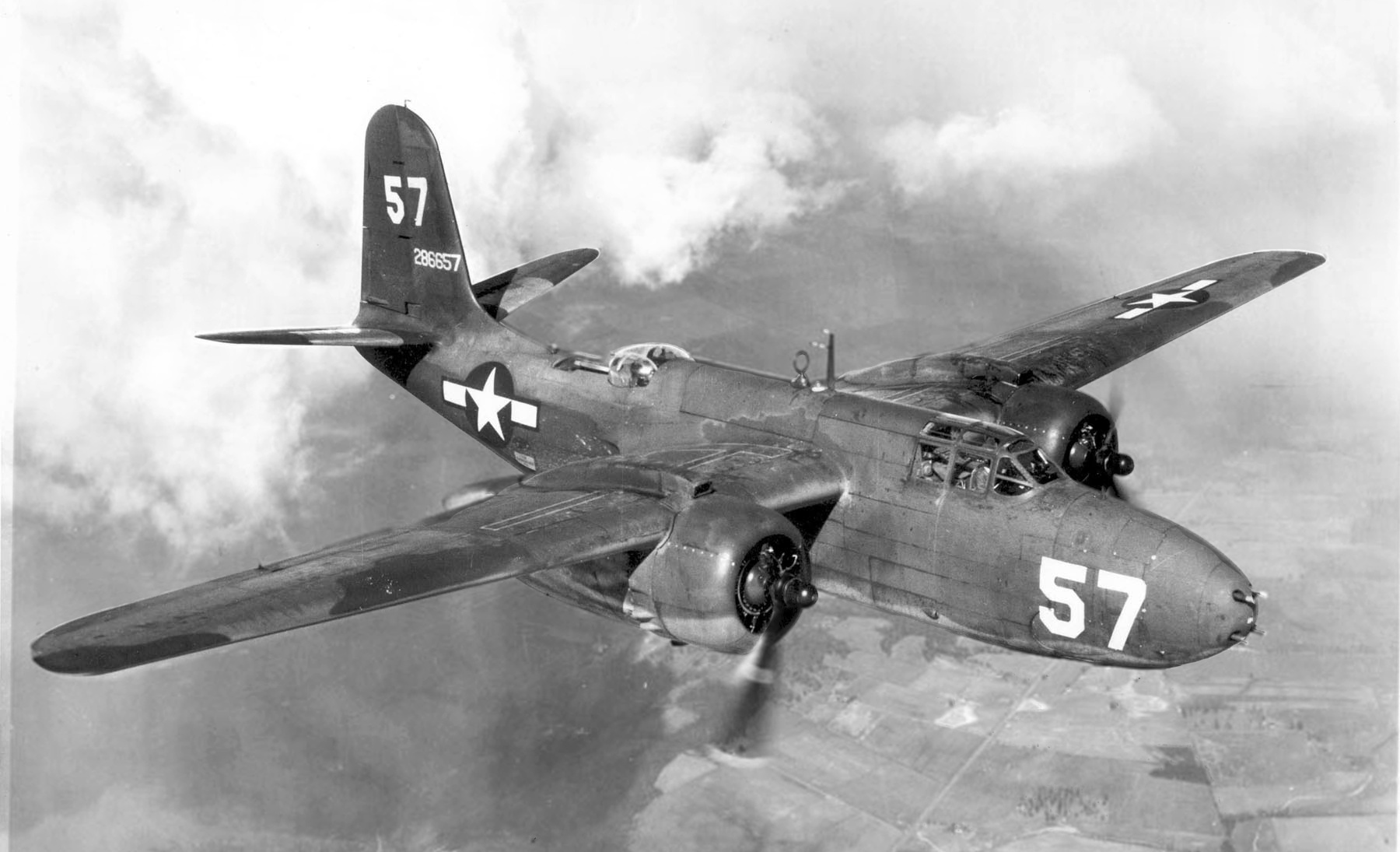
- III Bomber Command Douglas A-20G Havoc 42-86657 light bomber used for group training.

Site information
- Condition: Now: Tyler Pounds Regional Airport

Location
- Location of Pounds Army Air Field
- Coordinates: 32°21′14″N 95°24′10″W

Site history
- Built: 1929 (As Civil Airport)
- In use: 1942–1945
- Fate: Returned to civil use, 1946.
- Battles/wars: World War II

Garrison information
- Garrison: United States Army Air Forces

Airfield information
Runways
Direction	Length and surface
00/18	5,100 × 150 Ft Concrete
09/27	5,100 × 150 Ft Concrete
13/31	5,100 × 150 Ft Concrete

Pounds Army Air Field is a former United States Army Air Forces airfield, located 6 mi (9.7 km) west of Tyler, Texas. It was established in 1942 and assigned to Third Air Force. Its mission was the training of units, crews, and support individuals prior to their deployment to the combat theaters overseas. It was closed as an active military airfield on 31 January 1945 and was subsequently turned over to local civilian authorities. Today it remains in use by the city of Tyler as Tyler Pounds Regional Airport.

== History ==
=== Establishment ===
Pounds Field was established by the City of Tyler in 1929 at a cost of $40,450 (equivalent to $758,438 in 2025) as a municipal airport. As part of the buildup of the Army Air Corps in 1941, the Administrator of Civil Aeronautics of the Department of Commerce, acting under the Commerce Appropriation act, entered an agreement with the city for the development of the Tyler Municipal Airport as a necessity for national defense. In exchange, the city would continue to use the airport as a civil facility. In November 1942, the Army Air Forces began the conversion of the municipal airport to a military airfield, with the construction of hangars, a large aircraft parking ramp, two hard-surfaced runways along with a station area consisting of numerous buildings and barracks to support 2,000 personnel. Initial construction was completed in April 1943. The facility, named Tyler Army Air Field was assigned to Third Air Force officially on 27 March 1943. Third Air Force assigned the facility to Barksdale Field, Louisiana, as a sub-base.

A detachment was assigned to Tyler from Barksdale to prepare the facility as an operational training field. This included erecting a control tower and also setting up facilities such as a hospital, post exchange and other support facilities. The land also required sod and shrubbery which was purchased from local sources along with service clubs for keeping up enlisted men's morale. In April transient aircraft began to land at the airfield and a transient alert detachment was established to render refueling and maintenance support.

=== Jack Windham Pounds ===
On 8 November 1943, the facility was renamed Pounds Army Air Field in honor of Second Lieutenant Jack Windham Pounds. Lt Pounds was killed in the crash of a Vultee BT-13A Valiant (41-1249) at Lemoore Army Air Field, California on 4 March 1942. He was a flying instructor at Lemoore who was born in Tyler.

=== Operational use ===
On 11 November 1943, Pounds AAF was formerly dedicated, and the sub-base detachment was re-designated Headquarters and Headquarters Squadron, Pounds Army Air Field, and consisted of medical, signal and a flying training detachment. Other support units which arrived were the 370th Service Group detachment, the Ordnance Section of Barksdale Field Base Detachment and a detachment of the 105th Army Airways Communications Squadron. The Service Group acted as a sub-depot supplying replacement and spare parts for units using the airfield for training, the Ordnance Section serviced all base and aircraft weapons along with all vehicles, and the control tower was manned by 6 men of the communications squadron.

The base's first arrivals for training was the 344th Bombardment Group, comprising the 494th and 495th Bombardment Squadrons. It was equipped with Martin B-26 Marauder medium bombers, arriving from Lakeland Army Air Field, Florida on 10 September 1943. The group received advanced training at Pounds and moved back to Lakeland on 15 November 1943. The 344th was replaced by the 409th Bombardment Group, comprising the 642d and 643d Bombardment Squadrons. It was equipped with Douglas A-20G Havoc light bombers, arriving from Woodward Army Air Field, Oklahoma on 1 December 1943. It also received advanced training before departing for DeRidder Army Airbase, Louisiana on 15 December. These units were accommodated by the Pounds HHS, which provided the barracks, operational buildings, tents and other training requirements.

In early 1944, training at the airfield was re-oriented from bomber units to the training of observation and reconnaissance aircraft units. On 1 February 1944, the 159th Liaison Squadron (Commando), arrived from Cox Field, Paris, Texas, equipped with Stinson L-5 Grasshoppers. The unit was composed of 109 enlisted and 12 officer personnel. On 30 May, the squadron departed for Statesboro Army Air Field, Georgia.

On 1 May 1944, in accordance with a re-alignment of training units, the Ponds HHS was redesignated as the 362d Army Air Forces Base Unit (Training), Section "A". It was further changed to Squadron "A" on 15 June. Also on 1 May, two Link Trainer flight simulators were received from Barksdale, which gave the base additional training resources, along with additional personnel for instruction and aircraft maintenance. In addition, the sub-depot was expanded with a larger selection of parts to support assigned aircraft.

Also in May 1944, Pounds Field was the location of a large training exercise involving Douglas C-47 Skytrain troop carrier aircraft and CG-4 Waco Gliders, which arrived from Bergstrom Field, Texas. Army Paratroopers were airdropped onto the airfield and in the exercise "captured" it as part of the training exercise during a night parachute drop. The exercise was one of the last staged in the United States prior to the D-Day invasion of France, and immediately after the exercise was completed, the personnel, aircraft and equipment were transferred to bases in England.

On 9 April, the 11th Tactical Reconnaissance Squadron arrived from Campbell Army Air Field, Camp Campbell, Kentucky with 237 enlisted and 37 officers. Initially arriving with P-40 Warhawk fighters, the unit transitioned to F-10 Mitchell reconnaissance bombers. On 11 July the squadron departed to Lafyette Army Air Field, Louisiana for further training.

The 1st Reconnaissance Squadron (Special) ground echelon arrived from Jackson Barracks, New Orleans, Louisiana, where the unit was organized with 231 enlisted and 37 officers. It was previously assigned to anti-submarine duty with Sixth Air Force in the Caribbean, and was returned to the United States without equipment. Initially equipped with some Bell P-39 Airacobras, O-47s and a Douglas B-18 Bolo after its arrival at Pounds, the squadron was fully re-equipped with F-3A Havoc reconnaissance bombers.

The newly activated 161st Liaison Squadron arrived from Statesboro on 10 July with 137 enlisted and 17 officers without aircraft. They were equipped with an allotment of L-5 Grasshoppers and Boeing B-13 Stearman trainers. From Pounds, the squadron trained with army ground forces at Fort Polk, Louisiana on 30 July, being temporarily transferred to Mansfield, Louisiana. The squadron returned for additional training from Mansfield on 30 September before departing permanently on 19 November 1944.

By mid-November, with all but the 1st Reconnaissance Squadron having moved out there was little flying activity originating at the airfield. Also, most of the 1st's aircraft were normally deployed to other airfields in the United States performing cross-country training missions. Pounds Field became a destination for many Training Command aircraft from Randolph Field, Waco Army Air Field and Blackland Army Air Field, primarily AT-6 Texan advanced trainers, along with AT-9 and AT-10 Wichita twin-engine trainers. The aircraft would use Pounds for touch and go landings on routine training missions.

=== Inactivation and closure ===
The 1st Reconnaissance Squadron was re-designated the 41st Photo Reconnaissance Squadron on 25 November and ordered moved to Muskogee Army Air Field, Oklahoma on 6 December 1944. With the 41st moving out, flying other than that of transient aircraft ended. The base unit was also reduced in size with a personnel strength of only 43 enlisted and 6 officers assigned to the field. Additional personnel were ordered transferred just after Christmas and with the new year of 1945, orders were received from Headquarters, Third Air Force that jurisdiction of Pounds Army Airfield was to be transferred to Army Air Forces Technical Service Command for subsequent closure. The 362d AAF Base Unit was discontinued effective 30 January.

During 1945, Technical Services Command transferred any useful military equipment and prepared the base for return to full civilian control. It was subsequently transferred to the jurisdiction of the War Assets Administration (WAA) for disposal. Throughout 1945, buildings and equipment were sold, and Pounds Army Air Field was closed with the entire facility being transferred to the City of Tyler.

Today, the NE/SW runway has been lengthened for jet use, and the terminal at the Tyler Pounds Regional Airport has been greatly expanded and rebuilt, the other two runways being maintained for active use. The former Army Air Forces base lies on the north side of the airport, being known as the "Historic Aviation Memorial Museum". Several light industrial buildings are located next to the old parking ramp, along with the control tower and a World War II hangar are all that exists of the former military airfield along with a few abandoned concrete building foundations. There is a collection of retired Air Force and Navy aircraft along with some Army helicopters on static display for public viewing.

=== Major units assigned ===
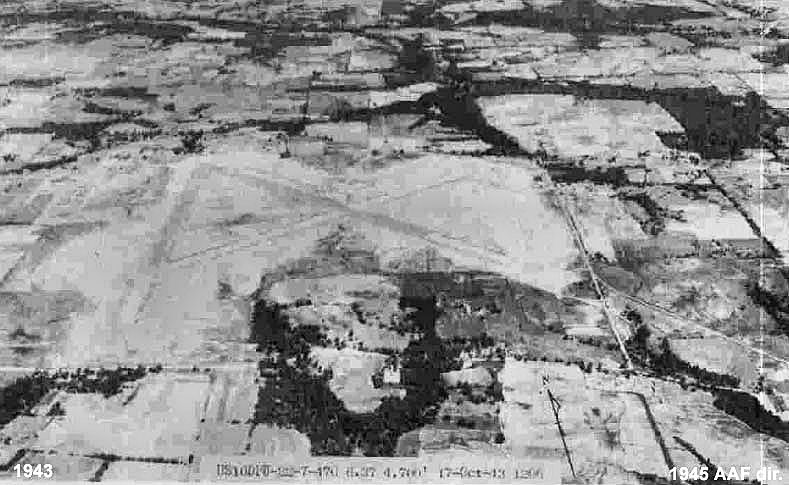
North to south looking oblique aerial photo of Pounds AAF, Texas, 17 October 1943.

- Sub-base Detachment, Tyler Army Air Field, 3 April 1943

Redesignated: Headquarters and Headquarters Squadron, Pounds Army Air Field, 25 November 1943
Redesignated: 362d Army Air Forces Base Unit (Training), Squadron "A", 1 May 1944 – 30 January 1945

- 344th Bombardment Group (B-26 Marauder)

494th Bombardment Squadron (Medium), 10 September – 15 November 1943
495th Bombardment Squadron (Medium), 10 September-15 November 1943

- 409th Bombardment Group (A-20G Havoc)

642d Bombardment Squadron (Light), 1 December 1943 – 16 December 1943
643d Bombardment Squadron (Light), 1 December 1943 – 16 December 1943

- 159th Liaison Squadron (Commando), 25 March 1944 – 1 June 1944, Stinson L-5
- 11th Tactical Reconnaissance Squadron, 17 April 1944 – 12 July 1944, F-10 (B-25) Mitchell
- 1st Reconnaissance Squadron (Special) (later 41st Photo Reconnaissance Squadron), 24 May 1944 – 7 December 1944, F-7 (A-20) Havoc
- 161st Liaison Squadron, 10 July 1944 – 30 July 1944; 30 September 1944 – 19 November 1944, Stinson L-5

== See also ==
- Texas World War II Army Airfields
