= 324th Expeditionary Reconnaissance Squadron =

324th Expeditionary Reconnaissance Squadron

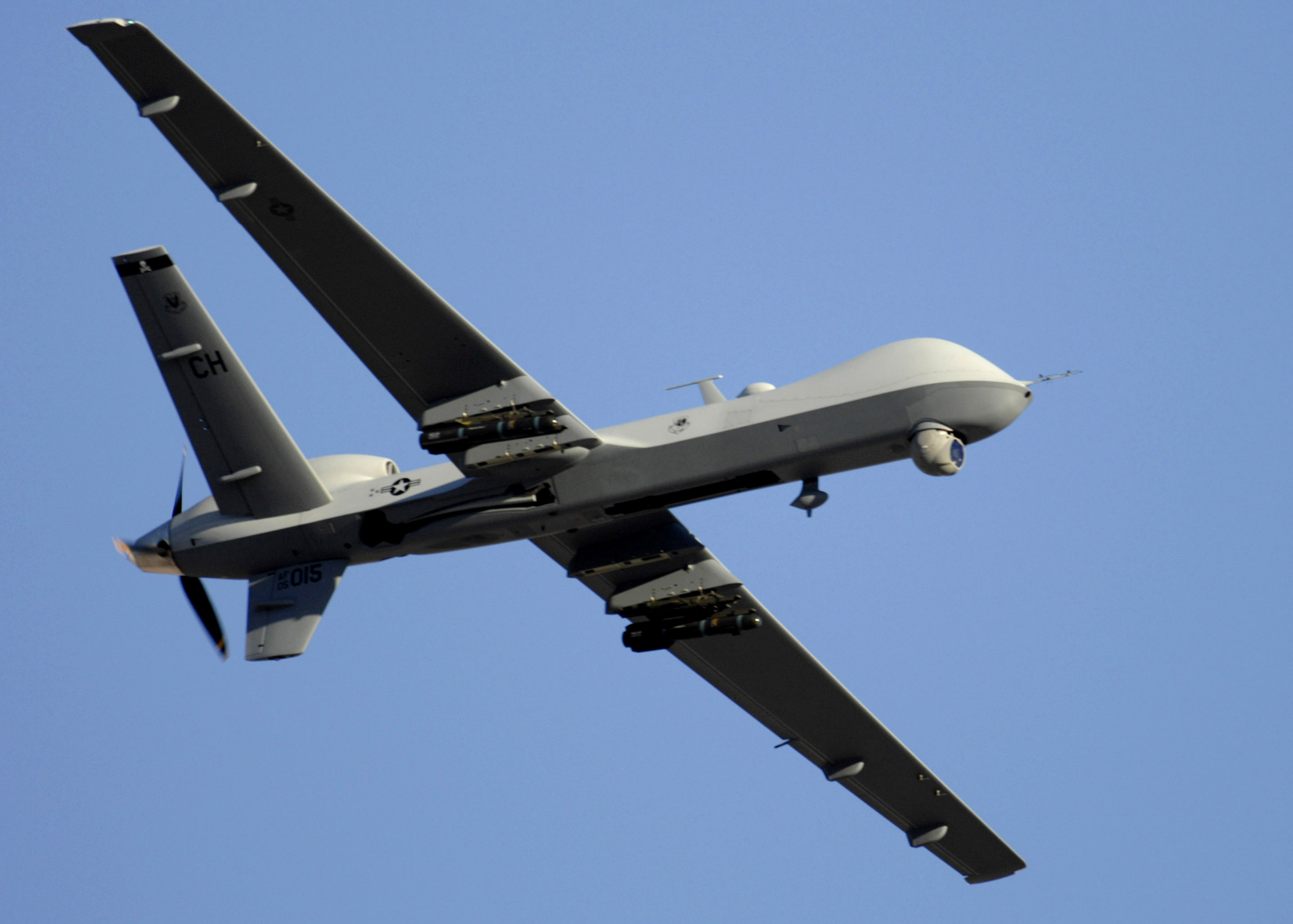
- MQ-9 Reaper as operated by the squadron
- Active: 1942–1945; 1947–1957; 2009; 2010; 2011–
- Country: United States
- Branch: United States Air Force
- Role: Reconnaissance
- Part of: United States Air Forces Europe
- Garrison/HQ: Naval Air Station Sigonella
- Mottos: Veni Vidi vici (Latin for 'I Came, I Saw, I Conquered')
- Engagements: European Theater of Operations
- Decorations: Distinguished Unit Citation; Air Force Outstanding Unit Award

Insignia
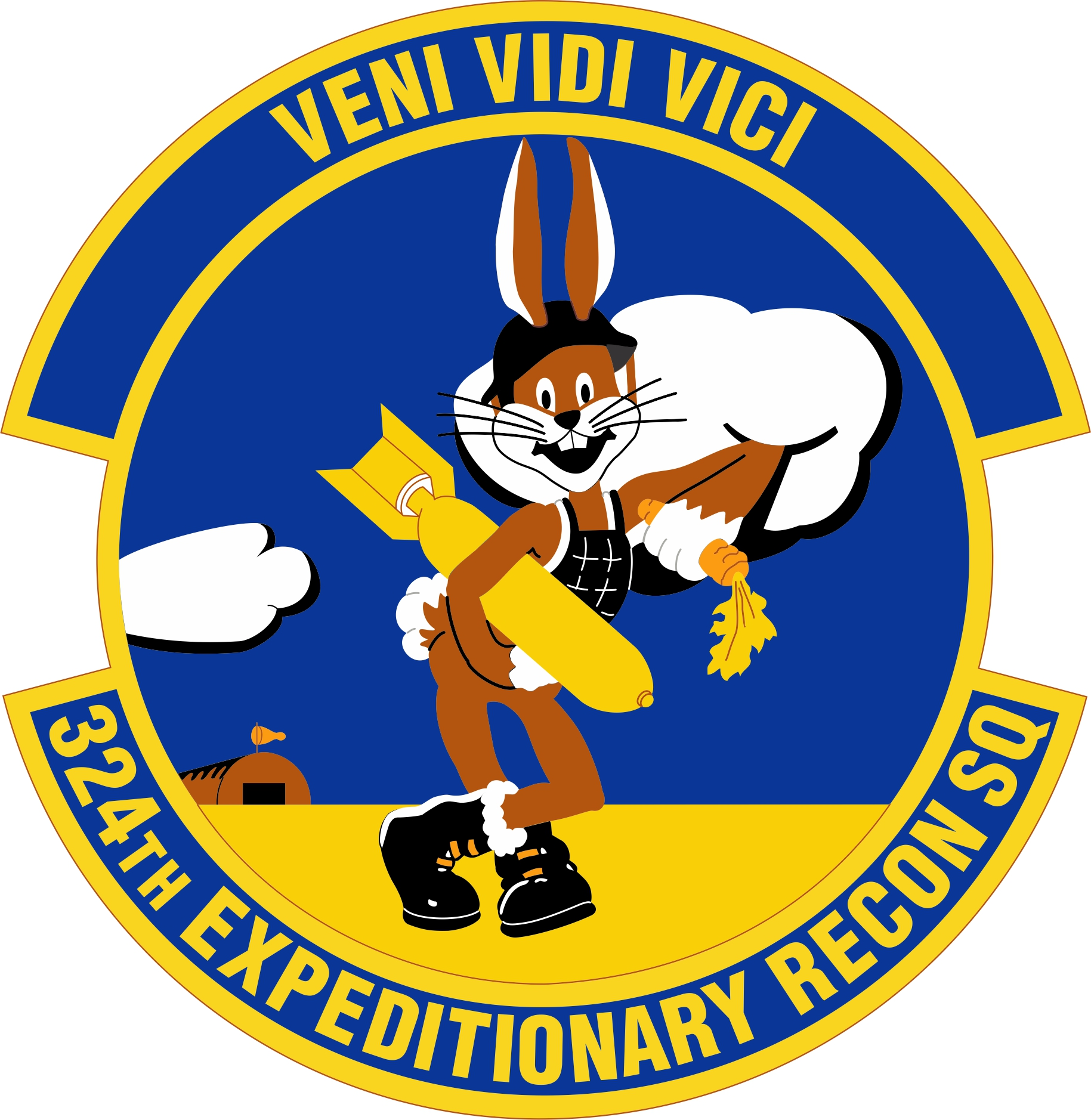
- 324 Expeditionary Reconnaissance Sq emblem

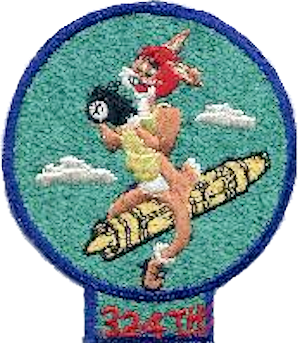
- Patch with 324th Strategic Reconnaissance Squadron emblem (Note: Approved 24 August 1953. Description: On and over a turquoise blue disc with white clouds, a caricatured brown and white rabbit wearing a red jet helmet, yellow flak vest, and brown flying boots, holding a black camera and astride a gold jet engine.)

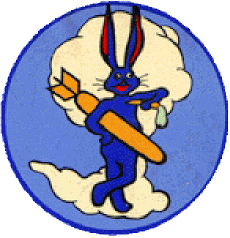
- 324th Bombardment Squadron emblem
- World War II Tail and Fuselage Codes: Triangle A, DF

The 324th Expeditionary Reconnaissance Squadron is a provisional United States Air Force unit. It is assigned to the 409th Air Expeditionary Group at Naval Air Station Sigonella, Italy.

The squadron was first activated in 1942 as the 324th Bombardment Squadron. After training in the United States, it deployed to the European Theater of Operations, where it participated in participated in the strategic bombing campaign against Germany from late 1942 until V-E Day, earning two Distinguished Unit Citations. Following the end of the war, it returned to the United States and was inactivated in November 1945.

The unit was activated as the 324th Reconnaissance Squadron under Strategic Air Command in 1947. The following year it moved to McGuire Air Force Base and began to equip with bombers modified for long range reconnaissance. It continued in the strategic reconnaissance role until 1957, when it was inactivated.

In 2009, the squadron was converted to provisional status as the 324th Expeditionary Reconnaissance Squadron and assigned to United States Air Forces Europe to activate or inactivate as needed.

== History ==
=== World War II ===
==== Organization and training in the United States ====
The squadron was first activated on 15 April 1942 at Harding Field as the 324th Bombardment Squadron, one of the three original bombardment squadrons of the 91st Bombardment Group. (Note: The group was also assigned a reconnaissance squadron, but this unit was quickly redesignated as the group's fourth bombardment squadron. Maurer, Combat Squadrons, pp. 490–91.) It was equipped with the Boeing B-17 Flying Fortress. It completed First Phase training at MacDill Field under Third Air Force, with Second and Third Phase training at Walla Walla Army Air Field under Second Air Force in Washington. The squadron's ground echelon left for Fort Dix in early September 1942, then boarded the RMS Queen Mary for transport to England. The air echelon moved to Gowen Field, Idaho on 24 August 1942, and began receiving new B-17s there. It becan flying them from Dow Field, Maine in September, although it was not fully equipped with new aircraft until October.

==== Combat in Europe ====
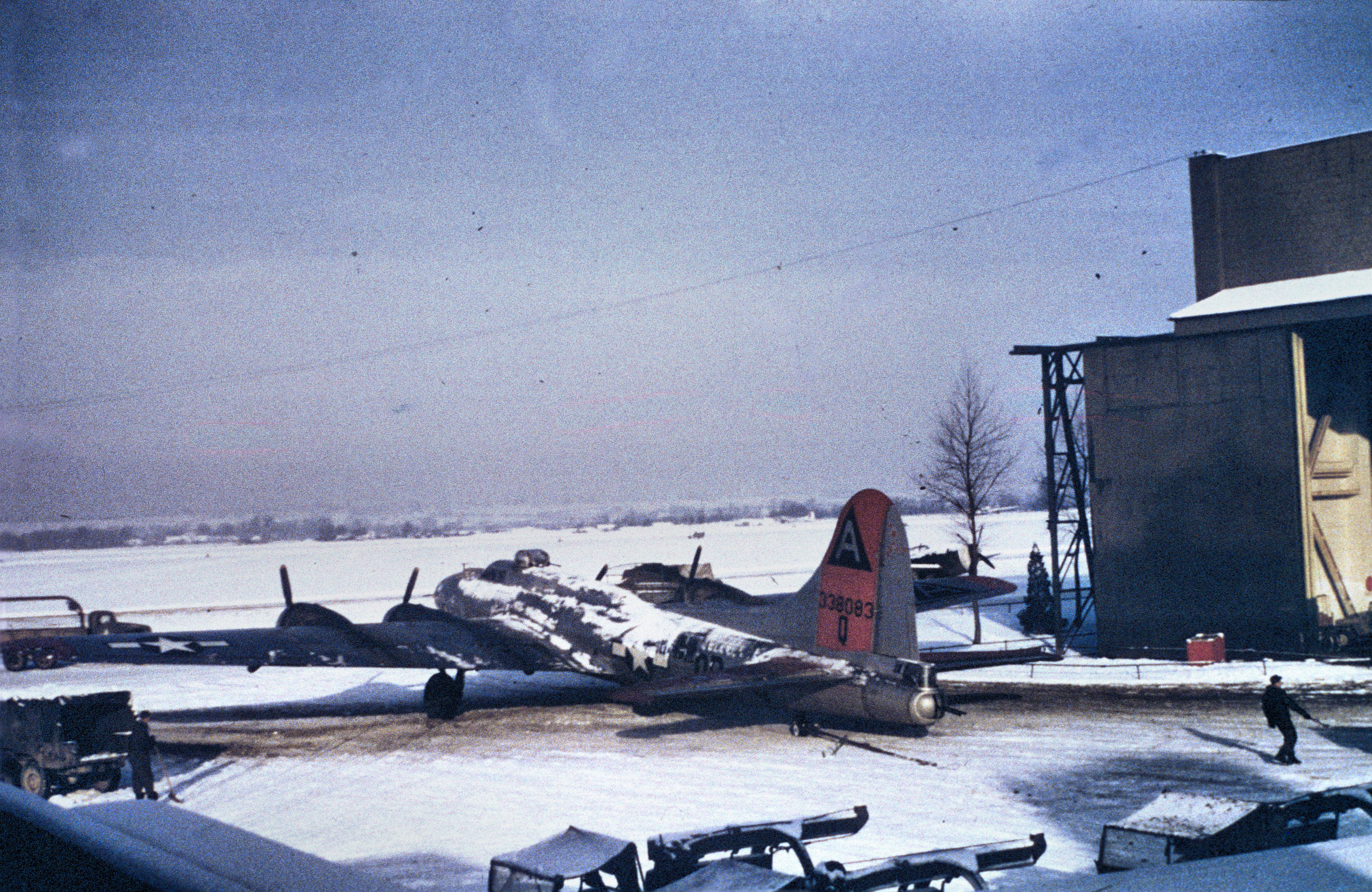
91st Bombardment Group B-17 at RAF Bassingbourn

The ground echelon was established temporarily at RAF Kimbolton by 13 September 1942. However, the runways at Kimbolton were not up to handling heavy bombers, and the unit moved to what would be its permanent station in the European Theater of Operations, RAF Bassingbourn, on 14 October 1942. Bassingbourn had been a prewar Royal Air Force station, so the squadron found itself in more comfortable quarters than most of its contemporaries. The squadron primarily engaged in the strategic bombing campaign against Germany, and flew its first mission on 7 November, an attack against submarine pens at Brest, France.

Until the middle of 1943, The squadron concentrated its attacks on naval targets, including submarine pens, dockyards, ship construction facilities and harbors, although it also struck airfields, factories, and communications facilities. On 27 January 1943, the unit attacked the Kriegsmarine yard at Wilhelmshaven as part of the first penetration by bombers of VIII Bomber Command to a target in Germany. On 4 March 1943, it attacked marshalling yards at Hamm, Germany despite adverse weather and heavy enemy opposition. For this action, it was awarded its first Distinguished Unit Citation (DUC).

From the middle of 1943 to the end of the war, the squadron concentrated on attacks on German aviation, including attacks on aircraft factories, including ones at Oranienburg and Brussels; airfields at Oldenburg and Villacoublay; the ball bearing plants at Schweinfurt; chemical plants at Leverkusen and Peenemunde; and industrial facilities in Ludwigshafen, Frankfurt am Main and Wilhemshaven. As part of this attack on the German aircraft industry, on 11 January, the squadron penetrated into central Germany, despite bad weather, poor fighter cover, and strong attacks by enemy interceptor aircraft, the unit succeeded in bombing its target, earning a second DUC.

The squadron also performed interdiction and air support missions. It helped prepare for Operation Overlord, the invasion of Normandy, by bombing gun emplacements and troop concentrations near the beachhead area. It aided Operation Cobra, the breakout at Saint Lo, in July 1944 by attacking enemy troop positions. It supported troops on the front lines near Caen in August 1944 and attacked lines of communications near the battlefield during the Battle of the Bulge in December 1944 and January 1945. It attacked airfields, bridges, and railroads to support Operation Lumberjack, the push across the Rhine in Germany, in 1945.

Following V-E Day, the squadron evacuated prisoners of war from German camps. The first B-17 left Bassingbourn for the United States on 27 May 1945. The ground echelon sailed aboard the RMS Queen Elizabeth on 24 June 1945. The squadron was reestablished at Drew Field, Florida in early July, with the intention of deploying it to the Pacific, but it was not fully manned or equipped, and inactivated on 7 November 1945.

=== Strategic reconnaissance ===
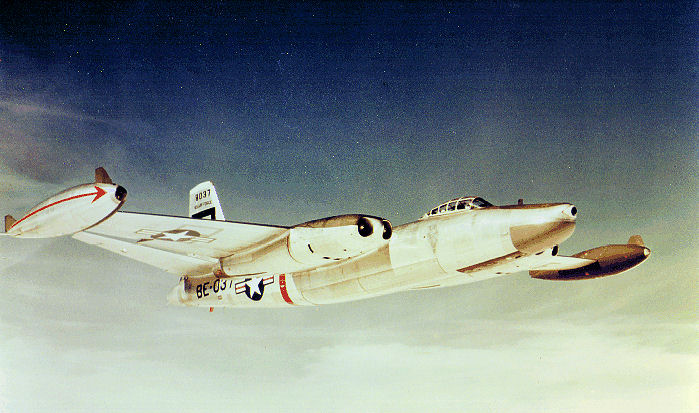
91st Wing RB-45C in flight (Note: Airplane is North American RB-45C Tornado, serial 48-037. After serving with the wing it was transferred to the 19th Tactical Reconnaissance Squadron in England. it was struck off charge at Norton Air Force Base, California on 17 November 1957. Dirkx, Marco (18 March 2024). "1948 USAF Serial Numbers". Joe Baugher’s Serial Number List.)

The squadron was reactivated in July 1947 at Andrews Field, Maryland as the 324th Reconnaissance Squadron. It moved to McGuire Air Force Base, New Jersey in July 1948, where it was redesignated the 324th Strategic Reconnaissance Squadron in November. The squadron does not appear to have been operational until 1949, when it began equipping with both bomber and reconnaissance models of the Flying Fortress and Boeing B-29 Superfortress. In October 1949 it moved to Barksdale Air Force Base, Louisiana, where it began to fly the North American RB-45 Tornado in 1950.

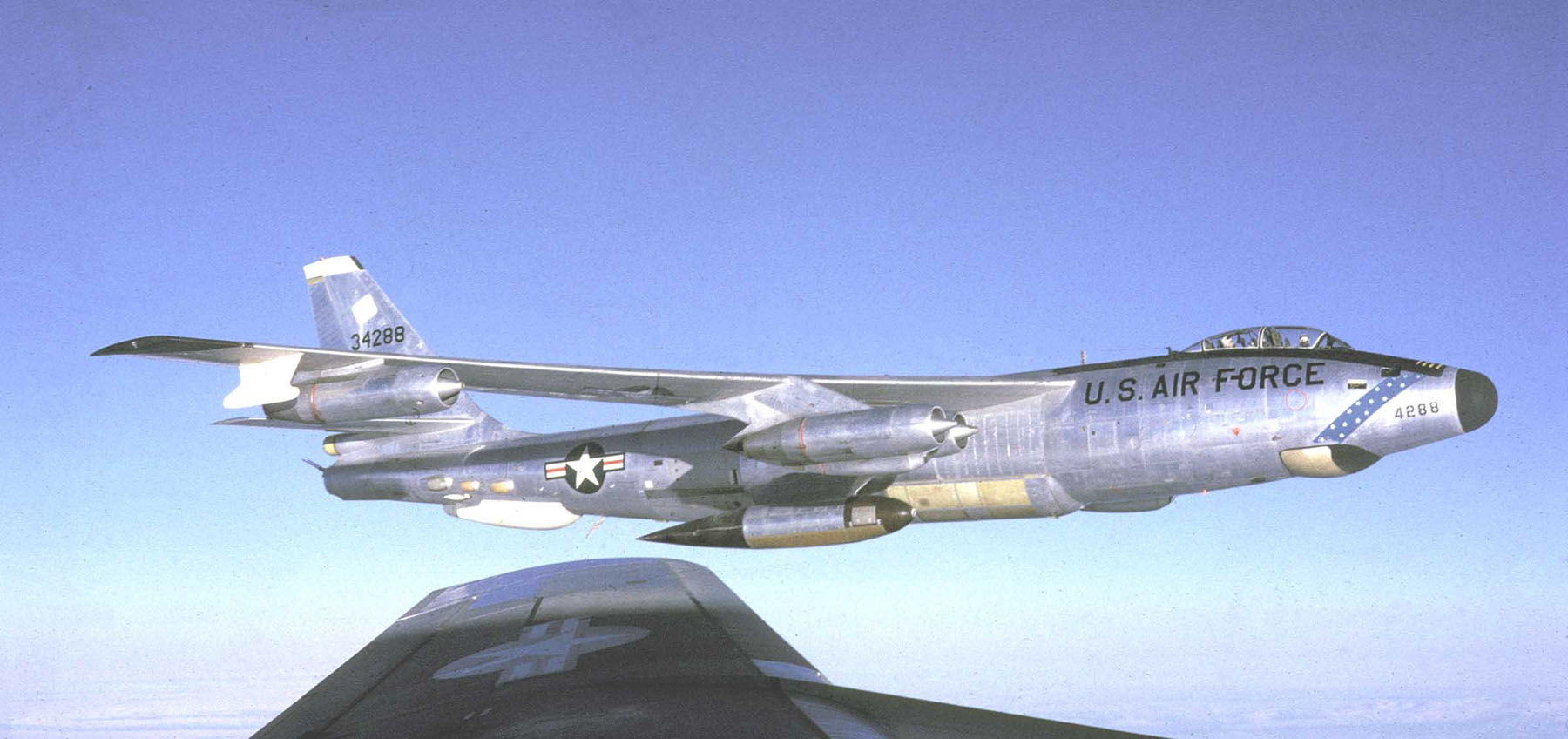
RB-47 Stratojet in flight

Strategic Air Command (SAC) decided its wing commanders should focus on combat operations, while the air base group commander would manage base housekeeping functions. Under this plan the wing's combat squadrons reported directly to the wing and the intermediate group was eliminated. In February 1951, the 91st Group became nonoperational and the squadron was assigned directly to the 91st Strategic Reconnaissance Wing. In September 1951 the squadron moved to Lockbourne Air Force Base, Ohio, where it re-equipped with Boeing RB-47E Stratojets in 1953. The squadron frequently provided crews and aircraft to detachments of the 91st Wing that performed reconnaissance in overseas areas. Between August and November 1956, most of the squadron was deployed overseas and was operationally controlled by another organization. It continued worldwide reconnaissance missions until inactivating in November 1957.

=== Provisional unit ===
In 2009, the squadron was converted to provisional status as the 324th Expeditionary Reconnaissance Squadron and assigned to United States Air Forces Europe to activate or inactivate as needed. It was active at Ramstein Air Base, Germany from July to December 2009 and again from March to June of 2010. It was active agan at Naval Station Rota, Spain from July to October 2010. It was most recently activated at Naval Air Station Sigonella, Sicily, Italy in March 2011, and has been part of the 409th Air Expeditionary Group since 2012. It performs launch and recovery operations supporting intelligence, surveillance and reconnaissance aircraft; first with the General Atomics MQ-1 Predator and currently the General Atomics MQ-9 Reaper. The 324th provides the Commander of Air Forces Africa with real-time intelligence, surveillance, and reconnaissance and kinetic strike in support of counter-terrorism campaign plans through MQ-9 launch, recovery and maintenance.

== Lineage ==
- Constituted as the 324th Bombardment Squadron (Heavy) on 28 January 1942

Activated on 15 April 1942
Redesignated 324th Bombardment Squadron, Heavy on 10 August 1943
Inactivated on 7 November 1945
Redesignated 324th Reconnaissance Squadron on 11 June 1947
Activated on 1 July 1947
Redesignated 324th Strategic Reconnaissance Squadron on 10 November 1948
Redesignated 324th Strategic Reconnaissance Squadron, Medium on 6 July 1950
Inactivated on 8 November 1957
Converted to provisional status, redesignated 324th Expeditionary Reconnaissance Squadron on 25 June 2009 and assigned to United States Air Forces Europe to activate or inactivate as needed

Activated on 2 July 2009
Inactivated on 9 December 2009
Activated on 26 March 2010
Inactivated on 1 June 2010
Activated on 28 July 2010
Inactivated on 1 October 2010
Activated on 25 March 2011

=== Assignments ===
- 91st Bombardment Group, 15 April 1942 – 7 November 1945
- 91st Reconnaissance Group (later 91st Strategic Reconnaissance Group), 1 July 1947 (attached to 91st Strategic Reconnaissance Wing after 10 February 1951)
- 91st Strategic Reconnaissance Wing, 28 May 1952 – 8 November 1957
- 404th Air Expeditionary Group, 2 July 2009 – 9 December 2009
- 404th Air Expeditionary Group, 26 March 2010 – 1 June 2010
- 404th Air Expeditionary Group, 28 July 2010 – 1 October 2010
- United States Air Forces in Europe, 25 March 2011 (attached to Seventeenth Air Force)
- 404th Air Expeditionary Group, 30 March 2010 (attached to 100th Operations Group)
- 409th Air Expeditionary Group, 1 March 2012

=== Stations ===
- Harding Field, Louisiana, 15 April 1942
- MacDill Field, Florida, 13 May 1942
- Walla Walla Army Air Base, Washington, 22 June – 24 August 1942
- RAF Kimbolton (AAF-117), England, 13 September 1942 (ground echelon), early October 1942 (air echelon)
- RAF Bassingbourn (AAF-121), England, 14 October 1942 – 23 June 1945
- Drew Field, Florida, 3 July – 7 November 1945
- Andrews Field (later Andrews Air Force Base), Maryland, 1 July 1947
- McGuire Air Force Base, New Jersey, 19 July 1948
- Barksdale Air Force Base, Louisiana, 1 October 1949
- Lockbourne Air Force Base, Ohio, 11 September 1951 – 8 November 1957
- Ramstein Air Base, Germany, 2 July 2009 – 9 December 2009
- Ramstein Air Base, Germany, 26 March 2010 – 1 June 2010
- Naval Station Rota, Spain, 28 July 2010 – 1 October 2010
- Naval Air Station Sigonella, Sicily, Italy, 25 March 2011

=== Aircraft ===
- Boeing B-17 Flying Fortress, 1942–1945
- Boeing RB-17 Flying Fortress, 1948–1949
- Boeing RB-29 Superfortress, 1949–1950
- North American RB-45 Tornado, 1950–1953
- Boeing RB-47E Stratojet, 1953–1957
- General Atomics MQ-1B Predator, 2011-unknown
- General Atomics MQ-9A Reaper, 2011-unknown

=== Awards and campaigns ===
Award streamer	Award	Dates	Notes
	Presidential Unit Citation	Hamm, Germany 4 March 1943	324th Bombardment Squadron
	Presidential Unit Citation	Germany, 11 January 1944	324th Bombardment Squadron
	Air Force Outstanding Unit Award	8 September 1953–8 November 1957	324th Strategic Reconnaissance Squadron

Campaign Streamer	Campaign	Dates	Notes
	Air Offensive, Europe	13 September 1942–5 June 1944	324th Bombardment Squadron
	Air Combat, EAME Theater	13 September 1942–11 May 1945	324th Bombardment Squadron
	Normandy	6 June 1944–24 July 1944	324th Bombardment Squadron
	Northern France	25 July 1944–14 September 1944	324th Bombardment Squadron
	Rhineland	15 September 1944–21 March 1945	324th Bombardment Squadron
	Ardennes-Alsace	16 December 1944–25 January 1945	324th Bombardment Squadron
	Central Europe	22 March 1944–21 May 1945	324th Bombardment Squadron

== See also ==
- B-17 Flying Fortress units of the United States Army Air Forces
- List of B-29 Superfortress operators
- List of B-47 units of the United States Air Force
- List of United States Air Force reconnaissance squadrons
