= Tyler Pounds Regional Airport =

Tyler Pounds Regional Airport (former Pounds Army Airfield)

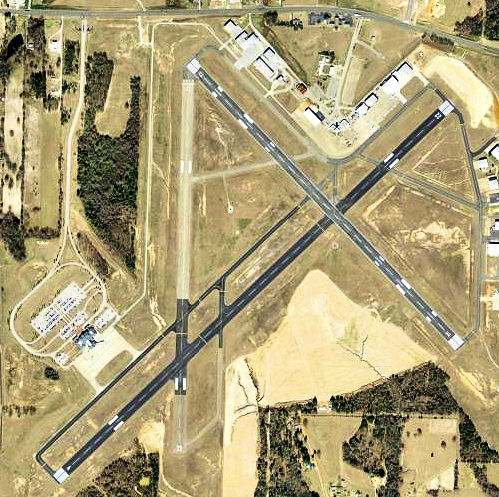
- USGS 2006 orthophoto
- IATA: TYR; ICAO: KTYR; FAA LID: TYR

Summary
- Airport type: Public
- Owner: City of Tyler
- Serves: Tyler, Texas
- Opened: June 28, 1930; 96 years ago
- Elevation AMSL: 544 ft / 166 m
- Coordinates: 32°21′14″N 095°24′10″W
- Website: Official website

Map

Runways
Direction	Length		Surface
Direction	ft	m	Surface
4/22	8,334	2,540	Asphalt
13/31	5,200	1,585	Asphalt
17/35	4,832	1,473	Asphalt

Statistics (2011)
- Aircraft operations: 41,085
- Based aircraft: 152
- Source: Federal Aviation Administration

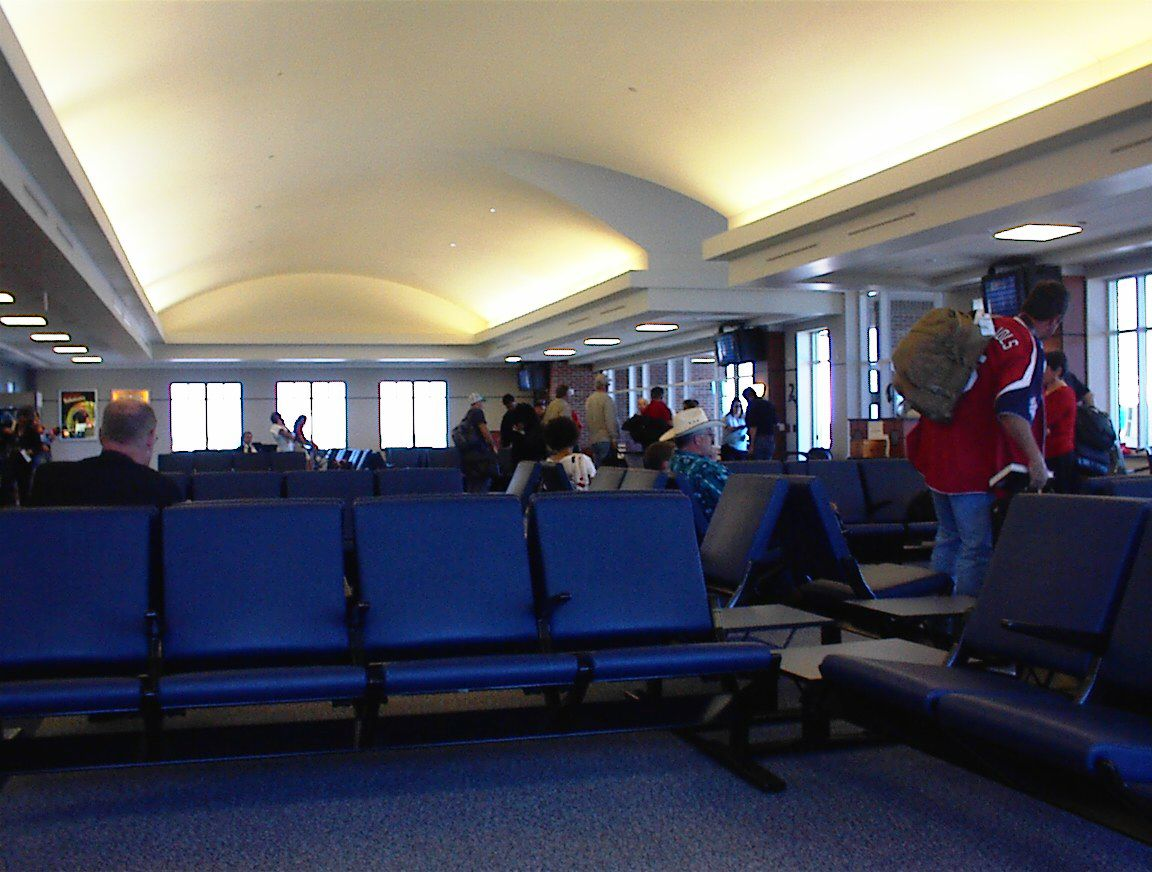
Gate area, 9 April 2006

Tyler Pounds Regional Airport (IATA: TYR, ICAO: KTYR, FAA LID: TYR) is a city-owned, public-use airport located 3 miles (4.8 km; 2.6 nmi) west of Tyler, in Smith County, Texas, United States.

The National Plan of Integrated Airport Systems for 2011–2015 called it a "primary commercial service" airport. Federal Aviation Administration records show 76,168 passenger boardings (enplanements) in calendar year 2008, 73,841 in 2009, and 74,357 in 2010.

The airport has been expanding to meet goals in the Tyler Master Plan; on August 17, 2002, the airport opened a new terminal building, doubling its space. Tyler is a large center for general aviation, with three public parking lots for general aviation.

== History ==
see: Pounds Army Airfield for its World War II use

The airport opened in November 1929 as Tyler Municipal Airport. During World War II, the airfield was used by the United States Army Air Forces as a training base and renamed Pounds Field after Lieutenant Jack Windham Pounds. At the end of the war, the airfield was turned over to local government for civil use and became Tyler Pounds Regional Airport.

=== Historical airline service ===
Airline service at Tyler began in the 1930s. By July 1935, Delta Air Lines included the city on a Dallas–Atlanta route and later operated Douglas DC-3 service linking Tyler with Dallas Love Field, Shreveport, and Atlanta before withdrawing in 1956.

Mid-Continent Airlines served Tyler beginning in the 1940s with DC-3 flights connecting Houston Hobby Airport with cities in Texas, Oklahoma, Missouri, and the Upper Midwest. The carrier was acquired by Braniff International Airways in 1952, which briefly continued service before discontinuing it in 1953.

Trans-Texas Airways began service in the 1940s with DC-3 flights to Dallas and Houston, later introducing Convair 240 and Convair 600 aircraft. After becoming Texas International Airlines in 1969, it operated turboprop service to Dallas/Fort Worth International Airport, Houston Intercontinental Airport, and other regional destinations before leaving Tyler in 1978.

Commuter airlines expanded service during the 1970s and 1980s. Metroflight Airlines, later an American Eagle affiliate for American Airlines, operated frequent de Havilland Canada DHC-6 Twin Otter and Short 330 flights to DFW. Competing regional service was later provided by American Eagle and Delta Connection (operated by Atlantic Southeast Airlines) using Saab 340 and Embraer turboprops.

In the 1990s and 2000s, Continental Express operated turboprop service to Houston. Following Continental’s 2012 merger with United Airlines, flights became United Express; United ended service in April 2016, citing reduced demand linked to the energy sector.

From July 2019 to April 2020, Frontier Airlines operated mainline Airbus A320 nonstop service to Denver, the largest aircraft type to provide scheduled passenger service at Tyler.

=== Museum ===
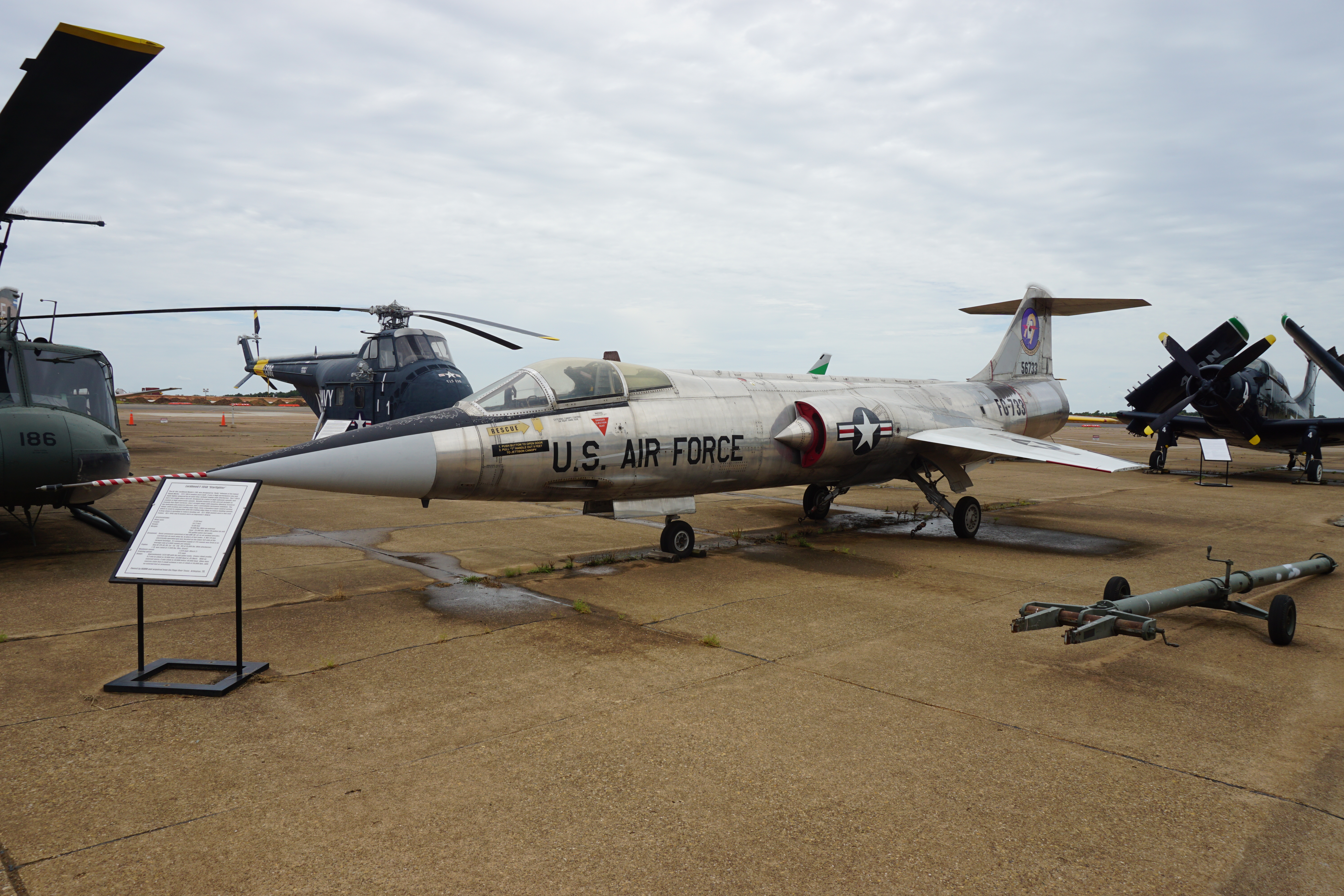
Lockheed F-104A Starfighter at the Historic Aviation Memorial Museum

The Historic Aviation Memorial Museum, an aviation museum located at the airport, rented and moved into the former Tyler passenger terminal that had been closed since 2002. The museum has a number of military jet fighters on display among other exhibits, and also flies and maintains two Russian-manufactured MiG-17F jets based at the airport.

== Facilities and aircraft ==
The airport covers 1,200 acres (490 ha; 4.9 km^{2}) at an elevation of 544 ft (166 m). It has three asphalt runways:

- 4/22 is 8,334 by 150 ft (2,540 by 46 m)
- 13/31 is 5,200 by 150 ft (1,585 by 46 m)
- 18/36 is 4,832 by 150 ft (1,473 by 46 m)

For the 12-month period ending July 31, 2011, the airport had 48,677 aircraft operations, average 133 per day: 83% general aviation, 14% air taxi, 2% airline, and 1% military; 152 aircraft were then based at the airport: 60% single-engine, 22% jet, 16% multi-engine, and 2% helicopter.

== Airline and destination ==
=== Passenger ===
Airlines	Destinations
American Eagle	Dallas/Fort Worth

== Accidents and incidents ==
- July 13, 2017: Piper PA-31T Cheyenne owned by T-210 HOLDINGS LLC: The aircraft went down as it was leaving the airport, headed to Midland Airpark. It crashed a quarter-mile south of the airport, with two fatalities.

== See also ==
- List of airports in Texas
