= 409th Air Expeditionary Group =

409th Air Expeditionary Group

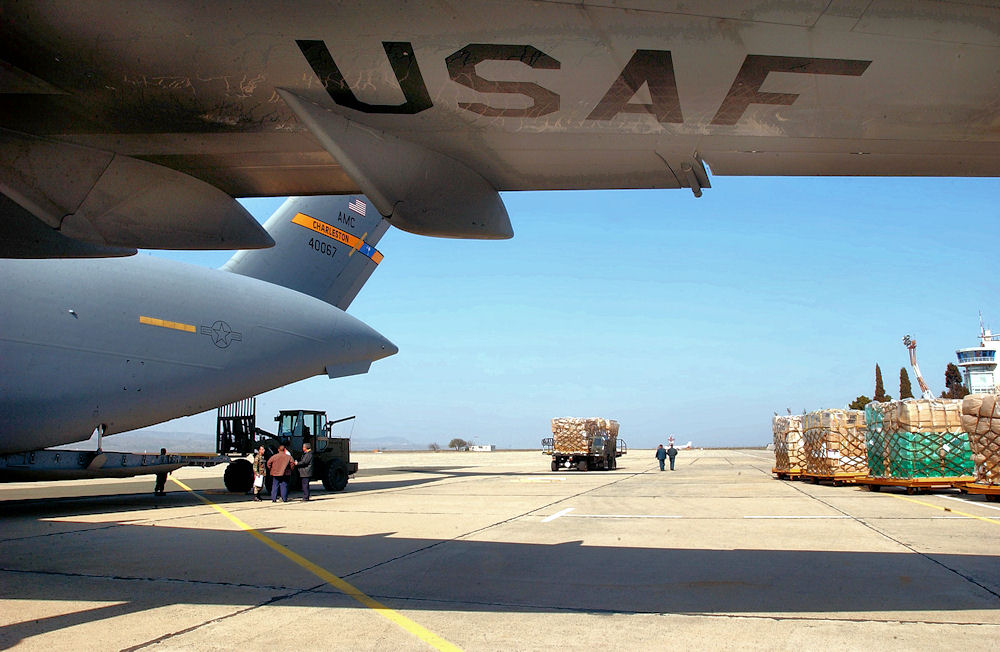
- Airmen from the 409th Air Expeditionary Group at Camp Sarafovo, Bulgaria load humanitarian cargo onto a C-17 Globemaster III (Note: The C-17 landed at Burgas Airport on its way to deliver humanitarian aid to Iraq. KC-10 Extenders from McGuire AFB were deployed to Burgas Airport and nearby Camp Sarafovo, Bulgaria, to support tanker operations with the 409th Air Expeditionary Group in support of Operation Iraqi Freedom.)
- Active: 1943–1945; 2001–unknown; 2003; 2005; 2007; 2008; 2011–unknown
- Country: United States
- Branch: United States Air Force
- Role: Air epeditionary operations
- Part of: United States Air Forces in Europe – Air Forces Africa: Third Air Force; 406th Air Expeditionary Wing
- Engagements: European Theater of Operations
- Decorations: Air Force Outstanding Unit Award

Insignia
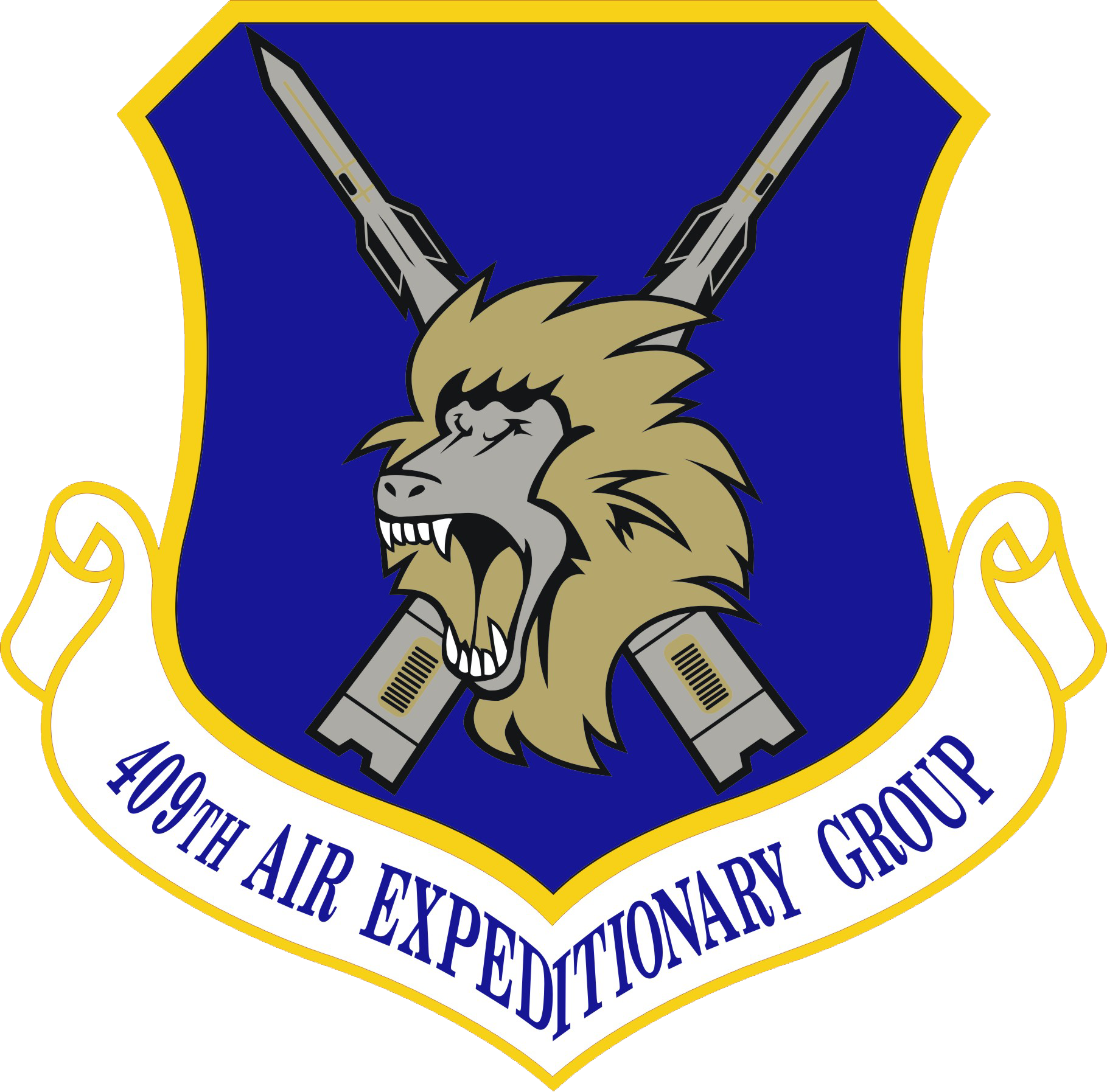
- 409th Air Expeditionary Group emblem
- Group marking during World War II: Yellow band on trailing edge of rudder

The 409th Air Expeditionary Group is a provisional United States Air Force unit assigned to United States Air Forces Europe (USAFE), which may activate or inactivate the group as needed at any time.

The group was first activated in June 1943 during World War II as the 409th Bombardment Group. After moving to Europe, it served in combat with Ninth Air Force, flying Douglas A-20 Havoc, and later Douglas A-26 Invader light bombers Europe from the spring of 1944 through V-E Day. The group returned to the United States in the summer of 1945 and was inactivated in November 1945.

The 409th was reactivated in 2001 as an air expeditionary unit under USAFE at Camp Sarafovo, Bulgaria. It became a support and air refueling unit in support of Operation Iraqi Freedom (Operation Enduring Freedom??) using six McDonnell Douglas KC-10 Extender aircraft deployed from McGuire Air Force Base, New Jersey to help keep coalition aircraft fueled and flying on their air routes through Bulgaria and on to the theater of war. The group has subsequently been activated to support several humanitarian operations.

Air Force (magazine) notes in its 2012/13 annual survey of units that the group operated Intelligence, surveillance and reconnaissance (ISR) aircraft from unspecified locations in the United States Air Forces Africa area of responsibility.

== Units ==
The 409th AEG is currently made up of:

- 324th Expeditionary Reconnaissance Squadron (MQ-9 Reaper) (Naval Air Station Sigonella, Italy)
- 409th Expeditionary Security Forces Squadron (Agadez, Niger)
- 724th Expeditionary Air Base Squadron (Nigerien Air Base 201, Agadez, Niger)
- 768th Expeditionary Air Base Squadron (Nigerien Air Base 101, Niger)

== History ==
=== World War II ===
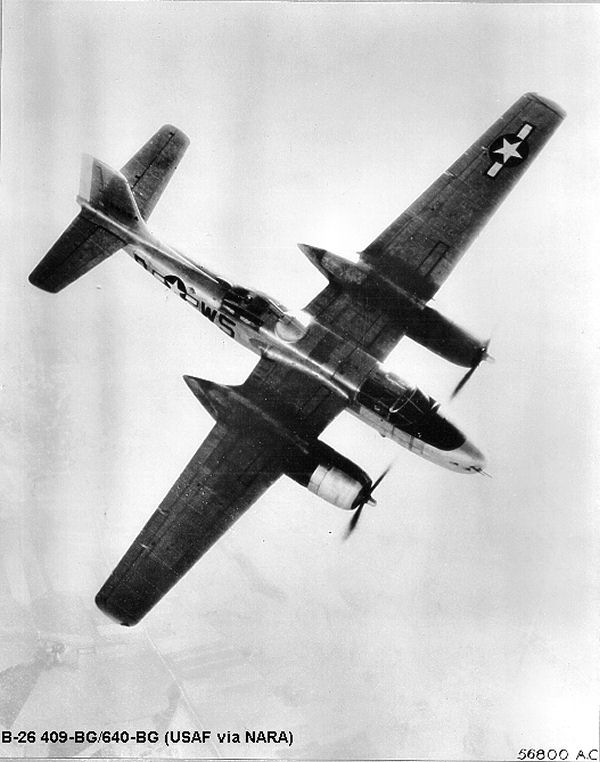
Douglas A/B-26 Invader of the 640th Bomb Squadron.

The group was constituted as the 409th Bombardment Group (Light) on 1 June 1943, activated the same day at Will Rogers Field, Oklahoma and assigned the 640th, 641st, 642d and 643d Bombardment Squadrons flying Douglas A-20 Havocs. However, it did not receive manning until 20 June and it was 3 August before the group had sufficient manning or equipment to begin training. The group trained with its A-20s until 10 February 1944 when it moved to RAF Little Walden, Essex, in the United Kingdom, arriving on 7 March 1944, when it became part of Ninth Air Force. On 13 April, it flew its first combat mission against a target in France.

The 409th was originally trained in low-level attack missions. However, the group was busy flying medium-altitude bombing runs from 10,000 ft. Over 100 missions were flown by the group, attacking coastal defenses, V-1 and V-2 launch sites, airfields and other targets in France in preparation for Operation Overlord, the invasion of Normandy. The group supported ground forces during the Battle of Normandy by hitting gun batteries, rail lines, bridges, communications, and other objectives. During July 1944, it aided the Allied offensive at Caen and Operation Cobra, the breakout at Saint-Lô with attacks on enemy troops, flak positions, fortified villages, and supply dumps.

The group moved to Bretigny Airfield, France on 10 September to support United States Third Army's advance toward Germany. A total of ten aircraft had been lost by the group flying from Little Walden. In December 1944, the group began to convert to the Douglas A-26 Invader, but its upgrade was delayed as it provided close air support during the Battle of the Bulge, attacking lines of communication during December 1944 and January 1945. It flew its A-26s in combat from Bretigny and, after February from Laon-Couvron Air Base, until 3 May 1945, when flew its last mission against an ammunition dump in Czechoslovakia.

After V-E Day, the group began its return to the United States in June and gathered at Seymour Johnson Field North Carolina in August. It moved to Westover Field on 6 October 1945 and was inactivated there on 7 November 1945.

=== Twenty-first Century ===
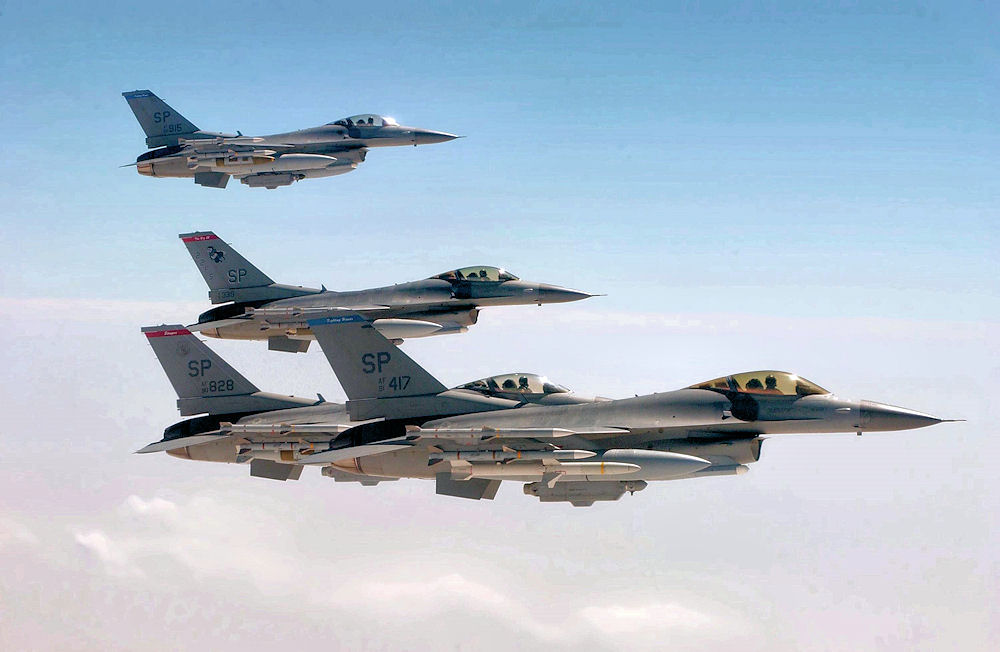
F-16s fly observation formation off the wing of a KC-10 (Note: The F-16s are deployed from Spangdahlem Air Base. KC-10 Extenders were deployed to the 409th Air Expeditionary Group.)

The group was converted to provisional status, redesignated the 409th Air Expeditionary Group and assigned to United States Air Forces Europe, which activated it in November 2001 as an air refueling unit at Camp Sarafovo, Bulgaria as part of the leadup to the Iraq War. It conducted flying operations from Burgas Airport. The 409th Group was responsible for refueling operations in support of the US-led Operation Iraqi Freedom. Its mission included the use of six McDonnell Douglas KC-10 Extender aircraft, deployed from McGuire Air Force Base New Jersey, to help keep coalition aircraft fueled and flying on their air routes through Bulgaria and on to the theater of war. At the time, the 407th Expeditionary Air Refueling Squadron formed part of the group. The 409th was inactivated in June 2003. (Note: The Camp Sarafavo planes included some assigned to Seymour-Johnson Air Force Base. The New Jersey airmen joked casually upon arrival that the tail designator SJ for Seymour Johnson stood for South Jersey instead.)

Later, the group participated in RESCUER/MEDCEUR 03, a regional multinational exercise held in the spirit of "Partnership for Peace" at Vaziani Military Base, Georgia, in September 2003. The United States sponsored the exercise that the Georgians hosted. A U.S. exercise Joint Task Force administered the exercise. It was activated at Vaziani in 2005 for a similar exercise.

In August 2007, the group was activated at Keflavik Air Station, Iceland to act as a command headquarters for elements of the 493d Fighter Squadron and 351st Air Refueling Squadron which were temporarily deployed there.

The following January saw the group active for three months at Accra, Ghana. In 2011, it was activated at Arba Minch in Ethiopia with an air base squadron and with detachments in the Seychelles and Djibouti. In March 2012 it added the 324th Expeditionary Reconnaissance Squadron to its strength.

In 2012, United States Air Forces Africa reported that "[t]he 409th Air Expeditionary Group provides the primary intelligence, surveillance and reconnaissance missions across the [command's] entire area of responsibility from multiple locations as required. The objective is to promote regional security and stability, dissuade conflict and protect U.S. and coalition interests." The group has shared a commander during its most recent activations with the 404th Air Expeditionary Group, which provides expeditionary support units in the same area.

== Lineage ==
- Constituted as the 409th Bombardment Group (Light) on 1 June 1943 and activated

Redesignated 409th Bombardment Group, Light 27 April 1944
Inactivated on 7 November 1945

- Converted to provisional status, redesignated 409th Air Expeditionary Group and allotted to United States Air Forces Europe to activate or inactivate as needed on 5 February 2001

Activated on 15 November 2001
Inactivated 2003
Activated on 5 September 2003
Inactivated on 23 September 2003
Activated on 4 September 2005
Inactivated on 27 September 2005
Activated on 9 August 2007
Inactivated on 20 August 2007
Activated on 30 January 2008
Inactivated on 4 March 2008
Activated on 1 January 2011
Inactivated unknown

=== Assignments ===
- Third Air Force (attached to 56th Bombardment Training Wing), 1 June 1943
- III Bomber Command (attached to II Tactical Air Division), 6 August 1943
- 97th Combat Bombardment Wing (later 97th Bombardment Wing), 7 March 1944
- First Air Force, 15 August 1945 – 7 November 1945
- United States Air Forces Europe to activate or inactivate anytime after November 2001

16th Air Expeditionary Task Force, 15 November 2001– unknown
Attached to Sixteenth Air Force, 5 September 2003 – 23 September 2003
Attached to Sixteenth Air Force, 4 September 2005 -27 September 2005
Attached to 48th Fighter Wing, 9 August 2007 – 20 August 2007
Attached to Third Air Force, 30 January 2008 – 4 March 2008
Attached to Seventeenth Air Force, 1 January 2011
17th Expeditionary Air Force, 1 April 2012 – present

=== Components ===
Squadrons (Note: Components were stationed with group headquarters, except as noted.)

1952-1945

- 640th Bombardment Squadron, 1 June 1943 – 7 November 1945
- 641st Bombardment Squadron, 1 June 1943 – 7 November 1945
- 642d Bombardment Squadron, 1 June 1943 – 7 November 1945
- 643d Bombardment Squadron, 1 June 1943 – 7 November 1945

2001–2005

- 79th Expeditionary Air Refueling Squadron, 2001? – 2003?
- 86th Expeditionary Medical Squadron, 5 September 2003 – 25 September 2003
- 100th Expeditionary Civil Engineer Squadron, 5 September 2003 – 25 September 2003
- 351st Expeditionary Air Refueling Squadron, c. 15 November 2001 – unknown, 9 August 2007 – 20 August 2007
- 407th Expeditionary Air Refueling Squadron, 2001? – 2003?
- 409th Expeditionary Medical Support Squadron, 4 September 2005 – 27 September 2005
- 409th Expeditionary Mission Support Squadron, 4 September 2005 – 27 September 2005

2007–2008

- (see 351st Expeditionary Air Refueling Squadron, above)
- 493d Expeditionary Fighter Squadron, 9 August 2007 – 20 August 2007
- 722d Expeditionary Air Base Squadron, 30 January 2008 – 4 March 2008
- 871st Air Expeditionary Squadron, 30 January 2008 – 4 March 2008

2011 and later

- 33d Expeditionary Special Operations Squadron, 1 January 2011 – unknown
- 324th Expeditionary Reconnaissance Squadron, 1 March 2012 – unknown

Naval Air Station Sigonella, Italy

- 768th Expeditionary Air Base Squadron, 1 January 2011 – unknown

Flight

- 409th Expeditionary Civil Engineer Flight, c. 15 November 2001 – unknown

Detachments

- Detachment 1, 1 January 2011 – unknown

Victoria, Seychelles

- Detachment 2, 1 October 2011 – unknown

Djibouti, Djibouti

=== Aircraft ===
- Douglas A-20 Havoc, 1943–1945
- Douglas A-26 Invader, 1945
- McDonnell Douglas KC-10 Extender, 2003

=== Stations ===
- Will Rogers Field, Oklahoma, 1 June 1943
- Woodward Army Air Field, Oklahoma, 2 October 1943 (Note: Maurer does not give an exact date for the move of the group headquarters, but all four of the group's squadrons moved on 2 October, so this seems the most likely date for the group move. Maurer, Combat Squadrons, pp. 690–692.)
- DeRidder Army Air Base, Louisiana c. 10 December 1943 – 10 February 1944
- RAF Little Walden (AAF-165), Essex, 7 March 1944
- Bretigny Airfield (A-48), France, September 1944
- Laon-Couvron Airfield (A-70), France, February–June 1945
- Seymour Johnson Field, North Carolina, August 1945
- Westover Field, Massachusetts, ca. 6 October – 7 November 1945
- Camp Sarafovo, Bulgaria, 15 November 2001 – unknown
- Vaziani Military Base, Georgia, 5 September 2003 – 25 September 2003
- Vaziani Military Base, Georgia, 4 September 2005 – 27 September 2005
- Keflavik Air Station, 9 August 2007 – 20 August 2007
- Accra, Ghana, 30 January 2008 – 4 March 2008
- Arba Minch, Ethiopia, 1 January 2011 – unknown

=== Award and campaigns ===
Award streamer	Award	Dates	Notes
	Air Force Outstanding Unit Award	1 January 2011–30 June 2011	409th Air Expeditionary Group

== See also ==
- List of United States Air Force Groups
- List of Douglas A-20 Havoc operators
- List of Douglas A-26 Invader operators
