= RAF Little Walden =

Former World War II airfield in Essex

RAF Little Walden USAAF Station 165
- Near Saffron Walden, Essex in England

Site information
- Type: Royal Air Force station
- Code: LL
- Owner: Air Ministry
- Operator: Royal Air Force; United States Army Air Forces
- Controlled by: Eighth Air Force; Ninth Air Force

Location
- Shown within Essex RAF Little Walden (the United Kingdom)
- Coordinates: 52°04′06″N 000°16′00″E

Site history
- Built: 1944
- In use: March 1944 - September 1946
- Battles/wars: European theatre of World War II

Airfield information
Runways
Direction	Length and surface
00/00	Concrete
00/00	Concrete
00/00	Concrete

Royal Air Force Little Walden or more simply RAF Little Walden is a former Royal Air Force station, located north of Saffron Walden, Essex, England.

Construction began in 1942, with the site initially assigned to the Eighth Air Force of the United States Army Air Forces. By the time of opening in March 1944, however, the airfield had been transferred to the Ninth Air Force, who used the site through to September, when it was returned to the Eighth.

The following units were based at Little Walden at some point:

- 56th Fighter Group (Republic P-47 Thunderbolt)
  - 61st Fighter Squadron
  - 62nd Fighter Squadron
  - 63rd Fighter Squadron
- 97th Combat Bombardment Wing (Light)
- 97th Combat Bombardment Wing (Medium)
- 361st Fighter Group (P-47/North American P-51 Mustang)
  - 374th Fighter Squadron
  - 375th Fighter Squadron
  - 376th Fighter Squadron
- 409th Bombardment Group (Ninth Air Force) (Douglas A-20 Havoc)
- 493rd Bombardment Group (Heavy) (Boeing B-17 Flying Fortress)
  - 860th Bombardment Squadron
  - 861st Bombardment Squadron
  - 862d Bombardment Squadron
  - 863rd Bombardment Squadron

Following the war, the airfield was deemed surplus to requirements, and sold. The area returned to agricultural use, and there are few traces of the airfields still visible today.
