= Brétigny-sur-Orge Air Base =

Former air base in Brétigny, France

Brétigny-sur-Orge Air Base Base aérienne 217

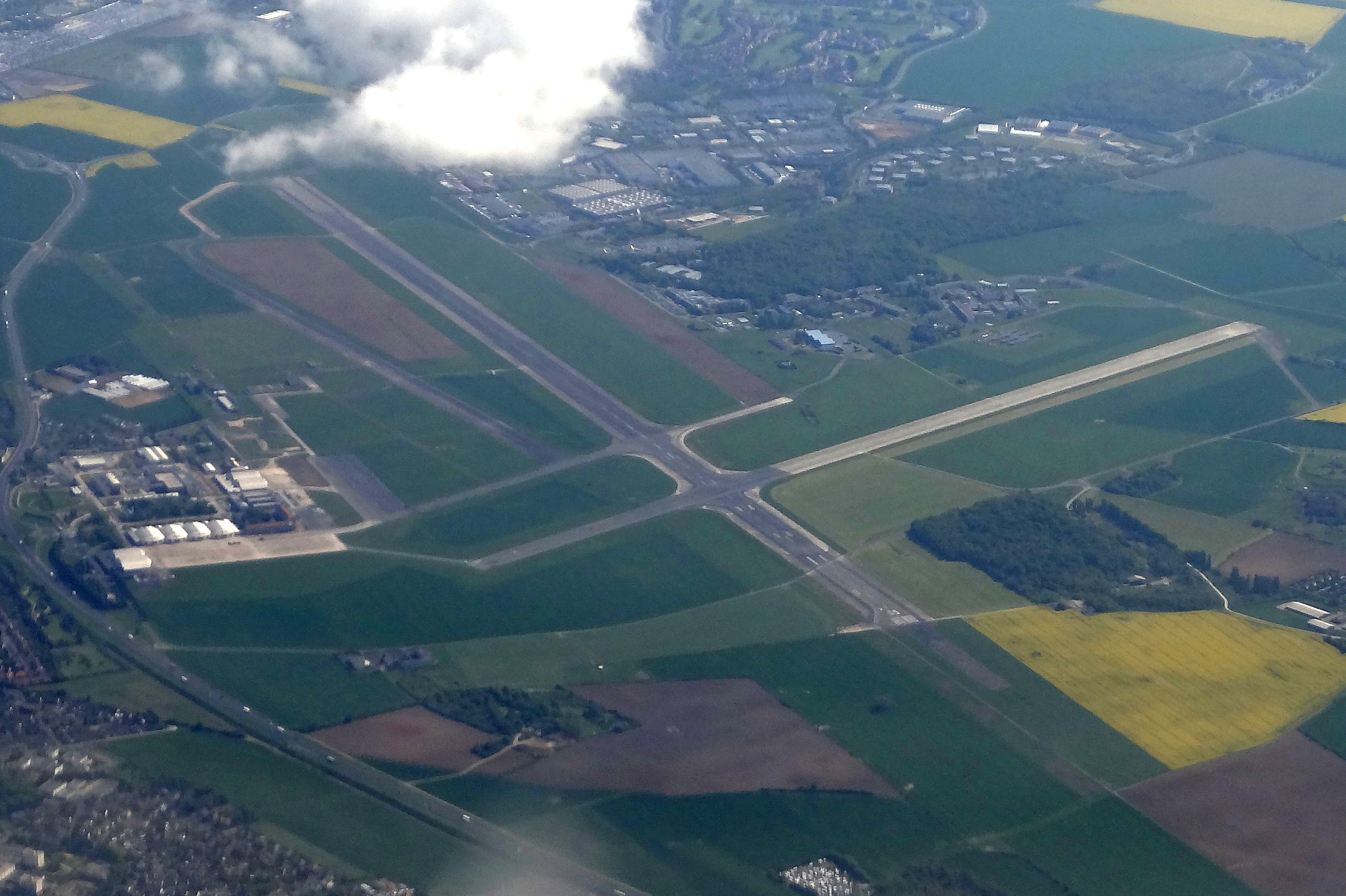
- IATA: none; ICAO: LFPY

Summary
- Owner: Government of France
- Operator: Armée de l'air
- Location: Brétigny, France
- Elevation AMSL: 270 ft (82 m)
- Coordinates: 48°35′48″N 002°19′59″E

Map
- Location of Brétigny-sur-Orge Air Base

Runways
Direction	Length		Surface
Direction	m	ft	Surface
05/23	3,000	9,843	Asphalt
11/29	2,200	7,218	Asphalt

Brétigny-sur-Orge Air Base (French: Base aérienne 217 Bretigny-Sur-Orge) (ICAO: LFPY) is a former French Air Force French: Armée de l'Air (ALA) base. The base is located approximately 2 miles (3.2 km) southeast of Brétigny-sur-Orge; about 17 miles (27 km) south of Paris.

== Units ==
- Integrated structure of maintenance in operational condition of the aeronautical materials of defense.
- Logistic service of the police station of air (SELOCA).
- Squadron Syderec (OVIA).
- Support of OIA (SOCRATE) and OVIA (SIMMAD, BEAD, SYDEREC)

== Aircraft ==
The base has no permanent aircraft assigned, however runway and turnaround service is available for transient aircraft.

== History ==
Brétigny Air Base was built prior to World War II as a French Air Force facility.

=== German use during World War II ===
Seized by the Germans in June 1940 during the Battle of France, Brétigny was used as a Luftwaffe military airfield during the occupation. Known units assigned (all from Luftlotte 3, Fliegerkorps IV):

- Kampfgeschwader 51 (KG 51) 3 November 1940 – 30 March 1941 Junkers Ju 88A (Fuselage Code: 9K+)
- Kampfgeschwader 54 (KG 54) 14 April-26 May 1941 Junkers Ju 88A (Fuselage Code: B3+)
- Kampfgeschwader 30 (KG 30) 8 June 1941-January 1942 Junkers Ju 88A (Fuselage Code: 4D+)
- Kampfgeschwader 6 (KG 6) (Fuselage Code: 3E+)

August 1942-20 March 1944 Junkers Ju 88A
20 March-14 June 1944 Junkers Ju 188A/E
10 July-1 September 1944 Junkers Ju 88A, Junkers Ju 188E
14 July-1 September 1944 Junkers Ju 88A

- Jagdgeschwader 1 (JG 1) 5–17 August 1944 Messerschmitt Bf 109G

KG 51, KG 54 and KG 30 all took part in night bombing raids over England; KG6 also to a lesser degree as fuel shortages began restricting night bomber missions; JG 1 was a day interceptor unit against Eighth Air Force heavy bombers.

It was attacked on several occasions by heavy bombers of both the United States Army Air Force Eighth Air Force during 1943 and early 1944.

=== American use ===
It was liberated by Allied ground forces about 27 August 1944 during the Northern France Campaign. Almost immediately, the USAAF IX Engineering Command 825th Engineer Aviation Battalion began clearing the base of mines and destroyed Luftwaffe aircraft; filling bomb craters in both runways with rubble and a Pierced Steel Planking patch along with repairing operational facilities for use by American aircraft. Subsequently, Brétigny became a USAAF Ninth Air Force combat airfield, designated as "A-48" about 29 August, only a few days after its capture from German forces.

Almost immediately, the repaired base became home to numerous combat units.

- 404th Fighter Group, flew P-47 Thunderbolts from 29 August to 13 September 1944
- 365th Fighter Group flew P-47 Thunderbolts from 3 to 15 September 1944
- 409th Bombardment Group flew A-20 Havocs from August to November 1944 and A-26 Invader s from mid November 1944 until early February 1945
- 435th Troop Carrier Group flew C-47 Skytrains frp, 13 February until 25 June 1945 The C-47s pulled gliders in the airborne assault across the Rhine (Operation Varsity).

The Americans returned control of the base to the French Air Force in August 1945 and it returned to being a French military airfield.

=== Post WW2 ===
After the war, the base was completely rebuilt, with a new 9000' (3000m) jet runway laid down parallel to the wartime 05/23 main. The wartime runway was reduced in width, resurfaced with asphalt and reused as a taxiway. The secondary 11/29 was also refurbished, however it was closed for the past few years. Aerial photography of the base shows it recently marked with an excellent concrete surface. New hangars and support facilities were built along with a new support area.

The base was a modern, fully equipped NATO base.

=== Current ===
The base was decommissioned from military usage in 2012

== Facilities ==
The Bureau enquêtes accidents défense (BEA Défense or BEAD), later the Bureau enquêtes accidents défense air (BEAD-air), and now the Bureau enquêtes accidents pour la sécurité de l'aéronautique d'État (BEA-É), was created on this air base.

== See also ==
- Advanced Landing Ground
