= Quartier Mangin =

Laon-Couvron Air Base Advanced Landing Ground (ALG) A-70 Quartier Mangin sur l'ancienne base de Couvron
- Part of United States Air Forces in Europe (USAFE); Armée de Terre
- Located near: Laon, Aisne, France
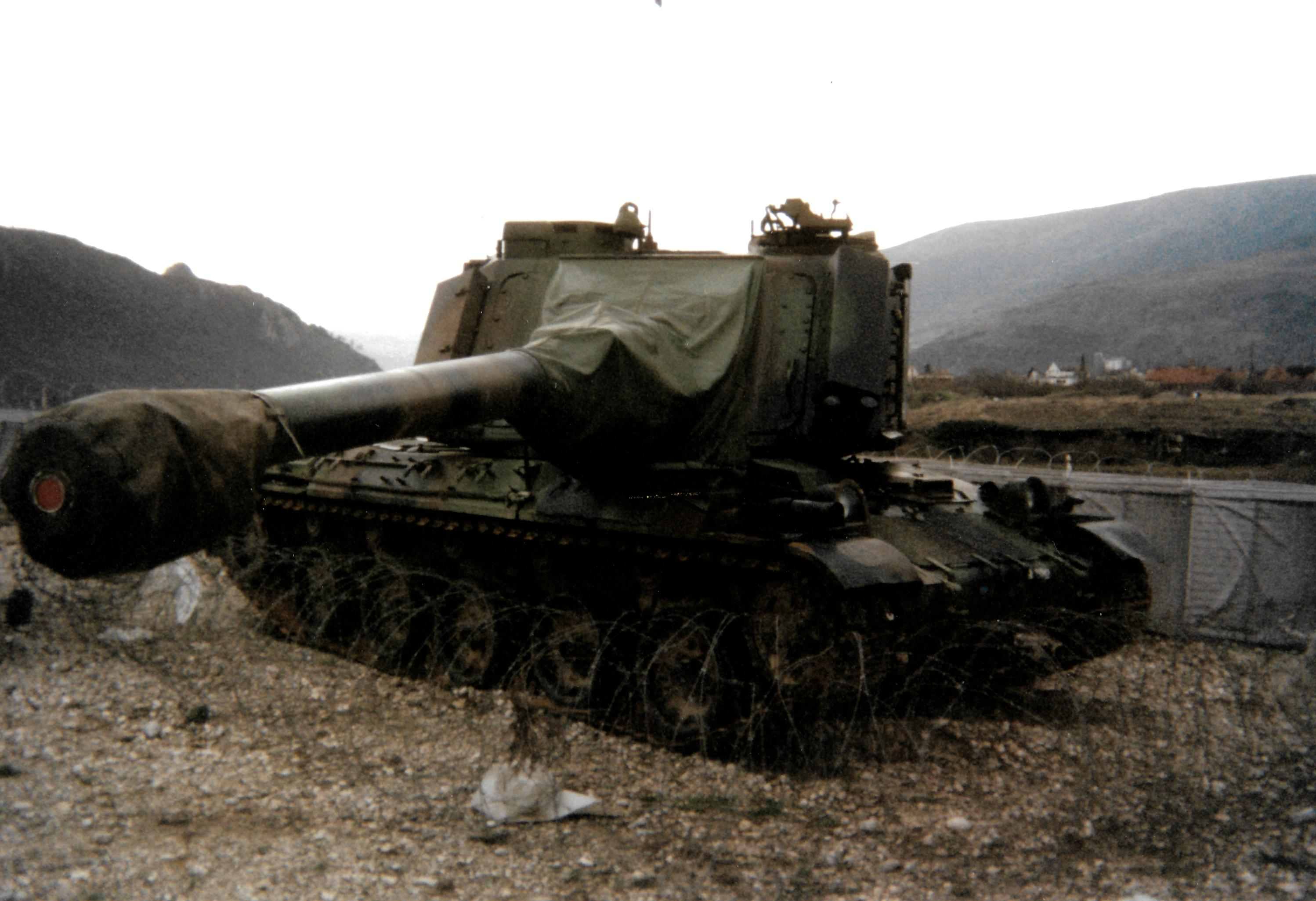
- The AUF1 Argenta, with a 155mm main gun like those equipping the 1er RAMa

Site information
- Controlled by: French Army

Location
- Coordinates: 49°38′0″N 3°32′54″E

Site history
- Built: 1930s
- In use: 1930s-Present

Garrison information
- Garrison: Artillery regiment left 2012.

Airfield information
- IATA: none; ICAO: LFQC

Summary
- Elevation AMSL: 263 ft (80 m)
- Coordinates: 49°38′00″N 003°32′54″E

Map
- Location of Laon-Couvron Air Base

Runways
Direction	Length		Surface
Direction	ft	m	Surface
3/21	7,900	2,407	Concrete

Laon-Couvron Air Base is a former French and United States Air Force base in France. It is located in the Aisne département of France, less than one mile southeast of the village of Couvron and 6 miles northwest of Laon; on the southwest side of the Autoroute des Anglais (A26 autoroute) 1 Mile (1.6 km) east of the village of Couvron-et-Aumencourt.

After 1967, the facility was a French Army Armée de Terre station, renaming the base Quartier Mangin sur l'ancienne base de Couvron. From 1980 to 2012 it was the home of the 1st Marine Artillery Regiment (1^{er} Régiment d'Artillerie de Marine (1er RAMa)).

== History ==
The location was used for the first time for aviation purposes at the end of the First World War, when the Germans built an airstrip for defending the Paris Gun.

The facility was re-established in 1938 as a French Air Force grass airdrome named "Laon-Chambry". It was headquarters of Groupement de Chasse 23 (Hunting Group 23) with G.C. II/2 being the operational squadron. There were about 26 Morane-Saulnier M.S.406 fighters assigned, along with 2 Curtiss Hawk 75s in May 1940, just prior to the Battle of France.

=== German use during Second World War ===
The airfield was seized by the Germans in late May during the Battle of France. The Luftwaffe quickly moved in combat strike units to continue the Blitzkrieg against French and British Expeditionary Force units in the battle. Known units assigned were:

- Jagdgeschwader 53 (JG 53) 26 May-1 June 1940 Messerschmitt Bf 109E
- Jagdgeschwader 2 (JG 2) 26 May-1 June 1940; 2–16 June 1940 Messerschmitt Bf 109E
- Sturzkampfgeschwader 2 (StG 2) 12 June–July 1940, Junkers Ju 87B Stuka

The Battle of France saw these JG 53 score heavily during May and June 1940 against Armee de l'Air and Royal Air Force forces, while JG 2 was tasked with escorting raids and defending German airspace to the south of Heinz Guderian's Panzer forces which were encircling the French and the British Expeditionary Force. StG 2 provided air-ground support of Wehrmacht units moving rapidly south into France and along the channel coast against mostly French Army units.

In the immediate aftermath of the German victory in France, the Luftwaffe moved in Kampfgeschwader 77 (KG 77), a bomber wing. KG 77 was initially equipped with Dornier Do 17Z, and later with Junkers Ju 88As in mid July 1940. carrying out attacks on England during the Battle of Britain. Initially having 35 Ju 88s, This unit suffered losses of 9 Ju 88s on a single mission against Gravesend on 18 September, one of the highest losses of any units in a single mission. On 27 September I./KG 77 lost six J 88s when raiding London, while II./KG 77 lost another six on the same night. In February 1941, the unit moved to Reims.

When the bombers moved out, the Luftwaffe improved the airfield, putting down two 1600m concrete runways (02/20, 10/28), along with concrete taxiways, dispersal hardstands and improved the support station and barracks.

The improved airfield came back onto operational status in October 1942 when a Luftwaffe pathfinder group, Kampfgeschwader 100 (KG 100) moved in on 7 October. Flying Heinkel He 111H, the group led night bombing attacks over England for other Luftwaffe units. It remained until December 1942 when it moved to Glifada, Greece (Athens).

Laon's next use by the Luftwaffe was by Kampfgeschwader 101 (KG 101) in March 1944, followed by Kampfgeschwader 30 (KG 30) in July 1944. KG 101 was part of the Mistel (German: Mistletoe), project, in which Junkers Ju 88A, bombers were controlled by a Messerschmitt Bf 109E, which was flown to the target by the fighter, then separated and guided, with a shaped 1,800 kg charge at the nose of the aircraft, and used as unmanned powered bomb. KG 101 flew several attacks against hardened Allied targets along the English Channel coast, and later KG 30 flew conventional bombing attacks against Allied harbors in newly liberated areas of the French channel coast. These activities drew Allied attention to the base, with it being attacked by B-17 Flying Fortress heavy bombers of the Eighth Air Force 100th Bombardment Group on 5 May 1944

With the bombers moving out, the Luftwaffe turned Laon-Couvron into a fighter-interceptor base, with Jagdgeschwader 27 (JG 27) flying Bf 109G day interceptors against Eighth Air Force bomber groups over Occupied Europe. Largely due to its use as a base for interceptors, Laon-Couvron was attacked by USAAF Ninth Air Force Martin B-26 Marauder medium bombers and Republic P-47 Thunderbolts mostly with 500-pound General-Purpose bombs; unguided rockets and .50 caliber machine gun sweeps when Eighth Air Force heavy bombers (Boeing B-17 Flying Fortresses, Consolidated B-24 Liberators) were within interception range of the Luftwaffe aircraft assigned to the base. The attacks were timed to have the maximum effect possible to keep the interceptors pinned down on the ground and be unable to attack the heavy bombers. Also the North American P-51 Mustang fighter-escort groups of Eighth Air Force would drop down on their return to England and attack the base with a fighter sweep and attack any target of opportunity to be found at the airfield.

=== American wartime use ===
In August 1944, the Laon area was liberated by the Third Army and Laon-Couvron was captured about 7 September. The airfield was repaired by the IX Engineering Command, 820th Engineer Aviation Battalion, and declared operationally ready for combat on 10 September. Under American control it was designated as Advanced Landing Ground "A-70 Laon-Couvron".

Ninth Air Force assigned the 50th Fighter Group, based P-47 Thunderbolt] fighters to the airfield on 15 September, remaining until 28 September. The fighter planes flew support missions during the Allied invasion of France, patrolling roads, strafing German military vehicles, and dropping bombs on gun emplacements, anti-aircraft artillery and concentrations of German troops when spotted. Afterwards, the A-26 Invader-equipped 409th Bombardment Group, arrived in February 1945, remaining until June when the base was closed.

After the end of the Second World War, Laon Air Base was returned to the French on 23 October 1945 and the facility was unused for several years, the land being leased by the French Air Ministry to farmers for agricultural use.

== U.S. acquisition and use ==
With the outbreak of the Cold War in the late 1940s and the Berlin Airlift and the ongoing threat from the Soviet Union to Western Europe, the Soviet threat appeared to be growing. Thus negotiations began in November 1950 between NATO and the United States to station combat forces in France to meet European defense needs. During the site selection negotiations, Laon-Couvron was initially proposed by the USAF to become a Light Bomber air base, and also an Air Division Headquarters base. Also, the USAF had historically used the base, and it was presently unused. An agreement was reached with the French Air Ministry in early 1951 for the Americans to return to Laon-Couvron and redevelop the base, and that a USAF light bomber wing would be stationed there as soon as possible.

On 15 June 1951 construction began to upgrade the wartime facilities to NATO standards. When USAF engineers arrived they found the base much as the USAAF had left it in 1945, with wrecked hangars and support facilities full of garbage and vermin after years of abandonment, still in ruins from the numerous bombing raids; two patched runways, and various amounts of aircraft wreckage moved off the grass areas which were leased to farmers in the postwar years. The entire base had to be bulldozed and cleared before construction could begin. New water wells were dug and new water lines and sewage pipes were laid. A new water treatment plant, along with upgraded roads were built. A new jet runway was constructed over the existing wartime secondary runway, the primary being resurfaced and used as a taxiway to a new maintenance support site.

The design of the airfield was to space park aircraft as far apart as possible by the construction of a circular marguerite system of hardstands that could be revetted later with earth for added protection. Typically the marguerite consisted of fifteen to eighteen hardstands around a large central hangar. Each hardstand held one or two aircraft, and allowed the planes to be spaced approximately 150 feet (50 m) apart. Each squadron was assigned to a separate hangar/hardstand complex. This construction can be seen clearly in the satellite image link at the bottom of this article. By 1954 the base was ready for use by operational Air Force Wings.

=== 126th Bombardment Wing (Light) ===
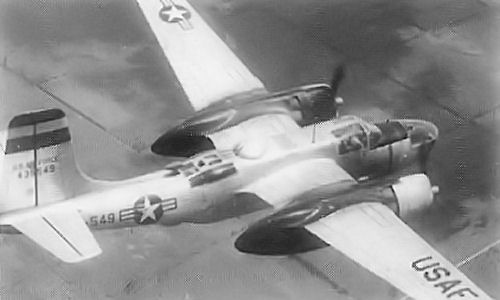
Douglas A/B-26C-35-DT Invader Serial 44-35549 of the 180th LBS

The first USAF unit to use Laon AB was the activated Air National Guard 126th Bombardment Wing, flying the Second World War vintage Douglas B-26B/C "Invader" light bomber.

The wing consisted of the 108th, 168th and 180th Bomb Squadrons (Light). The aircraft were marked by various color bands on the vertical stabilizer and rudder. Black/Yellow/Blue for the 108th; Black/Yellow/Red for the 168th, and Black/Yellow/Green for the 180th.

The 126th BW was called to active service on 1 April 1951 and was initially deployed to Bordeaux AB in November 1951. On 25 May 1952 the wing was relocated to Laon, with Bordeaux becoming a support base. A total of 5 B-26Bs, 6 TB-26Bs, and 26 B-26Cs were transferred from Bordeaux, and an additional 48 B-26C's painted black and equipped for night missions were deployed from CONUS to Laon.

At Laon, the 126th used its B-26's for training and maneuvers at Laon until December until being relieved from active duty and transferred, without personnel and equipment, back to the control of the Illinois Air National Guard on 1 January 1953.

=== 38th Tactical Bombardment Wing ===
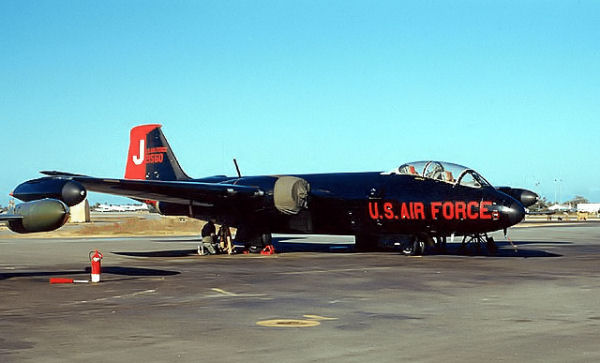
Martin B-57B-MA Serial 52-1560 of the 71st Light Bomber Squadron – 1957. This aircraft was also one of the "Black Knights" aerial acrobatic team. After its withdrawal from France in 1958, this aircraft was eventually assigned to the 8th Tactical Bomb Squadron at Phan Rang Air Base South Vietnam and flew combat bombing missions into the late 1960s.

On 1 January 1953, the flying assets of the 126th Bomb Wing were transferred to the 38th Tactical Bombardment Wing. The 38th's squadrons were designated the 71st, 405th, and 822nd Bomb Squadrons. The wing continued flying the B-26's until 1956.

In April 1955 the 38th Bomb Wing converted to the Martin B-57 "Canberra". The B-57 was a replacement for aging Douglas B-26 "Invader", and with their arrival, the B-26's were returned to CONUS. Because English Electric was unable to meet the USAF delivery schedule, the design was licensed to Martin for US manufacture. A total of 49 B-57B and 8 2-seat B-57C models were deployed to Laon.

The mission of the B-57 was to provide a nuclear deterrent for NATO and to deliver nuclear weapons against pre-selected targets, day or night. The aircraft at Laon were painted a gloss black. An acrobatic team was organized and named the Black Knights using five B-57's. The Black Knights performed at several air shows around Western Europe, including the 1957 Paris Air Show. The Black Knights were the only tactical bomber show team in the world.

In 1958, General De Gaulle announced that all nuclear weapons and delivery aircraft had to be removed from French soil by July 1958. Since NATO strategy had evolved into "massive nuclear retaliation" this meant all tactical fighter and bombing wings had to depart France. The 38th TBW was inactivated at Laon on 18 June 1958 and redesignated as the 38th Tactical Missile Wing at Hahn Air Base West Germany, operating and maintaining the TM-61 "Matador" cruise missile.

The support personnel of the 38th were reassigned to the incoming 66th Tactical Reconnaissance Wing.

The B-57's were returned to CONUS and transferred to the Air National Guard and some were converted into various other versions (reconnaissance, electronic warfare) of the B-57. Aircraft from Laon were assigned to the following units:

- 117th Tactical Reconnaissance Squadron, Kansas ANG, Hutchinson, KS
- 154th Tactical Reconnaissance Squadron, Arkansas ANG, Little Rock, AR
- 165th Tactical Reconnaissance Squadron, Kentucky ANG, Louisville, KY
- 172nd Tactical Reconnaissance Squadron, Michigan ANG, Battle Creek, MI

Many of these aircraft were deployed to Southeast Asia during the Vietnam War. By 1973, most of the surviving B-57s had been consigned to the boneyards at Davis Monthan AFB.

=== 66th Tactical Reconnaissance Wing ===
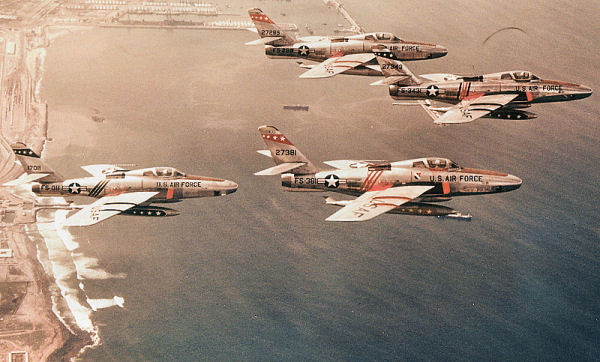
Republic RF-84F-25-RE Thunderflashes of the 66th Tactical Reconnaissance Wing flying over the coast of Morocco near Nouasseur Air Base - 1958. Identified serials are 51-17011, 52-7318, 52-7343 and 52-7295. All of these aircraft were sold to the German Air Force. 17011 was later sold to the Greek Air Force and 7381 to the Italian Air Force. 17011 is now on permanent display at the Hellenic AF Museum, Dekelia AB, Athens.

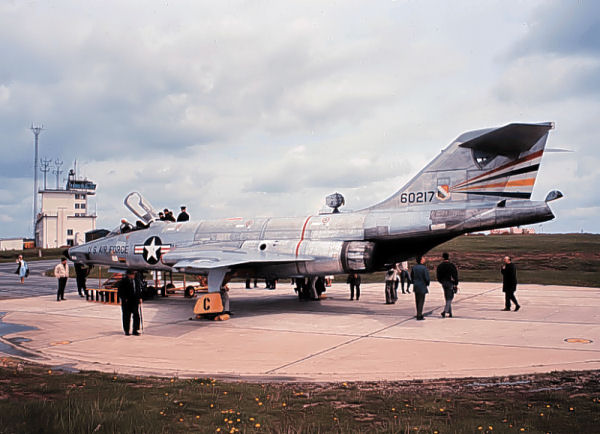
McDonnell RF-101C-55-MC Voodoo 56-0217 of the 66th Tactical Reconnaissance Wing, Laon Air Base France, 1959. The combination green, yellow, blue and red stripes on the tail signify the wing commander's aircraft.

With the forced withdrawal of the nuclear-equipped B-57s from France, USAFE decided to move the 66th Tactical Reconnaissance Wing to Laon. In 1955 the 66th TRW was assigned to Sembach AB in West Germany, however the flying facilities were inadequate and the base was too small to support flying operations. This move was also in accordance with USAFEs plan to realign the posture of various bases in anticipation of aircraft conversion. The 66th was to convert to the RF-101 Voodoo.

On 10 July 1958, 66th TRW Wing Headquarters was transferred to Laon, however its flying squadrons, the 32nd, 38th, 302nd and 303rd, were located at Phalsbourg AB until considerable runway improvements, in particular the preparation of runway overruns could be made at Laon.

In September, the 64 RF-84F "Thunderstreak" tactical reconnaissance aircraft of the 66th arrived at Laon. Just prior to the move, in a public relations exercise, the 302nd engaged in some large-scale oblique photo coverage of all towns and cities within a 30-mile radius of Laon. The processed photos were presented to the various town and city officials as a means of introducing the newcomers to the community.

In early 1959 it was announced that the 302nd and 303rd TRS were to be inactivated and their places in the 66th taken by the 17th and 18th TRS from Shaw AFB, South Carolina. These two units arrived at Laon in May 1959, with the 302nd and 303rd inactivated on 20 June. All the RF-84s were ferried to the IRAN facility at Naples for eventual distribution to NATO forces.

In January 1959 the announcement was made that the 32nd and 38th Tactical Reconnaissance Squadrons were to receive the McDonnell RF-101C "Voodoo". Many of the pilots of the 302nd and 303rd squadrons were transferred to the new Voodoo squadrons.

Capt. Neely was the chief test pilot from 1959 to 1962. Capt. Everhart commissioned officer in charge, with Chief Master Sergeant Carl L. Molis as NCO were in charge of field maintenance operations from December 1959 to October 1962.

=== USAF Closure ===
On 7 March 1966, Gen Charles De Gaulle announced that France would withdraw from NATO's military structure but not leave the political organization. He gave NATO forces one year (until 1 April 1967) to depart France.

On 10 June 1966 the 7379th Tactical Group was activated at Laon AB to facilitate the closure of the base. There was no space available in Germany to relocate the 66th TRW, so the Strategic Air Command's standby base at RAF Upper Heyford, England, was transferred to USAFE and the wing relocated to the UK after eight years at Laon AB.

The relocation of the 66th TRW was completed by November 1966. Under the US Embassy in Paris, a caretaker force, 7260th Support Group, DET 18 MLS, provided security, with 6 French nationals for records and utility system operations remained until 30 March 1967 when the remaining USAF equipment and personnel were transferred out of Laon and the base was returned to the French.

== Current uses ==
With the withdrawal of the USAF, the French Army moved into Laon Air Base and renamed the facility Quartier Mangin sur l'ancienne base de Couvron. From 1980 it was the home of the 1st Marine Artillery Regiment (1^{er} Regiment d'Artillerie de Marine (1er RAMa)).

Many of the old USAF buildings remain at the technical area and support base, and were used by the French. The three large hangars on the main parking ramp have been removed, with new-purpose-built structures being erected on the parking ramp area. The hangars in the two northern squadron marguerites have been removed, but both parking areas are still relatively intact, albeit with deteriorating hardstands; the marguerite to the east having had much additional construction of army facilities over the years. The main NATO jet runway is no longer in use, however it appears well maintained along with the main taxiway. A small section of the runway has been used for helicopter operations.

Much of the wartime base remains, the entire length of the German 10/28 runway is visible, being used as an east–west access road and storage area for excess vehicles. The north–south 02/20 runway remains in part, with some buildings erected on parts of it, other parts reduced to a double road width, and other parts of broken-up, deteriorating concrete, with a parallel taxiway also still existing in part, being used as a perimeter road of the facility. A large area in the southwest of the base consists of abandoned streets, with concrete foundations of former buildings still remaining in the grass areas between them. It is not known if the foundations are from wartime or NATO buildings.

In addition, to the southeast just outside the current facility, are the remains of what was probably a German aircraft dispersal area with large, unconnected concrete areas in agricultural fields connected by single-lane concrete farm roads.

On 19 June 2012, the 1st Marine Artillery Régiment took up new quarters at Châlons-en-Champagne where it relieved the disbanded 402nd Artillery Regiment.

British company MotorSport Vision will build a racing circuit at Laon.
