= West Woodward Airport =

Airport in Oklahoma, United States of America

West Woodward Airport Woodward Army Airfield
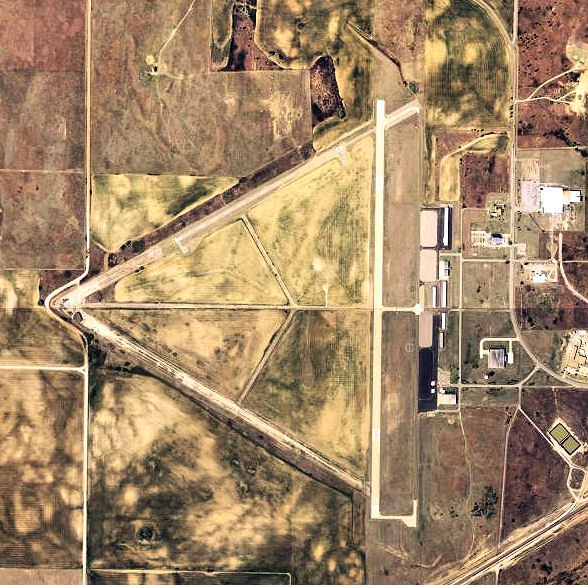
- 2006 USGS orthophoto
- IATA: WWR; ICAO: KWWR; FAA LID: WWR

Summary
- Airport type: Public
- Owner: City of Woodward
- Serves: Woodward, Oklahoma
- Elevation AMSL: 2,189 ft / 667 m
- Coordinates: 36°26′17″N 099°31′22″W

Map

Runways
Direction	Length		Surface
Direction	ft	m	Surface
17/35	5,502	1,677	Concrete
5/23	2,500	762	Asphalt

Statistics (2023)
- Aircraft operations (year ending 7/11/2023): 6,030
- Based aircraft: 25
- Source: Federal Aviation Administration

West Woodward Airport (IATA: WWR, ICAO: KWWR, FAA LID: WWR) is in Woodward County, Oklahoma, United States, seven miles west of Woodward, which owns it. The National Plan of Integrated Airport Systems for 2011–2015 called it a general aviation airport.

== History ==
Second Air Force until 1944. Sub-field of Will Rogers Field.

354th Army Air Forces Base Unit

Central Airlines scheduled flights to Woodward from 1950 to 1957.

== Facilities ==
The airport covers 1,310 acres (530 ha) at an elevation of 2,189 feet (667 m). It has two runways: 17/35 is 5,502 by 100 feet (1,677 x 30 m) concrete, and 5/23 is 2,500 by 60 feet (762 x 18 m) asphalt.

In the year ending July 11, 2023 the airport had 6,030 aircraft operations, 99% general aviation, and <1% military, average 116 per week. 25 aircraft were then based at the airport: 21 single-engine, 2 multi-engine, and 2 jet.

== See also ==
- List of airports in Oklahoma
