= Beauregard Regional Airport =

Beauregard Regional Airport DeRidder Army Air Base
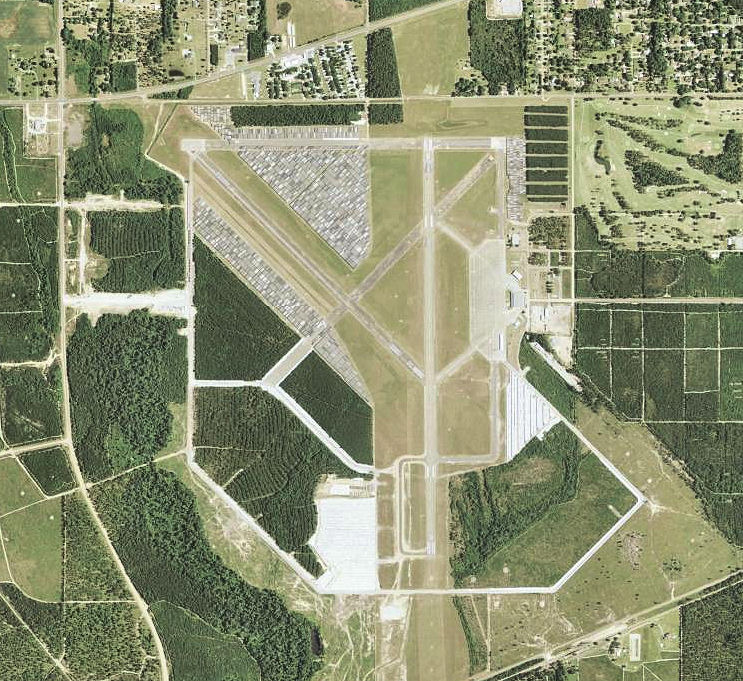
- USGS aerial image as of 2006
- IATA: DRI; ICAO: KDRI; FAA LID: DRI

Summary
- Airport type: Public
- Owner: Beauregard Parish
- Serves: DeRidder, Louisiana
- Location: Beauregard Parish, near DeRidder, Louisiana
- Elevation AMSL: 202 ft (62 m)
- Coordinates: 30°49′54″N 93°20′24″W

Map
- Location of Beauregard Regional Airport KDRI (the United States)

Runways
Direction	Length		Surface
Direction	ft	m	Surface
14/32	4,218	1,286	Asphalt
18/36	5,494	1,675	Asphalt/concrete

Statistics (2022)
- Aircraft operations (year ending 9/23/2022): 14,400
- Based aircraft: 20
- Source: Federal Aviation Administration

Beauregard Regional Airport (IATA: DRI, ICAO: KDRI, FAA LID: DRI) is a public use airport in Beauregard Parish, Louisiana, United States. It is owned by Beauregard Parish and is located three nautical miles (6 km) southwest of the central business district of DeRidder, Louisiana. The airport serves the general aviation community, with no scheduled commercial airline service.

== History ==
=== Origins ===
The present Beauregard Regional Airport has a long and colorful history, which began prior to its use as an airfield. The airport property includes most of what was once the Graybow community. In 1912 Graybow was an active community and the location of the Galloway Sawmill as well as the site of the Grabow riot.

The sawmill had been built along the Santa Fe Railroad tracks with the planer mill on one side of the tracks and the big mill, commissary, and office on the other side of the tracks.

Two decades later the nation was experiencing the effects of the Great Depression. To counteract the unemployment caused by the depression, work projects were activated across the country. One such project was begun in 1934, 3 miles (4.8 km) west of DeRidder under the Auspices of the Emergency Relief Authority which later became the WPA. This project in a stump littered field provided employment for about 400 men, who worked to clear what had once been a densely wooded region. They constructed two earthen runways on 160 acres (0.65 km^{2}) of land leased from the owner. The field was used very little. Barnstorming pilots would occasionally visit and offer rides for $2.00.

=== World War II ===
Interest in the military utilization of the airfield increased significantly in 1939 when war began in Europe. The United States needed a training ground for American troops. In the summer of 1940 and throughout 1941 the area was used for the "Louisiana Maneuvers".

The Beauregard Parish Police Jury bought the previously leased 160 acres (0.65 km^{2}) plus an additional 280 acres (1.1 km^{2}) for $11,000. An additional 200 acres (0.81 km^{2}) was later bought to make up 1-square-mile (2.6 km^{2}). In February, 1941, the United States Army Corps of Engineers visited the site urging that a proposed development be filed as a National Defense Project. The Police Jury and the City of DeRidder agreed to furnish the additional 200 acres (0.81 km^{2}), plus sewage and water facilities, and to remove obstructions to air navigation. The cost to be $475,518.85 excluding labor. On 1 July 1941, a contract for Lease was signed between the Beauregard Parish Police Jury and the United States Army Air Force for a military airfield to be built on the site.

An immediate construction program began to convert the civilian airport into a military airfield and support complex. Construction involved runways and airplane hangars, with three concrete runways, several taxiways and a large parking apron and a control tower. Several large hangars were also constructed. Buildings were ultimately utilitarian and quickly assembled. Most base buildings, not meant for long-term use, were constructed of temporary or semi-permanent materials. Although some hangars had steel frames and the occasional brick or tile brick building could be seen, most support buildings sat on concrete foundations but were of frame construction clad in little more than plywood and tarpaper. During the war years, the base had what was needed for the welfare of the men: a post exchange, library, chapel, finance building, orderly rooms, headquarters sub-depot, officers and enlisted men's clubs, hospital, theater, swimming pool, shooting range, bowling and billiards.

Just before Christmas 1941, the first troops arrived at the DeRidder Army Air Base. It housed anywhere from 3000 to 5000 troops at a time. The airfield was assigned to Third Air Force as a training airfield.

Initial training was performed by the III Reconnaissance Command, for reconnaissance and observation units. Units assigned to the airfield were:

- 74th Reconnaissance Group, 10 April – 13 December 1942
- 77th Reconnaissance Group, 25 July – 28 September 1942

In late 1942, the airfield was reassigned to III Tactical Air Command which performed medium and light bomber tactical bomber training. Units assigned to DeRidder and the aircraft they trained on were:

- 321st Bombardment Group (Medium), 1 December 1942 – 31 January 1943 B-25 Mitchell
- 312th Bombardment Group (Dive), 20 February – 13 April 1943 A-24 Banshee
- 417th Bombardment Group, 4 August – 10 December 1943 A-20 Havoc
- 409th Bombardment Group, 10 December 1943 – 10 February 1944 A-20 Havoc
- 408th Fighter Group, 12 February – 26 March 1944 P-40 Warhawk

on 31 March 1944, the II Tactical Air Division of III Tactical Air Command was assigned to DeRidder and conducted replacement training. Training ceased in February 1945 and the airfield was placed in reserve status. DeRidder Army Air Base was declared surplus on October 2, 1946 and transferred to War Assets Administration on April 30, 1947.

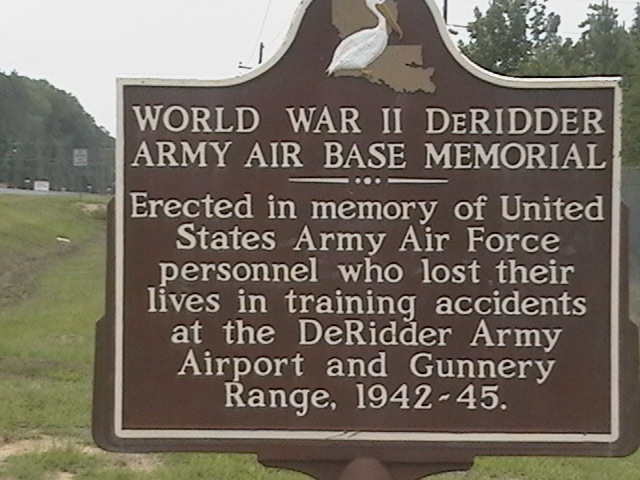

The Beauregard Parish Police Jury assumed responsibility for the airport that year. On December 23, 1948 the government deeded the base to the Police Jury under the terms of the Surplus Property Act.

=== Current use ===
A requirement of the deed was that the property had to remain a public airport and all benefits of the property must be used to benefit the airport. In this case the federal government not only gave the parish an airport but also gave a means by which the airport could provide for its own financial self-support. Today the airport includes over 4,200 acres (17 km^{2}) and is financially self-supporting.

The airport continues to host military exercises which include parachute jumps by Fort Johnson personnel. Today it operates as the largest general aviation facility that is located in the state of Louisiana. The hangar area is essentially unchanged today except that the 75-foot (23 m) control tower has long since been removed and replaced by a metal light beacon tower.

The World War II hangar remains in use as the main hangar and terminal of the Beauregard Regional Airport. The concrete vault of the Army Air Base Finance Office is located adjacent to the hangar. The streets as laid out during World War II are still in use and several foundations of original buildings are still intact.

== Facilities and aircraft ==
Beauregard Regional Airport covers an area of 4,300 acres (1,700 ha) at an elevation of 202 feet (62 m) above mean sea level. It has two runways: 14/32 is 4,218 by 60 feet (1,286 x 18 m) with an asphalt surface; 18/36 is 5,494 by 100 feet (1,675 x 30 m) with an asphalt/concrete surface.

For the 12-month period ending September 23, 2022, the airport had 14,400 aircraft operations, an average of 39 per day: 93% general aviation and 7% military. At that time there were 20 aircraft based at this airport: 18 single-engine and 2 multi-engine.

== See also ==
- List of airports in Louisiana
- Louisiana World War II Army Airfields
- DeRidder USO Building
