= 509th Tactical Fighter Squadron =

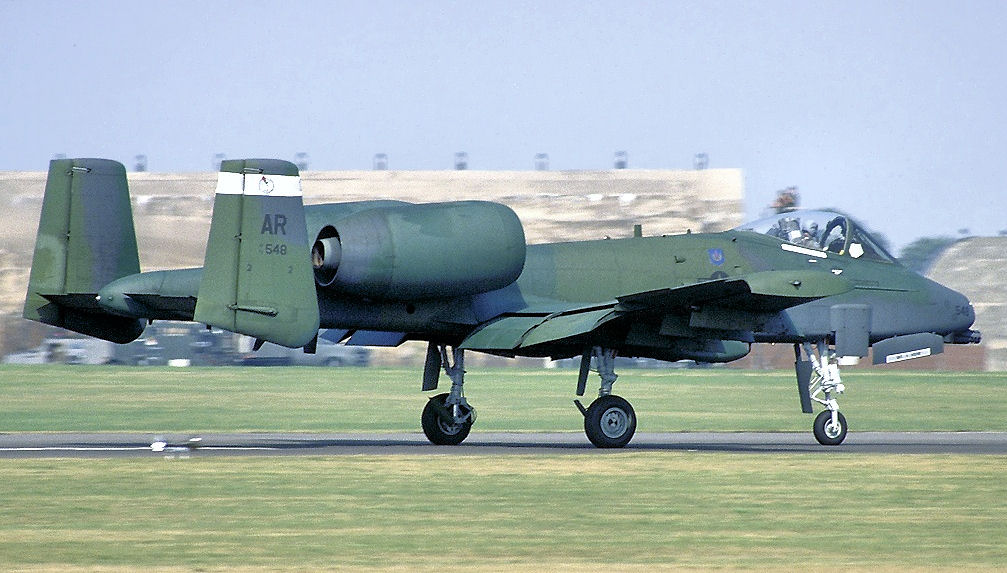
- Squadron A-10A Thunderbolt II (Note: Aircraft is Fairchild Republic A-10A Thunderbolt II, serial 76-0548, taken about 1990. This plane was sent to the Aerospace Maintenance and Regeneration Center on 6 April 1992. Baugher, Joe (6 November 2022). "1976 USAF Serial Numbers". Joe Baugher.)
- Active: 1943–1945; 1952–1958; 1959–1970; 1979–1992
- Country: United States
- Branch: United States Air Force
- Role: fighter bomber
- Engagements: European Theater of Operations; Vietnam War
- Decorations: Distinguished Unit Citation; Air Force Outstanding Unit Award with Combat "V" Device; Air Force Outstanding Unit Award; Cited in the Order of the Day by the Belgian Army; Vietnamese Gallantry Cross with Palm

Insignia
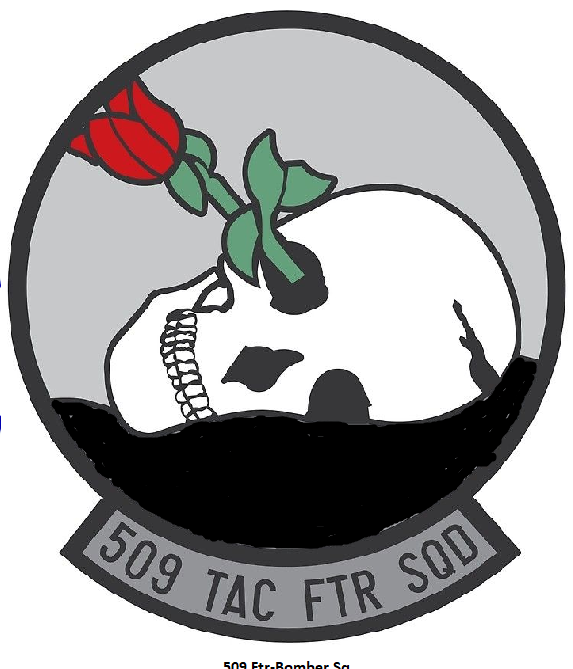
- 509th Tactical Fighter Squadron emblem (Note: Approved 30 January 1957. Description: On a light silver gray disc bordered black, in base a mound of earth, dark gray; imbedded in the earth and lying on its side a white skull, gaping eye sockets nose and mouth black; springing up through the upper eye socket and extending over the border in bend a red rose, stem and leaves green; all outlines and details black throughout.)

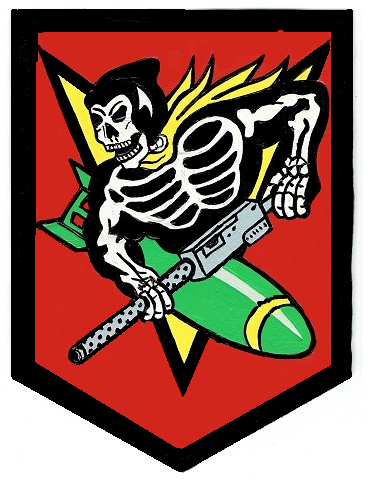
- 509th Fighter Squadron emblem (World War II)
- Vietnam War tail code: PK
- World War II fuselage code: G9

The 509th Tactical Fighter Squadron is an inactive United States Air Force unit. It was last assigned to the 10th Tactical Fighter Wing at RAF Alconbury, England, where it was inactivated on 30 December 1992.

The squadron was first activated as the 624th Bombardment Squadron in 1943, changing to the 509th Fighter-Bomber Squadron a few months later. After training in the United States, it moved to England in March 1944, helping prepare for Operation Overlord by attacking targets in France. Following D-Day, the squadron moved to the continent, providing close air support for Allied forces. The squadron earned a Distinguished Unit Citation and was cited in the Order of the Day by the Belgian Army. After V-E Day The squadron returned to the United States and was inactivated at the port of embarkation.

The squadron was activated again in 1952, when it replaced an Air National Guard squadron that had been mobilized for the Korean War. It trained for fighter bomber operations until inactivating in 1958. A year later, it was activated in the Philippines as the 509th Fighter-Interceptor Squadron with an air defense mission. It deployed interceptor aircraft to Taiwan and from 1962 to 1969 maintained detachments in Vietnam.

The squadron was inactivated in 1970, but returned in England in 1979.

== History ==
=== World War II ===
The squadron was originally activated at Drew Field, Florida on 1 March 1943 as the 624th Bombardment Squadron, one of the four original squadrons of the 405th Bombardment Group. It was initially equipped with Douglas A-24 Banshees and Bell P-39 Airacobras. Although retaining the same mission and equipment, in August the squadron was renamed the 509th Fighter-Bomber Squadron. The following month, it moved to Walterboro Army Air Field, South Carolina, where it began to fly the Republic P-47 Thunderbolts, with which it would be equipped for the rest of World War II. On 14 February 1944, the 509th left its training base for the European Theater of Operations.

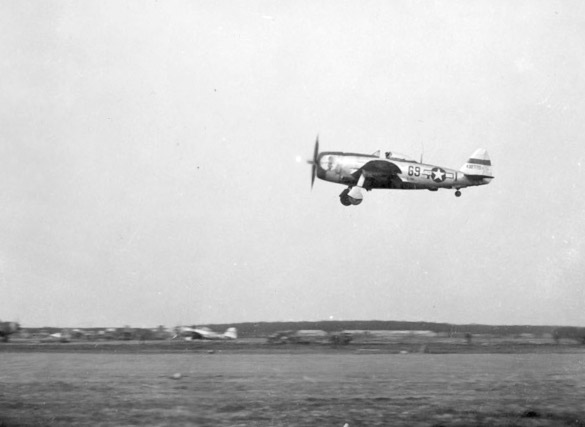
509th Fighter Squadron P-47D (Note: Aircraft is Republic P-47D-30-RA, fuselage code G9-I)

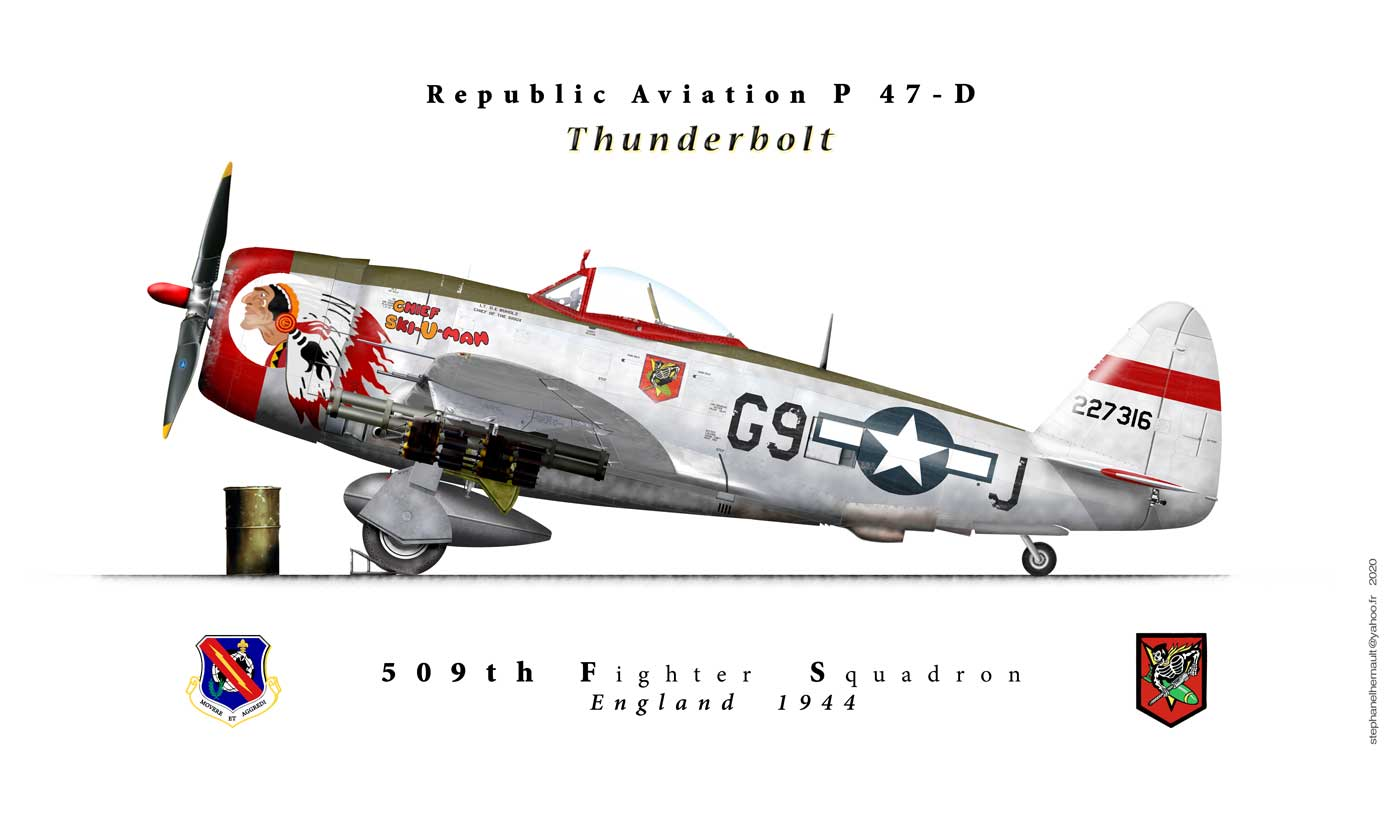
P47D 509th Fighter Squadron 1944 (Note: Aircraft is Republic P-47-27-RE Thunderbolt, serial 42-27316, Chief Ski-U-Mah, fuselage code G9-J. Baugher, Joe (5 April 2023). "1942 USAF Serial Numbers". Joe Baugher.)

The squadron arrived at its first station in the theater, RAF Christchurch, England in early March 1944 and flew its first combat mission the following month. It dropped the "bomber" portion of its designation in May, but retained the fighter bomber mission. The 509th helped prepare for Operation Overlord, the invasion of Normandy, by striking military airfields, and lines of communication, particularly bridges and railroad marshalling yards. On D-Day, it flew combat patrols in the vicinity of Brest, France, and in the following days flew armed reconnaissance missions over Normandy.

Toward the end of June, the squadron moved to Picauville Airfield, France, and for the rest of the war concentrated on providing close air support for ground forces. It supported Operation Cobra, the breakout at Saint Lo in July with attacks on military vehicles and artillery positions. The squadron engaged and destroyed a German armored column near Avranches, France, on 29 July 1944. After immobilizing leading and trailing elements of the 3-mile (4.8 km) long column, the rest of the tanks and trucks were systematically destroyed with multiple sorties. Its operations from D-Day through September 1944 supporting the liberation of Belgium earned the squadron a citation in the Order of the Day of the Belgian Army. The squadron received a Distinguished Unit Citation for action on 24 September 1944 when the 4th Armored Division experienced a counterattack by enemy forces and urgently needed air support. Elements of the 405th Group attacked the enemy armor despite an 800-foot ceiling that forced attacks to be made from low level in the face of intense flak. A second group element was unable to locate the tank battle because of the adverse weather, but located a reinforcing column of armor and trucks, causing major damage. A third element attacked warehouses and other buildings in the vicinity that were being used by the enemy. (Note: Both Maurer and Rust identify the 405th Group's three attacks as being made by one of the group's three squadrons. However, neither identifies which squadron was involved in which action. All three of the group's squadrons were awarded a DUC for the day's attacks. Maurer, Combat Units, pp.290–291; Rust, p. 122.)

The squadron flew its last combat mission of the war on 8 May 1945. It briefly served in the occupation forces at AAF Station Straubing, but by 8 July was mostly a paper unit. Its remaining personnel returned to the United States in October and the squadron was inactivated upon arrival at the port of embarkation.

=== Reactivation as a fighter bomber unit ===
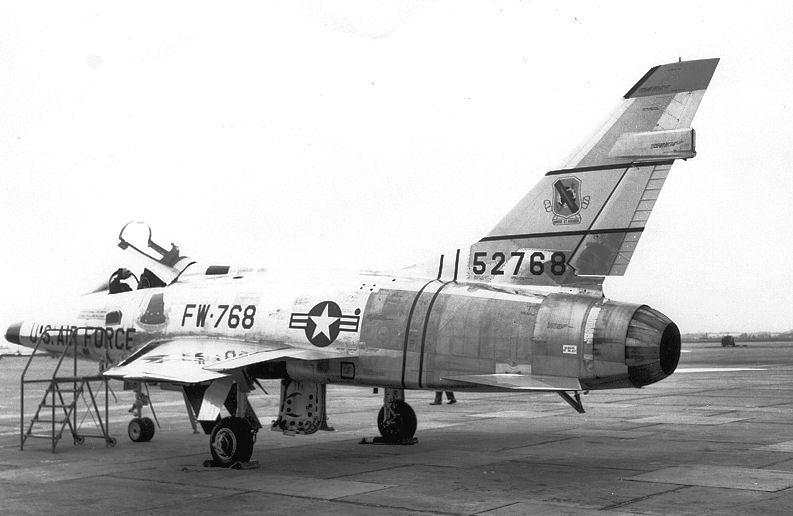
Squadron F-100D (Note: Aircraft is North American F-100D-40-NH Super Sabre, serial 55-2768. This plane was transferred to the Royal Danish Air Force on 3 June 1961. Baugher, Joe (21 April 2023). "1955 USAF Serial Numbers". Joe Baugher.)

The squadron returned to its designation as the 509th Fighter-Bomber Squadron and was activated at Godman Air Force Base, Kentucky on 1 December 1952, when it assumed the mission, personnel and F-47 Thunderbolt aircraft of the 141st Fighter-Bomber Squadron, a New Jersey Air National Guard unit that had been called to active duty for the Korean War. However, Godman was not suitable for jet fighter operations, and in April 1953, the squadron moved to Langley Air Force Base, Virginia as the Air Force prepared to transfer Godman to the Army. After arriving at Langley, the squadron was able to upgrade to Republic F-84 Thunderjets, later upgrading to North American F-100 Super Sabres. The squadron was inactivated with the rest of the 405th Wing in July 1958.

=== Air defense in the Pacific ===
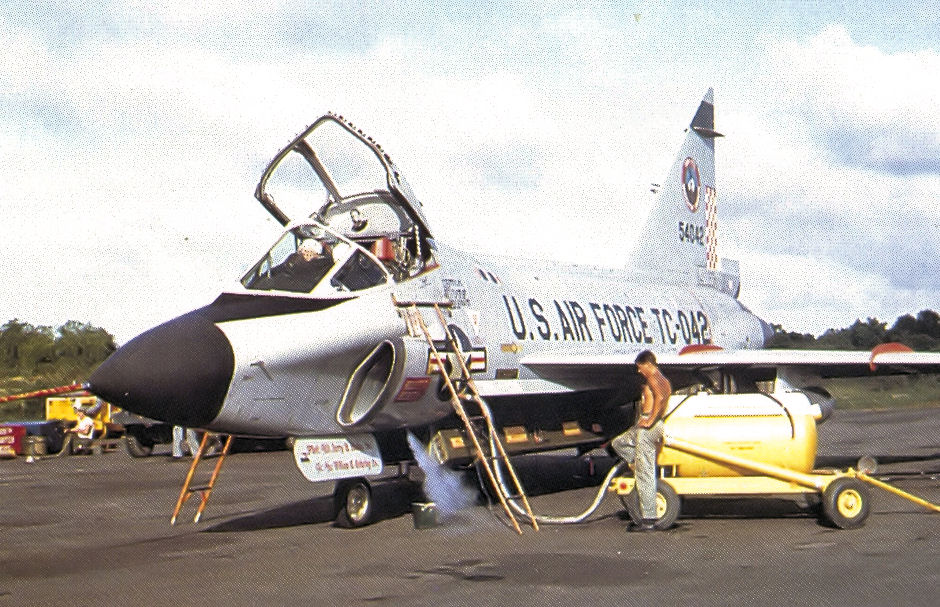
Squadron TF-102 at Clark Air Base, Philippines in 1962 (Note: Aircraft is Convair TF-102A-30-CO Delta Dagger, serial 55-4042. This aircraft was transferred to the Hawaii Air National Guard in 1971. Baugher, Joe (21 April 2023). "1955 USAF Serial Numbers". Joe Baugher.)

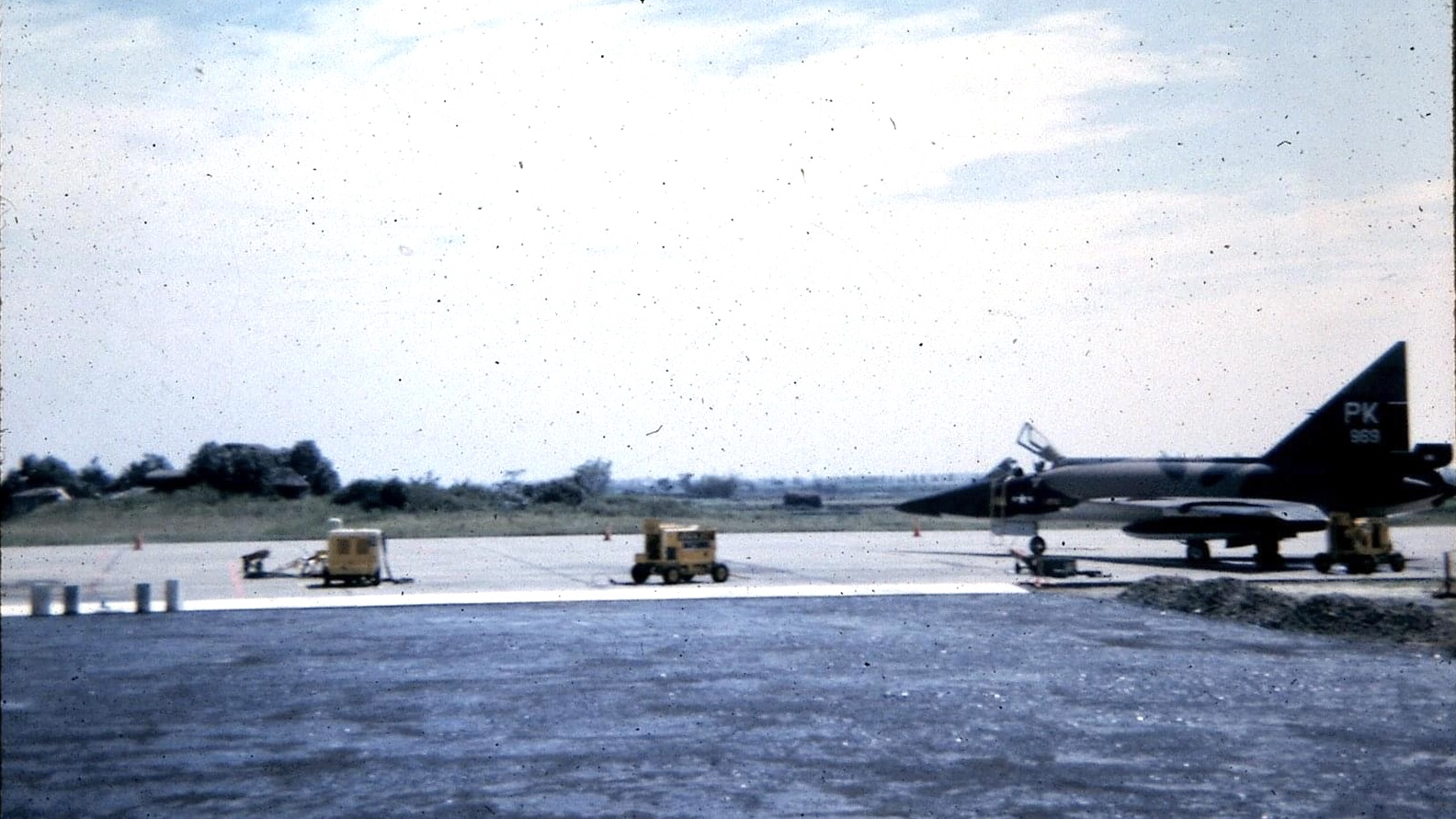
Squadron F-102A deployed to Tainan Air Base, Taiwan in 1969 (Note: Aircraft is Convair F-102A-51-CO Delta Dagger, serial 56-0968, tail code PK. This plane was salvaged in July 1970 at Itazuke, Japan. Baugher, Joe (14 February 2023). "1956 USAF Serial Numbers". Joe Baugher.)

The squadron was redesignated the 509th Fighter-Interceptor Squadron and activated in April 1959, when the 405th Fighter Wing replaced the 6200th Air Base Wing at Clark Air Base, Philippines. The squadron assumed the mission, personnel and North American F-86D Sabres of the 26th Fighter-Interceptor Squadron, which was simultaneously inactivated. The following year, the squadron replaced its Sabres with Convair F-102 Delta Daggers, which were armed with AIM-4 Falcons and equipped with data link for intercept control.

The squadron mission was air defense of the Philippines, but as the only USAF interceptor unit in the southern Pacific, the squadron was called on to deploy elements to other countries. One of the earliest deployments was to Don Muang Airport outside Bangkok, Thailand of six F-102s under Operation Bell Tone. It also deployed to Taiwan. In March 1962, the American radar unit at Pleiku Air Base began to detect unknown aircraft entering South Vietnamese airspace. In response, the squadron sent a detachment of four "Deuces" to Tan Son Nhut Airport, near Saigon. One was a two-seat TF-102, which proved better at intercepting the slow-moving aircraft used for training to simulate the intruders. As a result, more TF-102s were drawn from Fifth and Thirteenth Air Forces for the detachment. In July, the squadron's planes were replaced by Navy Douglas AD-5Q Q-Birds, and the Air Force and Navy began a series of six-week rotations for air defense in Vietnam.

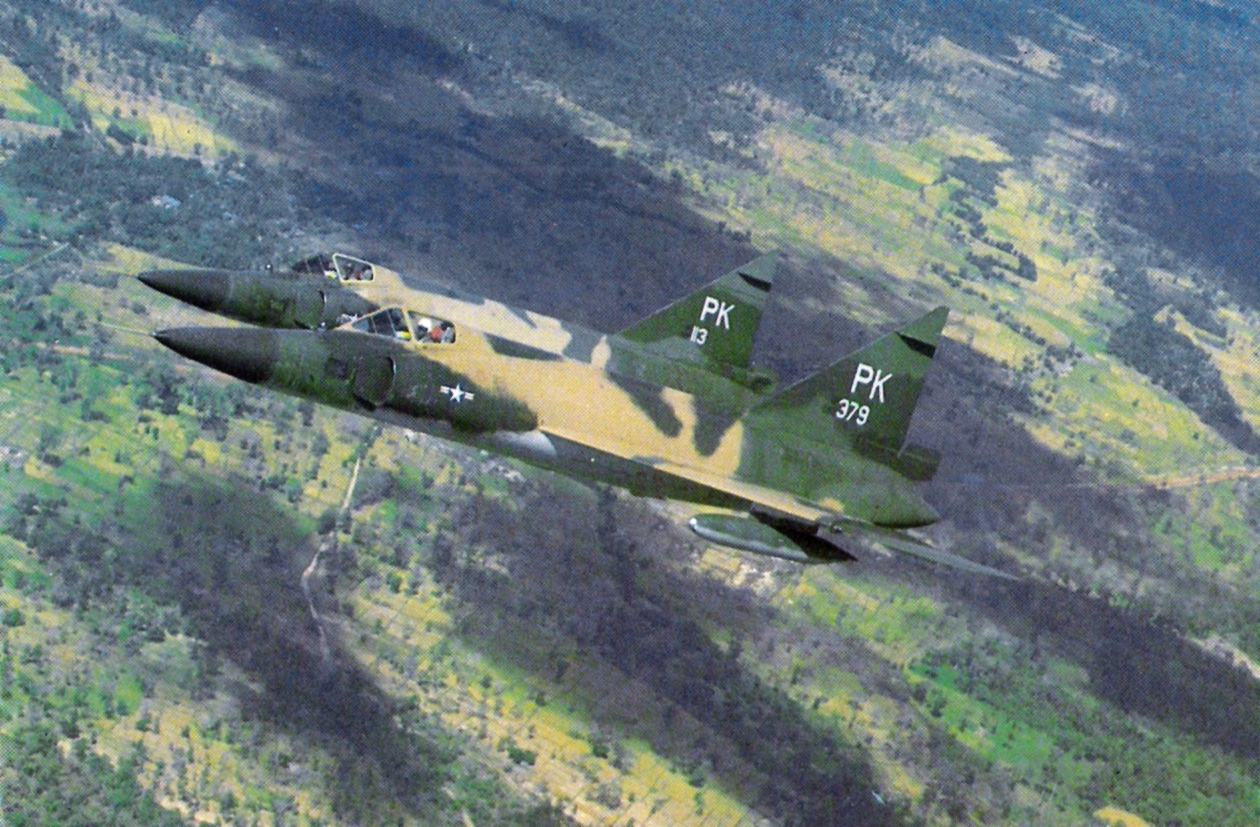
Squadron F-102As over Vietnam in November 1966. (Note: Second aircraft is Convair F-102A-60-CO Delta Dart, serial 56-1113 (salvaged at Itazuke, Japan in February 1970. Baugher, Joe (14 February 2023). "1956 USAF Serial Numbers". Joe Baugher.)

The Gulf of Tonkin Incident resulted in another deployment of squadron interceptors to Vietnam. On 5 August 1964, six F-102s deployed from Clark to Da Nang Air Base in the northern part of South Vietnam. By the end of 1966, the squadron was maintaining six planes on alert at Bien Hoa Air Base in addition to the six at Da Nang, with another ten located in Thailand at Don Muang and at Udorn Royal Thai Air Force Base. After June 1966, the detachments in Thailand were maintained jointly with the 64th Fighter-Interceptor Squadron, which had been activated as a second F-102 unit at Clark. Fourteen aircraft were kept on five-minute alert, while the rest were expected to respond within an hour. Missions included providing top cover for Boeing B-52 Stratofortresses engaged in Operation Arc Light missions. This alert commitment lasted until December 1969, and 15 F-102s were lost during Southeast Asia operations. The squadron's detachments in Thailand were closed under Projects Banner Star and Banner Sun and their planes returned to Clark. The squadron became nonoperational on 17 July 1970 and was inactivated a week later with the phaseout of the F-102 in the Pacific.

=== Tactical fighter operations in Europe ===
The squadron was again redesignated, this time as the 509th Tactical Fighter Squadron and activated at RAF Woodbridge, England in October 1979 as the 81st Tactical Fighter Wing changed its mission to close air support and air interdiction as it equipped with Fairchild Republic A-10 Thunderbolt IIs and expanded from three to six operational squadrons. Four months later, the squadron moved to the 81st Wing's main base at RAF Bentwaters. The squadron participated in joint and combined exercises with American and British ground forces and periodically deployed to designated wartime operating bases at RAF Ahlhorn and Norvenich Air Base in Germany.

In June 1988, the squadron moved to RAF Alconbury, where it was assigned to the 10th Tactical Fighter Wing. The squadron continued the same mission until inactivating in late December 1992 as the US reduced its presence in the United Kingdom.

== Lineage ==
- Constituted as the 624th Bombardment Squadron (Dive) on 4 February 1943

Activated on 1 March 1943
Redesignated 509th Fighter-Bomber Squadron on 10 August 1943
Redesignated 509th Fighter Squadron on 30 May 1944
Inactivated on 15 October 1945

- Redesignated 509th Fighter-Bomber Squadron on 15 October 1952

Activated on 1 December 1952
Inactivated on 1 July 1958

- Redesignated 509th Fighter-Interceptor Squadron on 11 March 1959

Activated on 9 April 1959
Inactivated on 24 July 1970

- Redesignated 509th Tactical Fighter Squadron on 30 April 1979
- Activated on 1 October 1979

Inactivated on 30 December 1992

=== Assignments ===
- 405th Bombardment Group (later 405th Fighter-Bomber Group, 405th Fighter Group), 1 March 1943 – 15 October 1945
- 405th Fighter-Bomber Group, 1 December 1952
- 405th Fighter-Bomber Wing, 8 October 1957 – 1 July 1958
- 405th Fighter Wing, 9 April 1959 – 24 July 1970 (attached to 23d Air Base Group 5 August 1964 – 8 July 1965, 6252d Tactical Fighter Wing 8 July–November 1965)
- 81st Tactical Fighter Wing, 1 October 1979
- 10th Tactical Fighter Wing, 1 September 1988 – 30 December 1992

=== Stations ===
- Drew Field, Florida, 1 March 1943
- Walterboro Army Air Field, South Carolina, 14 September 1943 – 14 February 1944
- RAF Christchurch (AAF-416), England, 7 March–22 June 1944
- Picauville Airfield (A-8), France, 29 June 1944
- St-Dizier Airfield (A-64), France, c. 13 September 1944
- Ophoven Airfield (Y-32), Belgium, 6 February 1945
- Kitzingen Airfield (R-6), Germany, 23 April 1945
- AAF Station Straubing (R-68), Germany, 8 May–2 July 1945
- Camp Shanks, New York, 14–15 October 1945
- Godman Air Force Base, Kentucky, 1 December 1952
- Langley Air Force Base, Virginia, 17 April 1953 – 1 July 1958
- Clark Air Base, Philippines, 9 April 1959 – 24 July 1970
  ; Deployed to Kung Kuan Air Base, Taiwan, 1 August – 30 September 1961
- RAF Woodbridge, England, 1 October 1979
- RAF Bentwaters, England, 1 February 1980
- RAF Alconbury, England, 1 June 1988 – 30 December 1992

=== Aircraft ===
- Douglas A-24 Banshee, 1943
- Bell P-39 Airacobra, 1943
- Republic P-47 Thunderbolt (later F-47), 1943–1945, 1952
- Republic F-84 Thunderjet, 1953–1956
- North American F-100 Super Sabre, 1956–1958
- North American F-86D Sabre, 1959–1960
- Convair F-102 Delta Dagger, 1960–1970
- Fairchild Republic A-10 Thunderbolt II, 1979–1992

=== Awards and campaigns ===
Award streamer	Award	Dates	Notes
	Distinguished Unit Citation	24 September 1944	509th Fighter Squadron
	Air Force Outstanding Unit Award with Combat "V" Device	1 January 1968-15 December 1969	509th Fighter-Interceptor Squadron
	Air Force Outstanding Unit Award	1 November 1960-30 June 1961	509th Fighter-Interceptor Squadron
	Air Force Outstanding Unit Award	5 August 1964-31 March 1965	509th Fighter-Interceptor Squadron
	Air Force Outstanding Unit Award	1 July 1979-30 June 1981	509th Tactical Fighter Squadron
	Air Force Outstanding Unit Award	1 July 1981-30 June 1983	509th Tactical Fighter Squadron
	Air Force Outstanding Unit Award	1 June 1989-31 May 1991	509th Tactical Fighter Squadron
	Air Force Outstanding Unit Award	1 June 1991-31 May 1992	509th Tactical Fighter Squadron
	Vietnamese Gallantry Cross with Palm	1 April 1966-24 July 1970	509th Tactical Fighter Squadron

Campaign Streamer	Campaign	Dates	Notes
	Air Offensive, Europe	7 March 1944 – 5 June 1944	509th Fighter-Bomber Squadron (later 509th Fighter Squadron)
	Air Combat, EAME Theater	7 March 1944 – 11 May 1945	509th Fighter-Bomber Squadron (later 509th Fighter Squadron)
	Normandy	6 June 1944 – 24 July 1944	509th Fighter Squadron
	Northern France	25 July 1944 – 14 September 1944	509th Fighter Squadron
	Rhineland	15 September 1944 – 21 March 1945	509th Fighter Squadron
	Ardennes-Alsace	16 December 1944 – 25 January 1945	509th Fighter Squadron
	Central Europe	22 March 1944 – 21 May 1945	509th Fighter Squadron (Note: Because the squadron remained at Clark, and only detachments were located in Vietnam, the squadron does not have credit for any campaigns in Vietnam.)

== See also ==
- List of United States Air Force fighter squadrons
- List of F-86 Sabre units
- List of F-100 units of the United States Air Force
