= 511th Tactical Fighter Squadron =

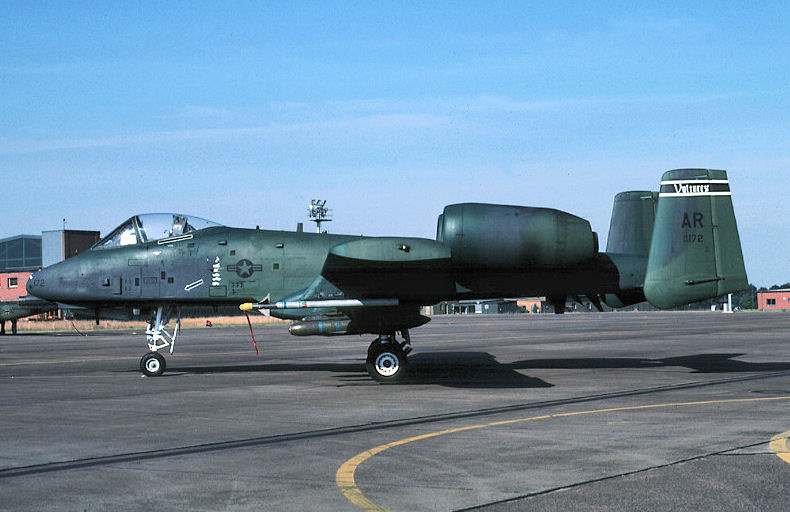
- 511th A-10 Thunderbolt II (Note: Aircraft is Fairchild Republic A-10 Thunderbolt II, serial 80-172, taken about 1990.)
- Active: 1943–1945; 1952–1958; 1959–1970; 1980–1992
- Country: United States
- Branch: United States Air Force
- Role: Tactical Fighter
- Engagements: European Theater of Operations; Desert Storm
- Decorations: Distinguished Unit Citation; Cited in the Order of the Day by the Belgian Army

Insignia
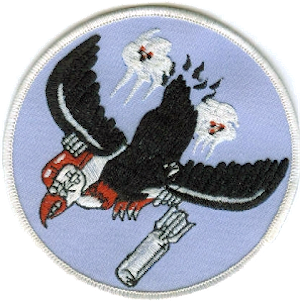
- 511th Fighter Squadron emblem (approved 12 February 1945)
- World War II fuselage code: K4

The 511th Tactical Fighter Squadron is an inactive United States Air Force unit. It was last assigned to the 10th Tactical Fighter Wing, stationed at RAF Alconbury, England. It was inactivated on 30 December 1992.

The squadron was first activated as the 626th Bombardment Squadron in 1943, changing to the 511th Fighter-Bomber Squadron a few months later. After training in the United States, it moved to England in March 1944, helping prepare for Operation Overlord by attacking targets in France. Following D-Day, the squadron moved to the continent, providing close air support for Allied forces. The squadron earned a Distinguished Unit Citation and was cited in the Order of the Day by the Belgian Army. After V-E Day The squadron returned to the United States and was inactivated at the port of embarkation.

The squadron was activated again in 1952, when it replaced an Air National Guard squadron that had been mobilized for the Korean War. It trained for fighter bomber operations until inactivating in 1958. In 1970, it was activated at Myrtle Beach Air Force Base, when the regular Air Force replaced the Air National Guard units that had been there since the Pueblo Crisis. It was inactivated the following year.

The squadron was activated with Fairchild Republic A-10 Thunderbolt IIs in 1978 as the 81st Fighter Wing doubled its tactical strength. It participated in Operation Desert Storm before inactivating the following year.

== History ==
=== World War II ===
The squadron was originally activated at Drew Field, Florida on 1 March 1943 as the 626th Bombardment Squadron, one of the four original squadrons of the 405th Bombardment Group. It was initially equipped with Douglas A-24 Banshees and Bell P-39 Airacobras. Although retaining the same mission and equipment, in August the squadron was renamed the 511th Fighter-Bomber Squadron. The following month, it moved to Walterboro Army Air Field, South Carolina, where it began to fly the Republic P-47 Thunderbolts, with which it would be equipped for the rest of World War II. On 14 February 1944, the 509th left its training base for the European Theater of Operations.

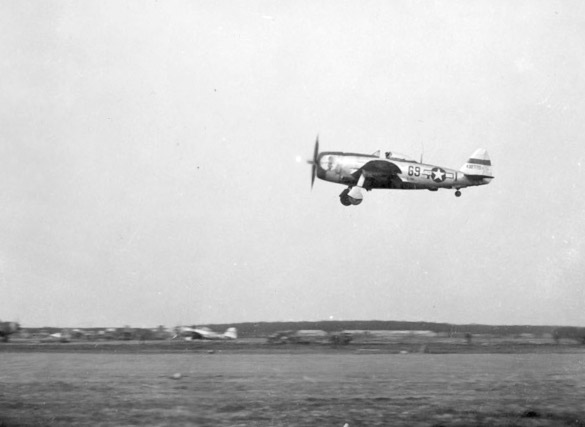
405th Fighter Group P-47D

The squadron arrived at its first station in the theater, RAF Christchurch, England in early March 1944 and flew its first combat mission the following month. It dropped the "bomber" portion of its designation in May, but retained the fighter bomber mission. The 509th helped prepare for Operation Overlord, the invasion of Normandy, by striking military airfields, and lines of communication, particularly bridges and railroad marshalling yards. On D-Day, it flew combat patrols in the vicinity of Brest, France, and in the following days flew armed reconnaissance missions over Normandy.

Toward the end of June, the squadron moved to Picauville Airfield, France, and for the rest of the war concentrated on providing close air support for ground forces. It supported Operation Cobra, the breakout at Saint Lo in July with attacks on military vehicles and artillery positions. The squadron engaged and destroyed a German armored column near Avranches, France, on 29 July 1944. After immobilizing leading and trailing elements of the 3-mile (4.8 km) long column, the rest of the tanks and trucks were systematically destroyed with multiple sorties. Its operations from D-Day through September 1944 supporting the liberation of Belgium earned the squadron a citation in the Order of the Day of the Belgian Army. The squadron received a Distinguished Unit Citation for action on 24 September 1944 when the 4th Armored Division experienced a counterattack by enemy forces and urgently needed air support. Elements of the 405th Group attacked the enemy armor despite an 800-foot ceiling that forced attacks to be made from low level in the face of intense flak. A second group element was unable to locate the tank battle because of the adverse weather, but located a reinforcing column of armor and trucks, causing major damage. A third element attacked warehouses and other buildings in the vicinity that were being used by the enemy. (Note: Both Maurer and Rust identify the 405th Group's three attacks as being made by one of the group's three squadrons. However, neither identifies which squadron was involved in which action. All three of the group's squadrons were awarded a DUC for the day's attacks. Maurer, Combat Units, pp. 290–291; Rust, p. 122.)

The squadron flew its last combat mission of the war on 8 May 1945. It briefly served in the occupation forces at AAF Station Straubing, but by 8 July was mostly a paper unit. Its remaining personnel returned to the United States in October and the squadron was inactivated upon arrival at the port of embarkation.

=== Reactivation as a fighter bomber unit ===
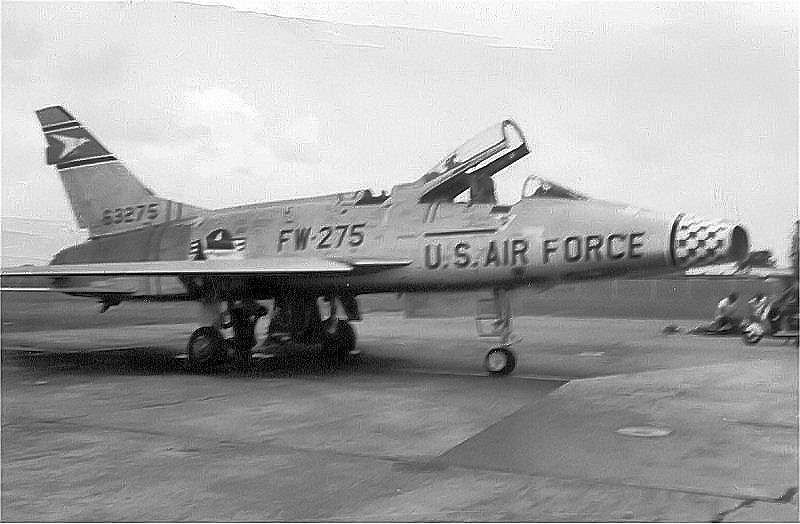
511th FDS F-100D Super Sabre 56-3275 about 1957

The squadron returned to its designation as the 511th Fighter-Bomber Squadron and was activated at Godman Air Force Base, Kentucky on 1 December 1952, when it assumed the mission, personnel and F-47 Thunderbolt aircraft of the 153d Fighter-Bomber Squadron, a Mississippi Air National Guard unit that had been called to active duty for the Korean War. However, Godman was not suitable for jet fighter operations, and in April 1953, the squadron moved to Langley Air Force Base, Virginia as the Air Force prepared to transfer Godman to the Army. After arriving at Langley, the squadron was able to upgrade to Republic F-84 Thunderjets, later upgrading to North American F-100 Super Sabres. The squadron was inactivated with the rest of the 405th Wing in July 1958.

Following the Pueblo Crisis of 1968, the 354th Tactical Fighter Wing moved to Korea to reinforce United States forces there. The 113th Tactical Fighter Wing of the District of Columbia Air National Guard was called to active duty and took the 354th Wing's place at Myrtle Beach Air Force Base, South Carolina. In April 1970, the 113th Wing was returned to the Guard, and Tactical Air Command activated the 4554th Tactical Fighter Wing in its place. The squadron, now named the 511th Tactical Fighter Squadron was activated along with it. In June, the 354th Wing returned on paper to Myrtle Beach from Korea and the squadron became one of its components, although it did not become operational until 8 September. The squadron flew LTV A-7 Corsair II aircraft until June 1971, when it was inactivated and replaced by the 353d Tactical Fighter Squadron, which simultaneously moved to Myrtle Beach from Torrejon Air Base, Spain without personnel or equipment.

==== A-10 "Warthog" operations ====
The squadron was activated at RAF Bentwaters, England in October 1978 as the 81st Tactical Fighter Wing changed its mission to close air support and air interdiction, equipped with Fairchild Republic A-10 Thunderbolt IIs, and expanded from three to six operational squadrons. The squadron participated in joint and combined exercises with American and British ground forces and periodically deployed to designated wartime operating bases, including Sembach Air Base, Germany.

The squadron was reassigned to the 10th Tactical Fighter Wing at RAF Alconbury in June 1988 in a United States Air Forces in Europe (USAFE) dispersal of its Warthogs. The squadron was one of the first USAFE units to deploy to defend Saudi Arabia after Iraq's invasion of Kuwait, deploying to Saudi Arabia along with supporting elements of the 10th Wing.

The squadron engaged in combat operations from January to February 1991 destroying numbers of Iraqi tanks and other armor as part of Operation Desert Storm. One 511th pilot was responsible for an extremely rare air-to-air kill of a Mil Mi-8 "Hip" helicopter (one of only two air-to-air A-10 kills of the war). Aircraft contributed significantly to destruction of hundreds of enemy vehicles and many of their occupants on the "Highway of Death, leading to President George H. W. Bush's decision to declare a cessation of hostilities on the next day.

The squadron returned to England in June 1991, but was drawn down as part of previously planned inactivation at the end of 1992.

== Lineage ==
- Constituted as the 626th Bombardment Squadron (Dive) on 4 February 1943

Activated on 1 March 1943
Redesignated 511th Fighter-Bomber Squadron on 10 August 1943
Redesignated 511th Fighter Squadron on 30 May 1944
Inactivated on 15 October 1945

- Redesignated 511th Fighter-Bomber Squadron on 15 October 1952

Activated on 1 December 1952
Inactivated in July 1958

- Redesignated 511th Tactical Fighter Squadron

Activated on 1 April 1970
Inactivated on 15 July 1971

- Activated on 1 January 1980

inactivated on 39 December 1992

=== Assignments ===
- 405th Bombardment Group (later 405th Fighter-Bomber Group, 405th Fighter Group), 1 March 1943 – 15 October 1945
- 405th Fighter-Bomber Group, 1 December 1952
- 405th Fighter-Bomber Wing, 8 October 1957 – 1 July 1958
- 4554th Tactical Fighter Wing, 1 April 1970
- 354th Tactical Fighter Wing] 1 June 1970 – 15 July 1971
- 81st Tactical Fighter Wing, 1 January 1980
- 10th Tactical Fighter Wing, 1 September 1988 – 30 December 1992. (attached to 354th Tactical Fighter Wing (Provisional), 15 August 1990 – 25 March 1991)

=== Stations ===
- Drew Field, Florida, 1 March 1943
- Walterboro Army Air Field, South Carolina, 14 September 1943 – 14 February 1944
- RAF Christchurch (AAF-416), England, 6 March–22 June 1944
- Picauville Airfield (A-8), France, 29 June 1944
- St-Dizier Airfield (A-64), France, 14 September 1944
- Ophoven Airfield (Y-32), Belgium, 9 February 1945
- Kitzingen Airfield (R-6), Germany, 23 April 1945
- AAF Station Straubing (R-68), Germany, c. 13 May–2 July 1945
- Camp Shanks, New York, 19 October 1945
- Godman Air Force Base, Kentucky, 1 December 1952
- Langley Air Force Base, Virginia, 17 April 1953 – 1 July 1958
- Myrtle Beach Air Force Base, South Carolina, 1 April 1970 – 15 July 1971
- RAF Bentwaters, England, 1 January 1980
- RAF Alconbury, England, 1 September 1988 – 30 December 1992 (The 511th TFS deployed to King Fahd International Airport, Saudi Arabia, 22 December 1990 – 16 June 1991)

=== Aircraft ===
- Douglas A-24 Banshee, 1943
- Bell P-39 Airacobra, 1943
- Republic P-47 Thunderbolt, 1943–1945, 1952
- Republic F-84 Thunderjet, 1953–1956
- North American F-100 Super Sabre, 1956–1958
- LTV A-7 Corsair II, 1970–1971
- Republic Fairchild A-10 Thunderbolt II, 1980–1992

=== Awards and campaigns ===
Award streamer	Award	Dates	Notes
	Distinguished Unit Citation	24 September 1944	511th Fighter Squadron
	Air Force Outstanding Unit Award	15 June 1971-14 July 1971	511th Tactical Fighter Squadron
	Air Force Outstanding Unit Award	1 July 1979-30 June 1981	511th Tactical Fighter Squadron
	Air Force Outstanding Unit Award	1 July 1981-30 June 1983	511th Tactical Fighter Squadron
	Air Force Outstanding Unit Award	1 June 1989-31 May 1991	511th Tactical Fighter Squadron
	Air Force Outstanding Unit Award	1 June 1991-30 May 1992	511th Tactical Fighter Squadron

Campaign Streamer	Campaign	Dates	Notes
	Air Offensive, Europe	7 March 1944 – 5 June 1944	511th Fighter-Bomber Squadron (later 511th Fighter Squadron)
	Air Combat, EAME Theater	7 March 1944 – 11 May 1945	511th Fighter-Bomber Squadron (later 511th Fighter Squadron)
	Normandy	6 June 1944 – 24 July 1944	511th Fighter Squadron
	Northern France	25 July 1944 – 14 September 1944	511th Fighter Squadron
	Rhineland	15 September 1944 – 21 March 1945	511th Fighter Squadron
	Ardennes-Alsace	16 December 1944 – 25 January 1945	511th Fighter Squadron
