= 510th Fighter Squadron =

510th Fighter Squadron

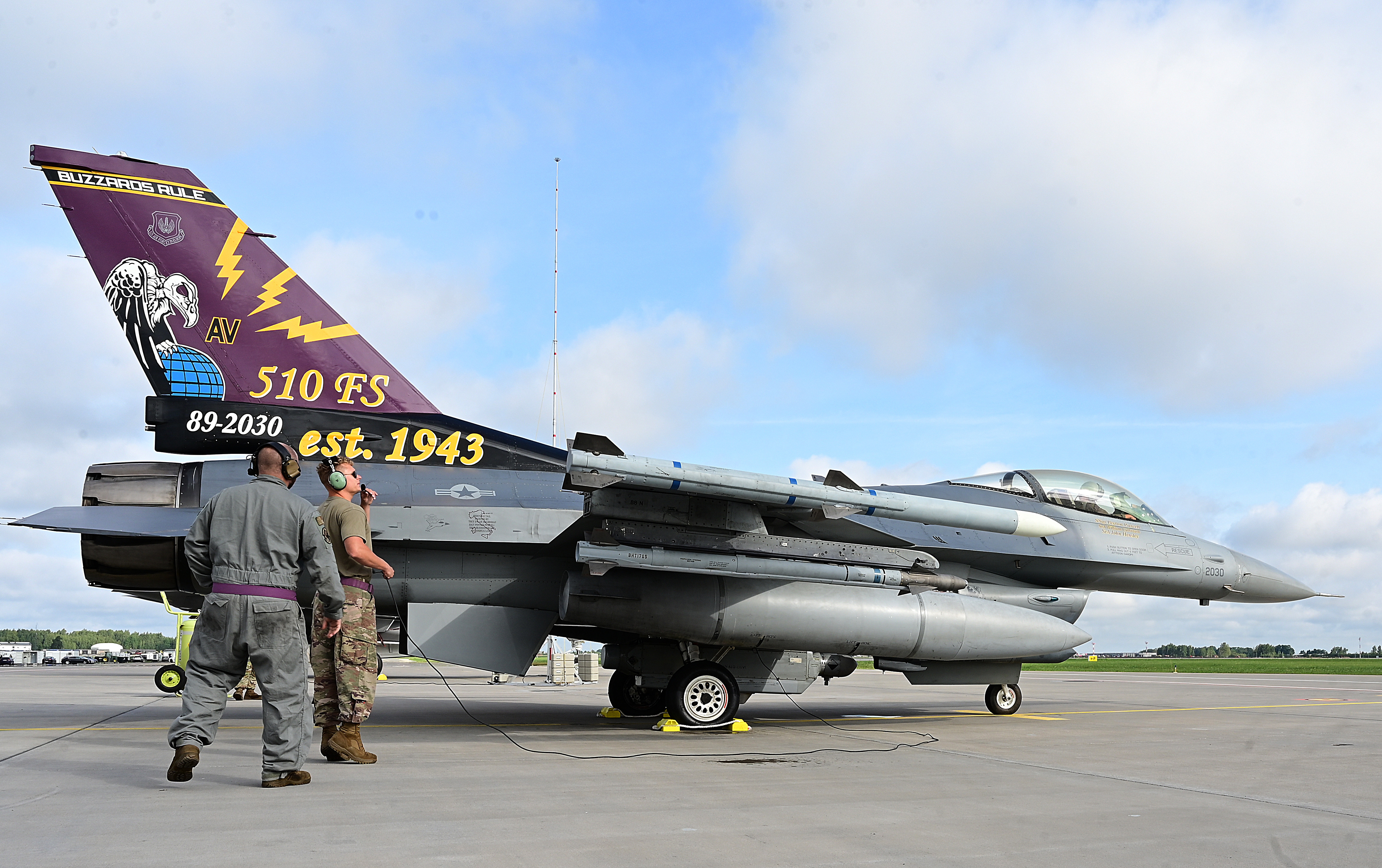
- 510th Fighter Squadron F-16 Fighting Falcon (Note: Aircraft is General Dynamics F-16C Block 40E Fighting Falcon serial 89-2030.)
- Active: 1943–1945; 1952–1958; 1959–1969; 1978–1994; 1994–present
- Country: United States
- Branch: United States Air Force
- Role: Fighter
- Part of: United States Air Forces in Europe – Air Forces Africa: Third Air Force; 31st Fighter Wing; 31st Operations Group
- Garrison/HQ: Aviano Air Base, Italy
- Nickname: Buzzards
- Motto: Buzzards Rule
- Colors: Purple
- Mascot: Buzz
- Decorations: Distinguished Unit Citation; Presidential Unit Citation; Air Force Outstanding Unit Award with Combat "V" Device; Air Force Outstanding Unit Award; Cited in the Order of the Day, Belgian Army; Republic of Vietnam Gallantry Cross with Palm

Insignia
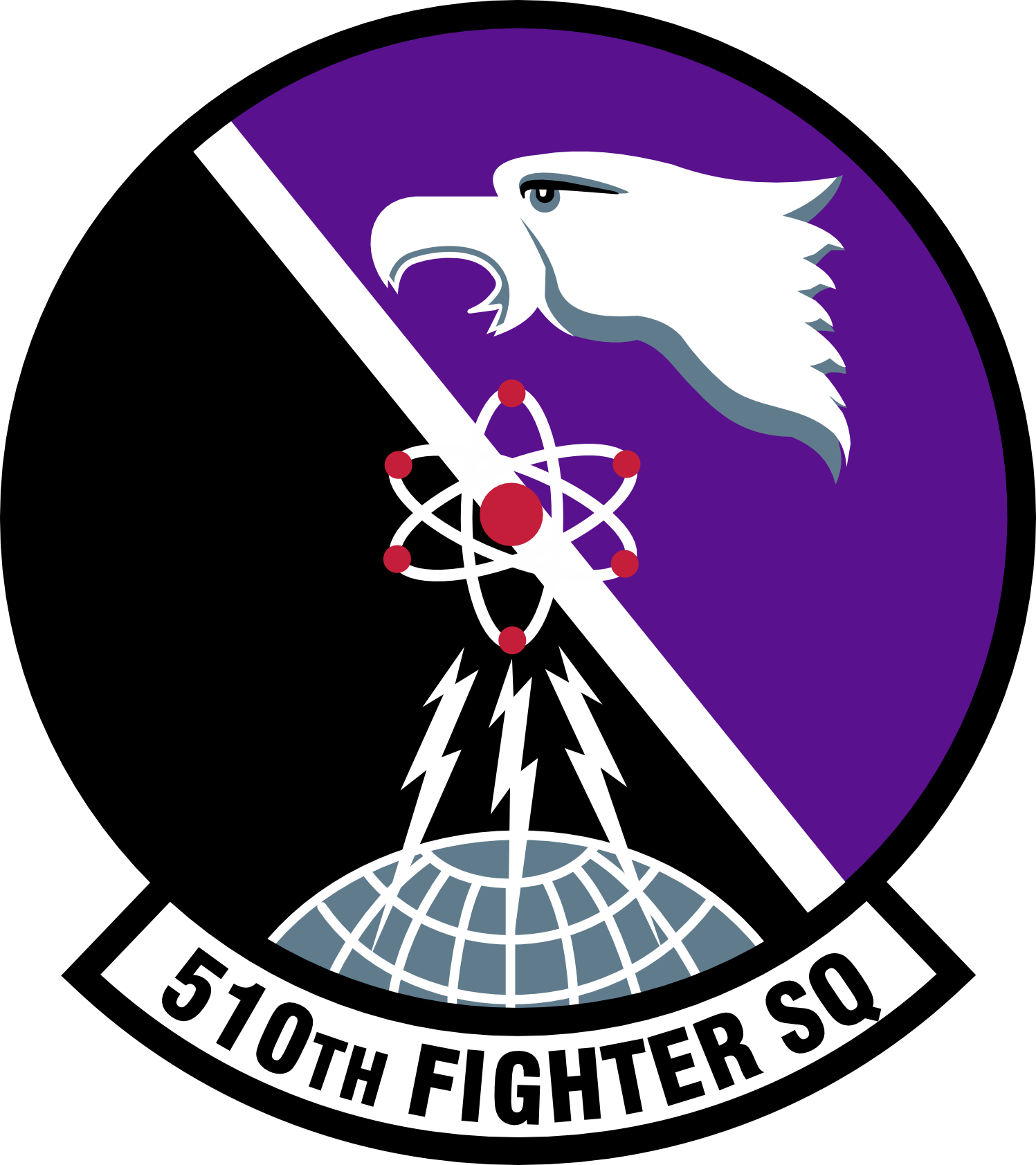
- 510th Fighter Squadron emblem (Note: Approved 8 May 2007.)

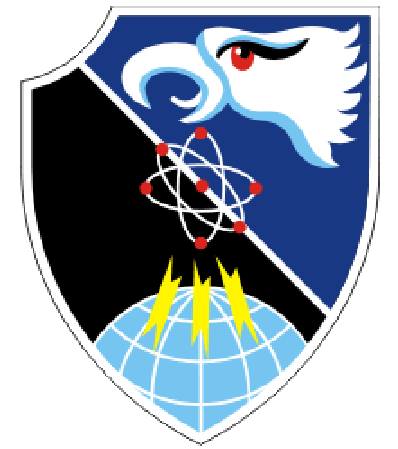
- 510th Fighter-Bomber Sq emblem (Note: Approved 14 February 1957. Description: On a shield per bend royal purple and black; between a bendlet white, a falcon's head erased, of the last [color mentioned], shaded light brown, eye and pupil indicated in black; his beak open; and issuing from base a demi sphere light blue, outline and grid lines white; centered on the bendlet an atomic symbol of three entwined elliptical rings around a red atom; the perimeter of the rings marked with six smaller atoms; three lightning bolts radiating downward from the symbol all white; a diminutive border around the shield of the last [color mentioned].)

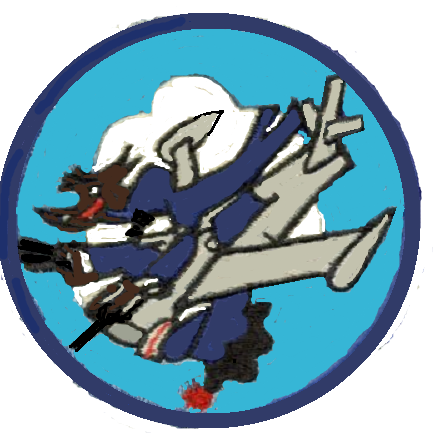
- 510th Fighter-Bomber Sq emblem (Note: Approved 8 September 1953.)

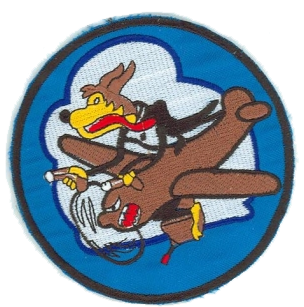
- 510th Fighter Sq emblem (Note: Approved 7 July 1944.)

The 510th Fighter Squadron is part of the 31st Operations Group at Aviano Air Base, Italy. It is a combat-ready F-16CM fighter squadron prepared to deploy and fly combat sorties as tasked by NATO and US combatant commanders.

The squadron was first activated as the 625th Bombardment Squadron in 1943, changing to the 510th Fighter-Bomber Squadron a few months later. After training in the United States, it moved to England in March 1944, helping prepare for Operation Overlord by attacking targets in France. Following D-Day, the squadron moved to the continent, providing close air support for Allied forces. The squadron earned a Distinguished Unit Citation and was cited in the Order of the Day by the Belgian Army. After V-E Day the squadron returned to the United States and was inactivated at the port of embarkation.

The squadron was activated again in 1952, when it replaced an Air National Guard squadron that had been mobilized for the Korean War. It trained for fighter bomber operations until inactivating in 1958. A year later, it was activated in the Philippines as the 510th Tactical Fighter Squadron. The squadron returned to the United States in 1964, but soon deployed back to the Pacific, moving to Vietnam in 1965, and engaging in combat until inactivating in 1969 as the United States began withdrawing forces from Vietnam.

The squadron was activated with Fairchild Republic A-10 Thunderbolt IIs in 1978 as the 81st Fighter Wing doubled its tactical strength. It moved to Germany in 1992 and was inactivated there in 1994. A few weeks later, the squadron was reactivated in its current role.

== Mission ==
The 510th performs strategic attack, air interdiction, combat search and rescue, close air support, and forward air control-airborne forces missions. The squadron employs a full range of precision ordnance.

== History ==
=== World War II ===
The squadron was originally activated at Drew Field, Florida on 1 March 1943 as the 625th Bombardment Squadron, one of the four original squadrons of the 405th Bombardment Group. It was initially equipped with Douglas A-24 Banshees and Bell P-39 Airacobras. Although retaining the same mission and equipment, in August the squadron was renamed the 510th Fighter-Bomber Squadron. The following month, it moved to Walterboro Army Air Field, South Carolina, where it began to fly the Republic P-47 Thunderbolts, with which it would be equipped for the rest of World War II. On 14 February 1944, the 510th left its training base for the European Theater of Operations.

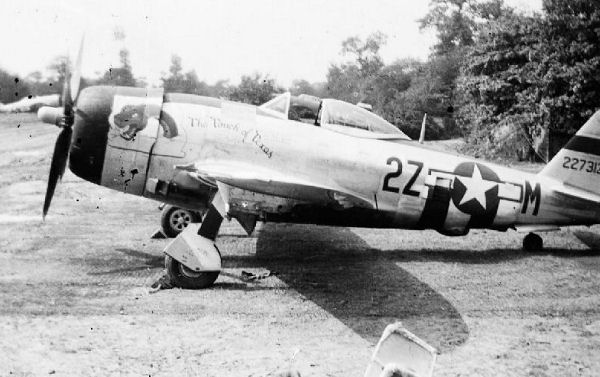
P-47D Thunderbolt of the 510th Fighter Squadron (Note: Aircraft is Republic P-47D-27-RE Thunderbolt, serial 42-27312, fuselage code 2Z-M at RAF Christchurch in 1944.)

The squadron arrived at its first station in the theater, RAF Christchurch, England in early March 1944 and flew its first combat mission the following month. It dropped the "bomber" portion of its designation in May, but retained the fighter bomber mission. The 510th helped prepare for Operation Overlord, the invasion of Normandy, by striking military airfields, and lines of communication, particularly bridges and railroad marshalling yards. On D-Day, it flew combat patrols in the vicinity of Brest, France, and in the following days flew armed reconnaissance missions over Normandy.

Toward the end of June, the squadron moved to Picauville Airfield, France, and for the rest of the war concentrated on providing close air support for ground forces. It supported Operation Cobra, the breakout at Saint Lo in July with attacks on military vehicles and artillery positions. The squadron engaged and destroyed a German armored column near Avranches, France, on 29 July 1944. After immobilizing leading and trailing elements of the 3-mile (4.8 km) long column, the rest of the tanks and trucks were systematically destroyed with multiple sorties. Its operations from D-Day through September 1944 supporting the liberation of Belgium earned the squadron a citation in the Order of the Day of the Belgian Army. The squadron received a Distinguished Unit Citation for action on 24 September 1944 when the 4th Armored Division experienced a counterattack by enemy forces and urgently needed air support. Elements of the 405th Group attacked the enemy armor despite an 800-foot ceiling that forced attacks to be made from low level in the face of intense flak. A second group element was unable to locate the tank battle because of the adverse weather, but located a reinforcing column of armor and trucks, causing major damage. A third element attacked warehouses and other buildings in the vicinity that were being used by the enemy. (Note: Both Maurer and Rust identify the 405th Group's three attacks as being made by one of the group's three squadrons. However, neither identifies which squadron was involved in which action. All three of the group's squadrons were awarded a DUC for the day's attacks. Maurer, Combat Units, pp. 290–291; Rust, p. 122.)

The squadron flew its last combat mission of the war on 8 May 1945. It was credited with the destruction of 30 enemy aircraft. (Note: The Aviano Air Base Fact Sheet for the squadron claims 39 aircraft were destroyed by the squadron.) It briefly served in the occupation forces at AAF Station Straubing, but by 8 July was mostly a paper unit. Its remaining personnel returned to the United States in October and the squadron was inactivated upon arrival at the port of embarkation.

=== Reactivation as a fighter bomber unit ===
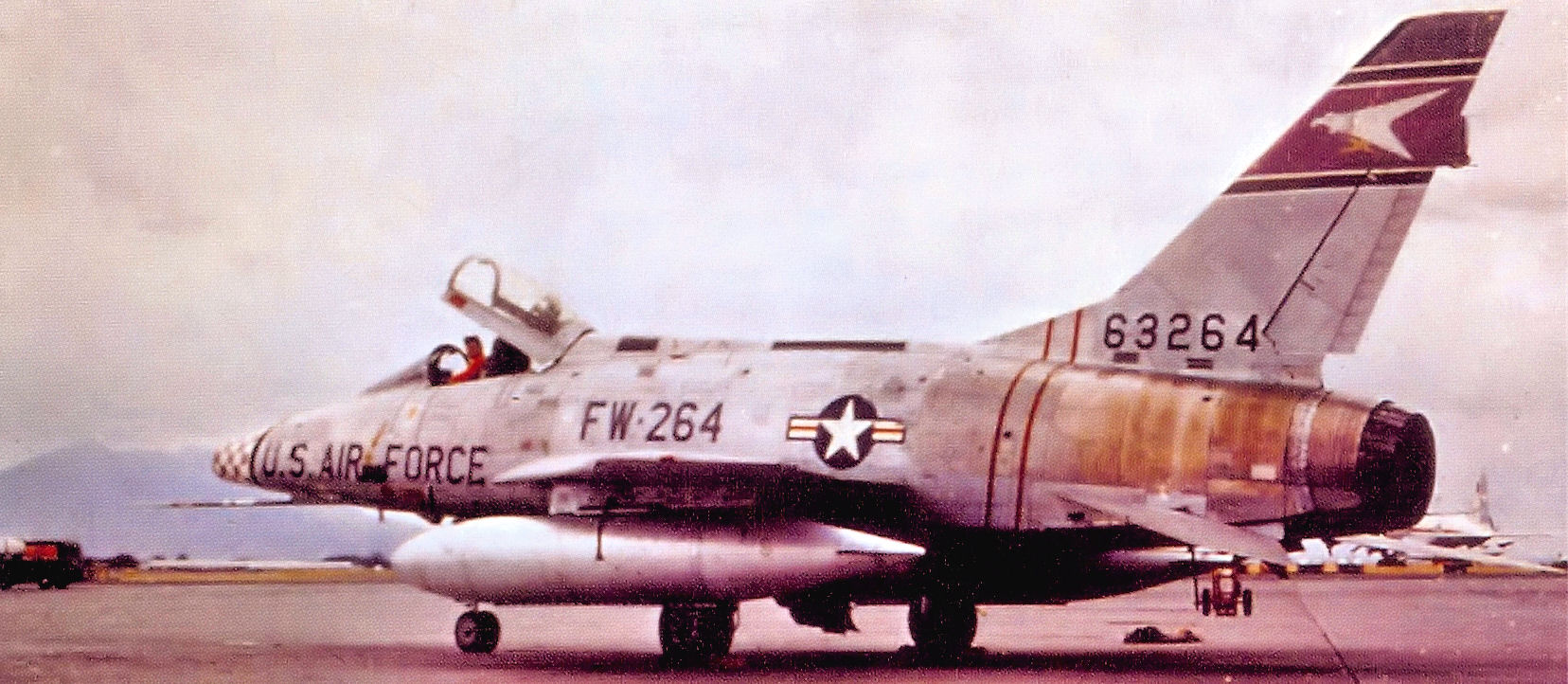
510th F-100D Super Sabre (Note: Aircraft is North American F-100D-90-NA Super Sabre, serial 56-3264 at Clark Air Base, Philippines, December 1961. This aircraft remained with the 510th until being shot down on 22 August 1967 on a combat mission from Bien Hoa Air Base, South Vietnam.)

The squadron returned to its designation as the 510th Fighter-Bomber Squadron and was activated at Godman Air Force Base, Kentucky on 1 December 1952, when it assumed the mission, personnel and F-47 Thunderbolt aircraft of the 149th Fighter-Bomber Squadron, a Virginia Air National Guard unit that had been called to active duty for the Korean War. However, Godman was not suitable for jet fighter operations, and in April 1953, the squadron moved to Langley Air Force Base, Virginia as the Air Force prepared to transfer Godman to the Army. After arriving at Langley, the squadron was able to upgrade to Republic F-84 Thunderjets, and later to North American F-100 Super Sabres. The squadron became non-operational on 15 April 1958 and was inactivated with the rest of the 405th Wing in July 1958.

In 2014, a description of Stu Roosa's time as an astronaut described how the 510th had been charged to deploy to bases in West Germany to deliver nuclear weapons onto Soviet targets, eject, as fuel aboard their F-100s was not sufficient, and to escape and evade back to the West.

=== Vietnam War ===
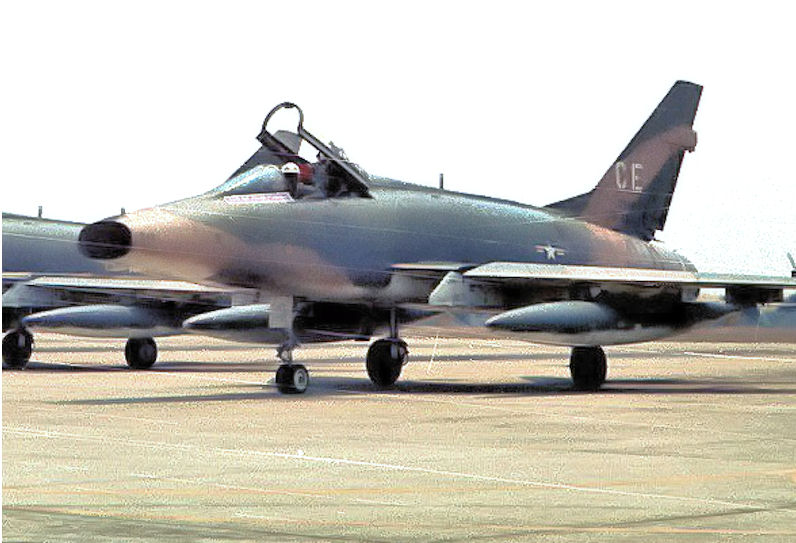
510th Tactical Fighter Squadron F-100 at Bien Hoa (Note: Aircraft is North American F-100D-90-NA Super Sabre, serial 56-3242. tail code CE, taken in 1968. this plane was shot down on 30 May 1970 while with the 531st Tactical Fighter Squadron. Baugher, Joe (14 February 2023). "1956 USAF Serial Numbers". Joe Baugher.)

The squadron was redesignated the 510th Tactical Fighter Squadron and activated in April 1959, when the 405th Fighter Wing replaced the 6200th Air Base Wing at Clark Air Base, Philippines. The squadron assumed the mission, personnel and F-100 Super Sabres of the 72d Tactical Fighter Squadron, which was simultaneously inactivated. In 1959, the squadron deployed twice to Chiayi Air Base in Taiwan, and deployed a detachment to Tainan Air Base from December 1959 to November 1965, and in spring 1962, to Takhli Royal Thai Air Force Base as part of Joint Task Force 116. The squadron left Clark in March 1964 for England Air Force Base, Louisiana, where the 3d Wing was reforming as a tactical fighter unit.

The squadron was not long at England before it returned to Clark, deploying there from May through August 1965, attached to its old headquarters, the 405th Fighter Wing. It was back in Louisiana for less than four months, for, in November it moved to Bien Hoa Air Base, South Vietnam as the 3d Wing replaced the 6251st Tactical Fighter Wing there. During its time at Bien Hoa, it frequently came under attack by Viet Cong rocket and mortar attacks. The squadron supported numerous ground operations with strike missions against enemy fortifications, supply areas, lines of communication and personnel, in addition to suppressing fire in landing areas. Along with the other F-100 squadrons at Bien Hoa, the squadron was frequently tasked with providing cover for Operation Ranch Hand missions flying from the base.

The squadron was deployed to Tainan Air Base, Taiwan from November 1965 to August 1967.

The 510th flew over 27,200 combat missions in Southeast Asia. In November 1969, the unit inactivated and its aircraft were distributed to other units in Vietnam.

=== Fighter operations in Europe ===
==== A-10 "Warthog" operations ====
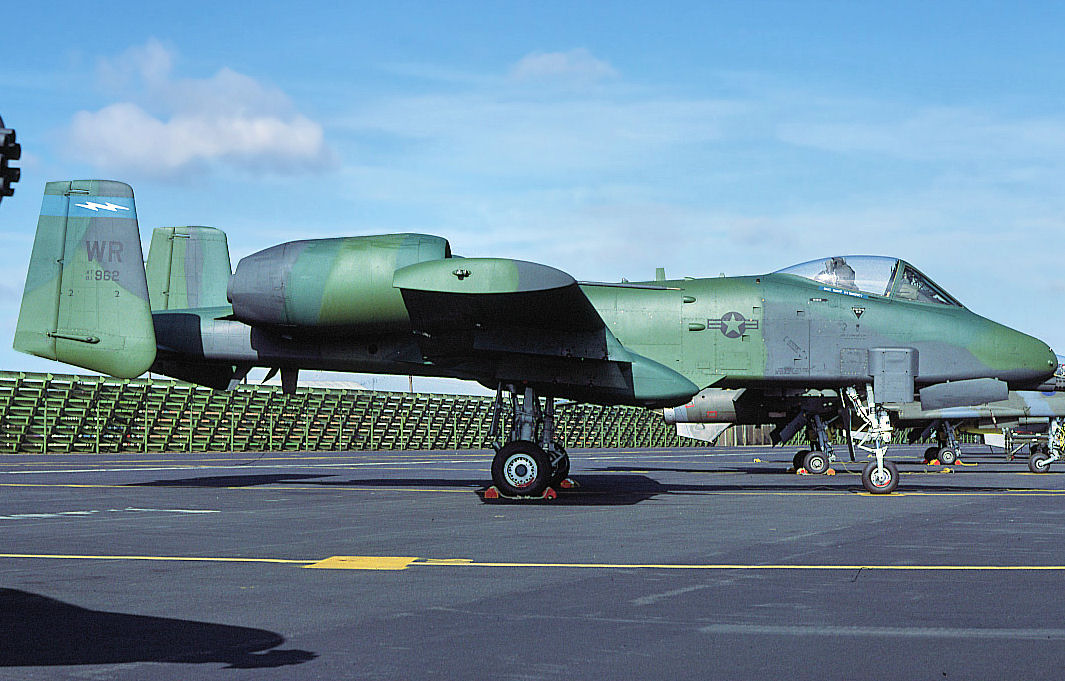
Squadron A-10A Thunderbolt II (Note: Aircraft is Fairchild A-10A Thunderbolt II, serial 81-0962, taken about 1990. This plane was later converted to an A-10C. It received special Southeast Asia camouflage paint in 2020 as part of Davis-Monthan Air Force Base's A-10 Demonstration Team. Baugher, Joe (3 March 2023). "1981 USAF Serial Numbers". Joe Baugher.)

The squadron was activated at RAF Bentwaters, England in October 1978 as the 81st Tactical Fighter Wing changed its mission to close air support and air interdiction, equipped with Fairchild Republic A-10 Thunderbolt IIs, and expanded from three to six operational squadrons. The squadron participated in joint and combined exercises with American and British ground forces and periodically deployed to designated wartime operating bases. The squadron deployed aircraft and personnel to Incirlik Air Base, Turkey for Operation Provide Comfort to support Kurdish relief in Northern Iraq from 6 September to 10 December 1991, 8 April to 10 June 1992, and from 6 August to 30 October 1992.

In the middle of this last deployment, on 1 October 1992, the squadron was reassigned to the 52d Operations Group at Spangdahlem Air Base, Germany. In January 1993, it moved to Spangdahlem and joined its parent group. During 1993 and 1994, the 510th flew more than 1,700 combat sorties from Aviano Air Base, Italy, in support of Operation Deny Flight. The squadron continued its attack mission until inactivating in March 1994.

==== F-16 "Viper" operations ====
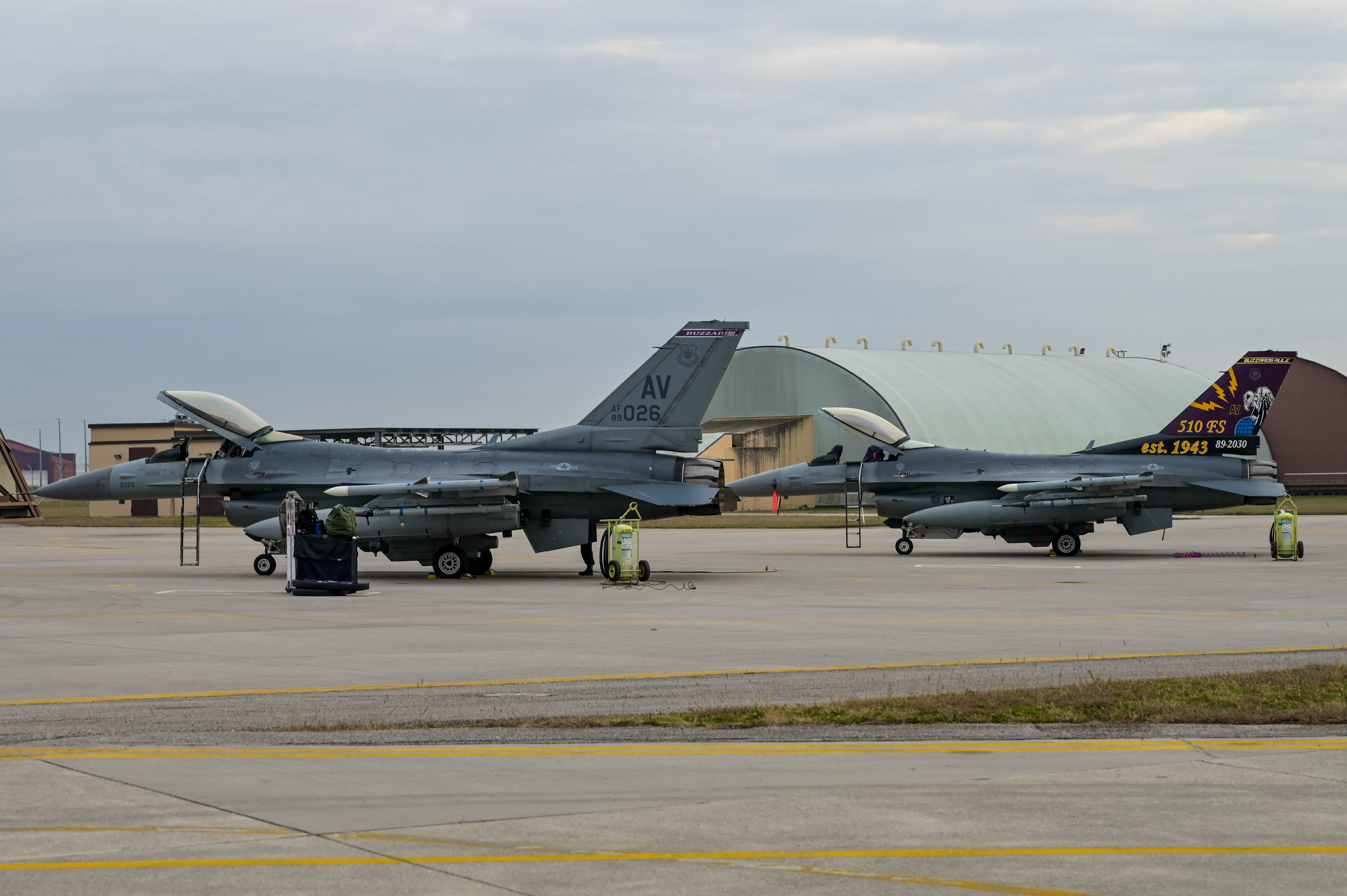
F-16C Fighting Falcons of the 510th Fighter Squadron at Aviano Air Base, Italy, 11 December 2023

The 510th was reactivated at Aviano Air Base, Italy on 1 July 1994 as the 510th Fighter Squadron. The squadron was equipped with General Dynamics F-16 Fighting Falcons made available from the 512th Fighter Squadron at Ramstein Air Base, Germany, which was inactivating as the 86th Fighter Wing became an airlift unit. The 510th, during Operation Deliberate Force, the 1995 NATO intervention in Bosnia, was the first F-16 Block 40 squadron to drop a laser-guided bomb. It also made the first combat use of night vision goggles in an F-16 during Operation Deliberate Guard, a follow-up operation. It was also one of the first F-16 units to become Forward Air Controllers (Airborne), and were the first controllers to employ the F-16 in combat.

In October 1998, the squadron deployed its F-16s to Incirlik Air Base, Turkey to fly in support of Operation Northern Watch. In Operation Allied Force, the air war over Serbia, the 510th flew more combat missions than any other F-16 squadron. Subsequently, the squadron was the first Aviano fighter squadron to deploy to Operation Southern Watch in June 2000. During those deployments the squadron engaged in combat operations over Iraq in both surface attack and combat search and rescue. From September to December 2002, the Buzzards returned to Operation Southern Watch and dropped 136,508 pounds of ordnance over Iraq to include the first use of the GBU-31A Joint Direct Attack Munition in F-16CG combat.

== Lineage ==
- Constituted as the 625th Bombardment Squadron (Dive) on 4 February 1943

Activated on 1 March 1943
Redesignated: 510th Fighter-Bomber Squadron on 10 August 1943
Redesignated: 510th Fighter-Bomber Squadron, Single Engine on 20 August 1943
Redesignated: 510th Fighter Squadron, Single Engine on 30 May 1944
Inactivated on 27 October 1945

- Redesignated 510th Fighter-Bomber Squadron on 15 October 1952

Activated on 1 December 1952
Inactivated on 1 July 1958

- Redesignated 510th Tactical Fighter Squadron on 11 March 1959

Activated on 9 April 1959
Inactivated on 15 November 1969

- Activated on 1 October 1978

Inactivated on 1 February 1994

- Redesignated 510th Fighter Squadron on 23 March 1994

Activated on 1 July 1994

=== Assignments ===
- 405th Bombardment Group (later 405th Fighter-Bomber Group, 405th Fighter Group), 1 March 1943 – 27 October 1945
- 405th Fighter-Bomber Group, 1 December 1952
- 405th Fighter-Bomber Wing, 8 October 1957 – 1 July 1958
- 405th Fighter Wing, 9 April 1959 (attached to Joint Task Force 116 16 May–8 June 1962)
- 3d Tactical Fighter Wing, 16 March 1964 – 15 November 1969 (attached to 405th Fighter Wing c. 8 May–17 August 1965)
- 81st Tactical Fighter Wing, 1 October 1978
- 52d Operations Group, 1 October 1992 – 1 February 1994
- 31st Operations Group, 1 July 1994 – present

=== Stations ===
- Drew Field, Florida, 1 March 1943 (1943)
- Walterboro Army Air Field, South Carolina, 13 September 1943 – 14 February 1944
- RAF Christchurch (AAF-416), England, 6 March–22 June 1944
- Picauville Airfield, (A-8), France, 30 June 1944
- Saint-Dizier Airfield (A-64), France, 11 September 1944
- Ophoven Airfield (Y-32), Belgium, 6 February 1945
- Kitzingen Airfield (R-6), Germany, 23 April 1945
- AAF Station Straubing (R-68), Germany, 14 May–2 July 1945
- Camp Kilmer, New Jersey, 25–27 October 1945
- Godman Air Force Base, Kentucky, 1 December 1952
- Langley Air Force Base, Virginia, 17 April 1953 – 1 July 1958
- Clark Air Base, Luzon, Philippines, 9 April 1959 – 14 March 1964 (deployed to Chiayi Air Base, Taiwan 1–8 July, 2–12 November 1959; Takhli Royal Thai Air Force Base, Thailand 11 May–8 June 1962)
- England Air Force Base, Louisiana, 16 March 1964 – 7 November 1965 (deployed to Clark Air Base, Philippines 8 May–20 August 1965)
- Bien Hoa Air Base, South Vietnam, 8 November 1965 – 15 November 1969
- RAF Bentwaters, England, 1 October 1978
- Spangdahlem Air Base, Germany, 4 January 1993 – 1 February 1994
- Aviano Air Base, Italy, 1 July 1994 – present

=== Aircraft ===
- Douglas A-24 Banshee (1943)
- Bell P-39 Airacobra (1943)
- Republic P-47 Thunderbolt (1943–1945)
- Republic F-84F Thunderstreak (1953–1956)
- North American F-100 Super Sabre (1959–1969)
- Fairchild Republic A-10 Thunderbolt II (1979–1994)
- General Dynamics F-16 Fighting Falcon (1994 – present)

=== Awards and campaigns ===
Award streamer	Award	Dates	Notes
	Distinguished Unit Citation	24 September 1944	510th Fighter Squadron
	Presidential Unit Citation	8 June 1966–16 April 1967	510th Tactical Fighter Squadron
	Presidential Unit Citation	6 March 1968–31 July 1969	510th Tactical Fighter Squadron
	Air Force Outstanding Unit Award with Combat "V" Device	31 January 1968-5 March 1968	510th Tactical Fighter Squadron
	Air Force Outstanding Unit Award with Combat "V" Device	1 August 1969-16 November 1969	510th Tactical Fighter Squadron
	Air Force Outstanding Unit Award with Combat "V" Device	1 February 2000–31 May 2000	510th Tactical Fighter Squadron
	Air Force Outstanding Unit Award	1 November 1960-30 June 1961	510th Tactical Fighter Squadron
	Air Force Outstanding Unit Award	1 May 1964–16 July 1965	510th Tactical Fighter Squadron
	Air Force Outstanding Unit Award	1 July 1979–30 June 1981	510th Tactical Fighter Squadron
	Air Force Outstanding Unit Award	1 July 1981–30 June 1983	510th Tactical Fighter Squadron
	Air Force Outstanding Unit Award	1 June 1989–31 May 1991	510th Tactical Fighter Squadron
	Air Force Outstanding Unit Award	1 June 1991–30 June 1993	510th Tactical Fighter Squadron
	Air Force Outstanding Unit Award	1 October 1992-30 June 1993	510th Tactical Fighter Squadron
	Air Force Outstanding Unit Award	1 April 1994-1 April 1996	510th Fighter Squadron
	Air Force Outstanding Unit Award	2 April 1996-1 April 1998	510th Fighter Squadron
	Air Force Outstanding Unit Award	2 April 1998-1 April 2000	510th Fighter Squadron
	Air Force Outstanding Unit Award	24 March 1999-18 June 1999	510th Fighter Squadron
	Air Force Outstanding Unit Award	1 October 2000-1 October 2002	510th Fighter Squadron
	Air Force Outstanding Unit Award	2 October 2002–30 September 2004	510th Fighter Squadron
	Air Force Outstanding Unit Award	1 June 2009–31 May 2011	510th Fighter Squadron
	Vietnamese Gallantry Cross with Palm	25 November 1965–19 May 1969	510th Tactical Fighter Squadron
	Vietnamese Gallantry Cross with Palm	1 April 1966–15 November 1969	510th Tactical Fighter Squadron

Campaign Streamer	Campaign	Dates	Notes
	Air Offensive, Europe	7 March 1944 – 5 June 1944	510th Fighter-Bomber Squadron (later 510th Fighter Squadron)
	Air Combat, EAME Theater	7 March 1944 – 11 May 1945	510th Fighter-Bomber Squadron (later 510th Fighter Squadron)
	Normandy	6 June 1944 – 24 July 1944	510th Fighter Squadron
	Northern France	25 July 1944 – 14 September 1944	510th Fighter Squadron
	Rhineland	15 September 1944 – 21 March 1945	510th Fighter Squadron
	Ardennes-Alsace	16 December 1944 – 25 January 1945	510th Fighter Squadron
	Central Europe	22 March 1944 – 21 May 1945	510th Fighter Squadron
	Vietnam Defensive	8 November 1965 – 30 January 1966	510th Tactical Fighter Squadron
	Vietnam Air	31 January 1966 – 28 June 1966	510th Tactical Fighter Squadron
	Vietnam Air Offensive	29 June 1966 – 8 March 1967	510th Tactical Fighter Squadron
	Vietnam Air Offensive, Phase II	9 March 1967 – 31 March 1968	510th Tactical Fighter Squadron
	Vietnam Air/Ground	22 January 1968 – 7 July 1968	510th Tactical Fighter Squadron
	Vietnam Air Offensive, Phase III	1 April 1968 – 31 October 1968	510th Tactical Fighter Squadron
	Vietnam Air Offensive, Phase IV	1 November 1968 – 22 February 1969	510th Tactical Fighter Squadron
	Tet 1969/Counteroffensive	23 February 1969 – 8 June 1969	510th Tactical Fighter Squadron
	Vietnam Summer-Fall 1969	9 June 1969 – 31 October 1969	510th Tactical Fighter Squadron
	Vietnam Winter-Spring 1970	3 November 1969 – 30 April 1970	510th Tactical Fighter Squadron
	Southwest Asia Cease-Fire	12 April 1991 – 30 November 1995	510th Tactical Fighter Squadron (later 510th Fighter Squadron)
	Kosovo Air Campaign		510th Fighter Squadron
	Consolidation III	1 December 2006 – 30 June 2011	510th Fighter Squadron
	Iraqi Governance	29 June 2004 – 15 December 2005	510th Fighter Squadron
	Iraqi Surge	10 January 2007 – 31 December 2008	510th Fighter Squadron

== See also ==
- List of United States Air Force fighter squadrons
- List of F-100 units of the United States Air Force
- General Dynamics F-16 Fighting Falcon operators
