= RAF Christchurch =

Former RAF station in Dorset, England

RAF Christchurch USAAF Station AAF-416
- Near Christchurch, Dorset in England
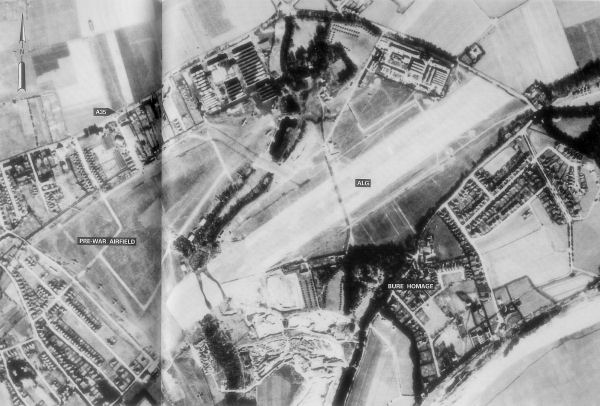
- Christchurch Airfield - 4 March 1944. Christchurch was unusual as it was constructed on an existing airfield. However the airfield used before the war for club and commercial flying was too small to accommodate wartime aircraft so the airfield was expanded by building further runway areas to the south of the existing.

Site information
- Type: Royal Air Force satellite station
- Code: XC
- Owner: Air Ministry
- Operator: Royal Air Force; United States Army Air Forces
- Controlled by: RAF Fighter Command 1941-44 * No. 10 Group RAF * No. 11 Group RAF; RAF Transport Command 1945 * No. 46 Group RAF

Location
- Shown within Dorset RAF Christchurch (the United Kingdom)
- Coordinates: 50°44′23″N 001°44′22″W

Site history
- Built: 1935 & 1941
- In use: 1941 - 1946
- Battles/wars: European theatre of World War II

Airfield information
- Elevation: 6 metres (20 ft) AMSL
Runways
Direction	Length and surface
00/00	Sommerfeld Tracking
00/00	Grass
00/00	Concrete
00/00	Unknown
00/00	Unknown

Royal Air Force Christchurch or more simply RAF Christchurch is a former Royal Air Force satellite station and was located southeast of the A337/B3059 junction in Somerford, Christchurch, Dorset, England.

Christchurch Airfield was a civil airfield that started operation from 1926, enlarged for wartime operations in 1941, Christchurch was used during the Second World War by the Royal Air Force and the United States Army Air Forces Ninth Air Force. It returned to civilian flying postwar before being taken over by what became British Aerospace to manufacture jet fighters and civilian airliner types. The airfield complex was finally closed down and demolished in 1966 when housing was built on the site.

== History ==
=== USAAF use ===
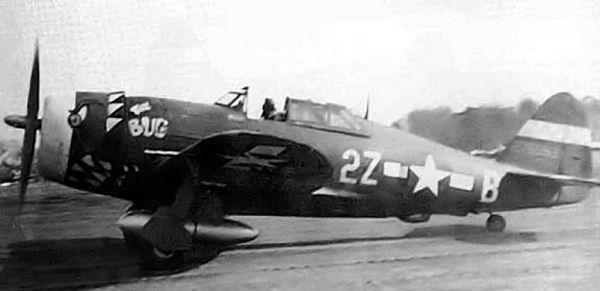
Republic P-47D-25-RE Thunderbolt 42-276552 of the 405th Fighter Group, 510th Fighter Squadron

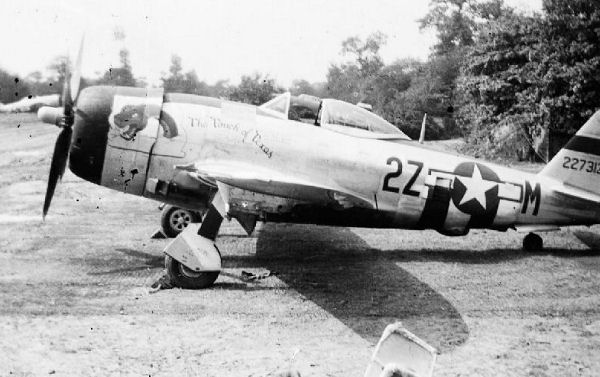
Republic P-47D-27-RE Thunderbolt 42-227312 of the 405th Fighter Group, 510th Fighter Squadron

In 1943, the USAAF Ninth Air Force required several temporary advanced landing grounds along the southern English Channel coast prior to the Normandy invasion to provide tactical air support for the ground forces landing in France. Christchurch was provided to support this mission.

Christchurch was known as USAAF Station AAF-416 for security reasons by the USAAF during the war, and by which it was referred to instead of location. Its USAAF Station Code was "CH".

==== 405th Fighter Group ====
Christchurch airfield saw the arrival of the USAAF 405th Fighter Group on 4 April 1944, the group arriving from Walterboro Army Airfield South Carolina. The 405th had the following operational squadrons:

- 509th Fighter Squadron (G9)
- 510th Fighter Squadron (2Z)
- 511th Fighter Squadron (K4)

The 405th was a group of Ninth Air Force's 84th Fighter Wing, IX Tactical Air Command. It flew the Republic P-47D Thunderbolt. The 405th moved to its Advanced Landing Ground at Picauville, France (ALG A-8) on 22 June 1944, ending the USAAF's use of Christchurch.

Additional units:

- 'H' Flight of No. 1 Anti-Aircraft Co-operation Unit RAF (October 1940 - July 1941)
- No. 89 Gliding School RAF (March 1944 - September 1955) became No. 622 Gliding School RAF (September 1955 - July 1963)
- No. 420 Flight RAF (September 1940)
- No. 2758 Squadron RAF Regiment
- No. 2773 Squadron RAF Regiment
- No. 2799 Squadron RAF Regiment
- No. 2888 Squadron RAF Regiment
- Air Defence Research and Development Establishment
- HQ and 'B' Flight of the Special Duty Flight RAF (May 1940 - Nov 1941)
- Detachment of Telecommunications Flying Unit RAF (November 1941 - May 1942)

== Current use ==
The airfield complex was demolished in 1966 and there is housing and The Runway Industrial Park located on the site.

== See also ==
- List of former Royal Air Force stations
