= 405th Air Expeditionary Group =

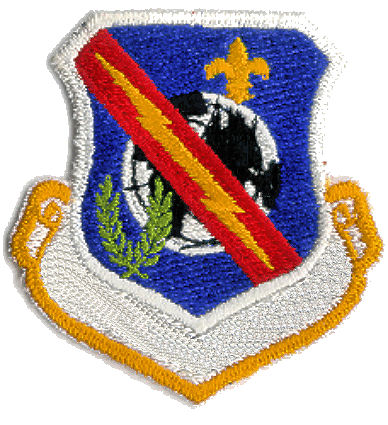
- Emblem of the 405th Air Expeditionary Group
- Active: 1943–1945; 1952–1957; 2001–present
- Country: United States
- Branch: United States Air Force
- Mascots: MOVERE ET AGGREDI – "Deploy and Attack"

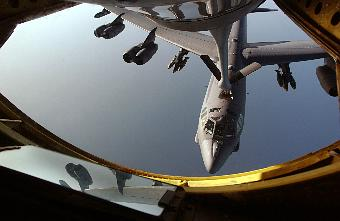
A B-52 being refueled over the Indian Ocean in June 1998, as seen from the refueling operator on a KC-135. The KC-135 crew is from the 931st Air Refueling Group at McConnell Air Force Base, KS, and was deployed to the 405th Air Expeditionary Wing to hit Iraq-associated targets during Operation Iraqi Freedom.

The 405th Air Expeditionary Group (405 AEG) was a provisional unit assigned to the United States Air Force Air Combat Command. The 405 EOG was believed to control Boeing Rockwell B-1B Lancer and B-52 Stratofortress operations over combat areas in Iraq and Afghanistan.

The group's World War II predecessor unit, the 405th Fighter Group was assigned to Ninth Air Force in England, flying its first combat mission on 1 May 1944. The group received a Distinguished Unit Citation for a mission in France on 24 September 1944; answering a request from Third Army for support near Laneuveville-en-Saulnois, two squadrons flying on instruments through rain and dense overcast, were directed by ground control toward a furious tank battle where, in spite of severe ground fire, one squadron repeatedly bombed and strafed enemy tanks; the second squadron, unable to find this target because of the weather, attacked a convoy of trucks and armored vehicles; later the same day, the third squadron hit warehouses and other buildings and silenced ground opposition in the area. It flew its last mission in early May 1945.

== History ==
For additional history and lineage, see 405th Air Expeditionary Wing

=== World War II ===
Media related to 405th Fighter Group (United States Army Air Forces) at Wikimedia Commons

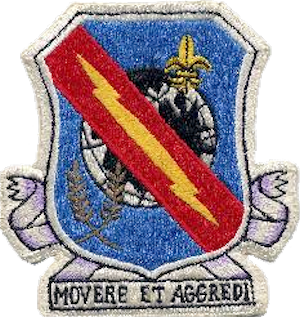
Emblem of the 405th Fighter Group

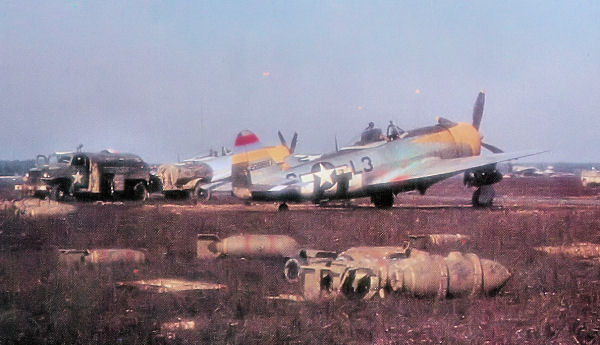
Republic P-47D Thunderbolts of a sister group (512th FS, 406th FG) at Advanced Landing Ground Y-29 in Asch, Belgium in March–April 1945

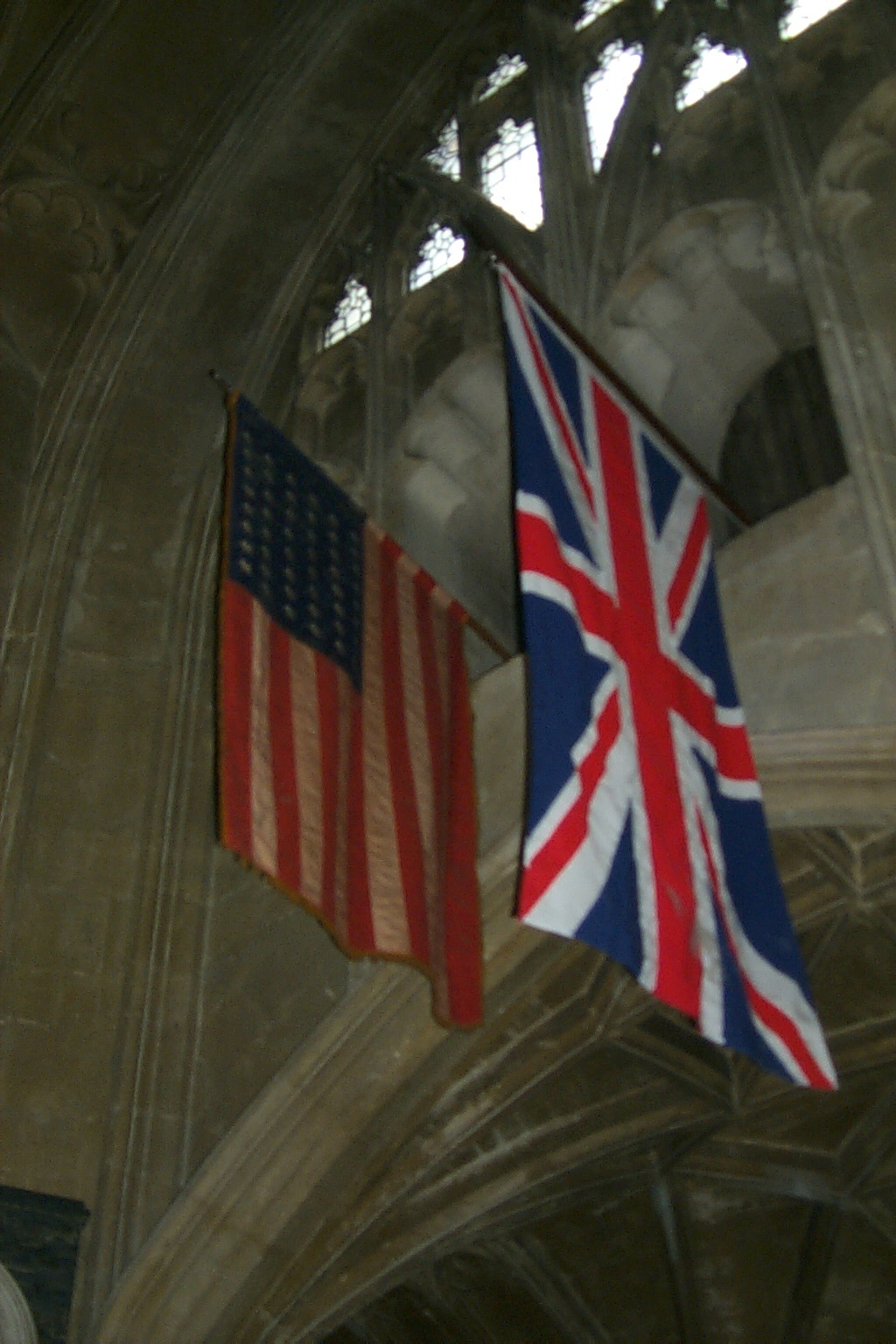
US Flag, a gift from the 405th, hangs in Christchurch Priory

The 405th Fighter Group was a fighter bomber unit of the United States Army Air Force in World War II. The group flew P-47 Thunderbolts in the European Theater of Operations (ETO) starting with the buildup to the Invasion of Normandy ("D-Day") through the end of the war in Europe. The 405th was a unit of the Ninth Air Force, IX Fighter Command, IX Tactical Air Command, 84th Fighter Wing. The 405th was primarily assigned to support Patton's Third Army. The group consisted of the 509th, 510th, and 511th Fighter Squadrons, plus headquarters elements. The group consisted of 73 aircraft.

The 405th Bombardment Group (Dive) was organized on 4 February 1943, at Drew Field near Tampa, Florida, and activated on 1 March 1943. The group was initially equipped with a few Douglass Dauntless and Curtis Helldiver dive bombers. The group gained some P-39 Airacobras before they left Drew. The group was redesignated as the 405th Fighter Bomber Group on 15 August 1943. In September 1943 the group moved to Walterboro, South Carolina. In Walterboro the group was outfitted with the original "razorback" design P-47 Thunderbolts. In February 1944 the group moved by train to a point of embarkation (POE) camp near New York City. The group soon embarked the RMS Mauretania for transport to England. After six days at sea, two of them in hurricane conditions, the group disembarked in Liverpool. The group traveled by train to Southampton then via lorrie to Christchurch, Dorset.

From March to 29 June 1944, the 405th operated out of the RAF Christchurch. After setting up camp and training over England, the group began combat operations over France. During this period their primary task was ground attack ahead of the coming Operation Overlord invasion of Normandy. The group disrupted German positions and transportation infrastructure. Train locomotives were a favorite target. The group destroyed the Seine River bridge at Mantes-Gassicourt, northeast of Paris, just before the invasion, to inhibit movement of German materiel. The group was grounded during the 6 June invasion activities because Allied command was concerned that inexperienced anti-aircraft batteries would mistake P-47s for the German Focke-Wulf Fw 190. The 405th resumed flying on 10 June, providing close air support to the beachhead. On 18 June 1944, the group was redesignated to the 405th Fighter Group. A few weeks after the invasion, the 405th packed up and moved to a POE near Southampton.

While encamped at Christchurch, the Group officers bivouacked in Bure Homage, an English manor adjacent to the airfield that was requisitioned by the British Ministry of Defence for the war.

The group's most notable action was the destruction of an entire German armored division near the town of Avaranches [sic], France on 29 July 1944. After immobilizing leading and trailing elements of the 3-mile (4.8 km) long column, the rest of the tanks and trucks were systematically destroyed with multiple sorties.

The 405th also accepted the surrender of the highly decorated Luftwaffe ace, Hans-Ulrich Rudel and his officers at the end of the war.

=== Cold War ===
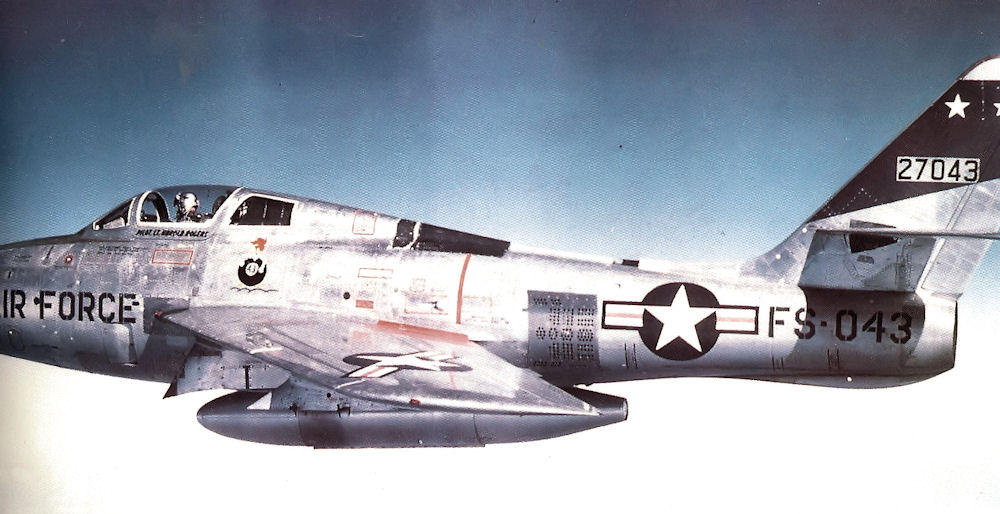
Republic F-84F-35-RE Thunderstreak 52-7043

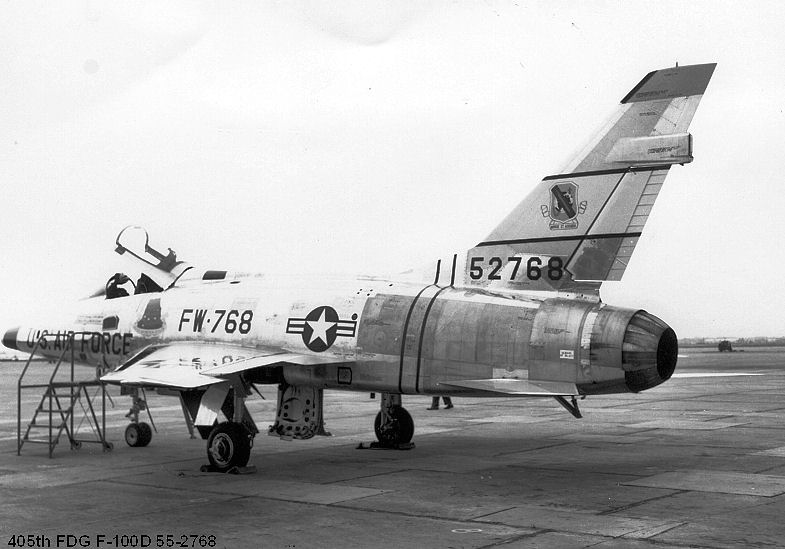
North American F-100D-40-NH Super Sabre 55-2768

The 405th Fighter-Bomber Wing and Group were activated on 1 December 1952 at Godman Air Force Base, Kentucky. The 405th replaced the 108th Fighter-Bomber Group which had been called to active federal service for the Korean War and was returned to the New Jersey Air National Guard and assumed its mission, equipment and personnel.

The group's 509th, 510th, and 511th Fighter-Bomber Squadrons also replaced the Air National Guard 141st, 149th and 153d Fighter-Bomber Squadrons. Initially equipped with F-47Ds and F-47N Thunderbolts inherited from the Air National Guard, the 405th was the last active duty USAF Thunderbolt fighter group.

On 1 May 1953, the F-47s were withdrawn and sent to AMARC, and the 405th was reassigned to Langley AFB, Virginia due to the programmed closing of Godman AFB on 1 September. At Langley, the 405th replaced the provisional 4430th Air Base Wing and was re-equipped with Republic F-84F Thunderstreak jet aircraft. Also attached to the group was the 422d Bombardment Squadron with Martin B-26 Invader light bombers (1 May – 20 December 1953) and the 429th Air Refueling Squadron (19 July 1954 – 8 October 1957) with KB-29 Superfortress tankers.

The group was heavily involved with operational training of TAC Thunderstreak pilots, both in gunnery and tactical bombardment, along with providing firepower demonstrations. The wing was committed to the TAC concept of the Composite Air Strike Force (CASF), which was, in part, to be prepared for rapid worldwide deployments. In September 1955 the 405th participated in Operation Mobile Able, a transatlantic exercise from Langley AFB to RAF Burtonwood, England. This was followed by Operation Sharkbait, which used McGuire AFB, New Jersey as a staging base en route to RAF Wethersfield, England.

Replaced F-84Fs with North American F-100 Super Sabre in December 1956, becoming TAC's first F-100 unit. Inactivated on 8 October 1957 when 405th FBW adopted Tri-Deputate organization plan and assigned all operational squadrons directly to the Wing.

=== Expeditionary operations ===
Reactivated as a provisional Expeditionary Operations Group after the 9/11/2001 terrorist attacks assigned to the 405th Air Expeditionary Wing, as part of Air Combat Command United States Air Forces Central.

Assigned Rockwell B-1B Lancer and possibly Boeing B-52H Stratofortress aircraft, along with various tankers and the 968th Expeditionary Airborne Air Control Squadron. The unit fought during the beginning of the War in Afghanistan (2001-2021) in 2001, and the 2003 invasion of Iraq. Aircraft and personnel were presumably drawn from both CONUS-based units as well as units assigned to USAFE or PACAF on regular deployment cycles.

During the first phase of Operation Iraqi Freedom, the group launched 10 aircraft and struck 240 planned targets with Global Positioning System-guided JDAMS 2,000-pound bombs. Since then, the unit conducted almost daily bombing missions as well as responding to calls for close air support from ground units.

== Lineage ==
- Constituted as the 405th Bombardment Group (Dive) on 4 February 1943

Activated on 4 February 1943
Redesignated as 405th Fighter-Bomber Group in August 1943
Redesignated as 405th Fighter Group in May 1944
Inactivated on 29 October 1945

- Reactivated as 405th Fighter-Bomber Group on 1 December 1952

Inactivated on 8 October 1957

- Redesignated 405th Tactical Training Group on 31 July 1985 (Remained inactive)
- Redesignated 405th Expeditionary Operations Group and converted to provisional status on 4 December 2001
- Redesignated 405th Air Expeditionary Group on 21 April 2010

=== Assignments ===
- III Fighter Command, 1 March 1943
- IX Fighter Command, 7 March 1944
- 303d Fighter Wing

Attached to: XIX Tactical Air Command, 1 August 1944

- 100th Fighter Wing

Attached to: XIX Tactical Air Command, 1 October 1944

- XXIX Tactical Air Command, 8 February – July 1945
- Army Service Forces, October 1945
- 405th Fighter-Bomber Wing, 1 December 1952 – 8 October 1957
- 405th Air Expeditionary Wing, 5 December 2001 – 21 April 2010

=== Components ===
- 509th Fighter (formerly 624th Bombardment) Squadron: 1 March 1943 – 15 October 1945; 1 December 1952 – 8 October 1957
- 510th Fighter (formerly 625th Bombardment) Squadron: 1 March 1943 – 15 October 1945; 1 December 1952 – 8 October 1957
- 511th Fighter (formerly 626th Bombardment) Squadron: 1 March 1943 – 15 October 1945; 1 December 1952 – 8 October 1957
- 627th Bombardment Squadron: 1 March–18 August 1943

=== Stations ===
- Drew Field, Florida, 1 March 1943
- Walterboro Army Airfield, South Carolina, 14 September 1943 – 14 February 1944
- RAF Christchurch (AAF-416), England, 7 March – 22 June 1944
- Picauville Airfield (A-8), France, 30 June 1944
- St-Dizier Airfield (A-64), France, 14 September 1944
- Ophoven Airfield (Y-32), Belgium, February 1945
- AAF Station Kitzingen (R-6), Germany, 30 April 1945
- AAF Station Straubing, Germany, 8 May–July 1945
- Camp Patrick Henry, Virginia, October-29 October 1945
- Godman Air Force Base, Kentucky, 1 December 1952
- Langley Air Force Base, Virginia, 16 April 1953 – 8 October 1957
- Thumrait Air Base, Oman, 5 December 2001 - July 2015
- Bagram Air Base, Afghanistan, 26 June 2019 – present

=== Aircraft ===
- B-1B (2001–present)
- KC-135R (2001–present)
- F-100 Super Sabre (1956–1958)
- KB-50 (1956–1958)
- VC-131 (1955)
- VC-54 (1955)
- C-119 (1954–1956)
- VC-47 (1954–1956)
- C-47 Skytrain (1954–1956)
- C-45 (1954–1956)
- KB-29 (1954–1956)
- RB-29 (1954)
- B-57 (1954–1957)
- RB-57 (1954–1957)
- L-20 (1953–1956)
- Sikorsky H-19 (1953–1956)
- Martin B-26 Marauder (1953–1956)
- B-45 Tornado (1953)
- F-84 (1953–1956)
- P/F-47 (1943–1945; 1952)
