= Picauville Airfield =

Picauville Airfield Advanced Landing Ground (ALG) A-8/A-8N
- Manche, Basse-Normandie Region, France
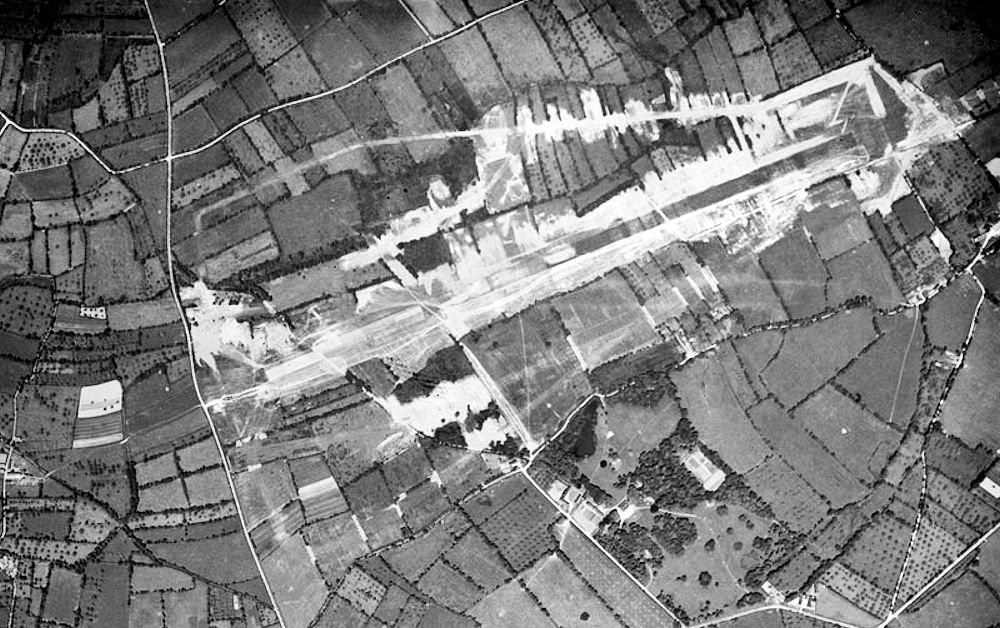
- Picauville Airfield (A-8N) after dismantling by the IX Engineering Command

Site information
- Type: Military Airfield
- Controlled by: United States Army Air Forces

Location
- Coordinates: 49°23′41″N 001°24′28″W

Site history
- Built by: IX Engineering Command
- In use: June–September 1944
- Materials: Prefabricated Hessian Surfacing (PHS)
- Battles/wars: World War II - EAME Theater: Normandy Campaign; Northern France Campaign

Garrison information
- Garrison: Ninth Air Force
- Occupants: 405th Fighter Group; 264 and 604 squadrons (RAF)

Airfield information
Runways
Direction	Length and surface
07/25	5,000 feet (1,520 m) SMT/PSP
- One runway, 4 alert pads, 50 hardstands

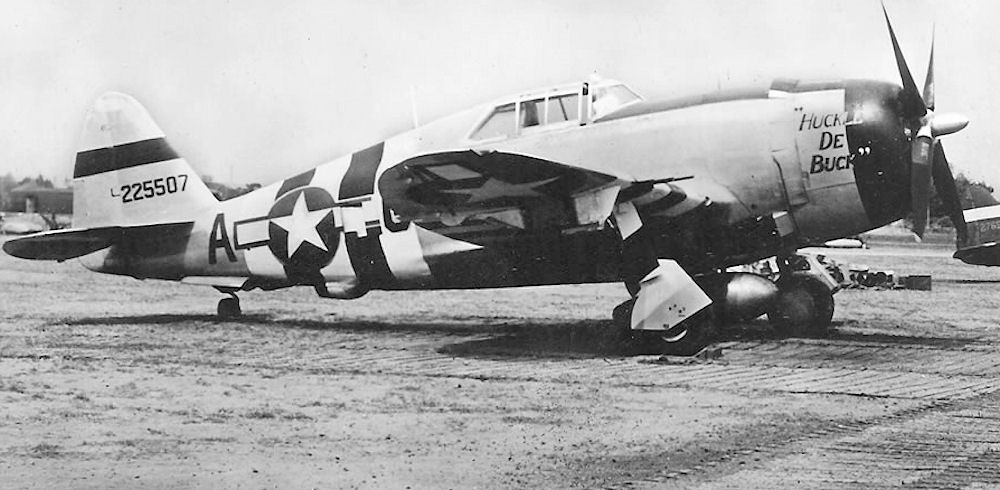
405th Fighter Group - P-47D 42-25507 at Picauville Airfield (A-8), France

Picauville Airfield is an abandoned World War II military airfield, which is located near the commune of Picauville in the Normandy region of northern France.

Located just outside Picauville, the United States Army Air Force established a temporary airfield shortly after D-Day on 20 June 1944, shortly after the Allied landings in France The airfield was one of the first established in the liberated area of Normandy, being constructed by the IX Engineering Command, 826th Engineer Aviation Battalion.

== History ==
Known as Advanced Landing Ground "A-8", the airfield consisted of a single Prefabricated Hessian Surfacing runway. In addition, with tents were used for billeting and also for support facilities; an access road was built to the existing road infrastructure; a dump for supplies, ammunition, and gasoline drums, along with a drinkable water and minimal electrical grid for communications and station lighting.

The airfield was home to the P-47D-equipped 405th Fighter Group. The fighter planes flew support missions during the Allied invasion of Normandy, patrolling roads in front of the beachhead; strafing German military vehicles and dropping bombs on gun emplacements, anti-aircraft artillery and concentrations of German troops when spotted. During July, the Group flew 300 missions. During those missions they had 11 pilots listed as MIA (Missing In Action) and another 4 as KIA (Killed In Action).

When German nightly incursions and attacks became more than a nuisance, RAF Mosquito night fighters were brought into Picauville. It made the airfield a major installation, because now it featured night landing equipment (hence the extra 'N' in the designation). Two squadrons of 2nd Tactical Air Force, 604 and 264 Squadron, equipped with Mosquito XII and XIII respectively, arrived on 6 and 11 August at Picauville. Both RAF squadrons served at Picauville until the first week of September, when both squadrons returned to England (604 Sqn via ALG B-6).

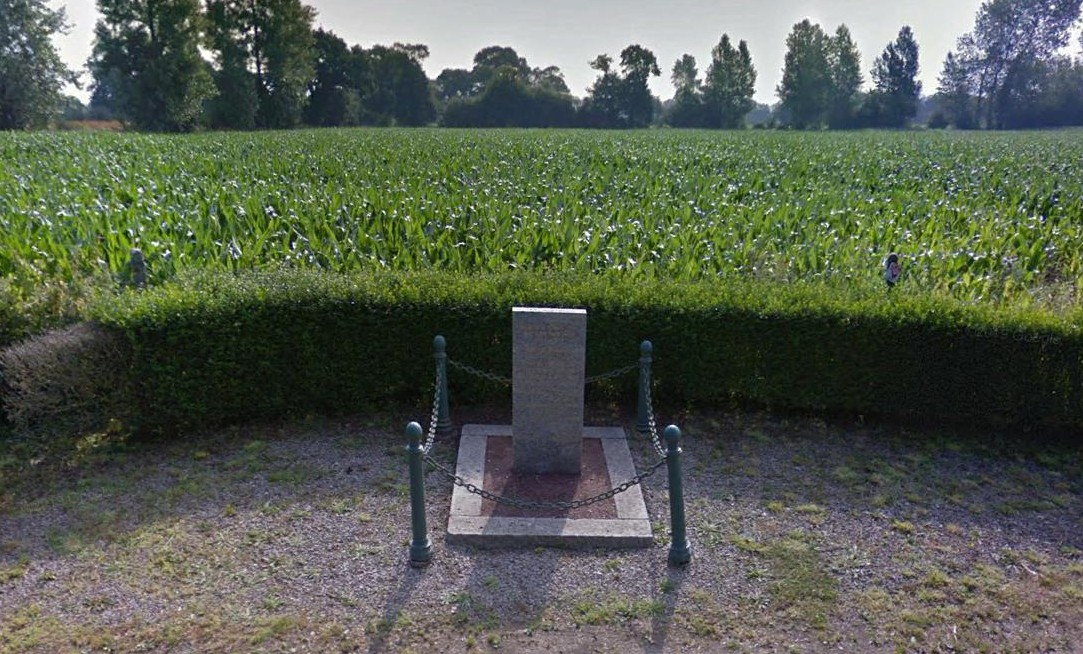
Roadside marker on D69 at the site of the airfield near Picauville

After the Americans and British moved east into Central France with the advancing Allied Armies, the airfield was left un-garrisoned and used for resupply and casualty evacuation. It was closed on 15 September 1944 and the land returned to agricultural use.

== Major units assigned ==
- 405th Fighter Group 30 June - 14 September

509th (G9), 510th (2Z), 511th (K4) Fighter Squadrons (P-47D)

- 264 and 604 squadrons (RAF), 6 and 11 August - 7 September 1944

== Current use ==
Today the airfield is a mixture of various agricultural fields. A memorial to the men and units that were stationed at Picauville was placed at the site of the former airfield. It is located by the Holy Mother Church. Take the D 15 towards Saint Sauveur le Vicomte. Arriving at Picauville, turn right onto the D 69 towards Gourbesville. The monument is about 1 km on the right.

== See also ==
- Advanced Landing Ground
