= Kitzingen Army Airfield =

United States Army airfield in Germany

Harvey Barracks/Kitzingen Army Airfield Advanced Landing Ground (ALG) R-6
- Bavaria, Germany Kitzingen Army Airfield (Germany)

Site information
- Type: Military Garrison (Closed)

Location
- Coordinates: 49°44′34″N 010°12′09″E

Site history
- Built: 1917
- Built by: Luftstreitkräfte (Imperial German Air Force)
- In use: 1917–1918 (Luftstreitkräfte); 1935–1945 (Luftwaffe); April 1945 – July 1947 (USAAF); August 1947 – 2007 (United States Army)

For the civil airport use of this facility after 2007, see: Kitzingen Airport

Harvey Barracks/Kitzingen Army Airfield is a former United States Army 3rd Infantry Division (3rd ID) facility in Germany, located about 3,5 km east-northeast of Kitzingen (Bavaria), about 390 km southwest of Berlin and 202 km north-northwest of Munich.

Formerly part of the United States Army Würzburg military community, it was a 1st ID garrison since 1996 and prior to that it was home to 3rd ID 2nd Brigade. Originally built in 1917, the installation served as a training school for German pilots in World War I. The German Luftwaffe used the base a generation later to train the pilots of dive bombers and pursuit planes during World War II. The Americans took control in April 1945 and used it as an air base until being turned over to the 1st ID in 1947.

It was closed on 29 March 2007 and turned over to the German Government as part of a USAREUR restructuring announced in 2005 which returns the 1st ID to the United States.

== History ==
The airfield has its origins in World War I when it served as a training school for Imperial German Air Force (Luftstreitkräfte) pilots. After the armistice treaty between the Allies and Germany in November 1918, the land was returned to farmers.

Beginning in 1933, the land again was used as an airfield, although under the terms of the Treaty of Versailles Germany was forbidden to have an air force, buildings and hangars were built around a grass airfield and the airfield was used as a flight training school, ostensibly for civilian Deutsche Luft Hansa airline pilots.

=== Luftwaffe use ===
When the new German Air Force (Luftwaffe) was announced in 1935, the training school became a military flight school to train military pilots for bomber and pursuit squadrons. Beginning in April 1936, Sturzkampfgeschwader 165 was activated at Fliegerhorst Kitzingen,

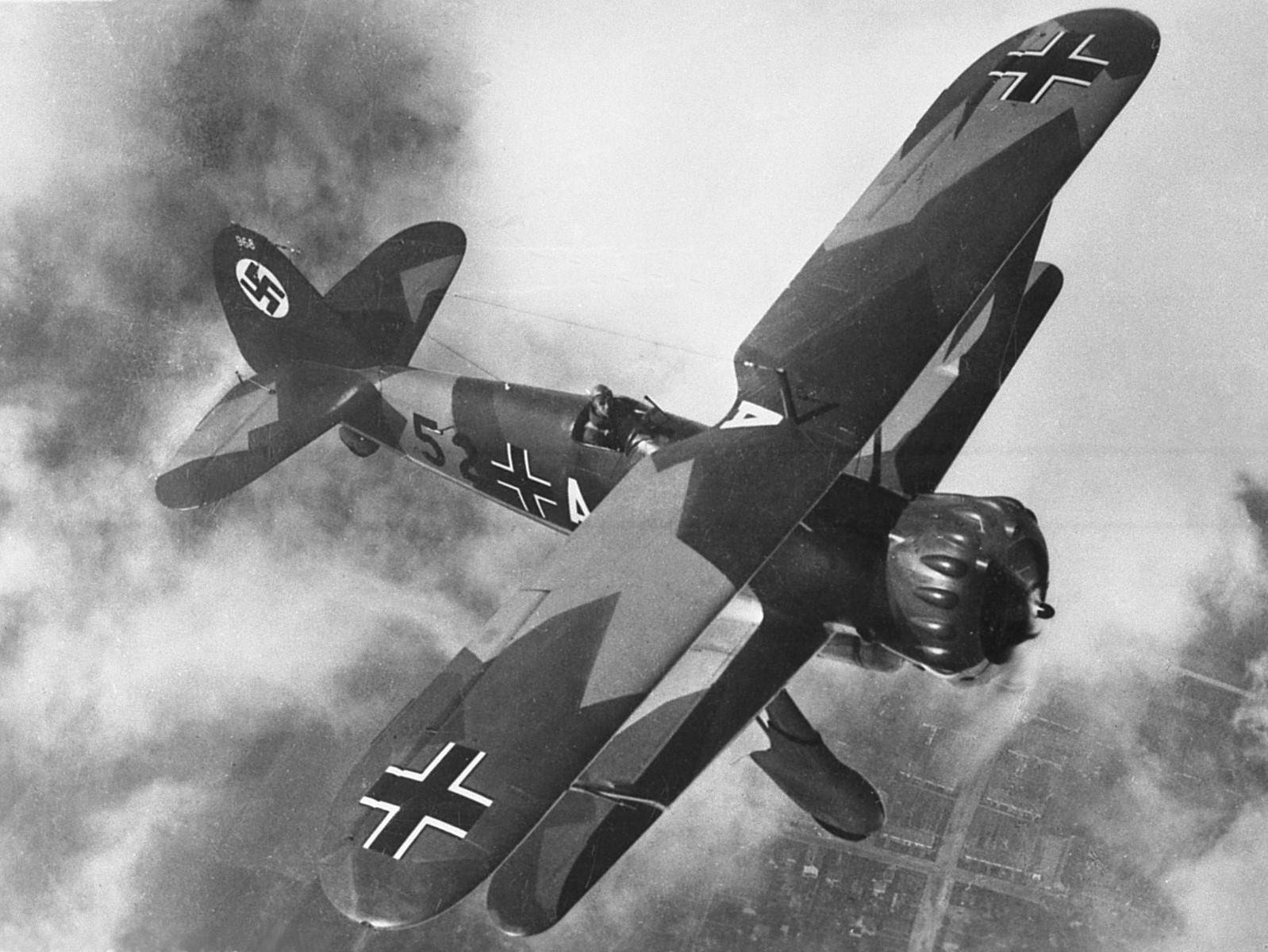
Henschel Hs 123 A, 3rd Squadron, 165th Stuka Wing, Kitzingen ca 1937

and in 1939, Sturzkampffliegerschule Kitzingen as training organizations, primarily for Junkers Ju 87A "Stuka" dive bomber; Junkers Ju 88 fighter-bomber and Dornier Do 17 light bomber pilots. Beginning in 1943, Night Fighter training was performed by Nachtjagdschule 1, using RADAR-equipped Messerschmitt Bf 110; Dornier Do 215, and Dornier Do 217 aircraft in support of the Defense of the Reich campaign.

As a result of the Western Allied invasion of Germany beginning in March, 1945, Kitzingen became an operational combat airfield when elements of Kampfgeschwader (Jagd) 54 (KG (J) 54) arrived, flying the new Messerschmitt Me 262A jet interceptor fighter. The jet operations drew a significant amount of attention from Allied air forces, and as a result the United States Army Air Forces (USAAF) Eighth Air Force flew several Boeing B-17 Flying Fortress heavy bomber attacks on the airfield, and Ninth Air Force Martin B-26 Marauder medium bomber attacks, along with fighter sweeps by Republic P-47 Thunderbolts, to keep the German jets on the ground and limit their effectiveness.

The Luftwaffe abandoned Fliegerhorst Kitzingen about 11 April 1945, blowing up the runway, aircraft hangars and other technical buildings.

=== USAAF use ===
The airfield was seized by Allied ground forces in early April 1945, with the USAAF IX Engineering Command 819th Engineering Aviation Brigade moving in to clear mines; remove destroyed Luftwaffe aircraft and bring the airfield to an operational state for use by American aircraft. The airfield was declared operational on 15 April 1945, designated as Advanced Landing Ground "R-6 Kitzingen". It was immediately put to use as a resupply and casualty evacuation airfield, with C-47 Skytrain transports moving in and out frequently with ammunition and other supplies; evacuating combat wounded back to the rear area. The Ninth Air Force 405th Fighter Group was able to move in with P-47 Thunderbolts on 30 April, but the combat use of Kitzingen was brief, as the collapse of German resistance was in progress, and the war in Europe ending on 7 May.

German Prisoners of War were housed at the airfield, and put to work repairing the heavily damaged facilities; clearing the wreckage, and restoring services to the surrounding area, damaged by the bombing of the area in March and early April. The airfield became an occupation garrison by the Air Force, being designated as Army Air Force Station Kitzingen. The airfield was turned over to Air Technical Service Command, becoming the home of various engineering units, and the 10th Reconnaissance Group, which used Kitzingen as a base of operations, flying mapping and damage assessment photo-recon flights from the airfield during late 1945 and most of 1946.

=== United States Army use ===
The Air Force units moved out at the end of July 1947 and Army units moved in, using the facility as an occupation garrison. Beginning in 1949, with the formation of NATO and the establishment of the Federal Republic of Germany, American army units remained in Kitzingen though a Status of Forces Agreement. On 2 April 1951, Harvey Barracks obtained its name in honor of Captain James R. Harvey, Company E, 359th Infantry, who was killed during the invasion of Normandy, France. For his actions of extraordinary heroism, he was awarded the Distinguished Service Cross posthumously.

Various 3rd Infantry Division units have used Kitzingen Army Airfield/Harvey Barracks during the years of the Cold War, however major flight operations from the airfield ended in 1981 with the departure of the 3rd Combat Aviation Battalion to Giebelstadt AAF.

The airfield only sporadically housed flying units during training exercises after 1981, being renamed Kitzingen Army Airfield Heliport. In August 2005 it was announced that the 1st Infantry Division was returning to the United States as part of a USAREUR restructuring, and that Harvey Barracks would be inactivating. The facility wound down operations over the next 24 months and was closed on 29 March 2007.

=== Civilian use ===
The area was sold by the Federal Republic of Germany to a private investor in 2013. It is developed as a commercial area since then. The Area is named conneKT now.

== See also ==
- Advanced Landing Ground
- German (Bavarian) National map M=1:25.000 (Flugplatz) Iphofen 6227 (1956 and current)
