= List of United States Air Force bomb squadrons =

This is a list of United States Air Force bomb squadrons. It covers all squadrons that were constituted or redesignated as bombardment squadron sometime during their active service. Today bomb squadrons are considered to be part of the Combat Air Force (CAF) along with fighter squadrons. Units in this list are assigned to nearly every Major Command in the United States Air Force. All the active bomb squadrons are in Bold.

== Bomb Squadrons ==
=== Squadrons 1 to 110 ===
Squadron	Shield	Location	Nickname	Aircraft	Note
1st Bombardment Squadron, Medium		Mountain Home AFB		B-47	Redesignated 1st Strategic Reconnaissance Squadron (1966) Redesignated 1st Reconnaissance Squadron (1992) (Active)
2d Bombardment Squadron, Heavy		March AFB		B-52B/C/D/E	Inactivated 1982 / Redesignated 2d Strategic Squadron (RAF Mildenhall) (KC-135's) 1 January 1988 – 31 March 1992
3d Bombardment Squadron (Heavy)		Rio Hato Army Air Base		B-24	Redesignated 129th Strategic Reconnaissance Squadron (Medium, Photographic) (1951)
4th Bombardment Squadron (Heavy)		RAF Mendlesham		B-24	Inactivated 1945
5th Bombardment Squadron, Medium		Mountain Home AFB	"Blackcats"	B-47	Redesignated 5th Strategic Reconnaissance Training Squadron (1966)
6th Bombardment Squadron, Very Heavy		North Field	"XTNDRs"	B-29	Consolidated 19 September 1985 with the 6th Air Refueling Squadron
6th Bombardment Squadron, Heavy		Clinton-Sherman Air Force Base		B-52D	Redesignated from the 6th Strategic Reconnaissance Squadron, Medium (RB47's)
7th Bombardment Squadron (Heavy)		RAF Mendlesham		B-24	Inactivated 1945
8th Bombardment Squadron, Tactical		Phan Rang Air Base, South Vietnam	"Blackbirds"	B-57	Redesignated 8th Attack Squadron (1969)
**9th Bomb Squadron**		Dyess AFB	"Bats"	B-1B	
10th Bombardment Squadron, Medium		Dyess AFB	"Ace in the Hole"	B-47 Stratojet	Redesignated 10th Strategic Missile Squadron
**11th Bomb Squadron**		Barksdale AFB	"Mr. Jiggs"	B-52	
12th Bombardment Squadron, Medium		Dyess AFB	"Red Dawgs"	B-47 Stratojet	Redesignated 12th Strategic Missile Squadron
**13th Bomb Squadron**		Whiteman AFB	"Grim Reapers"	B-2 Spirit	
14th Bombardment Squadron		Essendon, Australia		B-17 B-24	Inactivated 1946-disbanded 1949
15th Bombardment Squadron (Very Heavy)		Northwest Field, Guam		B-29	Inactivated 1946 & Consolidated with 15th Special Operations Squadron (1985)
16th Bombardment Squadron (Very Heavy)		Northwest Field, Guam		B-29	Inactivated 1946
16th Bombardment Squadron (Light)		Sicily	"Fireballs"	A-36	Redesignated 522d Fighter-Bomber Squadron (1943)
17th Bombardment Squadron (Very Heavy)		Northwest Field, Guam		B-29	Inactivated 1946
17th Bombardment Squadron (Light)				A-36	Redesignated 523d Fighter-Bomber Squadron (1943)
18th Bombardment Squadron, Heavy		RAF Mendlesham		B-24	Inactivated 1945 & Consolidated with the 18th Special Operations Squadron (1985)
19th Bombardment Squadron, Medium		March AFB		B-47	Inactivated 1963 & Consolidated with the 19th Air Commando Squadron, Troop Carrier (1985)
**20th Bomb Squadron**		Barksdale AFB	"Buccaneers"	B-52	
21st Bombardment Squadron (Heavy)		Smoky Hill AAF		B-24	Disbanded 1943
21st Bombardment Squadron (Very Heavy)		Northwest Field, Guam		B-29	Inactivated 1946
22d Bombardment Squadron, Medium			"Bombing Bulldogs"	B-25	Inactivated 1945 Consolidated 19 September 1985 with the 22d Air Refueling Squadron
**23d Bomb Squadron**		Minot AFB	"Bomber Barons"	B-52	
24th Bombardment Squadron (Light)		Eglin Field	"Golden Jaguars"	B-25	Disbanded 1942
24th Bombardment Squadron, Heavy		Walker AFB		B-52	Redesignated 24th Strategic Reconnaissance Squadron on 25 June 1967 (Eielson AFB, Alaska) (RC-135D/E/S)
24th Bombardment Squadron, Medium		Lake Charles AFB		B-29	Redesignated 24th Strategic Reconnaissance Squadron, Medium (1952)
25th Bombardment Squadron, Medium		Forbes AFB	"Executioners"	B-47	Redesignated 25th Strategic Training Squadron (1988)
26th Bombardment Squadron, Heavy		Altus AFB		B-52	Redesignated 26th Tactical Fighter Squadron (1973)
27th Bombardment Squadron, Heavy		Kwajalein		B-24	Inactivated 1946
**28th Bomb Squadron**		Dyess AFB	"Mohawk Warriors"	B-1B	
29th Bombardment Squadron, Heavy		Fairchild AFB	"Antique Airlines" (1966-1973) "Thumper"	RB-29 Superfortress	Redesignated 130th Strategic Reconnaissance Squadron, Medium, Photographic (1951)
30th Bombardment Squadron		Grand Forks AFB		B-52	Inactivated 1963 & Consolidated 19 September 1985 with the USAF Air Demonstration Squadron (Thunderbirds)
31st Bombardment Squadron (Medium)		Beale AFB		B-52	Redesignated 31st Test and Evaluation Squadron (1986)
32d Bombardment Squadron (Medium)		Lockbourne Air Force Base		EB-47	Redesignated 32d Air Refueling Squadron, Heavy (1964)
33d Bombardment Squadron, Medium				B-24	Redesignated 33d Flying Training Squadron (1990)
**34th Bomb Squadron**		Ellsworth AFB	"Thunderbirds"	B-1B	
35th Bombardment Squadron (Light)		Phillips Field, MD		B-25	Inactivated 1949
36th Bombardment Squadron (Provisional)		RAF Harrington		B-24	Consolidated with 856th Bombardment Squadron, Heavy (1944)
36th Bombardment Squadron (Heavy)		RAF Alconbury		B-24	Inactivated 1945
**37th Bomb Squadron**		Ellsworth AFB	"Tigers"	B-1B	
38th Bombardment Squadron, Heavy		Kwajalein		B-24	Inactivated 1946
39th Bombardment Squadron (Medium)		Dover AAF		B-25	Redesignated 3d Antisubmarine Squadron (Heavy) (1942), then 819th Bombardment Squadron, Heavy (1943)
39th Bombardment Squadron, Heavy		Walker AFB		B-52	Redesignated 9th Air Commando Squadron (Psychological Operations) (1967)
40th Bombardment Squadron		Podington England		B-24	Inactivated 1943 (Not Related to 40 BS (Heavy))
40th Bombardment Squadron, Heavy		Walker AFB		B-52	Inactivated 1967 (Not Related to 40 BS )
41st Bombardment Squadron, Very Heavy		Long Beach Mun Airport		B-29	Inactivated 1949 Consolidated 19 September 1985 with the 41st Air Refueling Squadron (KC-135)
42d Bombardment Squadron, Heavy		Wright-Patterson AFB		B-52	Redesignated 42d Attack Squadron (2006)
43d Bombardment Squadron, Very Heavy		North Field, Guam		B-29	Inactivated 1946
44th Bombardment Squadron		Forbes AFB		B-47	Inactivated 1964
45th Bombardment Squadron		Forbes AFB		B-47	Inactivated 1964
46th Bomb Squadron		Grand Forks AFB		B-1B	Inactivated 1994
47th Bombardment Squadron, Medium		Manila, Philippines		B-25	Inactivated 1946
48th Bombardment Squadron, Medium		Manila, Philippines		B-25	Inactivated 1946
49th Bombardment Squadron, Medium		Hunter Air Force Base	"Wolves"	B-47	Redesignated 49th Test Squadron (1986)
50th Bombardment Squadron, Light		Birmingham Municipal Airport, AL		B-25	Redesignated 50th Fighter-Bomber Squadron (1957)
51st Bombardment Squadron, Medium		Lake Charles AFB, LA		B-47	Redesignated from 51st Strategic Reconnaissance Squadron (1952) Redesignated (1963)
51st Bombardment Squadron, Heavy		Seymour Johnson AFB		B-52G	Redesignated (1963) Inactivated (1982)
52d Bombardment Squadron, Medium		Lake Charles AFB, LA		B-47	Redesignated from 52d Strategic Reconnaissance Squadron (1952) Inactivated (1963)
52d Bombardment Squadron, Very Heavy		North Field		B-29	Redesignated 52d Flying Training Squadron (1972)
53d Bombardment Squadron (Light)				A-20, B-25	Disbanded 1944
54th Bombardment Squadron (Medium)				B-25	Disbanded 1942
55th Bombardment Squadron (Dive)		Key Field, MS		A-35	Redesignated 492d Fighter Squadron (1943)
56th Bombardment Squadron (Dive)		Key Field, MS		A-35	Redesignated 493d Fighter Squadron (1943)
57th Bombardment Squadron (Dive)		Key Field, MS		A-35	Redesignated 494th Fighter Squadron (1943)
58th Bombardment Squadron (Dive)				A-20	Redesignated 531st Fighter Squadron (1943)
59th Bombardment Squadron (Light)		Birmingham Municipal Airport		B-25	Inactivated 1951
60th Bombardment Squadron, Heavy		Andersen AFB		B-52D / B-52G	Inactivated 1990
60th Bombardment Squadron, Very Heavy		North Field, Guam		B-29	Consolidated with 960th Airborne Early Warning & Control Squadron (1985)
61st Bombardment Squadron, Very Heavy		North Field, Guam		B-29	Consolidated with 961st Airborne Early Warning & Control Squadron (1985)
62d Bombardment Squadron		Barksdale AFB		B-52G	Inactivated 1993
63d Bombardment Squadron (Medium)		Little Rock AFB		B-58	Inactivated 1970
63d Bombardment Squadron (Provisional)		Andersen AFB		B-52	Inactivated 1975
64th Bombardment Squadron (Medium)		Little Rock AFB		B-58	Inactivated 1970
64th Bombardment Squadron (Provisional)		Andersen AFB		B-52	Inactivated 1973
65th Bombardment Squadron (Medium)		Little Rock AFB		B-58	Inactivated 1970 – Redesignated:65th Strategic Squadron Andersen AFB, Guam (KC-135)
65th Bombardment Squadron (Provisional)		Andersen AFB		B-52	Inactivated 1973
66th Bombardment Squadron, Medium		Lake Charles AFB, LA		B-47	Redesignated 66th Strategic Missile Squadron (1962)
67th Bombardment Squadron, Medium		Lake Charles AFB, LA		B-47	Redesignated 67th Strategic Missile Squadron (1962)
68th Bombardment Squadron, Medium		Lake Charles AFB, LA		B-47	Redesignated 68th Strategic Missile Squadron (1962)
**69th Bomb Squadron**		Minot AFB		B-52H	
70th Bombardment Squadron, Heavy		Loring AFB		B-52G	Redesignated 70th Flying Training Squadron (1966)
71st Bombardment Squadron, Tactical		Laon-Couvron Air Base, France		B-57	Redesignated 71st Tactical Missile Squadron (1958)
72d Bomb Squadron		Minot Air Force Base		B-52H	Redesignated 72d Test and Evaluation Squadron (1998)
73d Bombardment Squadron (Medium)		Pyote AAF		B-25, B-26	Disbanded 1943
73d Bombardment Squadron, Heavy		Seymour Johnson AFB		B-52G	Inactivated 1963
74th Bombardment Squadron		March AFB		B-29	Inactivated 1952
75th Bombardment Squadron, Heavy		Griffiss AFB		B-52C/D/G	Inactivated 1963
76th Bombardment Squadron (Medium)		McChord Field		B-25	Redesignated 23d Antisubmarine Squadron (Heavy) (1943)
77th Bomb Squadron		Ellsworth Air Force Base		B-1B	Redesignated 77th Weapons Squadron (2003)
78th Bombardment Squadron (Light)		Langley Field		A-20	Redesignated 7th Antisubmarine Squadron (1942) then 851st Bombardment Squadron (Heavy) (1943)
79th Bombardment Squadron (Light)		Cherry Point		A-20	Redesignated 8th Antisubmarine Squadron (1942) then 839th Bombardment Squadron (Heavy) (1943)
80th Bombardment Squadron (Light)		Dover AAF		A-20	Redesignated 9th Antisubmarine Squadron (1942) then 835th Bombardment Squadron (1943)
81st Bombardment Squadron, Light		Langley Field		B-25	Redesignated 559th Fighter-Escort Squadron (1950)
82d Bombardment Squadron, Light		Langley Field		B-25	Redesignated 560th Fighter-Escort Squadron (1950)
83d Bombardment Squadron, Light		Langley Field		B-25	Redesignated 561st Fighter-Escort Squadron (1950)
84th Bombardment Squadron, Tactical		RAF Sculthorpe		B-66	Inactivated 1962
85th Bombardment Squadron, Tactical		RAF Sculthorpe		B-66	Redesignated 85th Flying Training Squadron (1972)
86th Bombardment Squadron, Tactical		RAF Sculthorpe		B-66	Redesignated 86th Flying Training Squadron (1972)
87th Bombardment Squadron (Medium)		Drew Field, FL		B-25	Disbanded 1944
88th Bombardment Squadron (Dive)		Key Field, MS		A-35	Redesignated 495th Fighter Squadron (1943)
89th Bombardment Squadron, Light		Itami Air Base		B-26	Redesignated 89th Tactical Missile Squadron (1962)
90th Bombardment Squadron, Tactical		Yokota Air Base		B-57	Redesignated 90th Tactical Fighter Squadron (1964)
91st Bombardment Squadron (Light)		Gela, Sicily		A-36	Redesignated 524th Fighter-Bomber Squadron (1943)
92d Bombardment Squadron (Light)		Manchester Airfield		unknown	Redesignated 92d Reconnaissance Squadron (Medium) (1941)
**93d Bomb Squadron**		Barksdale AFB	"Indian Outlaws"	B-52H	
94th Bombardment Squadron (Light)		McChord Field, WA		B-18	Redesignated 94th Reconnaissance Squadron (Medium) (1941)
95th Bombardment Squadron, Tactical		Hurlburt Field, FL		B-66	Redesignated 95th Reconnaissance Squadron (1982)
**96th Bomb Squadron**		Barksdale AFB	"Red Devils"	B-52H	
97th Bomb Squadron			"Venit Hora"		Redesignated 97th Air Refueling Squadron (1949)
98th Bombardment Squadron		Clinton-Sherman AFB		B-52E	Inactivated 1963
99th Bombardment Squadron, Medium		Mountain Home AFB		B-47	Redesignated 99th Strategic Reconnaissance Squadron (1966)
100th Aero Squadron		Ourches Areodrome		Airco DH.4	Inactivated 1919
100th Bombardment Squadron, Medium		Sansapor New Guinea		B-25	Redesignated 106th Bombardment Squadron, Light (1946)
110th Bomb Squadron		Whiteman AFB	"Lindbergh's Own"	B-2 Spirit	Formerly 110th Fighter Squadron

=== Squadrons 300 to 399 ===
Squadron	Shield	Location	Nickname	Aircraft	Note
301st Bombardment Squadron (Dive)		Drew Field		A-24	Redesignated 496th Fighter-Bomber Squadron (1943)
301st Bombardment Squadron		Eglin AFB		B-52G	Inactivated 1963
302d Bombardment Squadron (Dive)		Drew Field		A-24	Redesignated 497th Fighter-Bomber Squadron (1943)
303d Bombardment Squadron (Dive)		Drew Field		A-24	Redesignated 498th Fighter-Bomber Squadron (1943)
304th Bombardment Squadron (Dive)		Drew Field		A-24	Redesignated 491st Fighter-Bomber Squadron (1943)
305th Bombardment Squadron (Dive)		Harding AAF		A-36	Redesignated 499th Fighter-Bomber Squadron (1943)
306th Bombardment Squadron (Dive)		Harding AAF		A-36	Redesignated 500th Fighter-Bomber Squadron (1943)
307th Bombardment Squadron (Dive)		Harding AAF		A-36	Redesignated 501st Fighter-Bomber Squadron (1943)
308th Bombardment Squadron (Dive)		Harding AAF		A-36	Redesignated 502d Fighter-Bomber Squadron (1943)
309th Bombardment Squadron (Dive)		Hunter Field, GA		A-36	Redesignated 525th Fighter-Bomber Squadron (1943)
310th Bombardment Squadron (Dive)		Hunter Field, GA		A-36	Redesignated 526th Fighter-Bomber Squadron (1943)
311th Bombardment Squadron (Dive)		Gela, Sicily		A-36	Disbanded 1943
312th Bombardment Squadron (Dive)				A-24	Redesignated 527th Fighter-Bomber Squadron (1943)
313th Bombardment Squadron (Medium)		MacDill Field		B-26 Marauder	Redesignated 13th Tactical Fighter Squadron (1966)
314th Bombardment Squadron (Medium)		MacDill Field		B-26 Marauder	Disbanded 1943
315th Bombardment Squadron (Medium)		MacDill Field		B-26 Marauder	Disbanded 1943
316th Bombardment Squadron (Heavy)		Avon Park Army Air Field		B-17	Inactivated 1944
317th Bombardment Squadron (Heavy)		Avon Park Army Air Field		B-17	Inactivated 1944
318th Bombardment Squadron (Heavy)		Avon Park Army Air Field		B-17	Inactivated 1944
319th Bombardment Squadron, Medium		Fairchild AFB		B-29	Redesignated 319th Strategic Reconnaissance Squadron, Medium (1952)
320th Bombardment Squadron, Medium		Fairchild AFB		B-29	Redesignated 320th Strategic Reconnaissance Squadron, Medium (1952)
321st Bombardment Squadron, Medium		Fairchild AFB		B-29	Redesignated 321st Strategic Reconnaissance Squadron, Medium (1952)
322d Bombardment Squadron, Heavy		Glasgow AFB		B-52C/D	Inactivated 1968
323d Bombardment Squadron (Heavy)		RAF Bassingbourn		B-17	Redesignated 323d Reconnaissance Squadron (1947)
324th Bombardment Squadron (Heavy)		RAF Bassingbourn		B-17	Redesignated 324th Reconnaissance Squadron (1947)
325th Bomb Squadron		Fairchild AFB	"Alley Oop"	B-52H	Redesignated 325th Weapons Squadron (2003)
326th Bombardment Squadron, Heavy		Glasgow AFB		B-52D	Inactivated 1963
327th Bombardment Squadron, Heavy		Larson AFB		B-52D	Inactivated 1963
328th Bomb Squadron		Castle AFB		B-52G	Redesignated 329th Weapons Squadron (2003)
329th Bombardment Squadron (Heavy)		Castle AFB		B-52	Redesignated 329th Strategic Bombardment Training (19??)
329th Bomb Squadron (Provisional)		Andersen AFB		B-52G	Inactivated 1973
330th Bombardment Squadron (Heavy)		Castle AFB		B-52	Redesignated 330th Combat Flight Instructor (19??)
331st Bombardment Squadron, Tactical		Dobbins AFB		B-26	Redesignated 731st Troop Carrier Squadron, Medium (1957)
332d Bombardment Squadron, Heavy		Dobbins AFB		B-26	Redesignated 332d Tactical Reconnaissance Squadron (1952)
333d Bombardment Squadron, Heavy		RAF Bury St Edmunds		B-17	Redesignated 333d Tactical Reconnaissance Squadron (1952)
334th Bombardment Squadron, Heavy		Biggs AFB		B-52B	Inactivated 1966
335th Bombardment Squadron, Heavy		Bergstrom AFB		B-52D	Inactivated 1965
336th Bombardment Squadron, Heavy		Turner AFB		B-52D	Inactivated 1963
337th Bomb Squadron		Dyess AFB		B-1B	Inactivated 1994 & Redesignated 337th Test and Evaluation Squadron (2004)
338th Bombardment Squadron, Medium		Dyess AFB		B-47	Inactivated 1963 & Redesignated 338th Combat Crew Training Squadron (1985)
339th Bombardment Squadron, Medium		Dyess AFB		B-47	Inactivated 1963
340th Bomb Squadron		Eaker AFB		B-52G	Inactivated 1992 & Redesignated 340th Weapons Squadron (2003)
341st Bombardment Squadron, Heavy		Dow AFB		B-52	Inactivated 19
342d Bombardment Squadron, Heavy		Robins AFB		B-52	Inactivated 19
**343d Bomb Squadron**		Barksdale AFB		B-52	
344th Bombardment Squadron, Medium		Lincoln AFB		B-47	Redesignated 344th Air Refueling Squadron, Heavy (1986)
345th Bombardment Squadron, Very Heavy		MacDill Field		B-29	Inactivated 1946
346th Bombardment Squadron, Heavy		Westover AFB		B-52D	Inactivated 1972 & Redesignated 346th Test and Evaluation Squadron B-1/B-52H (1992–1995)
347th Bombardment Squadron, Heavy		McCoy AFB		B-52D	Inactivated 1963
348th Bombardment Squadron, Heavy		Westover AFB		B-52D	Inactivated 1973
349th Bombardment Squadron, Medium		Pease AFB		B-47	Redesignated 349th Strategic Reconnaissance Squadron (1966)
350th Bombardment Squadron, Medium		Pease AFB		B-47	Redesignated 350th Strategic Reconnaissance Squadron (1966)
351st Bombardment Squadron, Medium		Pease AFB		B-47	Redesignated 351st Air Refueling Squadron (1992)
352d Bombardment Squadron, Medium		Lockbourne AFB		B-47	Inactivated 1964
353d Bombardment Squadron, Medium		Lockbourne AFB		B-47	Inactivated 1964
354th Bombardment Squadron (Heavy)		Geiger Field		B-17	Inactivated 1942
355th Bombardment Squadron, Very Heavy		Northwest Field		B-29	Inactivated 1946
356th Bombardment Squadron, Very Heavy		Northwest Field		B-29	Redesignated 356th Troop Carrier Squadron, Medium (1949)
357th Bombardment Squadron, Very Heavy		Northwest Field		B-29	Redesignated 357th Troop Carrier Squadron, Medium (1952)
358th Bombardment Squadron, Medium		Davis Monthan AFB		B-47	Inactivated 1964
359th Bombardment Squadron, Medium		Davis Monthan AFB		B-47	Inactivated 1964
360th Bombardment Squadron, Medium		Davis Monthan AFB		B-47	Inactivated 1964
361st Bombardment Squadron		Port Lyautey		B-24	Redesignated 1st Antisubmarine Squadron (Heavy) (1942)
362d Bombardment Squadron (Heavy)		Port Lyautey		B-24	Redesignated 18th Antisubmarine Squadron (Heavy) (1942)
363d Bombardment Squadron		RAF Padington		B-17;B-24	Redesignated 19th Antisubmarine Squadron (Heavy) (1942)
364th Bombardment Squadron, Medium		Bunker Hill AFB		B-58	Inactivated 1970
364th Bombardment Squadron (Provisional)		U-Tapao AB		B-52	Inactivated 1975
365th Bombardment Squadron, Medium		Bunker Hill AFB		B-58	Inactivated 1970
365th Bombardment Squadron (Provisional)		U-Tapao AB		B-52	Inactivated 1974
366th Bombardment Squadron, Medium		Bunker Hill AFB		B-58	Inactivated 1970
367th Bombardment Squadron, Heavy		McCoy AFB		B-52C/D	Inactivated 1974
368th Bombardment Squadron, Medium		MacDill AFB		B-47	Inactivated 1963
369th Bombardment Squadron, Medium		MacDill AFB		B-47	Inactivated 1963
370th Bombardment Squadron, Medium		Lincoln AFB		B-47	Redesignated 370th Flight Test Squadron (2001)
371st Bombardment Squadron, Medium		Lincoln AFB		B-47	Inactivated 1965
372d Bombardment Squadron, Medium		Lincoln AFB		B-47	Inactivated 1965
373d Bombardment Squadron, Medium		Plattsburgh AFB		B-47	Redesignated 373d Strategic Missile Squadron (1961)
374th Bombardment Squadron, Medium		Plattsburgh AFB		B-47	Redesignated 374th Strategic Missile Squadron (1961)
375th Bombardment Squadron, Medium		Plattsburgh AFB		B-47	Inactivated 1961
376th Bombardment Squadron (Medium)		Columbia AAB		B-25	Redesignated 376th Troop Carrier Squadron (Medium) (1949)
377th Bombardment Squadron (Medium)		Columbia AAB		B-25	Redesignated 377th Troop Carrier Squadron (Medium) (1949)
378th Bombardment Squadron (Medium)		Columbia AAB		B-25	Redesignated 378th Troop Carrier Squadron (Assault, Fixed Wing) (1955)
379th Bombardment Squadron, Medium		Schilling AFB		B-47	Inactivated 1965
380th Bombardment Squadron, Medium		Schilling AFB		B-47	Inactivated 1965, Redesignated 380th Space Control Squadron (2008)
381st Bombardment Squadron, Medium		Schilling AFB		B-47	Inactivated 1965
382d Bombardment Squadron (Dive)		Waycross AAF		A-36	Redesignated 528th Fighter-Bomber Squadron (1943)
383d Bombardment Squadron (Dive)		Waycross AAF		A-36	Redesignated 529th Fighter-Bomber Squadron (1943)
384th Bombardment Squadron (Dive)		Waycross AAF		A-36	Redesignated 530th Fighter-Bomber Squadron (1943)
385th Bombardment Squadron (Dive)		Waycross AAF		A-36	Disbanded 1943
386th Bombardment Squadron, Very Heavy		Ellington Field		B-32	Redesignated 386th Fighter-Bomber Squadron (1954)
387th Bombardment Squadron, Very Heavy		Ellington Field		A-20	Redesignated 387th Fighter-Bomber Squadron (1954)
388th Bombardment Squadron, Very Heavy		Ellington Field		A-20	Redesignated 388th Fighter-Bomber Squadron (1954)
389th Bombardment Squadron, Very Heavy		Ellington Field		A-20	Inactivated 1949
390th Bombardment Squadron, Medium		Russell Islands		B-25	Inactivated 1946
391st Bombardment Squadron, Heavy		RAF Mendlesham		B-24	Inactivated 1945 & Consolidated with 91st Air Refueling Squadron, Medium (1985)
392d Bombardment Squadron, Heavy		Saipan		B-24	
**393d Bomb Squadron**		Whiteman AFB	"Tigers"	B-2A	
394th Bombardment Squadron, Heavy		Guadalcanal		B-24	Redesignated 394th Combat Training Squadron (1996)
395th Bombardment Squadron, Very Heavy		Chakulia, India		B-29	Inactivated 1944
396th Bombardment Squadron, Medium		Yontan Airfield, Okinawa		B-25	Consolidated 19 September 1985 with the 96th Air Refueling Squadron; Inactivated 2005
397th Bombardment Squadron, Heavy		Rio Hato, Panama		B-24	Inactivated 1946
398th Bombardment Squadron, Very Heavy		North Field, Tinian		B-29	Inactivated 1945
399th Bombardment Squadron, Heavy		Avon Park AAF		B-17	Inactivated 1944; Consolidated with 99th Air Refueling Squadron, Heavy (1985)

=== Squadrons 400 to 499 ===
Squadron	Shield	Location	Nickname	Aircraft	Note
400th Bombardment Squadron, Heavy		Fort William McKinley		B-24	Redesignated 400th Strategic Missile Squadron (ICBM-Minuteman) (1963)
401st Bombardment Squadron (Heavy)		RAF Bassingbourn		B-17	Inactivated 1945
402d Bombardment Squadron, Very Heavy		Northwest Field, Guam		B-29	Inactivated 1946
403d Bombardment Squadron, Medium		Carswell AFB		B-58	Inactivated 1961
404th Bombardment Squadron, Heavy		Shemya Army Air Base		B-24	Inactivated 1947
405th Bombardment Squadron, Tactical		Laon-Couvron Air Base, France		B-57	Redesignated 405th Tactical Missile Squadron (1958)
406th Bombardment Squadron, Very Heavy		RAF Harrington,		B-17, B-24	Redesignated 906th Air Refueling Squadron, Heavy (1959)
406th Bombardment Squadron (Provisional)		RAF Harrington		B-24	Inactivated 1945
407th Bombardment Squadron					
408th Bombardment Squadron, Medium		March AFB		B-47	Inactivated 1962
409th Bombardment Squadron, Very Heavy		Davis-Monthan Field		B-29	Consolidated 19 September 1985 with the 909th Air Refueling Squadron (1963)
410th Bombardment Squadron, Heavy		RAF Bury St Edmunds		B-17	Inactivated 19
411th Bombardment Squadron, Very Heavy		Northwest Field, Guam		B-29	Consolidated with 911th Air Refueling Squadron, Heavy (1985)
412th Bombardment Squadron, Very Heavy		Knoxville Municipal Airport		B-29	Consolidated with 912th Air Refueling Squadron, Heavy (1985)
413th Bombardment Squadron		Dyess AFB		B-47	Consolidated with 6513th Test Squadron and redesignated 413th Test Squadron (1992)
414th Bombardment Squadron, Heavy		Amendola, Italy		B-17	Inactivated 1945; Redesignated 414th Expeditionary Reconnaissance Squadron (2011)
415th Bombardment Squadron, Medium		Lincoln AFB		B-47	Consolidated with 6515th Test Squadron and redesignated 415th Test Squadron (1992)
416th Bombardment Squadron, Very Heavy		Robins AFB		unknown	Inactivated 1949; Consolidated with 6516th Test Squadron and redesignated 416th Test Squadron (1992)
417th Bombardment Squadron, Medium		Alamogordo AAF		B-25	Inactivated 1944
418th Bombardment Squadron, Medium		Pease AFB		B-47	Consolidated with 6518th Test Squadron and redesignated 418th Test Squadron (1992)
419th Bombardment Squadron, Medium		Lockborne AFB		B-47	Consolidated with 6519th Test Squadron and redesignated 419th Test Squadron (1992)
420th Bombardment Squadron, Very Heavy		Smoky Hill AAF		B-29	Inactivated 1946
421st Bombardment Squadron		Salt Lake City AAB		B-17	Redesignated 20th Antisubmarine Squadron (1942)
421st Bombardment Squadron, Very Heavy		North Field, Tinian		B-29	Inactivated 1945
422d Bombardment Squadron, Medium		Bunker Hill Air Force Base		B-47	Inactivated 1961
423d Bombardment Squadron, Medium		MacDill Air Force Base		B-47	Inactivated 1962
424th Bombardment Squadron, Medium		Lincoln AFB		B-47	Inactivated 1962
425th Bombardment Squadron, Medium		Plattburgh AFB		B-47	Inactivated 1961
426th Bombardment Squadron, Medium		Columbia AAB		B-24	Inactivated 1944
427th Bombardment Squadron, Medium		Davis-Monthan AFB		B-47	Inactivated 1962
428th Bombardment Squadron, Medium		Schilling AFB		B-47	Inactivated 1962
429th Bombardment Squadron, Medium		Hunter AFB		B-47	Inactivated 1962
430th Bombardment Squadron, Very Heavy		Northwest Field, Guam		B-29	Inactivated 1946
431st Bombardment Squadron, Heavy		Kadena Airbase		B-24	Redesignated 5th Reconnaissance Squadron, Very Long Range, Photographic (1946)
432d Bombardment Squadron, Medium		Dijon, France		B-26	Inactivated 1945
433d Bombardment Squadron, Medium		Galveston Airport		B-25	Redesignated 867th Bombardment Squadron (1943)
434th Bombardment Squadron, Medium		Foggia, Italy		B-25	Inactivated 1946
435th Bombardment Squadron, Very Heavy		Kadena Airbase		B-29	Inactivated 1946
436th Bombardment Squadron, Very Heavy		Kadena Airbase		B-29	Redesignated 436th Strategic Training Squadron (1986)
437th Bombardment Squadron, Light		Kadena Airbase		B-25	Redesignated 168th Bombardment Squadron, Light and allocated to the Air National Guard (1946)
438th Bombardment Squadron, Light		Kadena Airbase		B-25	Redesignated 180th Bombardment Squadron, Light and allocated to the Air National Guard (1946)
439th Bombardment Squadron, Light		Kadena Airbase		B-25	Redesignated 114th Bombardment Squadron, Light and allocated to the Air National Guard (1946)
440th Bombardment Squadron, Light		Kadena Airbase		B-25	Redesignated 117th Bombardment Squadron, Light and allocated to the Air National Guard (1946)
441st Bombardment Squadron, Heavy		Mather AFB		B-52G	Inactivated 1989
442d Bombardment Squadron, Medium		March AFB		B-47	Inactivated 1960
443d Bombardment Squadron, Medium		March AFB		B-47	Inactivated 1960
444th Bombardment Squadron, Medium		March AFB		B-47	Inactivated 1960
445th Bombardment Squadron, Medium		McCoy AFB		B-47	Inactivated 1961
446th Bombardment Squadron, Medium		McCoy AFB		B-47	Redesignated 446th Strategic Missile Squadron (1965)
447th Bombardment Squadron, Medium		McCoy AFB		B-47	Redesignated 447th Strategic Missile Squadron (1965)
448th Bombardment Squadron, Medium		McCoy AFB		B-47	Redesignated 448th Strategic Missile Squadron (1965)
449th Bombardment Squadron, Medium		RAF Bury St Edmunds		B-26	Redesignated 449th Flying Training Squadron (1972)
450th Bombardment Squadron, Medium		RAF Bury St Edmunds		B-26	Redesignated 450th Flying Training Squadron (1972)
451st Bombardment Squadron, Medium		RAF Bury St Edmunds		B-26	Redesignated 451st Flying Training Squadron (1972)
452d Bombardment Squadron, Medium		RAF Bury St Edmunds		B-26	Redesignated 452d Flying Training Squadron (1972)
453d Bombardment Squadron, Medium		RAF Beaulieu		B-26	Redesignated 453d Flying Training Squadron (1972)
454th Bombardment Squadron, Medium		RAF Beaulieu		B-26	Redesignated 454th Flying Training Squadron (1972)
455th Bombardment Squadron, Medium		RAF Beaulieu		B-26	Redesignated 455th Flying Training Squadron (1972)
456th Bombardment Squadron, Medium		RAF Beaulieu		B-26	
457th Bombardment Squadron, Very Heavy		March AFB		B-29	Redesignated 457th Troop Carrier Squadron, Medium (1967)
458th Bombardment Squadron, Very Heavy		March AFB		B-29	Redesignated 458th Troop Carrier Squadron, Medium (1962)
459th Bombardment Squadron, Very Heavy		March AFB		B-29	
460th Bombardment Squadron, Very Heavy		North Field, Guam		B-29	Inactivated 1945
461st Bombardment Squadron, Very Heavy		Kadena AB		B-29	Inactivated 1946
462d Bombardment Squadron, Very Heavy		Kadena AB		B-29	Inactivated 1946
463d Bombardment Squadron, Very Heavy		Kadena AB		B-29	Inactivated 1946
464th Bombardment Squadron, Heavy		Casper AAF		B-24	Inactivated 1944
465th Bombardment Squadron, Light		Alachua AAF		A-20	Inactivated 1944
466th Bombardment Squadron (Heavy)		Dalhart AAF		B-17	Redesignated 166th Liaison Squadron (Commando) (1944)
467th Bombardment Squadron (Heavy)		Dalhart AAF		B-17	Inactivated 1944
468th Bombardment Squadron (Heavy)		Dalhart AAF		B-17	Inactivated 1944, Consolidated with 68th Air Refueling Squadron (19 September 1985)
469th Bombardment Squadron (Heavy)		Dalhart AAF		B-24	Inactivated 1944, Consolidated with 469th Tactical Fighter Squadron (19 September 1985)
470th Bombardment Squadron, Medium		Greenville Army Air Base		B-25	Consolidated 19 September 1985 with the 70th Air Refueling Squadron, Medium (1955)
471st Bombardment Squadron (Medium)		Greenville AAB		B-25	Disbanded 1944
472d Bombardment Squadron (Medium)		Greenville AAB		B-25	Disbanded 1944
473d Bombardment Squadron (Medium)		Greenville AAB		B-25	Disbanded 1944
474th Bombardment Squadron (Medium)		Barksdale AAB		B-26 Marauder	Disbanded 1944
475th Bombardment Squadron (Medium)		Barksdale AAB		B-26 Marauder	Disbanded 1944
476th Bombardment Squadron (Medium)		Barksdale AAB		B-26 Marauder	Disbanded 1944
477th Bombardment Squadron (Medium)		Barksdale AAB		B-26 Marauder	Disbanded 1944
478th Bombardment Squadron (Medium)		Avon Park AAF		B-26 Marauder	Disbanded 1944
479th Bombardment Squadron (Medium)		Avon Park AAF		B-26 Marauder	Disbanded 1944
480th Bombardment Squadron (Medium)		Avon Park AAF		B-26 Marauder	Disbanded 1944
481st Bombardment Squadron (Medium)		Avon Park AAF		B-26 Marauder	Disbanded 1944
482d Bombardment Squadron, Very Heavy		North Field, Tinian		B-29	Inactivated 1946
483d Bombardment Squadron, Very Heavy		North Field, Tinian		B-29	Inactivated 1946
484th Bombardment Squadron, Very Heavy		North Field, Tinian		B-29	Inactivated 1946
485th Bombardment Squadron, Very Heavy		Northwest Field, Guam		B-29	Inactivated 1946
486th Bombardment Squadron, Heavy		March AFB		B-52	Inactivated 1966
486th Bomb Squadron (Provisional)		Andersen AFB		B-52	Inactivated 19
487th Bombardment Squadron, Medium		Whiteman AFB		B-47	Inactivated 1963
488th Bombardment Squadron, Medium		Whiteman AFB		B-47	Inactivated 1963
489th Bombardment Squadron, Medium		Whiteman AFB		B-47	Redesignated 489th Reconnaissance Squadron (2011)
490th Bombardment Squadron, Medium		Dyess AFB	"Farsiders"	B-47 Stratojet	Redesignated 490th Strategic Missile Squadron
491st Bombardment Squadron, Medium				B-47	Inactivated 1961
492d Bombardment Squadron, Heavy		Columbus AFB		B-52F	Inactivated 1963
493d Bombardment Squadron, Heavy		Kanchrapara, India		B-24	Consolidated 19 September 1985 with the 93d Air Refueling Squadron (19??)
494th Bombardment Squadron, Medium		RAF Stansted Mountfitchet		B-26	Inactivated 1946
495th Bombardment Squadron, Medium		RAF Stansted Mountfitchet		B-26	Inactivated 1946
496th Bombardment Squadron, Medium		RAF Stansted Mountfitchet		B-26	Inactivated 1946
497th Bombardment Squadron, Medium		RAF Stansted Mountfitchet		B-26	Inactivated 1946
498th Bombardment Squadron (Tactical)		Langley AFB	"Falcons"	B-57	Inactivated 1959
499th Bombardment Squadron (Tactical)		Langley AFB	"Bats Outa Hell"	B-25	Inactivated 1959

=== Squadrons 500 to 599 ===
Squadron	Shield	Location	Nickname	Aircraft	Note
500th Bombardment Squadron (Tactical)		Langley AFB	"Rough Raiders"	B-57	Inactivated 1959
501st Bombardment Squadron (Tactical)		Langley AFB	"Black Panthers"	B-57	Inactivated 1959
502d Bombardment Squadron		Dyersburg AAFld		B-24	Inactivated 1944
503d Bombardment Squadron		Dyersburg AAFld		B-24	Inactivated 1944
504th Bombardment Squadron		Dyersburg AAFld		B-24	Inactivated 1944
505th Bombardment Squadron, Heavy		Dyersburg Army Air Base,		B-24	Consolidated 19 September 1985 with the 905th Air Refueling Squadron, Heavy (1959)
506th Bombardment Squadron (Medium)		Lake Charles AFB		B-47	Inactivated 1960
507th Bombardment Squadron (Very Heavy)		Kadena Airbase		B-29	Inactivated 1946
508th Bombardment Squadron, Heavy		RAF Polebrook		B-24	Redesignated 508th Strategic Missile Squadron
509th Bombardment Squadron, Heavy		RAF Polebrook		B-24	Redesignated 509th Strategic Missile Squadron
510th Bombardment Squadron, Heavy		RAF Polebrook		B-24	Redesignated 510th Strategic Missile Squadron
511th Bombardment Squadron (Very Heavy)		Fairfax Field		B-29	Inactivated 1949
512th Bombardment Squadron, Medium		Lockbourne Air Force Base		B-47	Inactivated 1965
513th Bombardment Squadron, Medium		Lockbourne Air Force Base		B-47	Inactivated 1965 & Redesignated 513th Electronic Warfare Squadron (2009)
514th Bombardment Squadron, Medium		Lockbourne Air Force Base		B-47	Redesignated 514th Flight Test Squadron in 1970
515th Bombardment Squadron, Medium		Lockbourne Air Force Base		B-47	Inactivated 1965
516th Bombardment Squadron (Heavy)		Ft Dix AAB		B-24	Redesignated 11th Antisubmarine Squadron (Heavy) (1942)
517th Bombardment Squadron (Heavy)		Atlantic City Airport		B-24	Redesignated 12th Antisubmarine Squadron (Heavy) (1942)
518th Bombardment Squadron (Heavy)		Grenier Field		B-24	Redesignated 13th Antisubmarine Squadron (Heavy) (1942)
519th Bombardment Squadron (Heavy)		Otis Field		B-24	Redesignated 14th Antisubmarine Squadron (Heavy) (1942)
520th Bombardment Squadron (Heavy)		Wendover Field		B-24	Redesignated 15th Antisubmarine Squadron (Heavy) (1942)
521st Bombardment Squadron (Medium)		Charleston AAF		B-37	Redesignated 16th Antisubmarine Squadron (Heavy) (1942), then 820th Bombardment Squadron, Heavy (1943)
522d Bombardment Squadron (Heavy)		Palm Beach County Park Airport		B-24	Redesignated 17th Antisubmarine Squadron (Heavy) (1942)
523d Bombardment Squadron		Port Lyautey		B-24	Redesignated 2d Antisubmarine Squadron (Heavy) (1942)
524th Bombardment Squadron (Heavy)		Wurtsmith AFB		B-52G	Inactivated 1993
525th Bombardment Squadron (Heavy)		Minot AFB		B-52	Inactivated 1963
526th Bombardment Squadron (Heavy)		K.I. Sawyer AFB		B-52	Inactivated 1963
527th Bombardment Squadron, Medium		Homestead AFB		B-47	Discontinued 1961
528th Bombardment Squadron, Medium		Plattsburgh AFB		FB-111	Inactivated 1991
529th Bombardment Squadron, Medium		Plattsburgh AFB		FB-111	Inactivated 1991
530th Bombardment Squadron, Medium		Plattsburgh AFB		B-47	Inactivated 1962
531st Bombardment Squadron, Medium		Plattsburgh AFB		B-47	Inactivated 1962
532d Bombardment Squadron, Very Heavy		Offutt Field		B-17	Redesignated 532d Strategic Missile Squadron 1961
533d Bombardment Squadron, Heavy		RAF Ridgewell		B-17	Redesignated 533d Strategic Missile Squadron 1962
534th Bombardment Squadron, Very Heavy		RAF Ridgewell		B-17	Inactivated 1949
535th Bombardment Squadron, Very Heavy		RAF Ridgewell		B-17	Inactivated 1949
536th Bombardment Squadron (Heavy)		Muroc Army Air Base		B-24	Redesignated 336th Troop Carrier Squadron, Medium (1949)
537th Bombardment Squadron (Heavy)		Muroc Army Air Base		B-24	Inactivated 1944
538th Bombardment Squadron (Heavy)		Muroc Army Air Base		B-24	Inactivated 1944
539th Bombardment Squadron (Heavy)		Muroc Army Air Base		B-24	Inactivated 1944
540th Bombardment Squadron (Heavy)		Peterson Field		B-17, B-24	Inactivated 1944
541st Bombardment Squadron (Heavy)		Peterson Field		B-17, B-24	Inactivated 1944
542d Bombardment Squadron (Heavy)		Peterson Field		B-17, B-24	Inactivated 1944
543d Bombardment Squadron (Heavy)		Peterson Field		B-17, B-24	Inactivated 1944
544th Bombardment Squadron, Medium		Little Rock AFB		B-47	Inactivated 1964
545th Bombardment Squadron, Medium		Little Rock AFB		B-47	Inactivated 1964
546th Bombardment Squadron, Medium		Little Rock AFB		B-47	Inactivated 1964
547th Bombardment Squadron, Medium		Little Rock AFB		B-47	Inactivated 1962
548th Bombardment Squadron, Very Heavy		RAF Great Ashfield		B-17	Redesignated 548th Strategic Missile Squadron (1960)
549th Bombardment Squadron, Very Heavy		RAF Great Ashfield		B-17	Redesignated 549th Strategic Missile Squadron (1960)
550th Bombardment Squadron, Very Heavy		RAF Great Ashfield		B-17	Redesignated 550th Strategic Missile Squadron (1960)
551st Bombardment Squadron, Very Heavy		RAF Great Ashfield		B-17	Redesignated 551st Strategic Missile Squadron (1960)
552d Bombardment Squadron, Light		RAF Great Dunmow,		B-26	Inactivated 1945
553d Bombardment Squadron, Light		RAF Great Dunmow,		B-26	Inactivated 1945
554th Bombardment Squadron, Light		RAF Great Dunmow,		B-26	Inactivated 1945
555th Bombardment Squadron, Light		RAF Great Dunmow,		B-26	Redesignated 555th Tactical Fighter Squadron (1964)
556th Bombardment Squadron, Medium		RAF Stoney Cross		B-26	
557th Bombardment Squadron, Medium		RAF Stoney Cross		B-26	Redesignated 557th Tactical Fighter Squadron (1962)
558th Bombardment Squadron, Medium		RAF Stoney Cross		B-26	Redesignated 558th Tactical Fighter Squadron (1962)
559th Bombardment Squadron, Medium		RAF Stoney Cross		B-26	
560th Bombardment Squadron, Heavy		RAF Knettishall		B-17	Redesignated 560th Tactical Fighter Squadron (1962)
561st Bombardment Squadron, Heavy		RAF Knettishall		B-17	Redesignated 561st Fighter-Bomber Squadron (1953)
562d Bombardment Squadron, Heavy		RAF Knettishall		B-17	Redesignated 562d Fighter-Bomber Squadron (1953)
563d Bombardment Squadron, Heavy		RAF Knettishall		B-17	Redesignated 562d Fighter-Bomber Squadron (1953)
564th Bombardment Squadron (Very Heavy)		Fairfax Field		B-36	Redesignated 564th Strategic Missile Squadron (1958)
565th Bombardment Squadron, Very Heavy		RAF Hethel		B-24	Redesignated 565th Strategic Missile Squadron (1958)
566th Bombardment Squadron, Very Heavy		RAF Hethel		B-24	Redesignated 566th Strategic Missile Squadron (1959)
567th Bombardment Squadron, Very Heavy		RAF Hethel		B-24	Redesignated 567th Strategic Missile Squadron (1959)
568th Bombardment Squadron, Very Heavy		RAF Framlingham		B-17	Redesignated 568th Strategic Missile Squadron (1960)
569th Bombardment Squadron, Very Heavy		RAF Framlingham		B-17	Redesignated 569th Strategic Missile Squadron (1960)
570th Bombardment Squadron, Very Heavy		RAF Framlingham		B-17	Redesignated 570th Strategic Missile Squadron (1961)
571st Bombardment Squadron, Very Heavy		RAF Framlingham		B-17	Redesignated 571st Strategic Missile Squadron (1961)
572d Bombardment Squadron, Medium		RAF Matching		B-26	Inactivated 1945
573d Bombardment Squadron, Medium		RAF Matching		B-26	Inactivated 1945
574th Bombardment Squadron, Medium		RAF Matching		B-26	Inactivated 1945
575th Bombardment Squadron, Medium		RAF Matching		B-26	Inactivated 1945
576th Bombardment Squadron, Light		Barksdale AFB		B-24	Redesignated 576th Strategic Missile Squadron (1958)
577th Bombardment Squadron, Very Heavy		RAF Wendling		B-24	Redesignated 577th Strategic Missile Squadron (1960)
578th Bombardment Squadron, Very Heavy		RAF Wendling		B-24	Redesignated 578th Strategic Missile Squadron (1961)
579th Bombardment Squadron, Very Heavy		RAF Wendling		B-24	Redesignated 579th Strategic Missile Squadron (1961)
580th Bombardment Squadron, Heavy		Sioux City AAB		B-17	Inactivated 1944
581st Bombardment Squadron, Heavy		Sioux City AAB		B-17	Inactivated 1944
582d Bombardment Squadron, Heavy		Sioux City AAB		B-17	Inactivated 1944
583d Bombardment Squadron, Heavy		Sioux City AAB		B-17	Inactivated 1944
584th Bombardment Squadron, Medium		RAF Holmsley South,		B-26 Marauder late April = A-26 Invader	Consolidated 19 September 1985 with the 384th Air Refueling Squadron, Medium (1955)
585th Bombardment Squadron, Medium		RAF Holmsley South,		B-26 Marauder late April = A-26 Invader	Inactivated 1945
586th Bombardment Squadron, Medium		RAF Holmsley South,		B-26 Marauder late April = A-26 Invader	Consolidated with 6586th Test Squadron (1992)
587th Bombardment Squadron, Medium		RAF Holmsley South,		B-26 Marauder late April = A-26 Invader	Inactivated 1945
588th Bombardment Squadron, Heavy		Ardmore Army Air Field		B-17	Inactivated 1944
589th Bombardment Squadron, Heavy		Ardmore Army Air Field		B-17	Inactivated 1944
590th Bombardment Squadron (Heavy)		Ardmore Army Air Field		B-17	Inactivated 1944
591st Bombardment Squadron (Heavy)		Ardmore Army Air Field		B-17	Inactivated 1944
592d Bombardment Squadron, Heavy		Drew Field		B-17	Inactivated 1944
593d Bombardment Squadron, Heavy		Drew Field		B-17	Inactivated 1944
594th Bombardment Squadron, Heavy		Drew Field		B-17	Inactivated 1944
595th Bombardment Squadron, Heavy		Drew Field		B-17	Redesignated 165th Liaison Squadron (Commando) (1944)
596th Bombardment Squadron (Heavy)		Barksdale AFB		B-52H	Inactivated 1991
597th Bombardment Squadron (Medium)		Camp Kilmer		B-26	Inactivated 1945
598th Bombardment Squadron (Medium)		Camp Kilmer		B-26	Inactivated 1945
599th Bombardment Squadron (Medium)		Camp Kilmer		B-26	Inactivated 1945

=== Squadrons 600 to 699 ===
Squadron	Shield	Location	Nickname	Aircraft	Note
600th Bombardment Squadron (Heavy)		Drew Field, FL		B-17	Inactivated 1945
601st Bombardment Squadron (Heavy)		Drew Field, FL		B-17	Inactivated 1945
602d Bombardment Squadron (Heavy)		Drew Field, FL		B-17	Inactivated 1945
603d Bombardment Squadron (Heavy)		Drew Field, FL		B-17	Inactivated 1945
604th Bombardment Squadron (Heavy)		March Field, CA		B-24	Inactivated 1944
605th Bombardment Squadron (Heavy)		March Field, CA		B-24	Inactivated 1944
606th Bombardment Squadron (Heavy)		March Field, CA		B-24	Inactivated 1944
607th Bombardment Squadron (Heavy)		March Field, CA		B-24	Inactivated 1944
608th Bombardment Squadron (Heavy)		Charleston Army Air Field, SC		B-24	Inactivated 1944
609th Bombardment Squadron (Heavy)		Charleston Army Air Field, SC		B-24	Inactivated 1944
610th Bombardment Squadron (Heavy)		Charleston Army Air Field, SC		B-24	Inactivated 1944
611th Bombardment Squadron (Heavy)		Charleston Army Air Field, SC		B-24	Inactivated 1944
612th Bombardment Squadron (Heavy)		Biggs AFB, TX		B-17	Inactivated 1951, Redesignated 612th Tactical Fighter Squadron (1953)
613th Bombardment Squadron (Heavy)		Biggs AFB, TX		B-17	Inactivated 1951, Redesignated 613th Tactical Fighter Squadron (1953)
614th Bombardment Squadron (Very Heavy)		Biggs AFB, TX		B-17	Inactivated 1949, Redesignated 614th Tactical Fighter Squadron (1953)
615th Bombardment Squadron (Very Heavy)		Biggs AFB, TX		B-17	Inactivated 1949, Redesignated 615th Tactical Fighter Squadron (1953)
616th Bombardment Squadron (Medium)		Freeman Field, IN		B-25	Inactivated 1945, Tuskegee Airmen
617th Bombardment Squadron (Medium)		Lockbourne Army Airbase, OH		B-25	Inactivated 1947, Tuskegee Airmen
618th Bombardment Squadron (Medium)		Freeman Field, IN		B-25	Inactivated 1945, Tuskegee Airmen
619th Bombardment Squadron (Medium)		Freeman Field, IN		B-25	Inactivated 1945, Tuskegee Airmen
628th Bombardment Squadron (Dive)		Key Field, MS		A-26	Redesignated 512th Fighter Squadron (1943)
629th Bombardment Squadron (Dive)		Key Field, MS		A-26	Redesignated 513th Fighter Squadron (1943)
630th Bombardment Squadron (Dive)		Key Field, MS		A-26	Redesignated 514th Fighter Squadron (1943)
631st Bombardment Squadron (Dive)		Key Field, MS		A-26	Inactivated 1943
632d Bombardment Squadron (Dive)		Amchitka, Alaska		A-24	Redesignated 515th Fighter Squadron (1943)
633d Bombardment Squadron (Dive)		Amchitka, Alaska		A-24	Redesignated 516th Fighter Squadron (1943)
634th Bombardment Squadron (Dive)		Amchitka, Alaska		A-24	Redesignated 517th Fighter Squadron (1943)
635th Bombardment Squadron (Dive)		Amchitka, Alaska		A-24	Inactivated 1943
636th Bombardment Squadron (Dive)		Key Field, MS		A-24	Redesignated 518th Fighter Squadron (1943)
637th Bombardment Squadron (Dive)		Key Field, MS		A-24	Redesignated 519th Fighter Squadron (1943)
638th Bombardment Squadron (Dive)		Key Field, MS		A-24	Redesignated 520th Fighter Squadron (1943)
639th Bombardment Squadron (Dive)		Key Field, MS		A-24	Inactivated 1943
640th Bombardment Squadron (Light)		Laon-Couvron Air Base, France		A-26	Inactivated 1945
641st Bombardment Squadron (Light)		Laon-Couvron Air Base, France		A-26	Inactivated 1945
642d Bombardment Squadron (Light)		Laon-Couvron Air Base, France		A-26	Inactivated 1945
643d Bombardment Squadron (Light)		Laon-Couvron Air Base, France		A-26	Inactivated 1945
644th Bomb Squadron		K.I. Sawyer AFB		B-52H	Inactivated 1994
645th Bombardment Squadron (Light)		RAF Gosfield		A-20 Havoc	Inactivated 1945
646th Bombardment Squadron (Light)		RAF Gosfield		A-20 Havoc	Inactivated 1945
647th Bombardment Squadron (Light)		RAF Gosfield		A-20 Havoc	Inactivated 1945
652d Bombardment Squadron (Heavy, Weather Reconnaissance)		RAF Alconbury		B-17	Inactivated 1945
653d Bombardment Squadron (Heavy, Weather Reconnaissance)		RAF Watton		B-17	Inactivated 1945
658th Bombardment Squadron		Mountain Home AFB		B-47	
668th Bomb Squadron		Griffiss AFB		B-52H	Inactivated 1995
676th Bombardment Squadron, Very Heavy		Davis-Monthan Field		B-29	Inactivated 1946
677th Bombardment Squadron, Very Heavy		Davis-Monthan Field		B-29	Inactivated 1946
678th Bombardment Squadron, Very Heavy		Davis-Monthan Field		B-29	Inactivated 1946
679th Bombardment Squadron, Very Heavy		Charra, India		B-29	Inactivated 1944
680th Bombardment Squadron, Very Heavy		North Field, Tinian		B-29	Inactivated 1945
681st Bombardment Squadron, Medium		Little Rock AFB		B-47	Inactivated 1962

=== Squadrons 700 to 799 ===
Squadron	Shield	Location	Nickname	Aircraft	Note
700th Bombardment Squadron, Very Heavy		RAF Tibenham, UK		B-24	Redesignated 700th Fighter-Bomber Squadron (1952)
701st Bombardment Squadron, Very Heavy		RAF Tibenham, UK		B-24	Redesignated 701st Fighter-Bomber Squadron (1952)
702d Bombardment Squadron		Fresno Air Base		B-29	Inactivated 1949
703d Bombardment Squadron		Fresno Air Base		B-29	Inactivated 1949
704th Bombardment Squadron		Carswell AFB		B-29	Redesignated 704th Troop Carrier Squadron (Medium) (1955)
709th Bombardment Squadron, Very Heavy		Bergstrom AFB			Redesignated 709th Military Airlift Squadron (Associate) (1973)
711th Bombardment Squadron, Light		Long Beach Municipal Airport, CA		B-17	Redesignated 711th Fighter-Bomber Squadron (1952) (1973)
712th Bombardment Squadron		Long Beach Municipal Airport		B-26	Inactivated 1951
713th Bombardment Squadron		Long Beach Municipal Airport		B-26	Inactivated 1951
714th Bombardment Squadron		Long Beach Municipal Airport		B-26	Inactivated 1951
715th Bombardment Squadron, Medium		Plattsburgh AFB		FB-111	Inactivated 1990 & Redesignated 715th Weapons Squadron (2003)
716th Bombardment Squadron (Heavy)		Kincheloe AFB		B-52H	Inactivated 1977
717th Bombardment Squadron (Heavy)		Sheppard AFB		B-52D	Inactivated 1963
718th Bombardment Squadron (Heavy)		Amarillo AFB		B-52D	Inactivated 1963, Redesignated 718th Intelligence Squadron (2011)
719th Bombardment Squadron (Very Heavy)		Grand Island Army Field		B-29	Redesignated 46th Reconnaissance Squadron (Very Long Range, Photographic-Weather)
720th Bombardment Squadron, Heavy		Minot AFB		B-52H	Inactivated 1968
728th Bombardment Squadron, Tactical		Long Beach Municipal Airport,		B-26	Redesignated 728th Tactical Airlift Squadron (1967)
729th Bombardment Squadron, Tactical		Long Beach Municipal Airport,		B-26	Redesignated 729th Tactical Airlift Squadron (1967)
730th Bombardment Squadron, Tactical		Long Beach Municipal Airport,		B-26	Redesignated 730th Tactical Airlift Squadron (1967)
731st bombardment Squadron (Light, Night Attack)		Miho Air Base, Japan		B-26	Inactivated 1951
732d Bombardment Squadron		Fort Dix Army Air Base		B-24	Inactivated 1945
733d Bombardment Squadron		Fort Dix Army Air Base		B-24	Inactivated 1945
734th Bombardment Squadron		Fort Dix Army Air Base		B-24	Inactivated 1945
735th Bombardment Squadron		Fort Dix Army Air Base		B-24	Inactivated 1945
736th Bombardment Squadron		Columbus AFB		B-52C/D/F	Inactivated 1969
737th Bombardment Squadron		McChord AFB		B-29	Inactivated 1949
738th Bombardment Squadron		McChord AFB		B-29	Inactivated 1949
739th Bombardment Squadron		McChord AFB		B-29	Inactivated 1949
740th Bombardment Squadron		Minot AFB			
741st Bombardment Squadron		Minot AFB			
742d Bombardment Squadron		Minot AFB			
743d Bombardment Squadron					
744th Bombardment Squadron		Beale AFB		B-52G	Inactivated 1975
752d Bombardment Squadron, Very Heavy		March Field		B-29	Inactivated 1945
753d Bombardment Squadron, Very Heavy		March Field		B-29	Inactivated 1945
754th Bombardment Squadron, Very Heavy		March Field		B-29	Inactivated 1945
755th Bombardment Squadron, Very Heavy		March Field		B-29	Consolidated 19 September 1985 with the 55th Air Refueling Squadron, Medium (1950)
756th Bombardment Squadron, Medium		Giulia Airfield, Italy		B-24	Redesignated 756th Troop Carrier Squadron, Medium (1954)
760th Bombardment Squadron		Spinazzola Airfield		B-24	Inactivated 1945
761st Bombardment Squadron		Spinazzola Airfield		B-24	Inactivated 1945
762d Bombardment Squadron		Spinazzola Airfield		B-24	Inactivated 1945
763d Bombardment Squadron		Spinazzola Airfield		B-24	Inactivated 1945
764th Bombardment Squadron		Amarillo AFB		B-52C/D	Inactivated 1968
765th Bombardment Squadron, Heavy		Torretto Airfield, Italy		B-24	Inactivated 1945
766th Bombardment Squadron, Heavy		Torretto Airfield, Italy		B-24	Inactivated 1945
767th Bombardment Squadron, Heavy		Torretto Airfield, Italy		B-24	Inactivated 1945
768th Bombardment Squadron, Heavy		Larson AFB		B-52D	Inactivated 1966
769th Bombardment Squadron, Very Heavy		MacDill Field		B-29	Inactivated 1946
770th Bombardment Squadron, Very Heavy		MacDill Field		B-29	Inactivated 1946
771st Bombardment Squadron, Very Heavy		Piardoba, India		B-29	Inactivated 1944
772d Bombardment Squadron, Heavy		Celone Airfield, Italy		B-17	Redesignated 772d Troop Carrier Squadron, Medium (1952)
773d Bombardment Squadron, Heavy		Celone Airfield, Italy		B-17	Redesignated 773d Troop Carrier Squadron, Medium (1952)
774th Bombardment Squadron, Heavy		Celone Airfield, Italy		B-17	Redesignated 774th Troop Carrier Squadron, Medium (1952)
781st Bombardment Squadron, Heavy		Robins AFB		B-52G	Inactivated 1968
784th Bombardment Squadron, Very Heavy		Davis-Monthan Field		B-29	Inactivated 1945
785th Bombardment Squadron, Very Heavy		Davis-Monthan Field		B-29	Inactivated 1945
786th Bombardment Squadron, Very Heavy		Davis-Monthan Field		B-29	Inactivated 1945
787th Bombardment Squadron, Very Heavy		Davis-Monthan Field		B-29	Inactivated 1945
788th Bombardment Squadron (Provisional)		RAF Harrington		B-24	Inactivated 1945
788th Bombardment Squadron, Very Heavy		Clovis AAF		B-29	Inactivated 1946
789th Bombardment Squadron, Very Heavy		Clovis AAF		B-29	Inactivated 1946
790th Bombardment Squadron, Very Heavy		Clovis AAF		B-29	Inactivated 1946
791st Bombardment Squadron (Very Heavy)		Clovis AAF		B-29	Inactivated 1946

=== Squadrons 800 to 899 ===
Squadron	Shield	Location	Nickname	Aircraft	Note
815th Bombardment Squadron (Heavy)		Pisa, Italy		B-17	Redesignated 815th Troop Carrier Squadron (1953)
816th Bombardment Squadron (Heavy)		Pisa, Italy		B-17	Redesignated 816th Troop Carrier Squadron (1953)
817th Bombardment Squadron (Heavy)		Pisa, Italy		B-17	Redesignated 817 Troop Carrier Squadron, Medium (1952)
819th Bombardment Squadron		East Field, Saipan		B-24	Inactivated 1945
820th Bombardment Squadron (Heavy)		Makin Field		B-25	Inactivated 1946
822d Bombardment Squadron, Tactical		Laon-Couvron Air Base, France		B-57	Redesignated 822d Tactical Missile Squadron (1958)
823d Bombardment Squadron, Medium		Itazuke AB, Japan		B-25	Redesignated 823d Tactical Missile Squadron (1962)
824th Bombardment Squadron, Heavy		Turner AFB		B-52D	Inactivated 1967
828th Bombardment Squadron (Very Heavy)		Smoky Hill AAF		B-29	Inactivated 1946
829th Bombardment Squadron (Very Heavy)		Smoky Hill AAF		B-29	Inactivated 1946
830th Bombardment Squadron (Very Heavy)		Smoky Hill AAF		B-29	Inactivated 1946
831st Bombardment Squadron (Heavy)		Venosa		B-24	Inactivated 1945
832d Bombardment Squadron (Heavy)		RAF Sudbury		B-17	Inactivated 1945
833d Bombardment Squadron (Heavy)		RAF Sudbury		B-17	Inactivated 1945
834th Bombardment Squadron (Heavy)		RAF Sudbury		B-17	Inactivated 1945
835th Bombardment Squadron (Heavy)		RAF Sudbury		B-17	Inactivated 1945
840th Bombardment Squadron, Heavy		Pisa, Italy		B-17	Inactivated 1945
844th Bombardment Squadron, Heavy		RAF Halesworth		B-24	Inactivated 1945
845th Bombardment Squadron, Heavy		RAF Halesworth		B-24	Inactivated 1945
846th Bombardment Squadron, Heavy		RAF Halesworth		B-24	Inactivated 1945
847th Bombardment Squadron, Heavy		RAF Halesworth		B-24	Inactivated 1945
848th Bombardment Squadron, Heavy		RAF Eye		B-24 B-17	Inactivated 1945
849th Bombardment Squadron, Heavy		RAF Eye		B-24 B-17	Inactivated 1945
850th Bombardment Squadron (Provisional)		RAF Harrington		B-24	Inactivated 1945
850th Bombardment Squadron (Heavy)		RAF Eye		B-24 B-17	Redesignated 850th Strategic Missile Squadron (1960)
851st Bombardment Squadron (Heavy)		RAF Eye		B-24 B-17	Redesignated 851st Strategic Missile Squadron (1960)
852d Bombardment Squadron (Heavy)		RAF North Pickenham		B-24	Inactivated 1945
853d Bombardment Squadron (Heavy)		RAF North Pickenham		B-24	Inactivated 1945
854th Bombardment Squadron (Heavy)		RAF North Pickenham		B-24	Inactivated 1945
855th Bombardment Squadron (Heavy)		RAF North Pickenham		B-24	Inactivated 1945
856th Bombardment Squadron (Very Heavy)		RAF Harrington		B-24	Inactivated 1945
857th Bombardment Squadron (Very Heavy)		RAF Harrington		B-24	Inactivated 1945
858th Bombardment Squadron (Very Heavy)		RAF Harrington		B-24	Inactivated 1945
859th Bombardment Squadron (Heavy)		RAF Harrington		B-24	Consolidated with 788th Bombardment Squadron (Provisional); Inactivated 1945
860th Bombardment Squadron (Heavy)		RAF Debach	Shunter	B-17G B-24H/J	Inactivated 28 August 1945
861st Bombardment Squadron (Heavy)		RAF Debach	Begman	B-17G B-24H/J	Inactivated 28 August 1945
862d Bombardment Squadron (Heavy)		RAF Debach	Company	B-17G B-24H/J	Consolidated with 962d Airborne Early Warning & Control Squadron (1985)
863d Bombardment Squadron (Heavy)		RAF Debach	Pillar	B-17G B-24H/J	Inactivated 28 August 1945
864th Bombardment Squadron (Heavy)		Sheppard AFB		B-52D	Inactivated 1966
865th Bombardment Squadron (Heavy)		Yontan Airfield		B-29	Redesignated 865th Strategic Missile Squadron (1958)
866th Bombardment Squadron, Very Heavy		Yontan Airfield		B-29	Redesignated 866th Strategic Missile Squadron (1958)
867th Bombardment Squadron, Very Heavy		Yontan Airfield		B-29	Inactivated 1946
873d Bombardment Squadron, Very Heavy		MacDill Field		B-29	Redesignated 873d Tactical Missile Squadron (1961)
874th Bombardment Squadron, Very Heavy		MacDill Field		B-29	Redesignated 874th Tactical Missile Squadron (1961)
875th Bombardment Squadron, Very Heavy		MacDill Field		B-29	Inactivated 1946
876th Bombardment Squadron, Very Heavy		Okinawa		B-29	Inactivated 1946
880th Bombardment Squadron, Very Heavy		Okinawa		B-29	Inactivated 1946
884th Bombardment Squadron, Very Heavy		Okinawa		B-29	Inactivated 1946

=== Squadrons 900 onwards ===
Squadron	Shield	Location	Nickname	Aircraft	Note
4017th Combat Crew Training Squadron		Castle AFB		B-52B	Replaced by 329th Combat Crew Training Squadron (1986)
4018th Combat Crew Training Squadron		Carswell AFB		B-52D	Inactivated 1974
4129th Combat Crew Training Squadron		Walker AFB		B-52E	Inactivated 1963
4347th Combat Crew Training Squadron		McConnell AFB		TB-47B	Inactivated 1963
4348th Combat Crew Training Squadron		McConnell AFB		TB-47B	Inactivated 1963
4349th Combat Crew Training Squadron		McConnell AFB		TB-47B	Inactivated 1963
4350th Combat Crew Training Squadron		McConnell AFB		TB-47B	Inactivated 1963
