= Ontario Land Tribunal =

Agency of the Government of Ontario

- French: Tribunal ontarien de l’aménagement du territoire
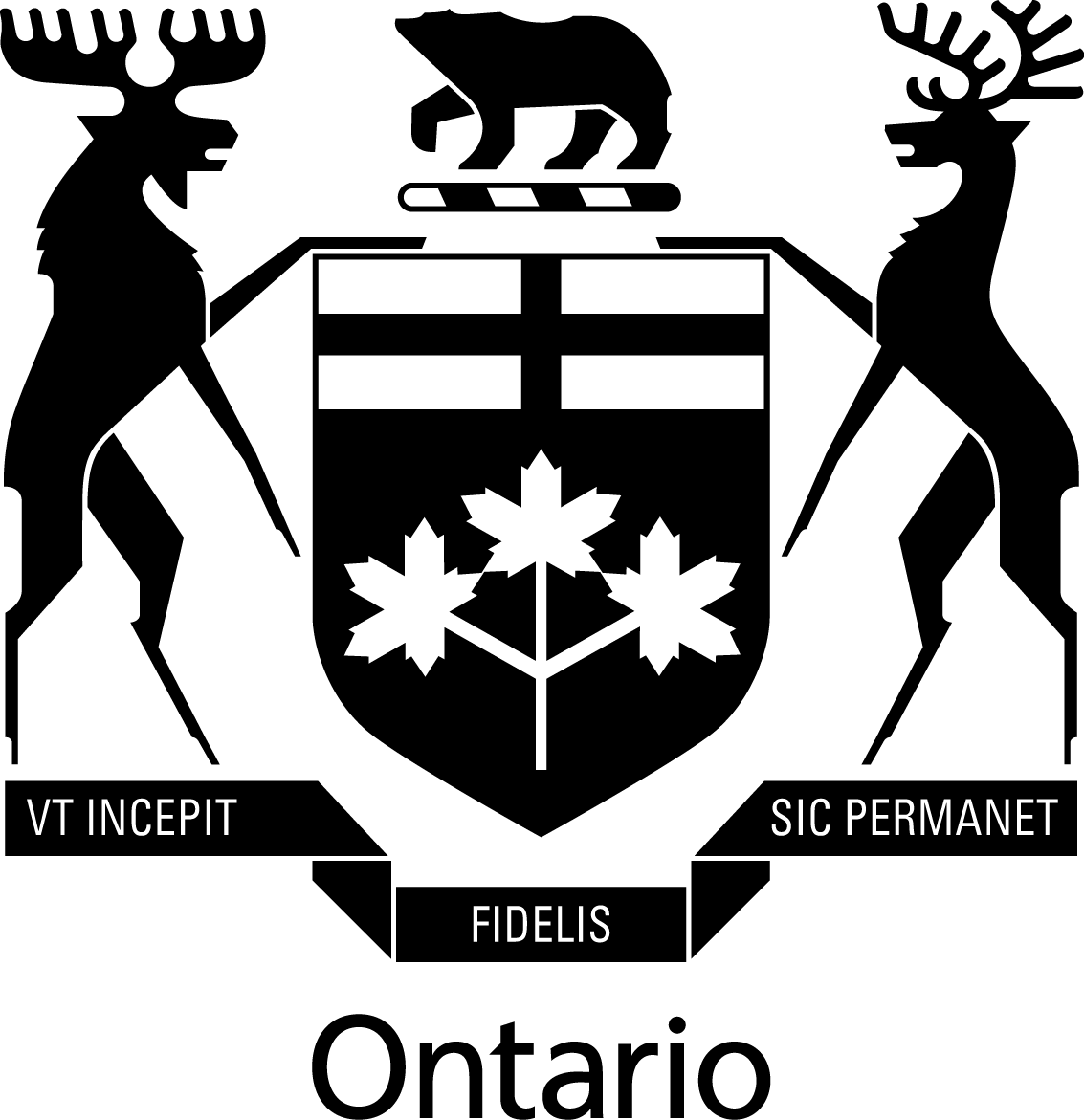
- Arms of the Government of Ontario

Agency overview
- Formed: June 1, 2021
- Preceding agency: Ontario Municipal Board
- Jurisdiction: Government of Ontario
- Headquarters: 655 Bay Street Suite 1500 Toronto, Ontario M5G 1E5
- Minister responsible: Doug Downey, Attorney General
- Agency executive: Michael Kraljevic, Chair
- Key document: Ontario Land Tribunal Act

The Ontario Land Tribunal (OLT) is a tribunal of the Government of Ontario that is responsible for adjudicating land use planning and related matters in the Canadian province of Ontario. The OLT was formed on June 1, 2021, replacing the Local Planning Appeal Tribunal, formed in 2018 to replace the Ontario Municipal Board.

== History ==
The OLT traces its origins to the Ontario Railway and Municipal Board, established in 1906 "to oversee municipalities' accounts and to supervise the then rapidly growing rail transportation system between and within municipalities." In so doing, it took over responsibility of these functions from the former Railway Committee of the Executive Council and Office of the Provincial Municipal Auditor. It was amalgamated with the Bureau of Municipal Affairs and renamed to the Ontario Municipal Board in 1932.

In 2010, under the Adjudicative Tribunals Accountability, Governance and Appointments Act, 2009, the OMB was designated as part of a cluster known as "Environment and Land Tribunals Ontario", which also includes the Assessment Review Board, boards of negotiation under the Expropriations Act, the Conservation Review Board and the Environmental Review Tribunal.

The OMB heard applications and appeals on municipal and planning disputes, as well as other matters specified in provincial legislation. The tribunal reported to the Ministry of the Attorney General from 2012 until it was replaced in 2018. The Board had been criticized for its broad powers and authority to override the Planning Act decisions of municipal councils.

The Ontario Municipal Board was replaced by the Local Planning Appeal Tribunal on April 3, 2018, which was intended to have more limited powers and a reduced scope. The Local Planning Appeal Tribunal was in turn replaced by the Ontario Land Tribunal on June 1, 2021.

== Scope of jurisdiction ==
The OMB was constituted under the Ontario Municipal Board Act, (OMB Act) which conferred "exclusive jurisdiction in all cases and in respect of all matters in which jurisdiction is conferred on it by this Act or by any other general or special Act". Until 2009, its decisions could be appealed by petition to the Lieutenant-Governor in Council, but such petitions were abolished by the Good Government Act, 2009, after which decisions of the OMB were final, subject only to appeals to the Divisional Court on a question of law with that Court's leave.

While the Act declared that the Board "has all the powers of a court of record", in 1938 the Judicial Committee of the Privy Council held that it is not a superior court, but in pith and substance an administrative body. Appeals to the OMB were described as "a process requiring the OMB to exercise its public interest mandate", and "on an appeal the Board had the obligation to exercise its independent judgment".

The Board had general jurisdiction in municipal matters, as well as over provincially-regulated railways and public utilities (other than matters that are within the jurisdiction of the Ontario Energy Board). It had been conferred further powers under the Railways Act, the Municipal Act the City of Toronto Act, the Planning Act and the Ontario Heritage Act.

== Procedure ==
=== Hearings ===
Before reaching a decision, the OMB conducted hearings, which were in oral, electronic or written form. Where a matter to be heard was expected to be long or complex, involving many issues, parties and types of evidence, the Board normally held a prehearing to help organize proceedings for subsequent hearings, which included identification of issues to be considered at such hearings. The Board expected parties who placed an issue on the Issue List to call a case in support of that issue.

The Board could award costs against parties who opposed successful applicants, but only when it was requested to do so.

=== Decisions ===
The Archives of Ontario holds some past OMB decisions, but the collection is limited to the years 1906–1991 (but certain records in that period have been previously destroyed).

The OMB makes the following jurisprudence available online:

- Decisions from 2001 to the present.
- Orders from January 21, 2013, to the present.

Carswell publishes Ontario Municipal Board Reports, which is available in law libraries, as well as online at Westlaw. Decisions are also available online at LexisNexis.

== Criticism of the Ontario Municipal Board ==
The jurisdiction the Board could exercise was extremely broad in scope, and a Royal Commission inquiry headed by James McRuer reported in 1971 that it was impossible to catalogue all the powers that the Board possessed at that time, although thirty principal Acts were identified. However, an extraordinary provision of the OMB Act allowed for investigation and determination of any matter, where provision was made for it under the letters patent of any corporation formed under Ontario law.

Another provision of the OMB Act, allowing the Board to require or prohibit the performance of any matter under any Act or agreement, was considered to be "an absurdly broad power and in its breadth it is unconstitutional".

The Board tended to subordinate both provincial and local policies to those of its own making, which successive governments effectively transformed into a policy "of overseeing municipal activities without direct provincial involvement". There was discussion as to whether it had outlived its usefulness as a planning review tribunal, as "it does little that could not be done by local decision makers".

On October 7, 2008, City of Toronto councillors representing the former city of North York voted to name a lane "OMB Folly" in the area where the OMB, against the city's wishes, approved development of a condominium and townhouse complex near a low-density residential area immediately west of North York City Centre. However, Council reversed this decision on 26 August 2010.

After a controversial 2009 decision approved a community of up to 1,400 homes in the Manotick neighbourhood of Ottawa, Minister of Municipal Affairs Jim Watson was quoted in the local press as stating: "Has the OMB been perfect? No. Can it improve? Yes, I think it can and I am quite prepared to work with the attorney general to try and ensure that the OMB is more reflective of community values [...] I've had a couple of discussions with the attorney general going back a month and we both agree we are going to take a thorough look at the OMB and see how we can further improve it based on changes we made a couple of years ago. We want to see if they've done what we hoped they'd do to bring greater balance to OMB decision-making."

On February 6, 2012, Toronto City Council asked the province to free the city from the Ontario Municipal Board's jurisdiction. Council endorsed the proposal in a 34–5 vote. Spearheaded by councillor Josh Matlow, along with councillor Kristyn Wong-Tam. Matlow is quoted in the Toronto Star: "We've heard time and time again from our residents that there's an inequitable playing field...Developers simply have a better chance at the OMB because they have the financial resources, the ability to get planners and lawyers, anything they need to be able to argue their case". This proposal should open the door for discussion of the efficiency and justice of the unelected board that controls the majority of Ontario developments.
