= 410 Squadron =

410 Squadron or 410th Squadron may refer to:

- 410 Tactical Fighter Operational Training Squadron, Canada
- 410th Bombardment Squadron, United States
- 410th Flight Test Squadron, United States

== See also ==
- 410th Wing
