= Carswell =

Carswell is a surname of Scottish origin. It may refer to:

== People ==
- Allan Carswell (born 1933), Canadian physicist
- Andy Carswell (1923–2021), Royal Canadian Air Force pilot
- Brandon Carswell (born 1989), American football player
- Catherine Carswell (1879–1946), Scottish novelist, biographer and journalist
- Donald Carswell (1882–1940), Scottish barrister, journalist and author
- Douglas Carswell (born 1971), British politician
- Dwayne Carswell (born 1972), American football player
- Frank Carswell (1919–1998), American baseball player
- Gary Carswell (1968–2015), Manx motorcycle racer
- Harrold Carswell (1919–1992), American judge
- Horace S. Carswell Jr. (1916–1944), United States Army officer, Medal of Honor recipient
- James Carswell (1830–1897), Scottish railway engineer and architect
- Joanna Carswell (born 1988), New Zealand tennis player
- John Carswell (disambiguation), several people
- Robert Carswell (disambiguation), several people
- Rodney Carswell (born 1946) American abstract artist
- Stuart Carswell (born 1993), Scottish football player
- Tim Carswell (born 1971), New Zealand racing cyclist
- William B. Carswell (1883–1953), Scottish-born New York lawyer, judge and politician
- Wilson Carswell (born 1937), Scottish physician

== Fictional characters ==
- Casey Carswell, from the British soap opera Coronation Street
