= John Carswell =

John Carswell may refer to:

- Séon Carsuel (c. 1522 – 1572), Protestant reformer
- J. P. Carswell (John Patrick Carswell, 1918–1997), English civil servant and author
- John Carswell (bowls) (1887–?), Scottish international lawn bowler
- John Caswell (1654 or 1655 – 1712), sometimes John Carswell, English mathematician
- Douglas Carswell (John Douglas Wilson Carswell, born 1971), British Member of Parliament

== See also ==
- Carswell, a surname
