= 395th Bombardment Group =

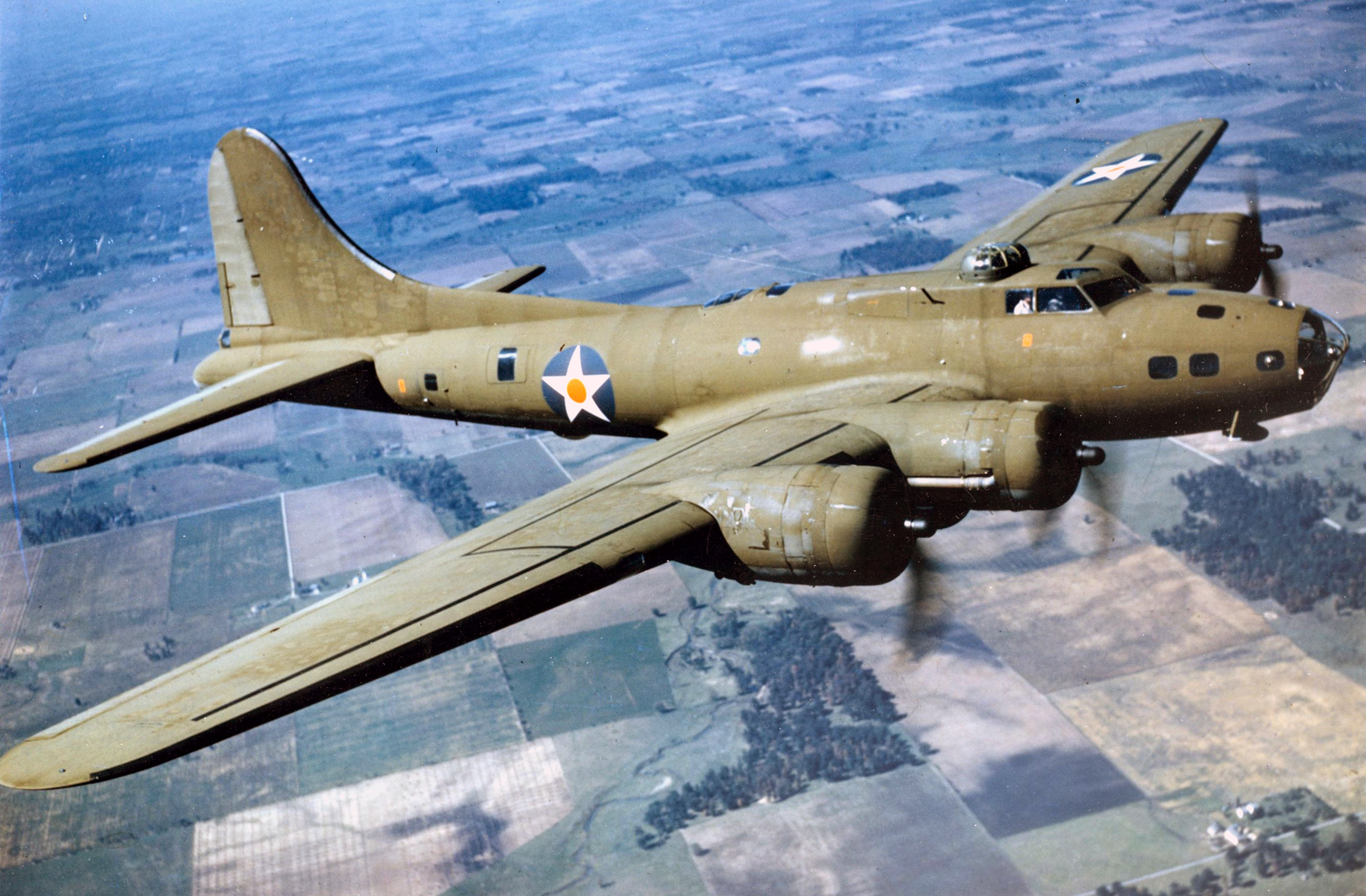
- B-17 Flying Fortress as flown by the group
- Active: 1943–1944
- Country: United States
- Branch: United States Air Force
- Role: Combat Crew Training
- Engagements: American Theater of World War II

The 395th Bombardment Group is an inactive United States Air Force unit. It was part of Second Air Force, serving as a heavy bomber training unit from February 1943 until it was inactivated on 1 April 1944 in a reorganization of Army Air Forces training units.

== History ==
The 395th Bombardment Group was organized at Ephrata Army Air Base, Washington on 16 February 1943. The group drew its original cadre from the 34th Bombardment Group. Its original components were the 588th, 589th, 590th and 591st Bombardment Squadrons. The group served as an Operational Training Unit (OTU) for Boeing B-17 Flying Fortress units preparing for overseas deployment. The OTU program was patterned after the unit training system of the Royal Air Force. It involved the use of an oversized parent unit to provide cadres to "satellite groups" The parent unt then assumed responsibility for their training and oversaw their expansion with graduates of Army Air Forces Training Command schools to become effective combat units. The 398th, 401st and 447th Bombardment Groups were formed at Ephrata during the group's period as an OTU there. A detachment of the group, referred to as the 395th Heavy Bombardment Crew Detachment, conducted Phase I training, acting, in effect, as a fifth squadron of the group. Phase I training concentrated on individual training in crewmember specialties. The 589th and 590th Squadrons conducted Phase II training, each being organized as a provisional group for this purpose. This phase emphasized the coordination for the crew to act as a team. The final phase (Phase III) concentrated on operation as a unit.

In late September 1943, the 483d Bombardment Group was formed at Ephrata. The cadre for this group was provided by the 21st Antisubmarine Squadron, which moved from the Gulf Coast when the Navy took over antisubmarine warfare operations from the Army Air Forces. While the 483d Group was organizing, the 21st Squadron was attached to the 395th Group.

In October 1943, the group and its squadrons moved to Ardmore Army Air Field, Oklahoma, where its mission changed to acting as a Replacement Training Unit (RTU). Like OTUs, RTUs were oversized units, but their mission was to train individual pilots or aircrews. By this time most of the AAF's combat units had been activated and almost three quarters of them had deployed overseas. With the exception of special programs, like forming Boeing B-29 Superfortress units, training “fillers” for existing units became more important than unit training. However, the AAF found that standard military units like the 395th Group, based on relatively inflexible tables of organization were not proving well adapted to the training mission, particularly the training of replacements. Accordingly, the AAF adopted a more functional system in which each base was organized into a separate numbered unit. The group was inactivated on 1 April 1944, along with its components and support elements at Ardmore, and replaced by the 222d AAF Base Unit (Combat Crew Training Station, Bombardment, Heavy).

== Lineage ==
- Constituted as the 395th Bombardment Group (Heavy) on 29 January 1943

Activated on 16 February 1943
Inactivated on 1 April 1944

=== Assignments ===
- II Bomber Command, 1 February 1943 – 1 April 1944

=== Components ===
- 21st Antisubmarine Squadron (later 818th Bombardment Squadron): attached 28 September 1943 – October 1943
- 588th Bombardment Squadron: 16 February 1943 – 1 April 1944
- 589th Bombardment Squadron: 16 February 1943 – 1 April 1944
- 590th Bombardment Squadron: 16 February 1943 – 1 April 1944
- 591st Bombardment Squadron: 16 February 1943 – 1 April 1944

=== Stations ===
- Ephrata Army Air Base, Washington, 16 February 1943
- Ardmore Army Air Field, Oklahoma, 25 October 1943 – 1 April 1944

=== Aircraft ===
- Boeing B-17 Flying Fortress

=== Campaign ===
| Campaign Streamer | Campaign | Dates | Notes |
|---|---|---|---|
| | American Theater without inscription | 16 February 1943 – 1 April 1944 | |
