= Andy Carswell =

Royal Canadian Air Force (RCAF) Avro Lancaster pilot (1923–2021)

- Born: 29 May 1923; California, US
- Died: 25 July 2021 (aged 98); Toronto, Ontario, Canada
- Military career
- Allegiance: Canada
- Branch: Royal Air Force, Royal Canadian Air Force
- Service years: 1940–1950s
- Rank: Flight Lieutenant
- Units: No. 9 Squadron RAF, No. 123 Search and Rescue Unit
- Conflicts: World War II: European Theatre
- Awards: Air Force Cross
- Other work: aviation safety

Andrew Gordon Carswell AFC (29 May 1923 – 25 July 2021) was a Royal Canadian Air Force (RCAF) Avro Lancaster pilot who was shot down near Berlin on his fourth mission in 1943. After returning to Canada after the war, he rejoined the RCAF in 1948 as a search and rescue pilot flying Consolidated Canso flying boats off the coast of British Columbia. During this time he was involved in two famous rescues, including one in 1956 that won him the Air Force Cross which was presented personally by Elizabeth II. He later joined the Ministry of Transport and prepared a 1977 report on the shockingly poor quality of service and training of bush plane pilots operating in northern Ontario. The report led to the reformation of the Ministry's inspection bureaus and, ultimately, the formation of the Transportation Safety Board of Canada.

== Early life ==
Carswell was born on 29 May 1923 in California to Canadian parents. The family moved back to Toronto's Balmy Beach neighbourhood when he was still young.

== Bomber pilot ==
Carswell joined the RCAF on his 18th birthday and began training for multi-engine bombers. He was sent to England and posted to an Avro Lancaster squadron, No. 9 Squadron RAF. On the night of 17/18 January 1943, his fourth operational mission, the aircraft was part of a raid on Berlin. The bomber was hit by anti-aircraft fire and set on fire while still some 150 kilometres (93 mi) from the city. The aircraft flew on for some time, giving the crew ample time to successfully bail out. The aircraft eventually crashed near Zerbst.

Carswell was captured and sent to Stalag VIII-B in Lamsdorf, now in Poland. He attempted to escape on two occasions, both during out-of-camp work details. His first attempt was foiled by an astute railway worker, the second by a police officer in Stettin. After many such escape attempts like these by the internees, the camp command put up signs stating "Notice to Prisoners: Escaping is no Longer a Sport" and threatening to shoot them.

Carswell was repatriated in 1945 when the RAF men were sent on a "death march" westward and eventually met advancing British Army troops.

== Search and Rescue ==
After his return to Canada, Carswell began studies in architecture (Note: The page at the RCAF Association states it was accounting, not architecture.) at the University of Toronto, where he met his future wife Dorothy "Dot" McCreadie at a dance. He also took a position as a flight instructor with Ontario Central Airlines. In 1948 he re-enlisted in the RCAF as a PBY Canso search and rescue pilot and was sent to a base near Vancouver for patrols along the west coast.

On 28 June 1956, Carswell landed in high waves off Galiano Island to rescue the crew of a foundering fishing boat. The high waves damaged the aircraft which began to take on water faster than the pumps could handle. While the crew pulled the two men aboard the aircraft started sinking and had a very difficult takeoff. The event made the newspapers across the country with a quote from one of the fishermen saying "Another 10 minutes or so and the end of the story might have been much different".

On 6 September 1956, Carswell landed the Canso some 600 miles (970 km) off the west coast of Vancouver Island to pick up a critically ill member of the weather ship CGS St. Catharines. Doctors in Victoria stated the patient would not have survived long enough if transported by ship.

In February, the crew of a survey vessel were stranded on a small island on the Sunshine Coast. Carswell landed the Canso in a blizzard and picked up the five-man team. Once again this rescue made the newspapers across the country and in some foreign press, with the crew stating "Thank God for the RCAF".

For these actions, Carswell was awarded the Air Force Cross, presented personally by Elizabeth II.

== Transportation safety ==
After retiring from the RCAF in 1970, Carswell took a position with Transport Canada's aviation safety division as a Regional Air Safety Officer.

After several deadly crashes in northern Ontario, he and fellow inspector William Slaughter were asked to write a report on the operations of the bush plane companies. In 1977, Carswell booked flights for a total of 1,800 miles (2,900 km) of travel using a variety of small airlines. On these trips he noted undertrained pilots, non-functional instruments, dubious maintenance records and falsified log books. The report concluded "The timid approach to enforcement which Transport Canada is perceived to have adopted is an ineffectual deterrent that has nurtured unsatisfactory aviation safety standards."

He was admonished by his boss at Transport Canada, but the report later leaked to the press. This caused enough anguish within Transport Canada that an inquiry was launched, the Dublin Commission on Aviation Safety. This led to sweeping changes in the airline industry and the eventual creation of an independent safety board, the Transportation Safety Board of Canada.

== Personal life ==
Carswell retired in 1988 and moved to Washago, Ontario where he wrote about his wartime experiences in his book, Over the Wire. They returned to Toronto in 2002 and he began volunteering at the Sunnybrook Veterans Centre. He later lived at the centre. Carswell died in July 2021.

Carswell's grandnephew is professional footballer Sondre Solholm Johansen.
