= Robert Carswell =

Robert Carswell may refer to:

- Robert Carswell, Baron Carswell (1934–2023), British law lord
- Robert Carswell (cricketer) (1936–2022), New Zealand cricketer
- Robert Carswell (MP) for Wallingford (UK Parliament constituency)
- Robert Carswell (pathologist) (1793–1857), the first illustrator of Multiple Sclerosis
- Robert Carswell (American football) (born 1978)
- Robert Corteen Carswell (born 1950), Manx language and culture activist
