= RAF Bury St Edmunds =

Former RAF station in Suffolk, England

RAF Bury St Edmunds USAAF Station 468
- Near Bury St Edmunds, Suffolk in England
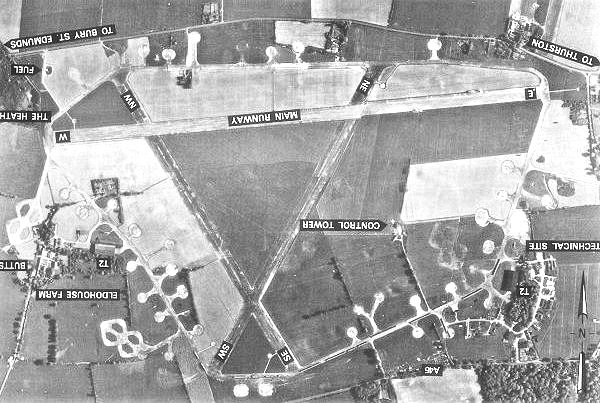
- Bury St Edmunds/Rougham Airfield - 6 June 1955

Site information
- Type: Royal Air Force station
- Code: BU
- Owner: Air Ministry
- Controlled by: Royal Air Force; United States Army Air Forces

Location
- Shown within Suffolk
- Coordinates: 52°14′39″N 000°45′44″E

Site history
- Built: 1941
- In use: 1942–1948
- Events: European Theatre of World War II; Air Offensive, Europe July 1942 – May 1945

Airfield information
- Elevation: 63 metres (207 ft) AMSL
Runways
Direction	Length and surface
03/21	1,170 metres (3,839 ft) concrete
08/26	1,745 metres (5,725 ft) concrete
14/32	1,260 metres (4,134 ft) concrete

Royal Air Force Bury St Edmunds or simply RAF Bury St Edmunds is a former Royal Air Force station located 3 miles (4.8 km) east of Bury St Edmunds, Suffolk, England. It is not to be confused with the RAF grass strip on the western side of Bury St Edmunds known as RAF Westley, an area now part of the town itself.

The airfield was originally, and is now again, known as Rougham, as it is located north of that village between the A14 and the main railway line between Bury St Edmunds and Ipswich.

== History ==
It was built during 1941 and 1942 with three intersecting concrete runways. The main runway of 2,000 yards was aligned approximately E–W. It saw extensive use during the Second World War.

The following units were here at some point:

- 94th Bombardment Group
- 322nd Bombardment Group
- 331st Bombardment Squadron
- 332nd Bombardment Squadron
- 333rd Bombardment Squadron
- 410th Bombardment Squadron

== Current use ==
With the end of military control, Bury St Edmunds airfield's concreted areas were broken up, with most of the site being returned to agriculture.

The old technical site has been developed into the Rougham Industrial Estate. The T2 hangars are still in use for storage. The control tower, used for many years as a private dwelling, has been restored and is operated as an aviation museum dedicated to the 94th bomb group. The museum is open to the public every Sunday from Easter until October, with free admission.

The museum site is also home to the Bury St Edmunds Amateur Radio Society BSEARS radio club.

The airfield was closed in June 2023.

== See also ==
- List of former Royal Air Force stations
