= 410th Bombardment Squadron =

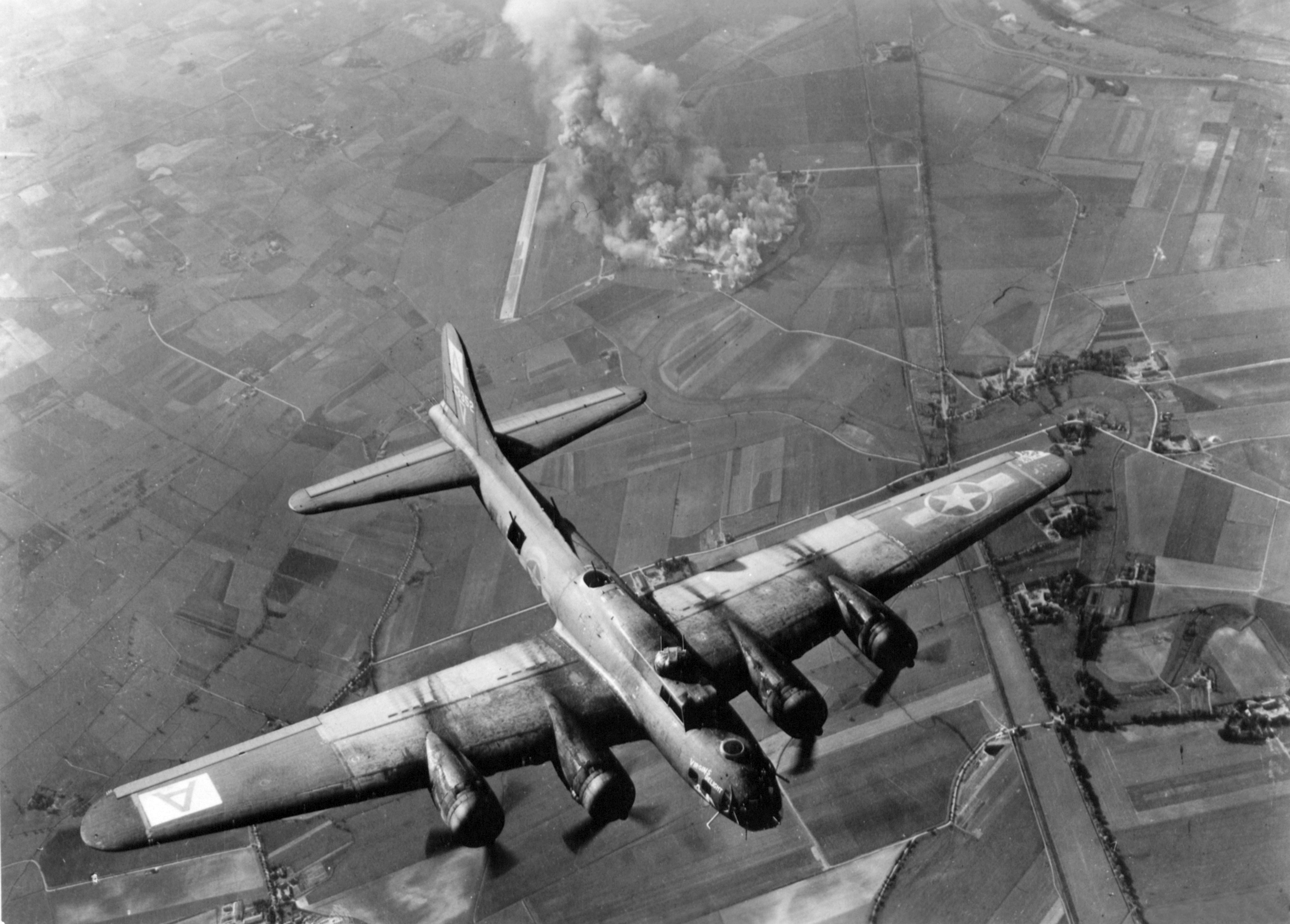
- Squadron B-17 Flying Fortress (Note: Aircraft is Douglas built Boeing B-17F-50-DL Flying Fortress, serial 42-3352, Virgin's Delight during raid on Marienberg, Germany. This plane was shot down by fighters and crashed into the North Sea off the coast of Germany on 29 November 1943, on a mission to Bremen, Germany. Eight killed in action, two prisoners of war. Missing Air Crew Report 1186)
- Active: 1942–1945; 1947–1951
- Country: United States
- Branch: United States Air Force
- Role: Strategic bomber
- Engagements: European Theater of Operations
- Decorations: Distinguished Unit Citation

Insignia
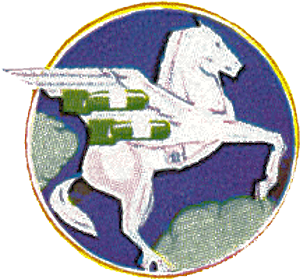
- 410th Bombardment Squadron emblem (Note: Approved 16 April 1943. Description: On a blue disc, within a border orange, piped white, a stylized Pegasus having two light green aerial bombs strapped on under side of wings in front of two light blue-green cloud formations in dexter base.)
- World War II fuselage code: GL

The 410th Bombardment Squadron is an inactive United States Air Force unit, formerly assigned to the 94th Bombardment Group. It was inactivated at Dobbins Air Force Base, Georgia on 20 March 1951 after being called to active duty for the Korean War, with its personnel used as "fillers" to bring other units up to strength.

The squadron was constituted in 1942 as the 20th Reconnaissance Squadron, but was redesignated the 410th Bombardment Squadron before activating in June 1942. After training in the United States, the squadron deployed to the European Theater of Operations in the spring of 1943. It participated in the strategic bombing campaign against Germany until V-E Day, earning two Distinguished Unit Citations for its actions. It returned to the United States in December 1945, and was inactivated at the Port of Embarkation.

The squadron was reactivated in the reserves in 1947, but was not fully manned or equipped.

== History ==
=== World War II ===
==== Initial organization and training ====
The squadron was constituted as the 20th Reconnaissance Squadron in January 1942. However, before it was organized the Army Air Forces (AAF) ended the organization of heavy bomber units with an assigned or attached reconnaissance squadron. The squadron was activated at MacDill Field, Florida, on 15 June 1942 as the 410th Bombardment Squadron, one of the original squadrons of the 94th Bombardment Group. The AAF had decided to concentrate training of heavy bomber units under Second Air Force, and the squadron moved to Pendleton Field, Oregon, one of that command's bases, two weeks later to begin training with the Boeing B-17 Flying Fortress.

The squadron cadre received its initial training at Pendleton. It moved to different bases for Phase I (individual training) and Phase II (crew training), completing Phase III (unit training) at Pueblo Army Air Base, Colorado. The air echelon of the squadron began ferrying their aircraft to the European Theater of Operations around the first of April 1943. The ground echelon left Pueblo on 18 April for Camp Kilmer, New Jersey and the New York Port of Embarkation on 18 April. They sailed aboard the RMS Queen Elizabeth on 5 May, arriving in Scotland on 13 May.

==== Combat in the European Theater ====
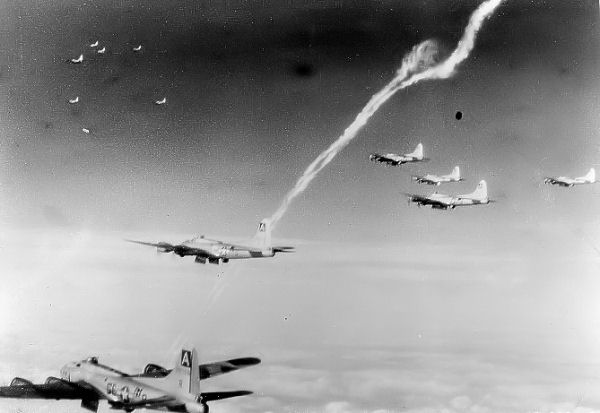
squadron B-17s on a mission over Europe

The squadron began assembling at RAF Earls Colne in mid May, but Eighth Air Force decided to transfer its new Martin B-26 Marauder units from VIII Bomber Command to VIII Air Support Command and concentrate them on bases closer to the European continent. As a result, the 323d Bombardment Group moved to Earls Colne on 14 June, forcing the 94th Group and its squadrons to relocate to RAF Bury St. Edmunds, which would be its combat station for the rest of the war. It flew its first combat mission (and what would be its only mission from Earls Colne) on 13 June against the airfield at Saint-Omer, France. Until the end of the war, the squadron participated in the strategic bombing campaign against Germany. It attacked port facilities at Saint Nazaire, shipyards at Kiel, an aircraft plant at Kassel, oil facilities at Merseburg and ball bearing facilities at Eberhausen.

During an attack on the Messerschmitt factory at Regensberg on 17 August 1943, the squadron was without escort after its escorting Republic P-47 Thunderbolts reached the limit of their range. It withstood repeated attacks, first by enemy Messerschmitt Bf 109 and Focke-Wulf Fw 190 interceptors, then by Messerschmitt Bf 110 and Junkers Ju 88 night fighters, to strike its target, earning its first Distinguished Unit Citation (DUC). This was a "shuttle" mission, with the squadron recovering on bases in North Africa, rather than returning to England.

On 11 January 1944, it attacked a Messerschmitt aircraft parts manufacturing plant at Brunswick/Waggum Airfield. Weather conditions deteriorated during the flight to the target, preventing part of the escorting fighters from reaching the bombers and resulting in the squadron's bombers being recalled. However, the wing leader was unable to authenticate the recall message and continued to the target. In contrast, fair weather to the east of the target permitted the Luftwaffe to concentrate its fighter defenses into one of its largest defensive formations since October 1943. Despite heavy flak in the target area, the squadron bombed accurately and earned its second DUC for this action. The squadron participated in Big Week, the concentrated campaign against the German aircraft manufacturing industry from 20 to 25 February 1944. It bombed transportation, communication and petroleum industrial targets during Operation Lumberjack the final push across the Rhine and into Germany.

The squadron was occasionally diverted from its strategic mission to perform air support and interdiction missions. In the preparation for Operation Overlord, the invasion of Normandy, it flew Operation Crossbow attacks on V-1 flying bomb and V-2 rocket launch sites. On D-Day, it attacked enemy positions near the beachhead. It attacked enemy troops and artillery batteries during Operation Cobra, the breakout at Saint Lo in July 1944, and at Brest, France the following month. It attacked marshalling yards, airfields and strong points near the battlefield during the Battle of the Bulge in late December 1944 through early January 1945.

The squadron flew its last mission on 21 April 1945. Following V-E Day it dropped leaflets to displaced persons and German civilians on what were called "Nickling" flights. The squadron was scheduled to be part of the occupation forces, but those plans were cancelled in September 1945. Starting in November, its planes were transferred to other units or flown back to the United States. Its remaining personnel sailed on the SS Lake Champlain on 12 December 1945. Upon reaching the Port of Embarkation, the squadron was inactivated.

=== Air reserve ===
The squadron was again activated under Air Defense Command (ADC) at Greenville Army Air Base, South Carolina in July 1947 as an air reserve unit and again assigned to the 94th Bombardment Group, which was stationed at Marietta Army Air Field, Georgia. Although nominally a very heavy bomber unit, It is not clear whether or not the squadron was fully staffed or equipped. In 1948 Continental Air Command assumed responsibility for managing reserve and Air National Guard units from ADC. As Greenville was scheduled to go into standby status and as the reserves reorganized under the Wing Base Organization, the squadron moved to join its parent wing at Marietta.

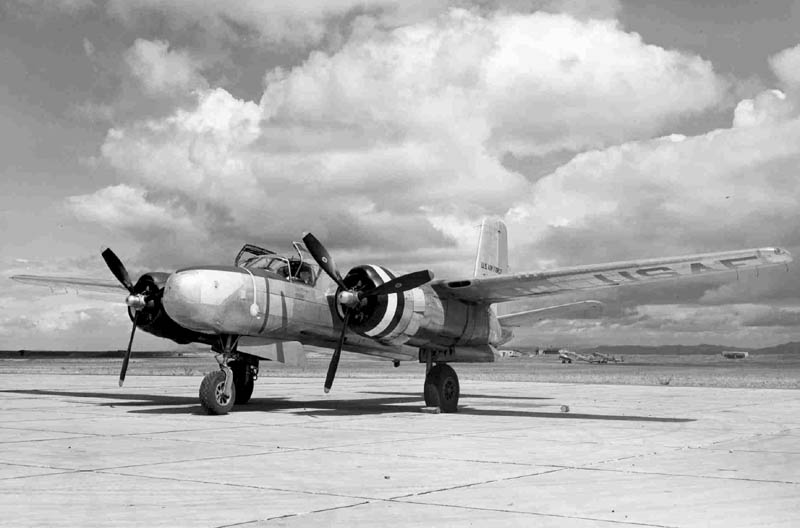
Air reserve B-26

The move came with a redesignation of the squadron as a light bomber unit. Reserve wings were authorized four operational squadrons, rather than the three of active duty wings. However, they were manned at 25% of normal strength. The squadron began to equip with the Douglas B-26 Invader. All reserve combat units were mobilized for the Korean War. The 410th was called to active duty on 10 March 1951. Its personnel and equipment were used to bring other units up to strength, and the squadron was inactivated ten days later.

== Lineage ==
- Constituted as the 20th Reconnaissance Squadron (Heavy) on 28 January 1942

Redesignated 410th Bombardment Squadron (Heavy) on 22 April 1942
Activated on 15 June 1942
Redesignated 410th Bombardment Squadron, Heavy on 20 August 1943
Inactivated on 19 December 1945

- Redesignated 410th Bombardment Squadron, Very Heavy on 3 July 1947

Activated in the reserve on 17 July 1947
Redesignated 410th Bombardment Squadron, Light on 26 June 1949.
Ordered to active service on 10 March 1951
Inactivated on 20 March 1951

=== Assignments ===
- 94th Bombardment Group, 15 June 1942 – 19 December 1945
- 94th Bombardment Group, 17 July 1947 – 20 March 1951

=== Stations ===
- MacDill Field, Florida, 15 June 1942
- Pendleton Field, Oregon, 29 June 1942
- Davis-Monthan Field, Arizona, 29 August 1942
- Biggs Field, Texas, 1 November 1942
- Pueblo Army Air Base, Colorado, 3 January – 17 April 1943
- RAF Earls Colne (AAF-358), England, c. 11 May 1943
- RAF Bury St. Edmunds (AAF-468), England, c. 13 June 1943 – 11 December 1945
- Camp Kilmer, New Jersey, 17–19 December 1945
- Greenville Army Air Base, South Carolina, 17 July 1947
- Marietta Air Force Base (later Dobbins Air Force Base), Georgia, 26 June 1949 – 20 March 1951

=== Aircraft ===
- Boeing B-17 Flying Fortress, 1942–1945
- Douglas B-26 Invader, 1949–1951

=== Awards and campaigns ===
| Award streamer | Award | Dates | Notes |
|---|---|---|---|
| | Distinguished Unit Citation | 17 August 1943 | Regensberg |
| | Distinguished Unit Citation | 11 January 1944 | Brunswick |

| Campaign Streamer | Campaign | Dates | Notes |
|---|---|---|---|
| | Air Offensive, Europe | 11 May 1943 – 5 June 1944 | |
| | Air Combat, EAME Theater | 11 May 1943 – 11 May 1945 | |
| | Normandy | 6 June 1944 – 24 July 1944 | |
| | Northern France | 25 July 1944 – 14 September 1944 | |
| | Rhineland | 15 September 1944 – 21 March 1945 | |
| | Ardennes-Alsace | 16 December 1944 – 25 January 1945 | |
| | Central Europe | 22 March 1944 – 21 May 1945 | |

== See also ==
- B-17 Flying Fortress units of the United States Army Air Forces
- List of A-26 Invader operators
