= RAF Great Ashfield =

Former Royal Air Force station in Suffolk, England

RAF Great Ashfield RAF Elmswell USAAF Station 155
- Located near Bury St Edmunds, Suffolk, United Kingdom
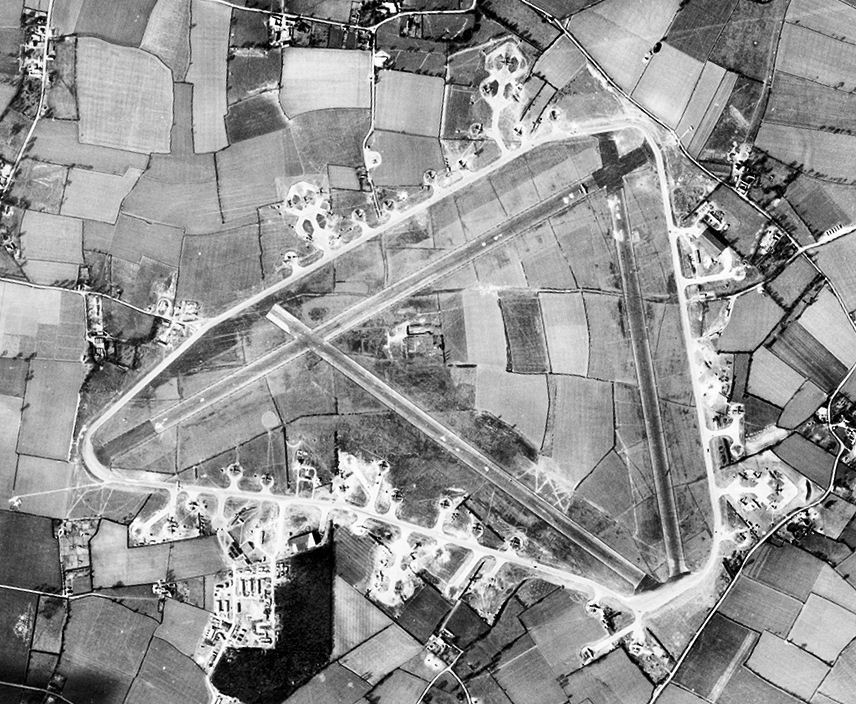
- Aerial photograph of Great Ashfield airfield 31 March 1944. Note the large number of 385th Bomb Group B-17s on hardstands parked around the Perimeter Track

Site information
- Type: Royal Air Force station
- Code: GA ?
- Controlled by: United States Army Air Forces

Location
- Map showing the location of RAF Great Ashfield within Suffolk
- Coordinates: 52°15′20″N 000°56′37″E

Site history
- Built: 1942
- In use: 1943-1955
- Battles/wars: European Theatre of World War II; Air Offensive, Europe July 1942 - May 1945

Garrison information
- Garrison: Eighth Air Force
- Occupants: 385th Bombardment Group

Royal Air Force Great Ashfield or more simply RAF Great Ashfield is a former Royal Air Force station in Suffolk, England. It is located 10 miles (16 km) east of Bury St Edmunds and 2 miles (3.2 km) south of Great Ashfield.

It was originally a Royal Flying Corps grass landing strip in World War I and, before the United States Army Air Forces (USAAF) arrived, the RAF had been using it for training; during that period it was known as RAF Elmswell. The airfield is now used for agriculture, with no aviation activities remaining.

== United States Army Air Forces use ==
Great Ashfield was re-built for the USAAF in 1942 and assigned designation Station 155. The first aircraft to land on the station is believed to have been a battle-damaged Martin B-26 Marauder returning from a raid over the Netherlands on 17 May 1943.

USAAF Station Units assigned to RAF Great Ashfield were:

- 455th Sub-Depot
- 18th Weather Squadron
- 31st Station Complement Squadron

Regular Army Station Units included:

- 1152nd Quartermaster Company
- 1249th Military Police Company
- 1735th Ordnance Supply & Maintenance Company
- 877th Chemical Company (Air Operations)
- 2036th Engineer Fire Fighting Platoon

=== 385th Bombardment Group (Heavy) ===
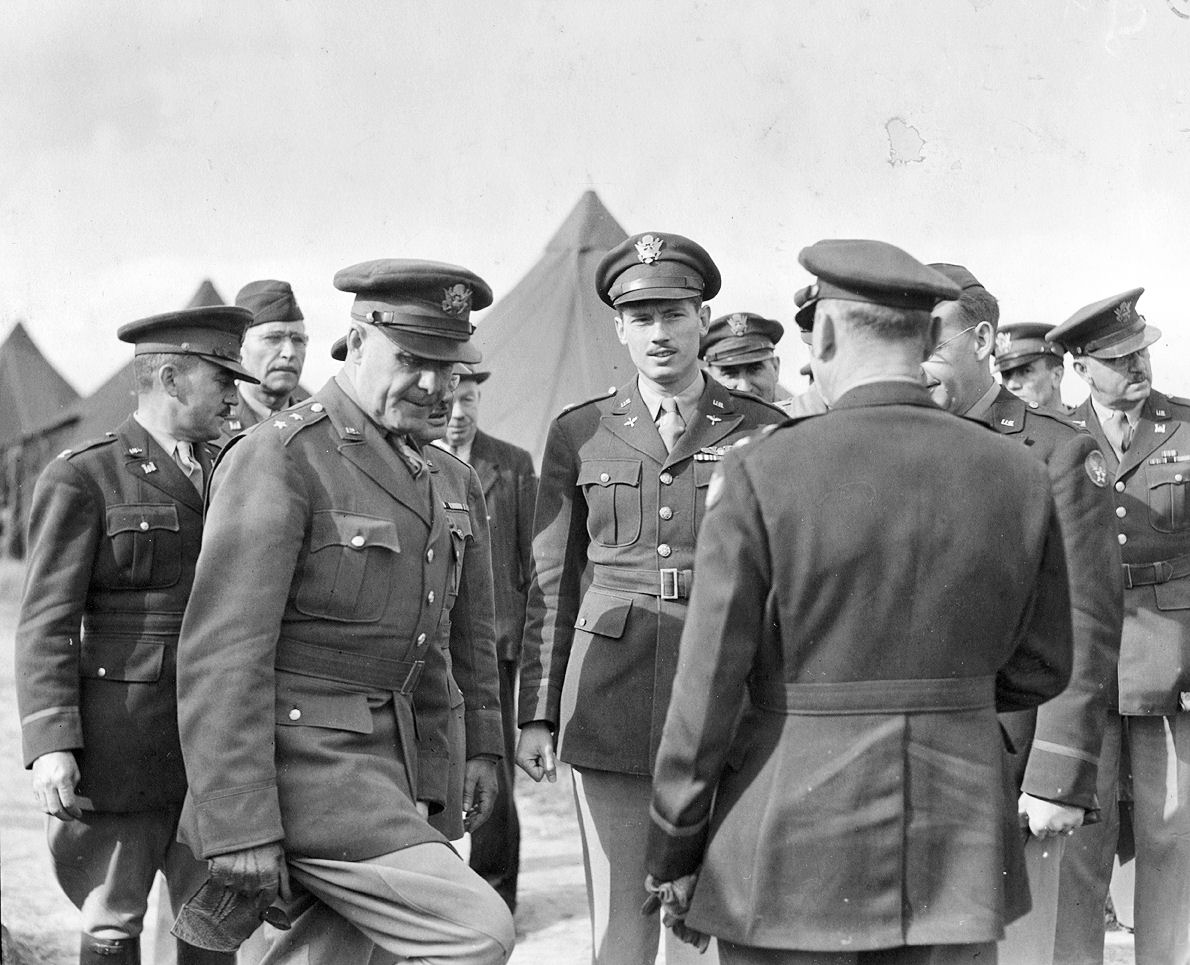
General Ira C Eaker and General Lee with Lieutenant-Colonel Elliot Vandevanter Jr, commanding officer of the 385th Bomb Group, during an official visit 28 September 1943

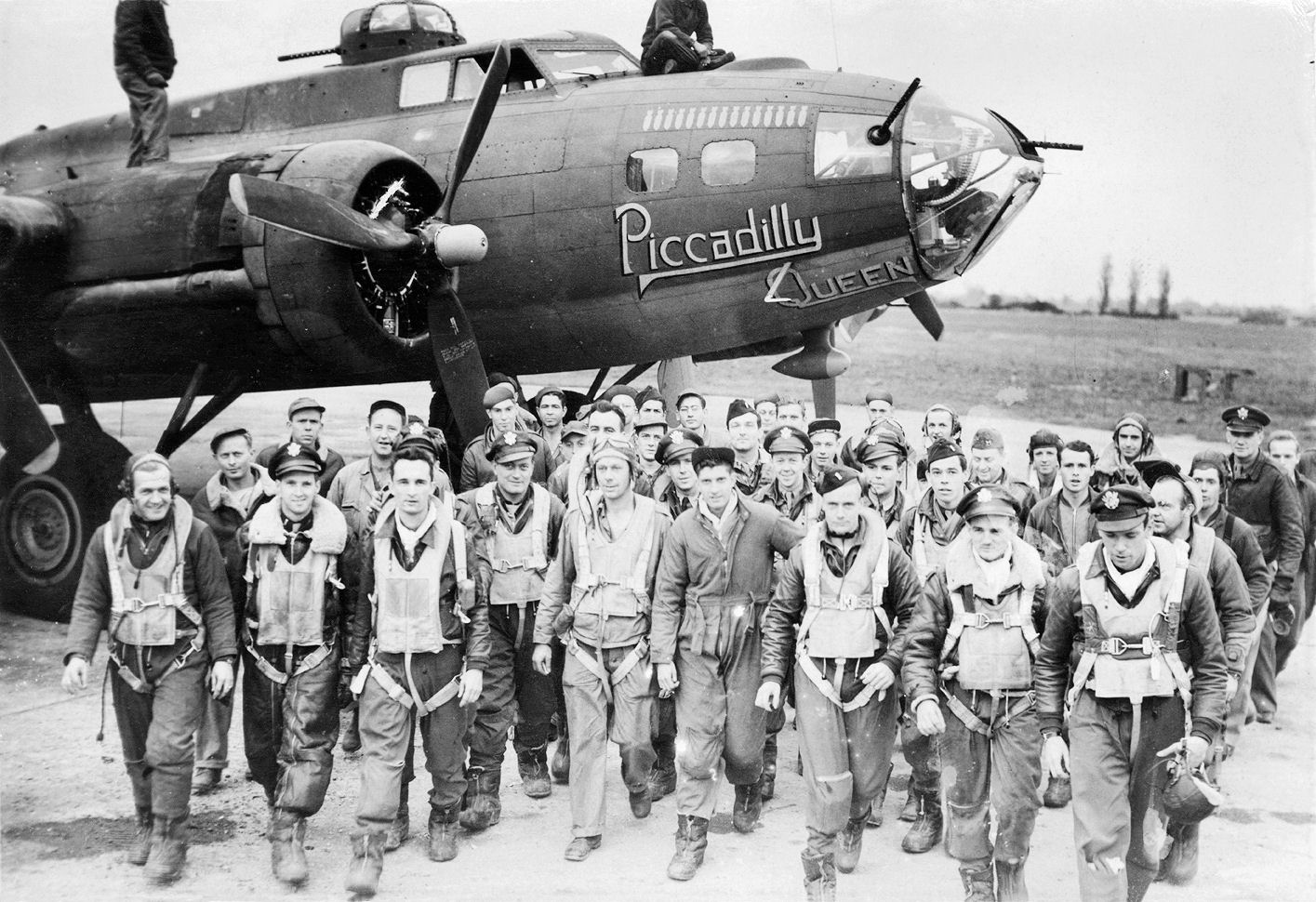
Bomber crews of the 385th Bomb Group return to base following a mission, they walk past a B-17 Flying Fortress (serial number 42-30251) nicknamed "Piccadilly Queen".

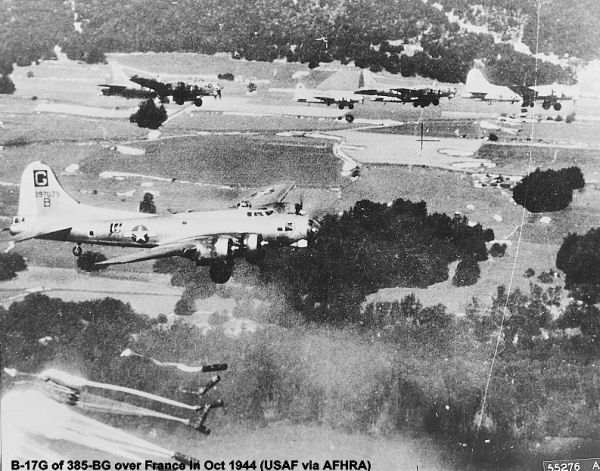
B-17s of the 385th Bomb Group, on a parachute drop over France, October 1944. Boeing B-17G-40-BO Fortress Serial 42-97079 "Dozy Doats" visible in foreground.

The airfield was opened on 19 June 1943 and was used by the United States Army Air Forces Eighth Air Force 385th Bombardment Group (Heavy). The 385th arrived from Great Falls AAF Montana and was assigned to the 93d Combat Bombardment Wing. The group tail code was a "Square-G". Its operational squadrons were:

- 548th Bombardment Squadron (GX)
- 549th Bombardment Squadron (XA)
- 550th Bombardment Squadron (SG)
- 551st Bombardment Squadron (HR)

The group flew Boeing B-17 Flying Fortresses as part of the Eighth Air Force's strategic bombing campaign.

The 385th BG operated primarily as a strategic bombardment organization until the war ended, striking such targets as industrial areas, air bases, oil refineries, and communications centres in Germany, France, Poland, Belgium, the Netherlands and Norway. The group received a Distinguished Unit Citation for bombing an aircraft factory at Regensburg on 17 August 1943 after a long hazardous flight over enemy territory.

The group led the 4th Bomb Wing a great distance through heavy and damaging opposition for the successful bombardment of an aircraft repair plant at Zwickau on 12 May 1944, being awarded another DUC for this performance. Other strategic targets included aircraft factories in Oschersleben and Marienburg, battery works in Stuttgart, airfields in Beauvais and Chartres, oil refineries in Ludwigshafen and Merseburg, and marshalling yards in Munich and Oranienburg.

Sometimes supported ground forces and struck interdictory targets. Attacked coastline defences in June 1944 in preparation for the Normandy invasion and hit marshalling yards and choke points during the landing on D-Day. Bombed enemy positions in support of ground forces at Saint-Lô in July 1944. Attacked German communications and fortifications during the Battle of the Bulge, December 1944-January 1945. Bombed troop concentrations and communications centres in Germany and France, March–April 1945, to assist the final thrust into Germany.

On 6 March 1944 raid to Berlin (the most costly mission the Eighth ever carried out) the 3rd Division commander, Brigadier General Russell Wilson, took off from Great Ashfield in a radar-equipped B-17 in a leading group of the 385th. All of the 385th aircraft returned safely ... all that is except the one carrying General Wilson which was seen to take several hits from flak setting one engine on fire. Although four of the crew managed to parachute to safety (including Medal of Honor hero First Lieutenant John C. Morgan), eight of the others were killed when the bomber exploded.

After V-E Day, the 385th Bomb Group hauled prisoners of war from Germany to Allied centres and flew food to the Netherlands. The group returned to Sioux Falls AAF South Dakota on 28 August 1945 and was inactivated.

Legacy

During the Cold War, the United States Air Force 385th Strategic Aerospace Wing, based at Offut AFB Nebraska controlled a mixture of strategic missiles and air refueling aircraft. The wing provided airborne command post services and supported SAC's global air refueling mission.

The wing was active between 1962 and 1964 and was bestowed the World War II legacy and honours of the USAAF 385th Bomb Group upon activation.

== Postwar Royal Air Force use ==
After the war, the airfield reverted to RAF control and it came under Maintenance Command as a sub-site for bomb storage before being finally abandoned and sold in 1955.

== Current use ==
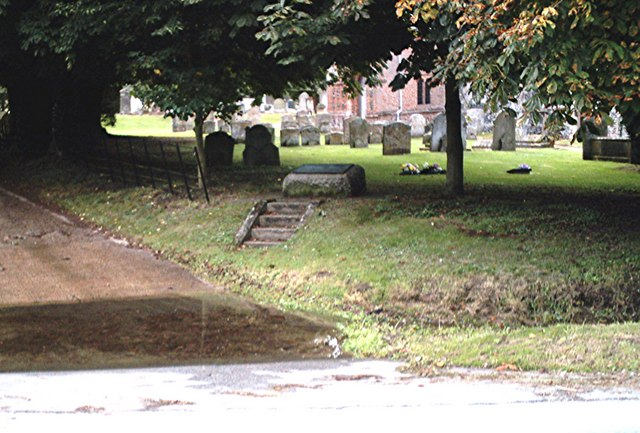
War memorial, Great Ashfield. Across the ford, steps lead up to a simple stone slab with a bronze plaque commemorating the men of the 385th Heavy Bombardment Group of the US Army Air Force who flew B17s out of the then Great Ashfield airfield.

With the end of military control, Great Ashfield was returned to agriculture. Much of the concrete has been removed and sold as aggregate but a small section of the main runway was initially retained for use by civil light aircraft. Much of the perimeter track has been reduced to a single lane farm access road and a few wartime buildings remain in a deteriorated state.

A memorial to those of the 385th who lost their lives flying from Great Ashfield can be seen in the village church.

== See also ==
- List of former Royal Air Force stations
