= 596th Bomb Squadron =

596th Bombardment Squadron
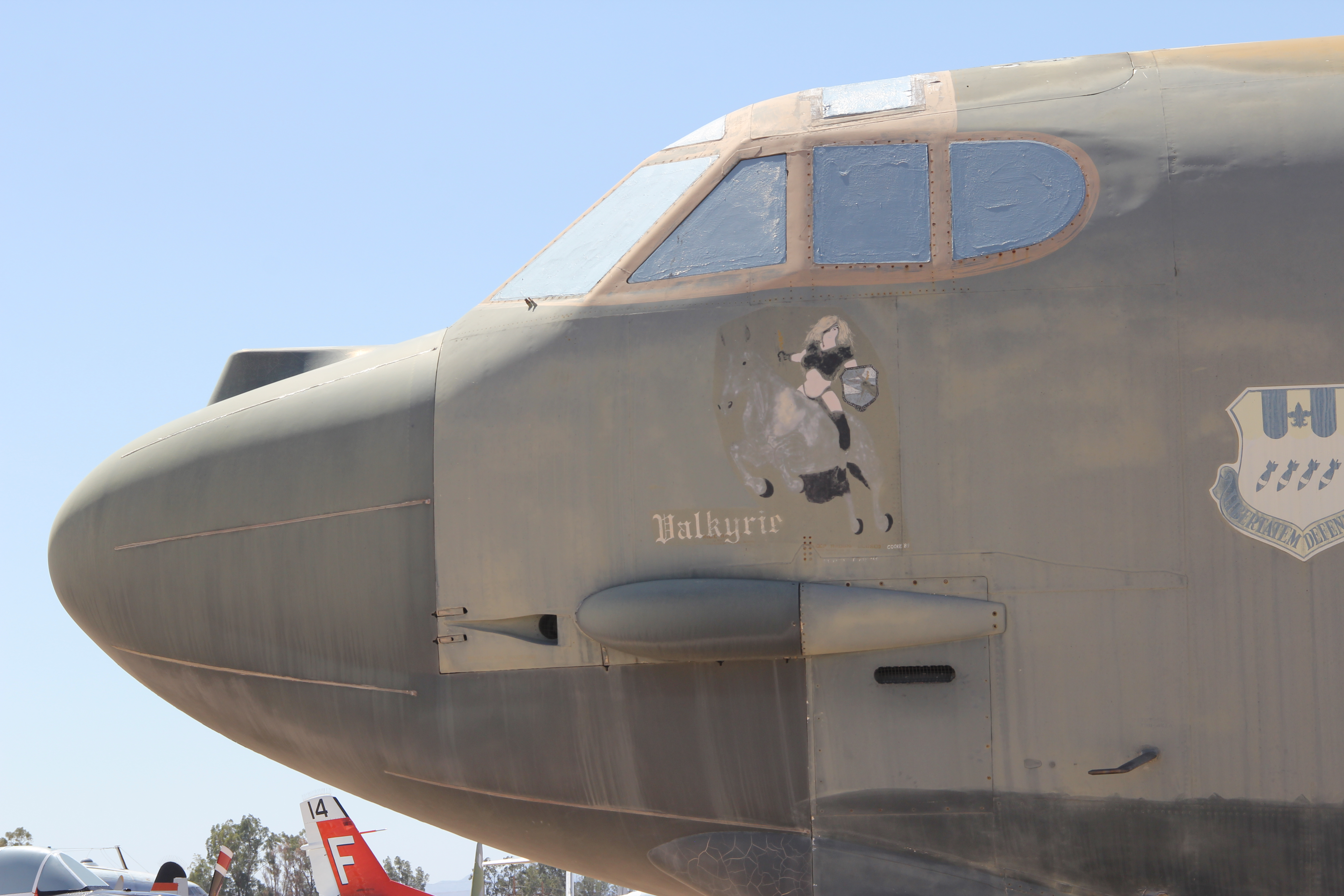
- 596th Squadron Boeing B-52 (Note: Aircraft is Boeing B-52G-95-BW Stratofortress serial 58-0183 Valkyrie. This is one of seven B-52s that flew on "Secret Squirrel" on the first night of Desert Storm. It was retired to the Aerospace Maintenance and Regeneration Center less than six months later on 9 July 1991, and was later put on display at the Pima Air Museum. Baugher, Joe (21 April 2023). "1958 USAF Serial Numbers". Joe Baugher.)
- Active: 1943–1945; 1963–1993
- Country: United States
- Branch: United States Air Force
- Role: Bombardment
- Motto: Excalibur
- Engagements: European Theater of Operations; Gulf War
- Decorations: Distinguished Unit Citation; Air Force Outstanding Unit Award

Insignia
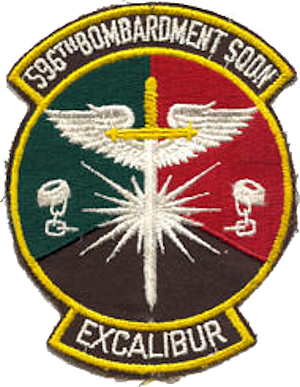
- Patch with 596th Bomb Squadron emblem (Note: Approved 20 March 1945. Description: On a disc trisected red, brown, and green, trisection angle starting from vertical division line at top, a silver winged sword with gold hilt, guard and pommel palewise, striking with impact mark of eight white rays on either side, and cleaving shackle chains fastened to silver slave bracelets, one to dexter, one to sinister, all within a white border, edged golden orange.)
- World War II group tail marking: Yellow diagonal stripe
- World War II squadron fuselage code: X2

The 596th Bomb Squadron is an inactive United States Air Force unit. It was last assigned to the 2d Operations Group at Barksdale Air Force Base, Louisiana, where it was inactivated on 1 October 1993, and its resources transferred to another unit.

The squadron was first activated in April 1943 as the 596th Bombardment Squadron and equipped with Martin B-26 Marauders. It departed for the European Theater of Operations in the spring of 1944. From bases in England, and later on the European continent, it participated in combat until late April 1945, and was awarded a Distinguished Unit Citation for its actions. It remained in Europe after V-E Day until the end of 1945, when it returned to the United States and was inactivated at the Port of Embarkation.

The squadron was again activated in February 1963, when it assumed the personnel and Boeing B-52 Stratofortresses of another unit at Dow Air Force Base, Maine. It stood alert and flew training missions until 1968, when Dow closed and it moved to Barksdale Air Force Base, Louisiana. It participated in the longest strike mission in history at the start of Desert Storm, flying from Barksdale to its launch position near Iraq.

== History ==
=== World War II ===
The squadron was established at MacDill Field, Florida in April 1943 as one of the original squadrons of the 397th Bombardment Group, a Martin B-26 Marauder medium bomber group. It drew its initial cadre from the 21st Bombardment Group. The squadron trained under Third Air Force at stations in the southeastern United States. After completing its training by participating in the Tennessee Maneuvers, the squadron departed Hunter Field, Georgia for the European Theater of Operations on 13 March 1944.

The squadron was temporarily stationed at RAF Gosfield upon its arrival in England in early April 1944. On the 15th of the month, its parent group displaced the 363d Fighter Group at RAF Rivenhall and the unit flew its first combat mission five days later. In preparation for Operation Overlord, the invasion of Normandy, the squadron participated in Operation Crossbow, attacking V-1 flying bomb launch pads. It also struck bridges, coastal defenses, marshalling yards and airfields in northern France. On D-Day the squadron attacked strong points and bombed fuel dumps and other objectives to support ground forces throughout the Normandy Campaign.

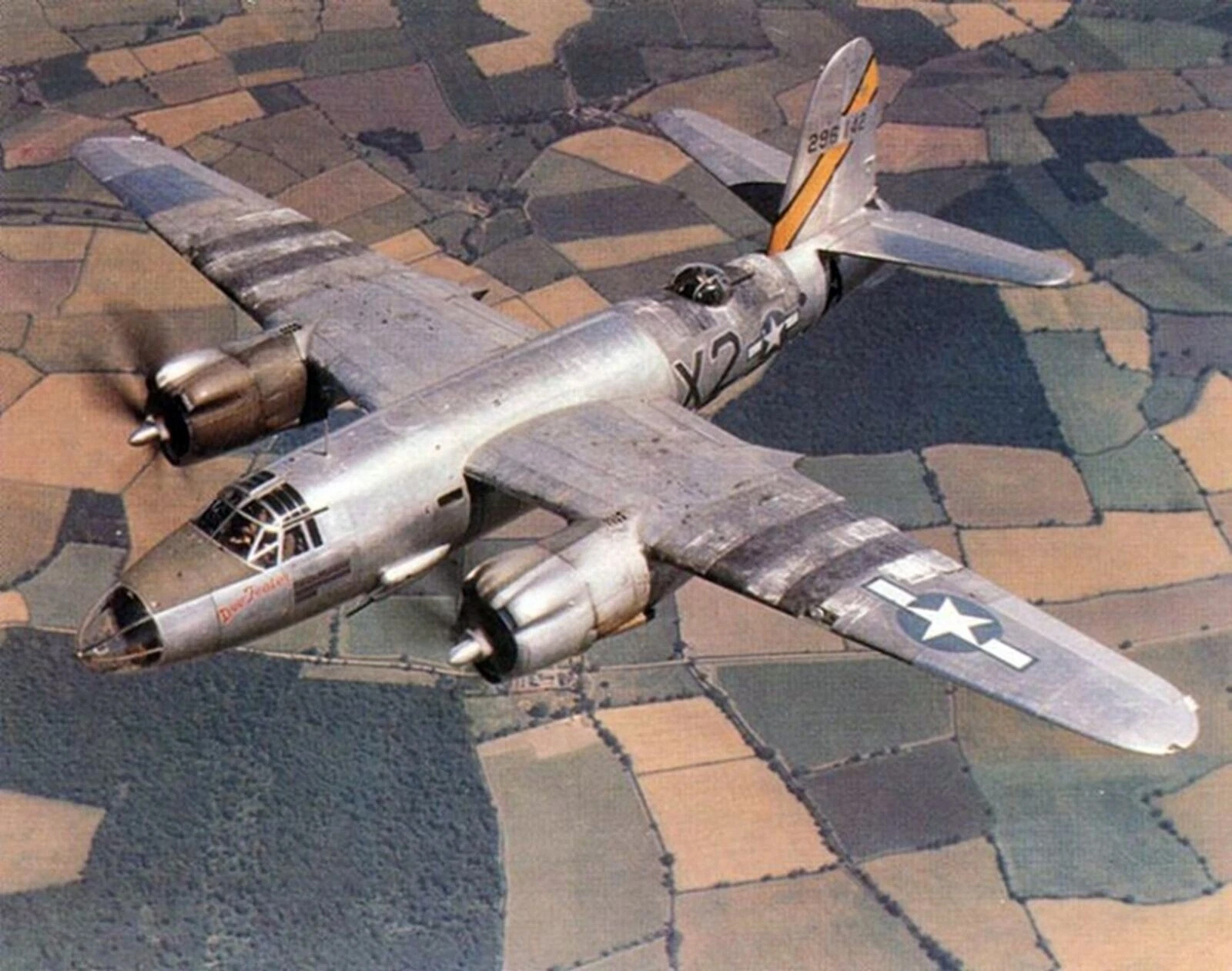
596th Bombardment Squadron B-26 (Note: Aircraft is B-26B-55-MA Marauder, serial 42-96142, Dee-Feater, fuseage code X2-A.)

In July 1944, the squadron participated in Operation Cobra, attacking German forces near Saint Lo, France, during the Allied breakout there. In August, the squadron moved from England to Gorges Airfield, an Advanced Landing Ground in France. From there it attacked naval targets at Saint Malo and Brest. Once on the Continent, the squadron made frequent moves forward as the Allied forces advanced during the Northern France Campaign. By September the squadron began flying missions into Germany, attacking depots and defended areas.

During the Battle of the Bulge, the squadron struck enemy lines of communication. On 23 December 1944 the unit severed a railway bridge at Ediger-Eller, Germany, despite heavy flak and fighter opposition from the Luftwaffe. For this action it was awarded a Distinguished Unit Citation. The squadron continued to fly missions to support the Allied drive into Germany until 20 April 1945, exactly one year after its first combat mission, having completed 239 combat missions.

After V-E Day the squadron returned to its former base at Peronne Airfield, France, and remained there until December, when it returned to the United States. Upon arrival at Camp Shanks, New York in early January 1946, the squadron was inactivated.

=== B-52 operations ===
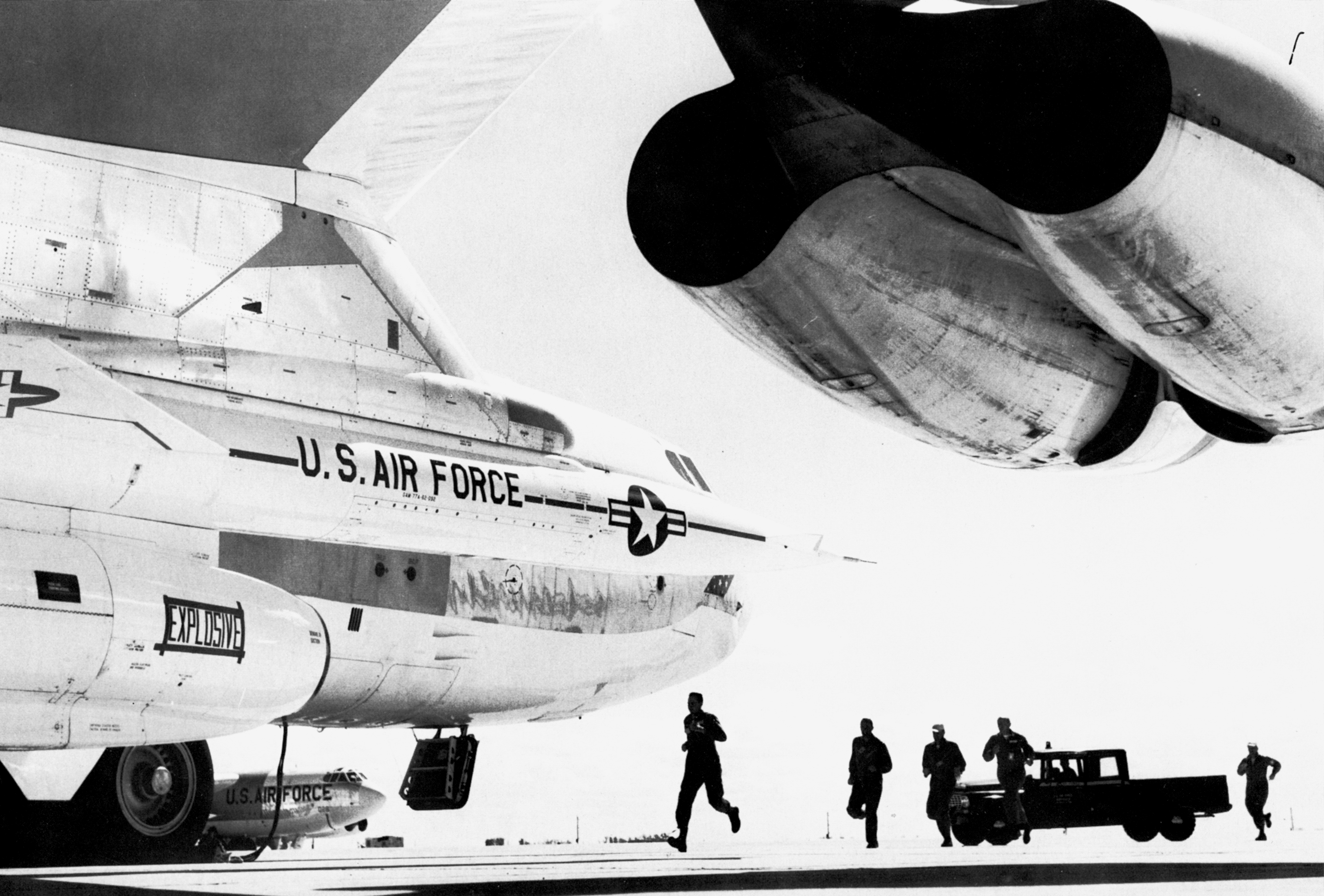
B-52G on nuclear alert

Starting in the late 1950s, Strategic Air Command (SAC) dispersed its Boeing B-52 Stratofortress bombers over a larger number of bases, thus making it more difficult for the Soviet Union to knock out the entire fleet with a surprise first strike. SAC established "Strategic Wings" to command this dispersed fleet. however, these wings were Major Command controlled (MAJCON) units and could not carry a permanent history or lineage. SAC received authority to replace its strategic wings that were equipped with combat aircraft with Air Force controlled (AFCON) units, which could carry a lineage and history. As part of this program, in February 1963, the 397th Bombardment Wing replaced the 4038th Strategic Wing at Dow Air Force Base, Maine. In this reorganization the 596th was reactivated and assumed the personnel, mission, and Boeing B-52G Stratofortresses of the 341st Bombardment Squadron, which was simultaneously inactivated. (Note: While this action was almost tantamount to redesignation, they were not official redesignations." The Development of the Strategic Air Command 1946-1986, Office of the Historian, Headquarters Strategic Air Command, Offutt AFB, NE, pp. 117-118.)

It carried out operational training missions with the 397th Wing at Dow. Half of the squadron's aircraft were maintained on fifteen minute alert, fully fueled and ready for combat to reduce vulnerability to a Soviet missile strike. The squadron continued to maintain an alert commitment until President Bush terminated the alert program at the end of the Cold War. SAC also maintained an airborne force for "airborne alert training" (Operation Chrome Dome) and the squadron was periodically tasked for this mission. Accidents at Palomares in January 1966 and Thule in January 1968 contributed to the end of Chrome Dome, as did rapidly rising costs of the programs and the use of strategic bombers for non-nuclear missions, but the primary reason was the availability of a survivable intercontinental ballistic missile force.

In April 1968, the 397th Wing was inactivated in preparation for the turnover of Dow to the Maine Air National Guard. The squadron moved to Barksdale Air Force Base, Louisiana where it was assigned to the 2d Bombardment Wing. Although the squadron did not participate in the Vietnam War as a unit, it deployed personnel and aircraft to participate in operations in Southeast Asia, including Operation Linebacker. For a year and a half, from the end of May 1972 until late October 1973, the squadron was not operational due to these deployments.

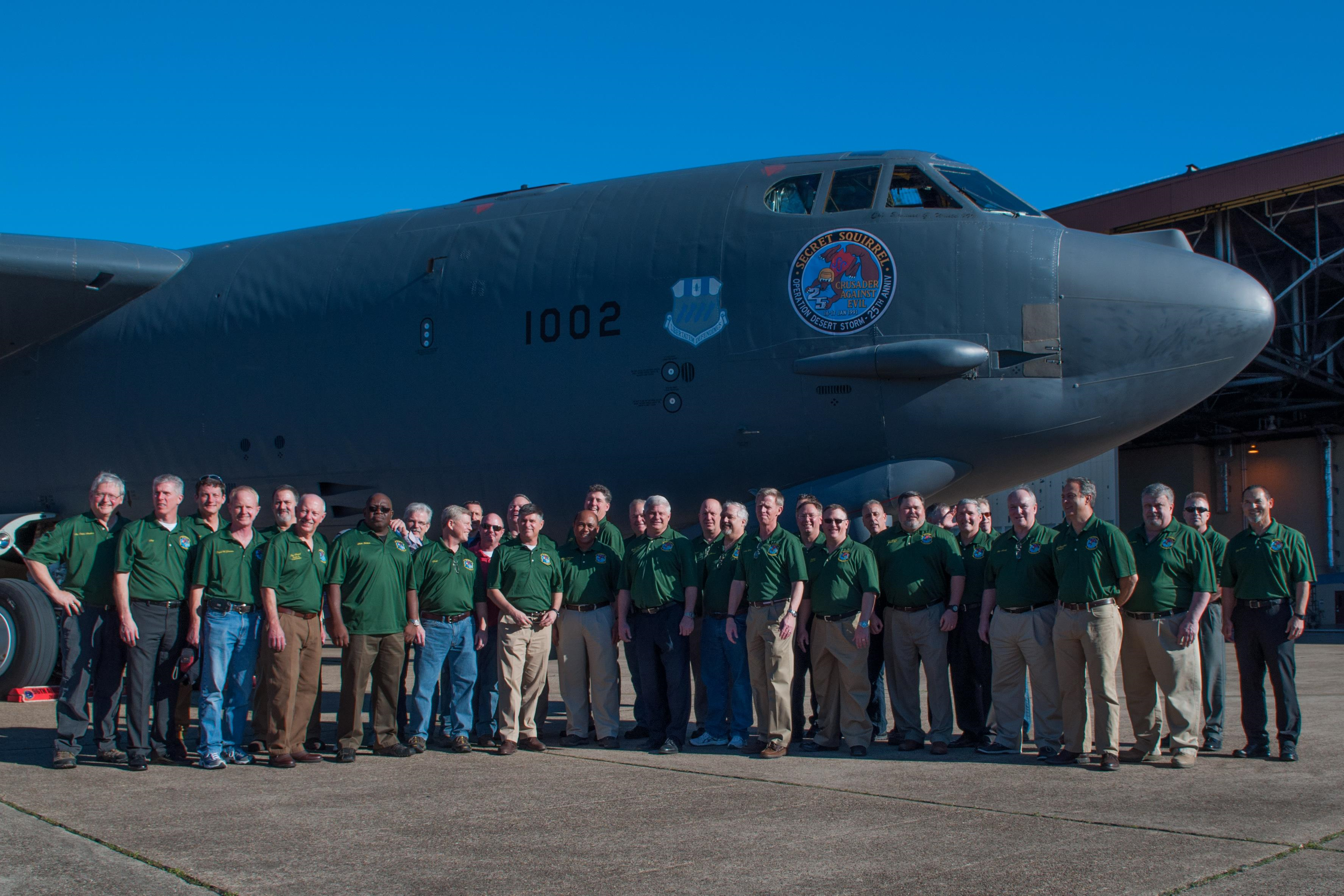
Operation Secret Squirrel 25th Reunion

The squadron deployed aircraft and personnel to the 801st Bombardment Wing (Provisional), Morón Air Base, Spain and augmented the 1708th Bombardment Wing, Provisional at Prince Abdullah Air Base, Saudi Arabia, from August 1990 to March 1991 in support of Operation Desert Storm. On the first day of the war, elements of the squadron participated in Operation Senior Surprise, (Note: This operation was referred to as "Operation Secret Squirrel" by the participating aircrews.) which was led by the 596th's commander, Lt Col John Beard. Seven squadron bombers launched from Barksdale and struck power and communications targets in Iraq with AGM-86 ALCM missiles, returning to Barksdale 35 hours later.

On 1 September 1991, SAC reorganized its combat wings under the Objective Wing model. The 2nd Operations Group was activated and the 2nd Wing's operational elements were assigned to it. At the same time, the squadron name changed to the 596th Bomb Squadron. The 596th was inactivated and transferred its personnel and equipment to the 96th Bomb Squadron, which was activated in its place on 1 October 1993.

== Lineage ==
- Constituted as the 596th Bombardment Squadron (Medium) on 20 March 1943

Activated on 20 April 1943
Redesignated 596th Bombardment Squadron, Medium c. April 1944
Inactivated on 31 December 1945

- Redesignated 596th Bombardment Squadron, Heavy and activated on 15 November 1962 (not organized)

Organized on 1 February 1963

- Redesignated 596th Bomb Squadron on 1 September 1991
- Inactivated on 1 October 1993

=== Assignments ===
- 397th Bombardment Group, 20 April 1943 – 31 December 1945
- Strategic Air Command, 15 November 1962 (not organized)
- 397th Bombardment Wing, 1 February 1963 (attached to 2d Bombardment Wing after 15 April 1968)
- 2d Bombardment Wing, 25 April 1968
- 2d Operations Group, 1 September 1991 – 1 October 1993

=== Stations ===
- MacDill Field, Florida, 20 April 1943
- Avon Park Army Air Field, Florida, 14 October 1943
- Hunter Field, Georgia, 1 November 1943 – 13 March 1944
- RAF Gosfield (Station 154), England, 5 April 1944
- RAF Rivenhall (Station 168), England, 15 April 1944
- RAF Hurn (AAF-492), England, 4 August 1944
- Gorges Airfield (A-26), France, 30 August 1944
- Dreux/Vernouillet Airfield (A-41), France, c. 16 September 1944
- Peronne Airfield (A-72), France, c. 8 October 1944
- Venlo Airfield (Y-55), Netherlands, 25 April 1945
- Peronne Airfield (A-72), France, 30 May – c. December 1945
- Camp Kilmer, New Jersey, 30 – 31 December 1945
- Dow Air Force Base, Maine, 1 February 1963
- Barksdale Air Force Base, Louisiana, 25 April 1968 – 1 October 1993

=== Awards and campaigns ===
Award streamer	Award	Dates	Notes
	Distinguished Unit Citation	23 December 1944 Germany	596th Bombardment Squadron
	Air Force Outstanding Unit Award	1 July 1986–30 June 1987	596th Bombardment Squadron
	Air Force Outstanding Unit Award	1 July 1987–30 June 1989	596th Bombardment Squadron

Campaign Streamer	Campaign	Dates	Notes
	Air Offensive, Europe	5 April 1944 – 5 June 1944	596th Bombardment Squadron
	Normandy	6 June 1944 – 24 July 1944	596th Bombardment Squadron
	Northern France	25 July 1944 – 14 September 1944	596th Bombardment Squadron
	Rhineland	15 September 1944 – 21 March 1945	596th Bombardment Squadron
	Ardennes-Alsace	16 December 1944 – 25 January 1945	596th Bombardment Squadron
	Central Europe	5 April 1944 – 21 May 1945	596th Bombardment Squadron
	Defense of Saudi Arabia	2 August 1990–16 January 1991	596th Bombardment Squadron (Note: The Southwest Asia awards were made to the 2nd Bombardment Wing.)
	Liberation and Defense of Kuwait	17 January 1991–11 April 1991	596th Bombardment Squadron

=== Aircraft ===
- Martin B-26 Marauder, 1943–1945
- Boeing B-52 Stratofortress, 1963–1993

== See also ==
- List of B-52 Units of the United States Air Force
- List of Martin B-26 Marauder operators
