= 597th Bombardment Squadron =

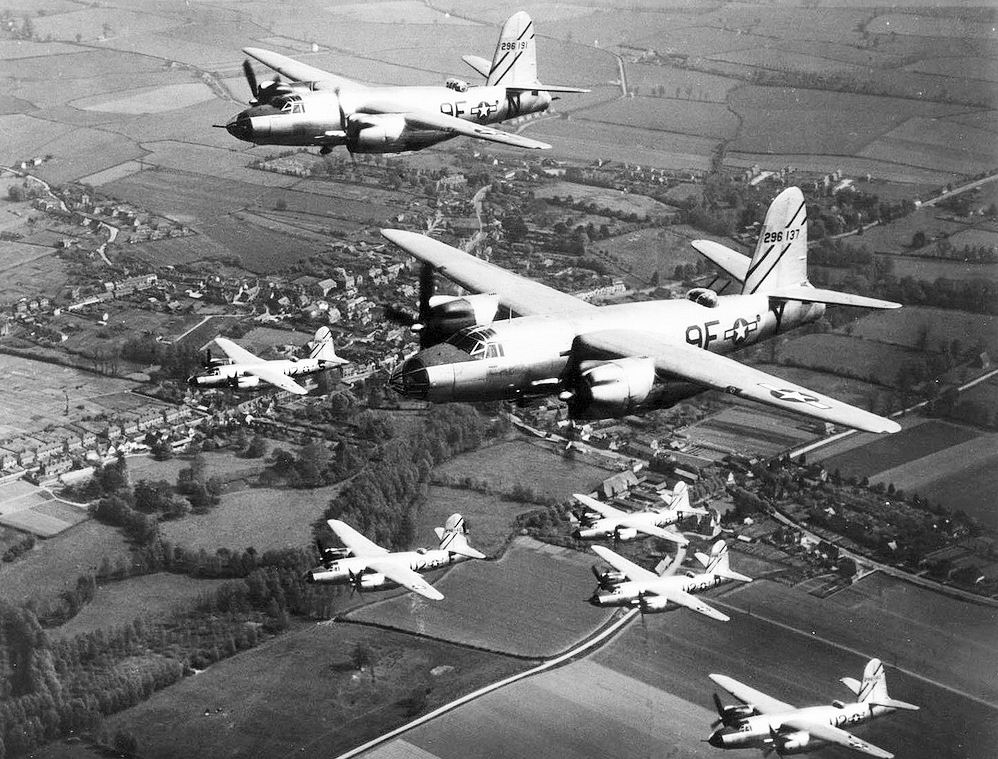
- 397th Group B-26 Marauders (Note: the two closest aircraft are Martin B-26B-55-MA Marauder, serial 42-96137, fuselage code 9F-Y (shot down on 13 May 1944) and Martin B-26B-55-MA Marauder, serial 42-96191, Milk Run Special, fuselage code 9F-N (badly damaged in a landing accident on 25 April 1945) of the 597th. The other B-26s are from the 598th Bombardment Squadron. Baugher, Joe (28 April 2023). "1942 USAF Serial Numbers". Joe Baugher.)
- Active: 1943–1945
- Country: United States
- Branch: United States Air Force
- Role: Medium bomber
- Engagements: European Theater of Operations
- Decorations: Distinguished Unit Citation

Insignia
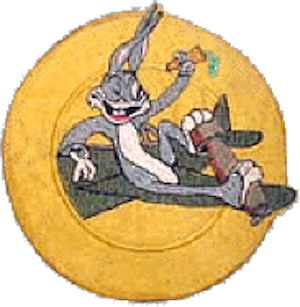
- Patch with 597th Bombardment Squadron emblem (Note: Approved 20 December 1943. Description: Over and through a light yellow disc, "Bugs Bunny" proper seated on the left wing of a caricatured grayed green aircraft, holding aloft a carrot proper with the left forepaw, and shoving a brown and tan aerial bomb off the wing tip with hind feet.)
- Group tail marking: Yellow diagonal stripe
- Squadron fuselage code: 9F

The 597th Bombardment Squadron is an inactive United States Air Force unit. It was activated at MacDill Field, Florida in April 1943. After training in the United States, it transferred to the European Theater of Operations, where it was a component of IX Bomber Command. The squadron served in combat from April 1944 until the end of World War II, earning a Distinguished Unit Citation for an attack on Ediger-Eller, Germany, in December 1944 during the Battle of the Bulge. Following V-E Day the squadron remained in France until December 1945, when it returned to the United States and was inactivated at Camp Shanks in January 1946.

== History ==
The squadron was established at MacDill Field, Florida in April 1943 as one of the original squadrons of the 397th Bombardment Group, a Martin B-26 Marauder medium bomber group. It drew its initial cadre from the 21st Bombardment Group. The squadron trained under Third Air Force at stations in the southeastern United States. After completing its training by participating in the Tennessee Maneuvers, the squadron departed Hunter Field, Georgia for the European Theater of Operations on 14 March 1944.

The squadron was temporarily stationed at RAF Gosfield upon its arrival in England in early April 1944. On the 15th of the month, its parent group displaced the 363d Fighter Group at RAF Rivenhall and flew its first combat mission five days later. In preparation for Operation Overlord, the invasion of Normandy, the squadron participated in Operation Crossbow, attacking V-1 flying bomb launch pads. It also struck bridges, coastal defenses, marshalling yards and airfields in northern France. On D-Day the squadron attacked strong points and bombed fuel dumps and other objectives to support ground forces throughout the Normandy Campaign.

In July 1944, the squadron participated in Operation Cobra, attacking German forces near Saint Lo, France, during the Allied breakout there. In August, the squadron moved from England to Gorges Airfield, an Advanced Landing Ground in France. From there it attacked naval targets at Saint Malo and Brest. Once on the Continent, the squadron made frequent moves forward as the Allied forces advanced during the Northern France Campaign. By September the squadron began flying missions into Germany, attacking depots and defended areas.

During the Battle of the Bulge, the squadron struck enemy lines of communications. On 23 December 1944 the unit severed a railway bridge at Ediger-Eller, Germany, despite heavy flak and fighter opposition from the Luftwaffe. For this action it was awarded a Distinguished Unit Citation. The squadron continued to fly missions to support the Allied drive into Germany until 20 April 1945, exactly one year after its first combat mission, having completed 239 combat missions.

After V-E Day the squadron returned to its former base at Peronne Airfield, France, and remained there until December, when it returned to the United States. Upon arrival at Camp Shanks, New York in early January 1946, the squadron was inactivated.

== Lineage ==
- Constituted as the 597th Bombardment Squadron (Medium) on 20 March 1943

Activated on 20 April 1943

- Redesignated 597th Bombardment Squadron, Medium c. April 1944

Inactivated on 5 January 1946

=== Assignments ===
- 397th Bombardment Group, 20 April 1943 – 5 January 1946

=== Stations ===
- MacDill Field, Florida, 20 April 1943
- Avon Park Army Air Field, Florida, 14 October 1943
- Hunter Field, Georgia, 2 November 1943 – 14 March 1944
- RAF Gosfield (Station 154), England, 5 April 1944
- RAF Rivenhall (Station 168), England, 15 April 1944
- RAF Hurn (AAF-492), England, 5 August 1944
- Gorges Airfield (A-26), France, 31 August 1944
- Dreux/Vernouillet Airfield (A-41), France, c. 15 September 1944
- Peronne Airfield (A-72), France, c. 7 October 1944
- Venlo Airfield (Y-55), Netherlands, 25 April 1945
- Peronne Airfield (A-72), France, 31 May – c. December 1945
- Camp Shanks, New York, 4–5 January 1946

=== Aircraft ===
- Martin B-26 Marauder, 1943–1945 (Note: Maurer says 1943–1946, but the squadron was either at sea or at the port of embarkation for the five days it was active in January 1946, and was not equipped with aircraft.)

=== Awards and campaigns ===
Award streamer	Award	Dates	Notes
	Distinguished Unit Citation	23 December 1944 Germany	597th Bombardment Squadron

Campaign Streamer	Campaign	Dates	Notes
	Air Offensive, Europe	5 April 1944 – 5 June 1944	597th Bombardment Squadron
	Normandy	6 June 1944 – 24 July 1944	597th Bombardment Squadron
	Northern France	25 July 1944 – 14 September 1944	597th Bombardment Squadron
	Rhineland	15 September 1944 – 21 March 1945	597th Bombardment Squadron
	Ardennes-Alsace	16 December 1944 – 25 January 1945	597th Bombardment Squadron
	Central Europe	5 April 1944 – 21 May 1945	597th Bombardment Squadron

== See also ==
- List of Martin B-26 Marauder operators
