= 599th Bombardment Squadron =

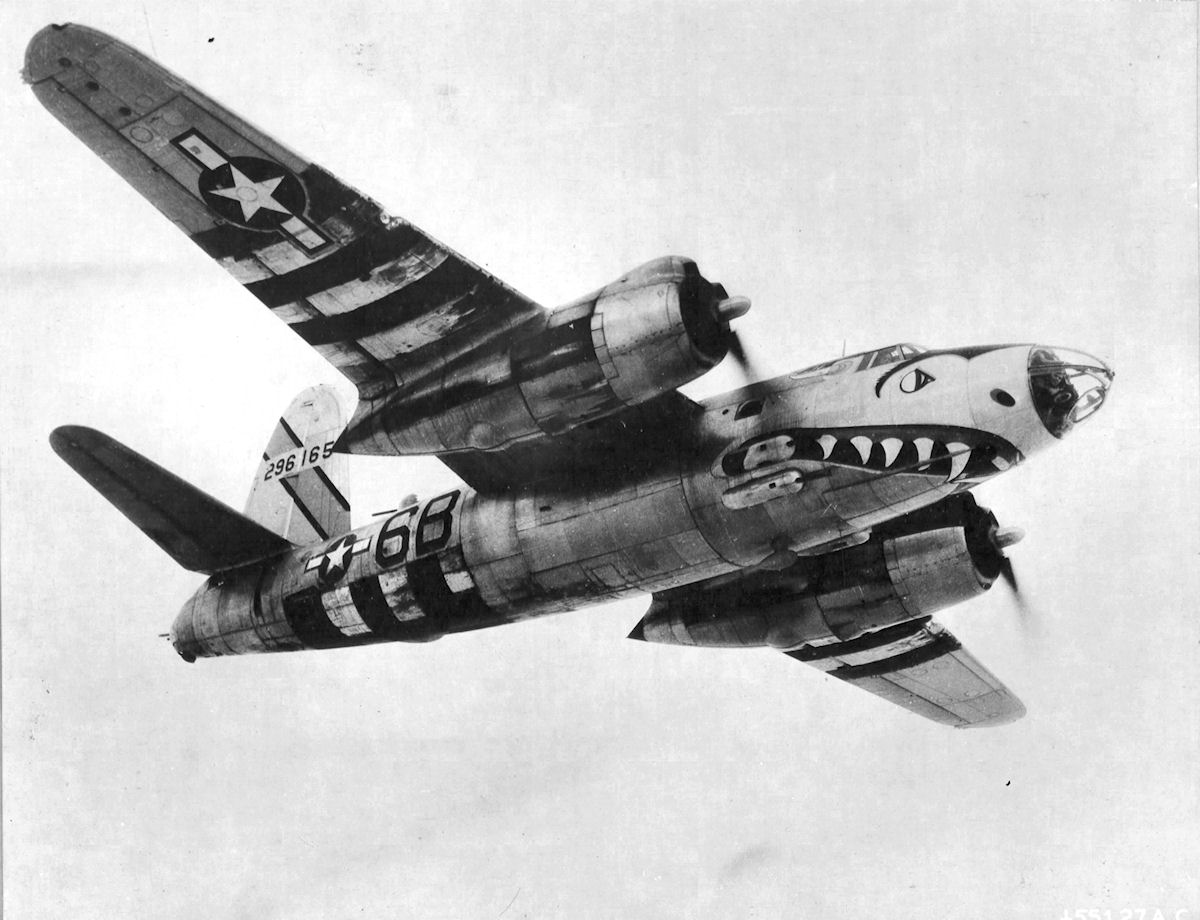
- Martin B-26 Marauder of the 599th Bombardment Squadron (Note: Aircraft is Martin B-26B-55-MA Marauder serial 42-96165, Big Hairy Bird, fuseage code 6B-I Taken on 1 December 1944.)
- Active: 1943–1945
- Country: United States
- Branch: United States Army Air Forces
- Role: Medium bomber
- Engagements: European Theater of Operations
- Decorations: Distinguished Unit Citation

Insignia
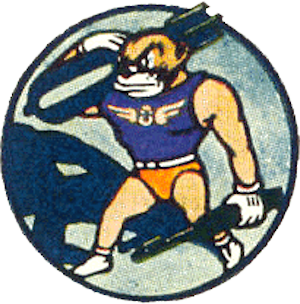
- 599th Bombardment Squadron emblem (Note: Approved 10 June 1944. Description: Over and through a light blue green disc, border black, a caricatured beaver with look of ferocity on face, having human "strong man's" body tan, wearing light red boxing trunks, white belt, and blue sleeveless jersey marked on chest with winged beaver head, and white shoes and gloves, carrying a large black aerial bomb, highlighted of the field [color] on the right shoulder, and a black, aerial machine gun in the left hand, highlighted of the field [color], all casting black drop shadow to dexter.)
- Group tail marking: Yellow diagonal stripe
- Squadron fuselage code: 6B

The 599th Bombardment Squadron is an inactive United States Air Force unit. It was activated at MacDill Field, Florida in April 1943. After training in the United States, it transferred to the European Theater of Operations, where it was a component of IX Bomber Command. The squadron served in combat from April 1944 until the end of World War II, earning a Distinguished Unit Citation for an attack on Ediger-Eller, Germany, in December 1944 during the Battle of the Bulge. Following V-E Day the squadron remained in France until December 1945, when it returned to the United States and was inactivated at Camp Kilmer in December 1945.

== History ==
Media related to 397th Bombardment Group (United States Army Air Forces) at Wikimedia Commons

The squadron was established at MacDill Field, Florida in April 1943 as one of the original squadrons of the 397th Bombardment Group, a Martin B-26 Marauder medium bomber group. It drew its initial cadre from the 21st Bombardment Group. The squadron trained under Third Air Force at stations in the southeastern United States. After completing its training by participating in the Tennessee Maneuvers, the squadron departed Hunter Field, Georgia for the European Theater of Operations on 12 March 1944.

The squadron was temporarily stationed at RAF Gosfield upon its arrival in England in early April 1944. On the 15th of the month, its parent group displaced the 363d Fighter Group at RAF Rivenhall and flew its first combat mission five days later. In preparation for Operation Overlord, the invasion of Normandy, the squadron participated in Operation Crossbow, attacking V-1 flying bomb launch pads. It also struck bridges, coastal defenses, marshalling yards and airfields in northern France. On D-Day the squadron attacked strong points and bombed fuel dumps and other objectives to support ground forces throughout the Normandy Campaign.

In July 1944, the squadron participated in Operation Cobra, attacking German forces near Saint Lo, France during the Allied breakout there. In August, the squadron moved from England to Gorges Airfield, an Advanced Landing Ground in France. From there it attacked naval targets at Saint Malo and Brest. Once on the Continent, the squadron made frequent moves forward as the Allied forces advanced during the Northern France Campaign. By September the squadron began flying missions into Germany, attacking depots and defended areas.

During the Battle of the Bulge, the squadron struck enemy lines of communications. On 23 December 1944 the unit severed a railway bridge at Ediger-Eller, Germany, despite heavy flak and fighter opposition from the Luftwaffe. For this action it was awarded a Distinguished Unit Citation. The squadron continued to fly missions to support the Allied drive into Germany until 20 April 1945, exactly one year after its first combat mission, having completed 239 combat missions.

After V-E Day the squadron returned to its former base at Peronne Airfield, France, and remained there until December, when it returned to the United States. Upon arrival at Camp Kilmer, New Jersey in late December, the squadron was inactivated.

== Lineage ==
- Constituted as the 599th Bombardment Squadron (Medium) on 20 March 1943

Activated on 20 April 1943

- Redesignated 599th Bombardment Squadron, Medium c. April 1944

Inactivated on 22 December 1945

=== Assignments ===
- 397th Bombardment Group, 20 April 1943 – 22 December 1945

=== Stations ===
- MacDill Field, Florida, 20 April 1943
- Avon Park Army Air Field, Florida, 14 October 1943
- Hunter Field, Georgia, 1 November 1943 – 12 March 1944
- RAF Gosfield (Station 154), England, 5 April 1944
- RAF Rivenhall (Station 168), England, 15 April 1944
- RAF Hurn (AAF-492), England, 5 August 1944
- Gorges Airfield (A-26), France, c. 31 August 1944
- Dreux/Vernouillet Airfield (A-41), France, c. 16 September 1944
- Peronne Airfield (A-72), France, c. 7 October 1944
- Venlo Airfield (Y-55), Netherlands, 25 April 1945
- Peronne Airfield (A-72), France, 30 May – c. December 1945
- Camp Kilmer, New Jersey, 21–22 December 1945

=== Aircraft ===
- Martin B-26 Marauder, 1943–1945

=== Awards and campaigns ===
Award streamer	Award	Dates	Notes
	Distinguished Unit Citation	23 December 1944 Germany	599th Bombardment Squadron

Campaign Streamer	Campaign	Dates	Notes
	Air Offensive, Europe	5 April 1944 – 5 June 1944	599th Bombardment Squadron
	Normandy	6 June 1944 – 24 July 1944	599th Bombardment Squadron
	Northern France	25 July 1944 – 14 September 1944	599th Bombardment Squadron
	Rhineland	15 September 1944 – 21 March 1945	599th Bombardment Squadron
	Ardennes-Alsace	16 December 1944 – 25 January 1945	599th Bombardment Squadron
	Central Europe	5 April 1944 – 21 May 1945	599th Bombardment Squadron

== See also ==
- List of Martin B-26 Marauder operators
