= 598th Range Squadron =

Range management unit of the United States Air Force

598th Range Squadron

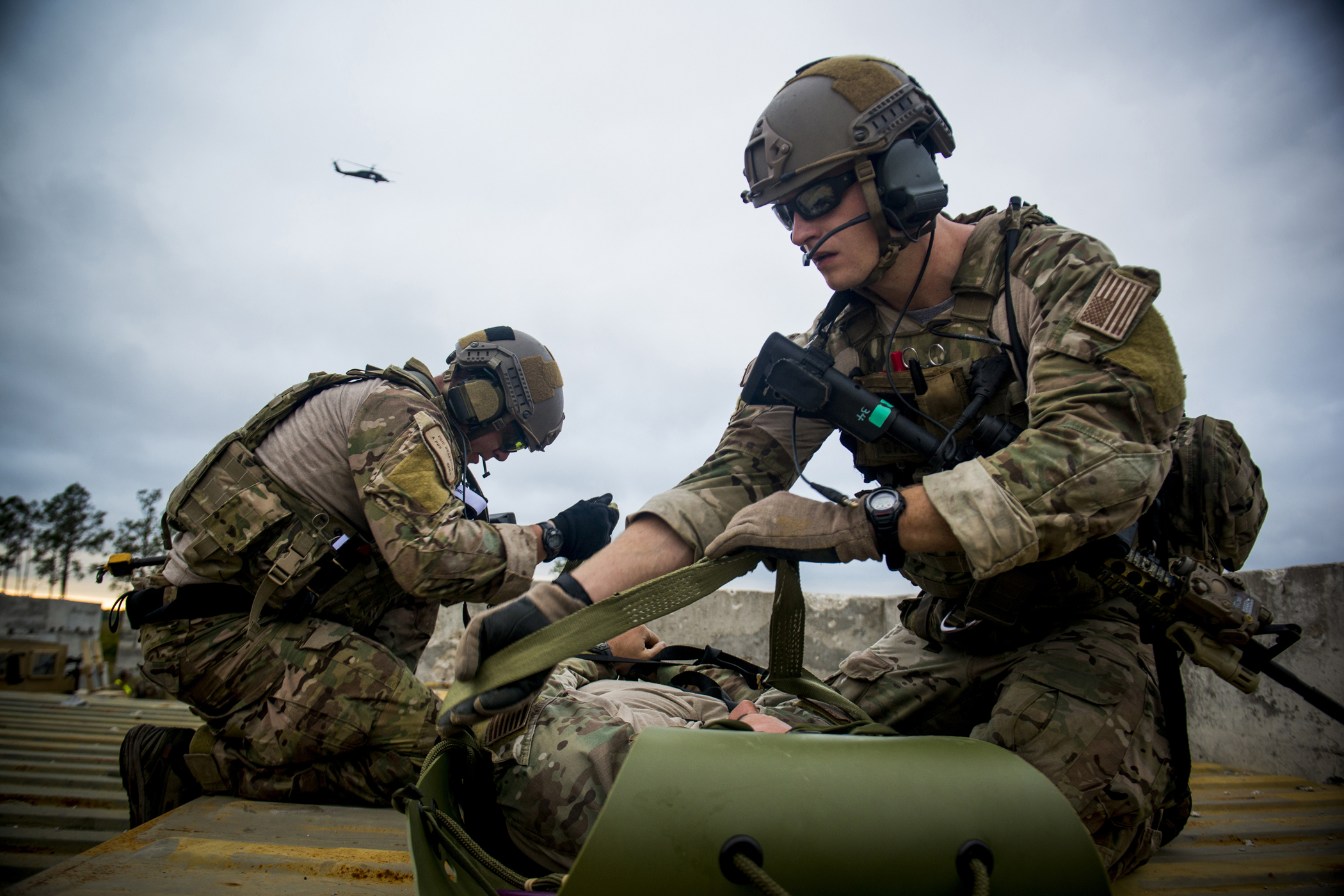
- USAF Pararescuemen prepare a simulated casualty for medical evacuation during a training exercise at Avon Park Air Force Range while their Sikorsky HH-60 Pave Hawk helicopter orbits overhead
- Active: 1943–1945; 2015–present
- Country: United States
- Branch: United States Air Force
- Role: Range management
- Part of: Air Combat Command
- Garrison/HQ: Avon Park Air Force Range
- Mottos: Si Vis Pacem Para Bellumn (Latin for 'If You Desire Peace, Prepare for War')
- Engagements: European Theater of Operations
- Decorations: Distinguished Unit Citation

Insignia
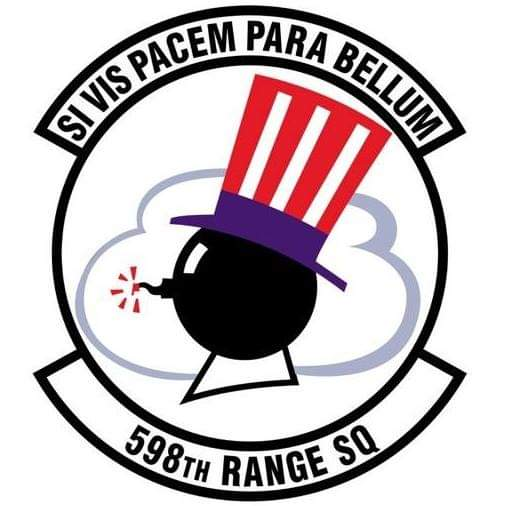
- 598th Range Squadron emblem

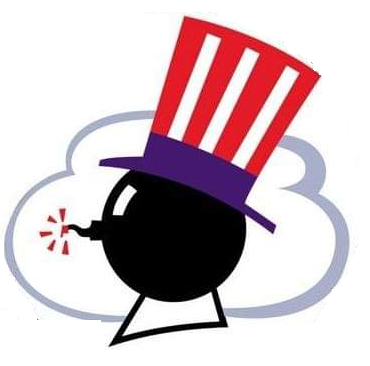
- 598th Bombardment Squadron emblem (Note: Approved 5 February 1944. Description: A black fire bomb lighted at the fuse proper, highlighted white, to form the nose and eye of caricatured head, resting on outline collar base, and supporting a red, white, and blue top hat, all in front of an irregular white cloud formation, outlined light blue.)
- World War II group tail marking: Yellow diagonal stripe
- World War II squadron fuselage code: U2

The 598th Range Squadron is an active United States Air Force unit. It is assigned to the 23d Fighter Group and is stationed at Avon Park Air Force Range, Florida where it replaced Detachment 1, 23d Fighter Group on 22 September 2015. The squadron also operates the Deployed Unit Complex at MacDill Air Force Base, Florida.

It was first activated at MacDill Field, Florida in April 1943 as the 598th Bombardment Squadron. After training in the United States, it transferred to the European Theater of Operations, where it was a component of IX Bomber Command. The squadron served in combat from April 1944 until the end of World War II, earning a Distinguished Unit Citation for an attack on Ediger-Eller, Germany, in December 1944 during the Battle of the Bulge. Following V-E Day the squadron remained in France until December 1945, when it returned the United States and was inactivated at Camp Kilmer.

== Mission ==
The 598th Range Squadron is responsible for operating the range and a deployed unit complex located at MacDill Air Force Base, FL. The squadron provides extensive, diverse and convenient training airspace and ranges with capabilities for military air and ground training. The Avon Park Air Ground Training Complex is the largest training range east of the Mississippi River and includes an 8,000 foot (2,400 m) long operational runway.

== History ==
=== World War II ===
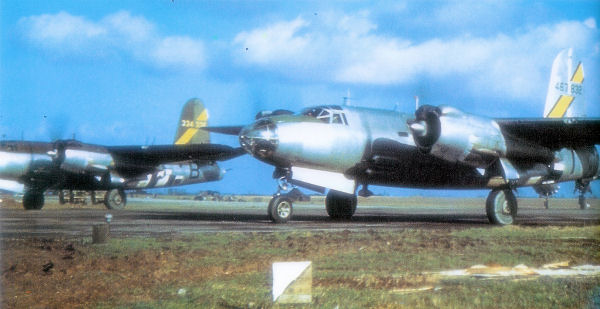
598th Bombardment Squadron B-26 Marauders at RAF Rivenhall

The squadron was established at MacDill Field, Florida in April 1943 as one of the original squadrons of the 397th Bombardment Group, a Martin B-26 Marauder medium bomber group. It drew its initial cadre from the 21st Bombardment Group. The squadron trained under Third Air Force at stations in the southeastern United States. After completing its training by participating in the Tennessee Maneuvers, the squadron departed Hunter Field, Georgia for the European Theater of Operations on 13 March 1944.

The squadron was temporarily stationed at RAF Gosfield upon its arrival in England in early April 1944. On the 15th of the month, its parent group displaced the 363d Fighter Group at RAF Rivenhall and flew its first combat mission five days later. In preparation for Operation Overlord, the invasion of Normandy, the squadron participated in Operation Crossbow, attacking V-1 flying bomb launch pads. It also struck bridges, coastal defenses, marshalling yards and airfields in northern France. On D-Day the squadron attacked strong points and bombed fuel dumps and other objectives to support ground forces throughout the Normandy Campaign.

In July 1944, the squadron participated in Operation Cobra, attacking German forces near Saint Lo, France, during the Allied breakout there. In August, the squadron moved from England to Gorges Airfield, an Advanced Landing Ground in France. From there it attacked naval targets at Saint Malo and Brest. Once on the Continent, the squadron made frequent moves forward as the Allied forces advanced during the Northern France Campaign. By September the squadron began flying missions into Germany, attacking depots and defended areas.

During the Battle of the Bulge, the squadron struck enemy lines of communications. On 23 December 1944 the unit severed a railway bridge at Ediger-Eller, Germany, despite heavy flak and fighter opposition from the Luftwaffe. For this action it was awarded a Distinguished Unit Citation. The squadron continued to fly missions to support the Allied drive into Germany until 20 April 1945, exactly one year after its first combat mission, having completed 239 combat missions.

After V-E Day the squadron returned to its former base at Peronne Airfield, France, and remained there until December, when it returned to the United States. Upon arrival at Camp Kilmer, New Jersey in late December 1945, the squadron was inactivated.

=== Range management ===
The squadron was redesignated 598th Range Squadron and activated at the MacDill Air Force Base auxiliary field at Avon Park Air Force Range, Florida on 22 September 2015. It replaced Detachment 1, 23d Fighter Group, which had been managing the range and the Deployed Unit Complex at MacDill previously. The 598th Squadron operates both the Avon Park Air Force Range in Polk County and Highlands County, Florida and the Deployed Unit Complex.

The squadron is part of the 23d Fighter Group, part of the 23d Wing, located at Moody Air Force Base, Georgia.

== Lineage ==
- Constituted as the 598th Bombardment Squadron (Medium) on 20 March 1943

Activated on 20 April 1943

- Redesignated 598th Bombardment Squadron, Medium c. April 1944

Inactivated on 31 December 1945

- Redesignated 598th Range Squadron on 12 August 2015

Activated on 22 September 2015

=== Assignments ===
- 397th Bombardment Group, 20 April 1943 – 31 December 1945
- 23d Fighter Group, 22 September 2015 – present

=== Stations ===
- MacDill Field, Florida, 20 April 1943
- Avon Park Army Air Field, Florida, 14 October 1943
- Hunter Field, Georgia, 1 November 1943 – 13 March 1944
- RAF Gosfield (Station 154), England, 5 April 1944
- RAF Rivenhall (Station 168), England, 15 April 1944
- RAF Hurn (AAF-492), England, 4 August 1944
- Gorges Airfield (A-26), France, 30 August 1944
- Dreux/Vernouillet Airfield (A-41), France, c. 16 September 1944
- Peronne Airfield (A-72), France, c. 8 October 1944
- Venlo Airfield (Y-55), Netherlands, 25 April 1945
- Peronne Airfield (A-72), France, 30 May – c. December 1945
- Camp Kilmer, New Jersey, 30 – 31 December 1945
- Avon Park Air Force Range, Florida, 22 September 2015 – present

=== Aircraft ===
- Martin B-26 Marauder, 1943–1945

=== Awards and campaigns ===
Award streamer	Award	Dates	Notes
	Distinguished Unit Citation	23 December 1944 Germany	598th Bombardment Squadron

Campaign Streamer	Campaign	Dates	Notes
	Air Offensive, Europe	5 April 1944 – 5 June 1944	598th Bombardment Squadron
	Normandy	6 June 1944 – 24 July 1944	598th Bombardment Squadron
	Northern France	25 July 1944 – 14 September 1944	598th Bombardment Squadron
	Rhineland	15 September 1944 – 21 March 1945	598th Bombardment Squadron
	Ardennes-Alsace	16 December 1944 – 25 January 1945	598th Bombardment Squadron
	Central Europe	5 April 1944 – 21 May 1945	598th Bombardment Squadron

== See also ==
- List of United States Air Force squadrons
- List of Martin B-26 Marauder operators
