= Anna Zenz =

German Wine Queen (born 2001)

German Wine Queen
- Incumbent
- Assumed office September 2025

Personal details
- Born: 2001 (age 23–24) Ediger-Eller, Germany

Anna Zenz (born 2001 in Ediger-Eller, Germany) is a German wine queen. She was elected the 77th German Wine Queen in September 2025 and will represent German wine during her term of office 2025/26.

== Early life ==
Zenz grew up in Ediger-Eller on the Moselle river, where her family runs a winery, restaurant and distillery. She trained as an insurance clerk and studies part-time at the Verwaltungs- und Wirtschaftsakademie (Academy of Administration and Business) in Koblenz.

== Wine queen ==
In September 2024, Zenz was elected Moselle Wine Queen. Her princesses were Paula Sophie Scherrer, Maja Treis and Anne van Dongen.

Representing the Moselle, she competed at the 2025 contest for the 77th German Wine Queen in Neustadt an der Weinstraße. She won the final and was crowned 77th German Wine Queen. Her German Wine Princesses are Emma Meinhardt (Saale-Unstrut) and Katja Simon (Hessische Bergstraße).
