= RAF Rivenhall =

Former Royal Air Force station in Essex, England

RAF Rivenhall USAAF Station AAF-168
- Near Braintree, Essex in England
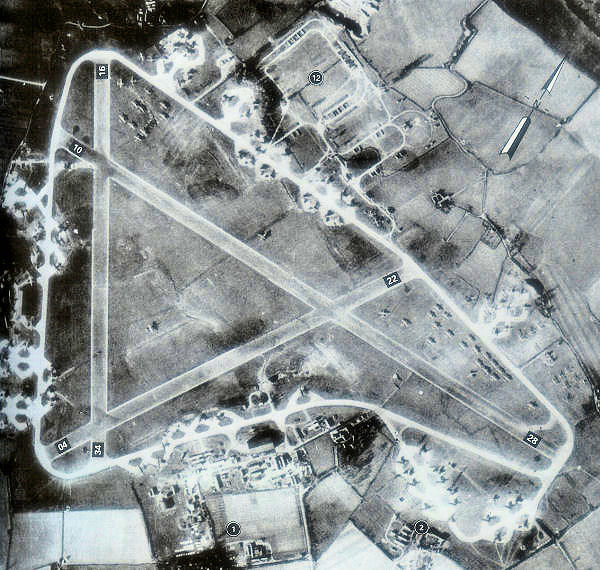
- Rivenhall airfield photographed in April 1944 with the B-26 Marauders of the 397th Bombardment Group parked on the grass, while the P-51 Mustangs of the 363d Fighter Group are still on the dispersal loops.

Site information
- Type: Royal Air Force station
- Code: RL
- Owner: Air Ministry
- Operator: United States Army Air Forces; Royal Air Force
- Controlled by: Ninth Air Force 1943-44; RAF Fighter Command 1944- * No. 38 Group RAF

Location
- Shown within Essex RAF Rivenhall (the United Kingdom)
- Coordinates: 51°51′19″N 000°38′23″E

Site history
- Built: 1944
- Built by: W. & C. French Ltd
- In use: December 1944 - January 1946
- Battles/wars: European theatre of World War II

Airfield information
- Elevation: 168 feet (51 m) AMSL
Runways
Direction	Length and surface
00/00	Concrete/Tarmac
00/00	Concrete/Tarmac
00/00	Concrete/Tarmac

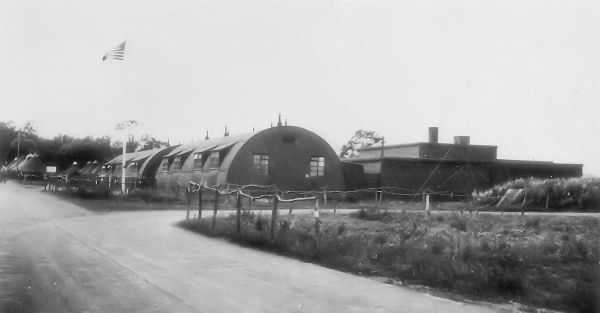
Rivenhall airfield headquarters site, 1944.

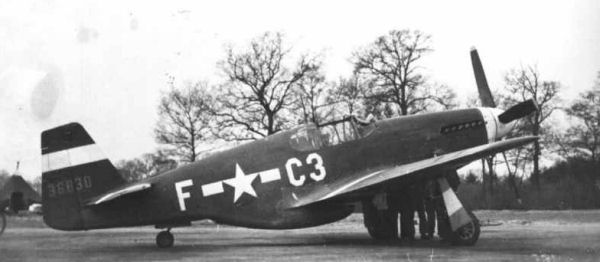
North American P-51B-5 Mustang of the 382d Fighter Squadron.

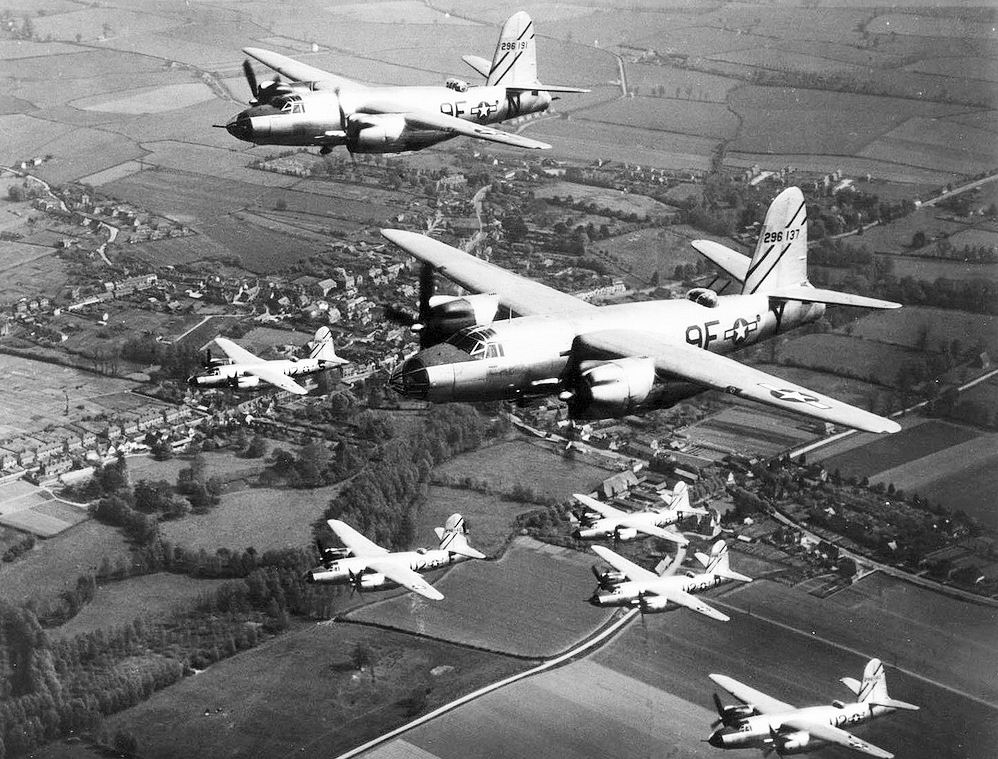
Formation of Martin B-26B Marauders of the 397th Bomb Group. Closest two aircraft are from the 597th Bomb Squadron; the other B-26's are from the 598th BS. Photo taken before D-Day, as the Marauders are not painted with invasion stripes

Royal Air Force Rivenhall or more RAF Rivenhall is a former Royal Air Force station located 4 miles (6.4 km) south-southeast of Braintree, Essex, England.

Opened in 1942, it was used by the Royal Air Force and United States Army Air Forces. During the war it was used primarily as a combat airfield for fighter and bomber units. It was closed in 1946 and kept in reserve until 1956. The remains of the airfield are located on private property with the northern half having been turned into a quarry.

== History ==
=== USAAF use ===
Rivenhall was known as USAAF Station AAF-168 for security reasons by the USAAF during the war, and was referred to thus to avoid revealing its location. Its USAAF Station Code was "RL".

==== 363d Fighter Group ====
On 22 January 1944 a squadron of the 363d Fighter Group arrived from RAF Keevil where it had been awaiting equipment. The group had been selected as the third in the European Theatre to be equipped with the new North American P-51B Mustang. The group consisted of:

- 380th Fighter Squadron (A9)
- 381st Fighter Squadron (B3)
- 382d Fighter Squadron (C3)

On 14 April 1944, as part of a general movement of Ninth Air Force fighter units in the Colchester area to advanced landing grounds, the 363d moved to RAF Staplehurst. The movement of all elements having begun two days previously.

==== 397th Bombardment Group ====
On the day following the departure of the 363d the first Martin B-26 Marauders of the 397th Bombardment Group arrived from RAF Gosfield. The group consisted of

- 596th Bombardment Squadron (X2)
- 597th Bombardment Squadron (9F)
- 598th Bombardment Squadron (U2)
- 599th Bombardment Squadron (6B)

The group's identification marking was a yellow diagonal band across both sides of the fin (vertical stabiliser).

Early in August, officially on 5 August, the 397th transferred from Rivenhall to RAF Hurn in Hampshire to give the Marauders a better radius of action, as the break-out of the Allied forces from the Normandy beachhead meant that potential targets were receding.

=== RAF use ===
The following units were here at some point:

- No. 295 Squadron RAF (1944-46)
- No. 570 Squadron RAF (1944-45)
- No. 1677 (Target Towing) Flight RAF

== Current use ==
Upon its release from military use, in June 1956, Marconi leased part of the airfield and within ten years had taken over most of the surviving buildings. Today the northern half of the former airfield is a quarry, with the vast majority of the land in the north-west of the site having been excavated.

The perimeter track of the airfield has been reduced to a single track agricultural road. All three runways either have been quarried, or substantially reduced in width, with the grass areas of the former airfield returned to agriculture. One T-2 hangar remains, along with a scattering of buildings. A motor salvage business has taken over some of the hardstands in the east end of the airfield, where once C-47s and gliders were stored. As of 2022, an integrated waste management facility is being constructed on part of the site.

== See also ==
- List of former Royal Air Force stations
