= 397th Bombardment Wing =

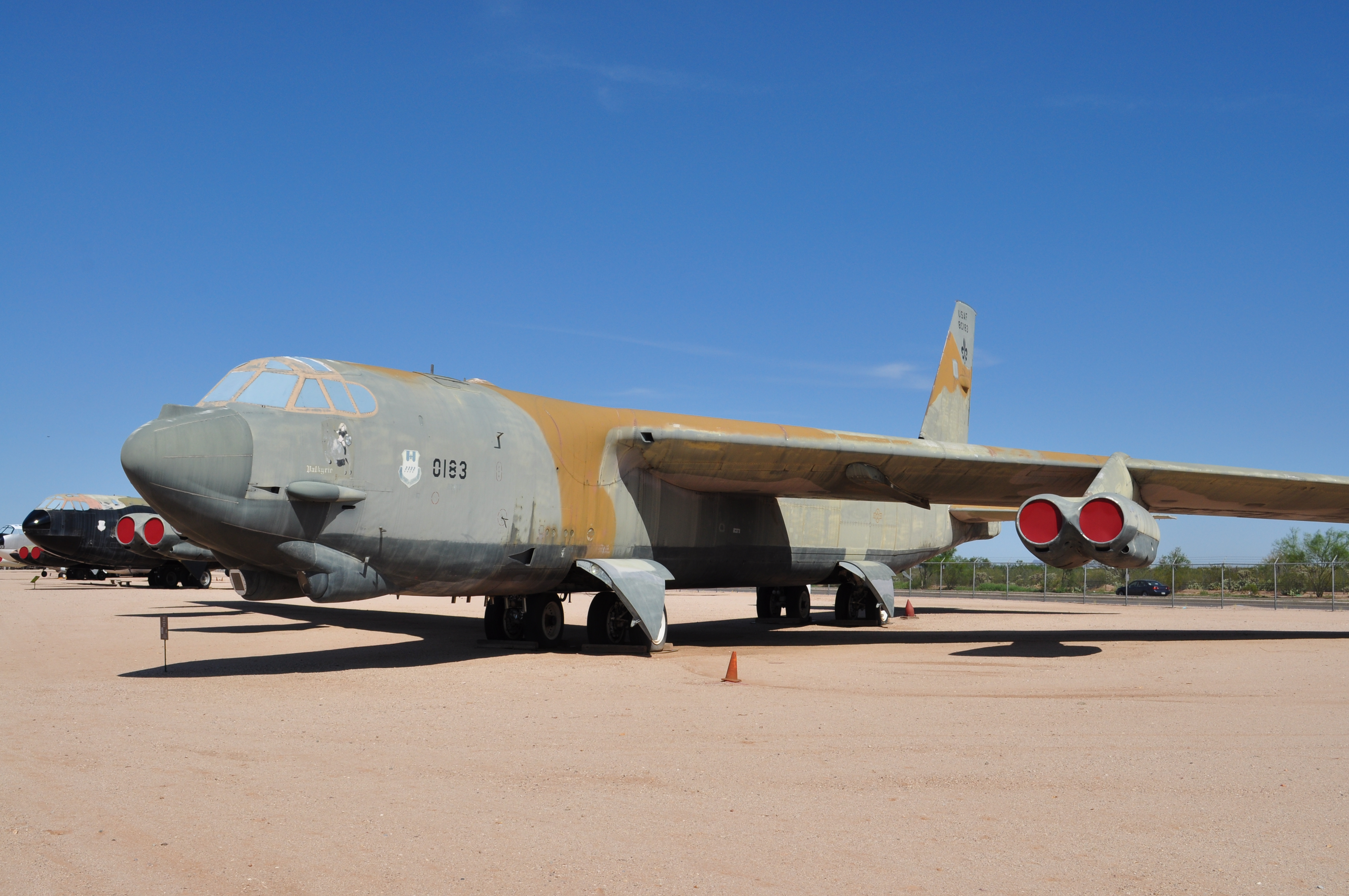
- Boeing B-52G in storage at Davis–Monthan Air Force Base. This plane was assigned to the 397th Bombardment Wing in 1968
- Active: 1943–1946, 1963–1968
- Country: United States
- Branch: United States Air Force
- Role: Strategic bombardment
- Motto: Custodes Libertatis (Latin for 'Guardians of Freedom')
- Engagements: European theater of World War II
- Decorations: Distinguished Unit Citation

Insignia
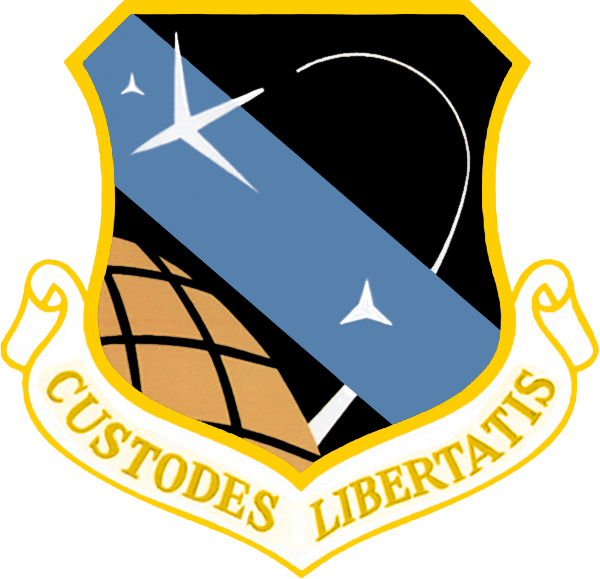
- 397th Bombardment Wing emblem (Note: Approved 30 October 1963.)

The 397th Bombardment Wing is an inactive United States Air Force unit, last assigned to the 45th Air Division of Strategic Air Command at Dow Air Force Base, Maine, where it was inactivated on 25 April 1968.

It was originally organized as the 397th Bombardment Group, a World War II United States Army Air Forces combat organization. It deployed to Western Europe with Ninth Air Force as a medium bombardment unit equipped with Martin B-26 Marauders. It returned to the United States during December 1945, being inactivated on 6 January 1946.

The 397th Bombardment Wing was organized in 1963 as part of Strategic Air Command's deterrent force during the Cold War. It was inactivated when Dow closed. In early 1984 the group and wing were consolidated into a single unit, but have not been active since.

== History ==
=== World War II ===
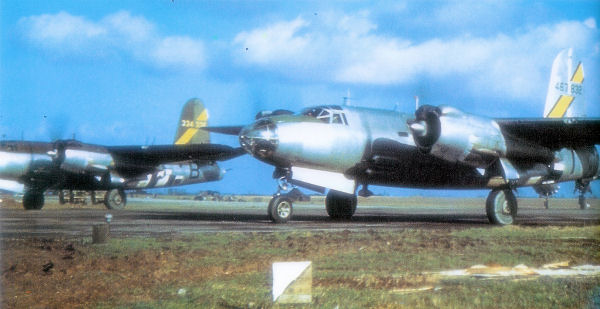
B-26C Marauder of the 598th Bomb Squadron (Note: Aircraft is Martin B-26C-45-MO Marauder, serial 42-107832.)

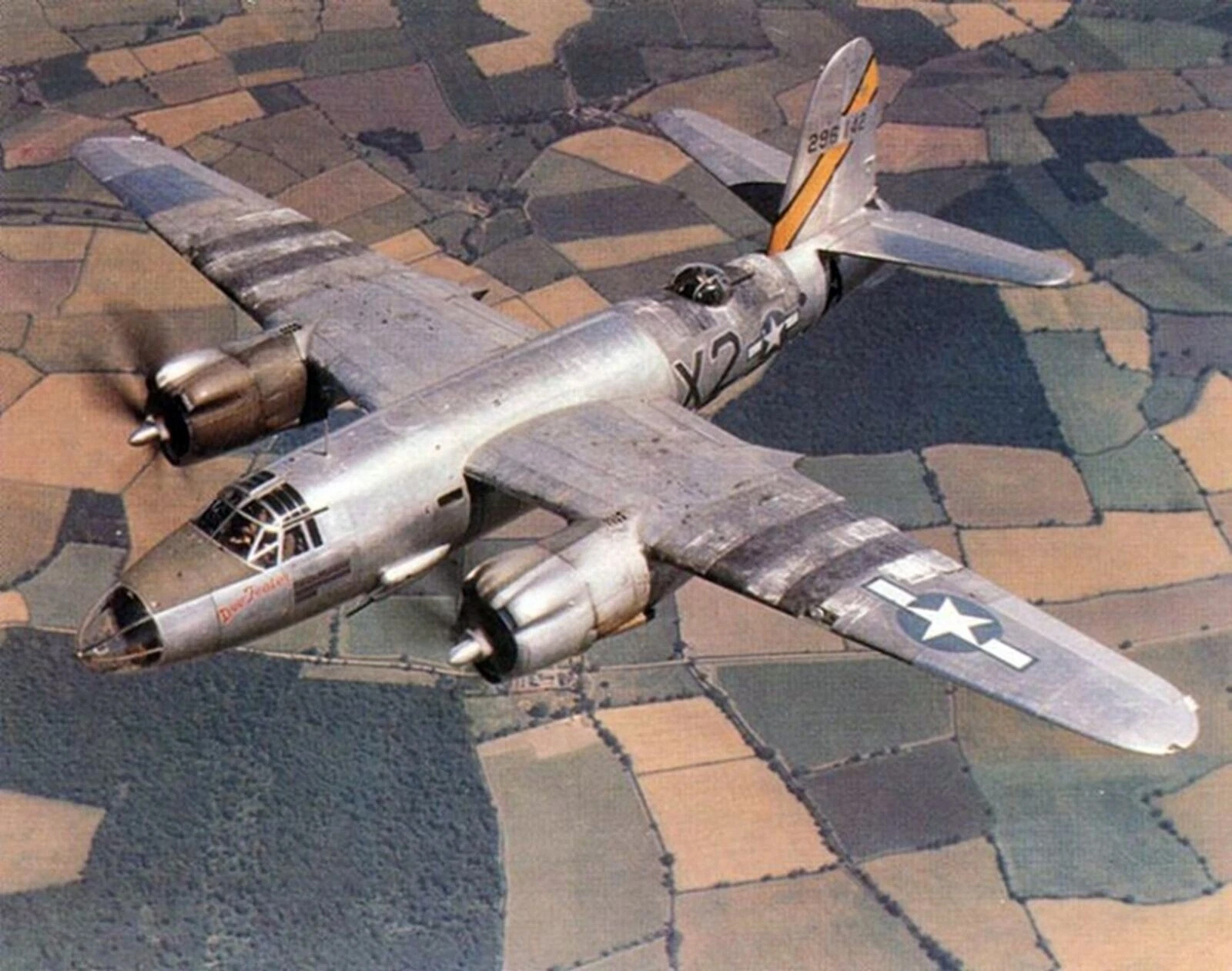
B-26BMarauder of the 596th Bombardment Squadron (Note: Aircraft is Martin B-26B-55-MA Marauder Serial 42-96142.)

Constituted as 397th Bombardment Group (Medium) on 20 March 1943. Activated on 20 April 1943. Trained with B-26's. Moved to RAF Gosfield England, March–April 1944, and assigned to Ninth Air Force, however. no sooner had they arrived than they were moved on to RAF Rivenhall. The group's identification marking was a yellow diagonal band across both sides of the vertical tailplane.

Over the next few days, more than 60 'bare metal' B-26s were to be seen on the Rivenhall hardstands. Although fresh from the training grounds in south-eastern United States, and having only reached the UK early in April. the 397th undertook its first combat mission on 20 April: an attack on a Pas de Calais V-1 site.

During its tenure of Rivenhall the 397th undertook 56 bombing missions, 32 of them attacks on bridges. Other targets were enemy airfields, rail junctions, fuel and ammunition stores, V-weapon sites and various military installations in France and the Low Countries. During these missions a total of 16 B-26s were missing in action and several others wrecked in crash-landings at the base.

Early in August, officially on the 5th, the 397th moved from Rivenhall to RAF Hurn in Hampshire, to give the Marauders a better radius of action as the break-out of the Allied forces from the Normandy beachhead meant that potential targets were receding.

Although moving from Rivenhall, the group arrived without ceasing operations and flew 72 missions from Hurn before moving to the Advanced Landing Ground at Gorges Airfield, France (A-26) on 19 August, with the last departures on the 30th and 31st. Three Marauders were lost during the month's stay.

On the continent, the 397th struck enemy positions at St Malo and Brest and bombed targets in the Rouen area as Allied armies swept across the Seine and advanced to the Siegfried Line. The group began flying missions into Germany in September, attacking such targets as bridges, defended areas, and storage depots.

The 397th struck the enemy's communications during the Battle of the Bulge (December 1944 – January 1945) and received a Distinguished Unit Citation for a mission on 23 December 1944 when the group withstood heavy flak and fighter attack to sever a railway bridge at Eller, a vital link in the enemy's supply line across the Moselle.

The group continued to support the Allied drive into Germany until April 1945, being stationed at Venlo, the Netherlands (Y-55) on VE-Day. It returned to the United States during December 1945 – January 1946, being inactivated at Camp Kilmer, New Jersey on 6 January 1946.

=== Strategic Air Command ===
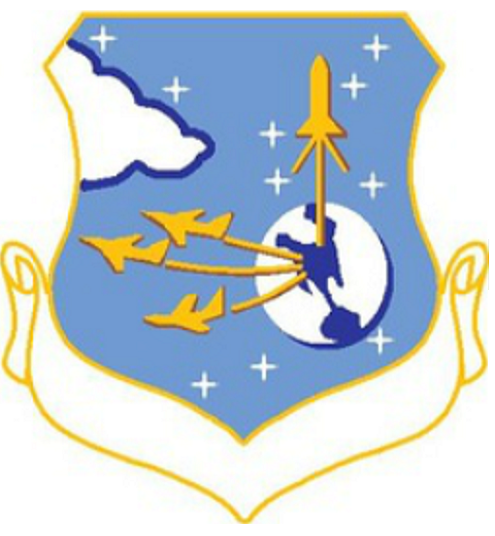
Emblem of the 4038th Strategic Wing

On 1 August 1958, Strategic Air Command (SAC) organized the 4038th Strategic Wing at Dow Air Force Base, Maine and assigned it to the 820th Air Division on 1 January 1959 as part of SAC's plan to disperse its Boeing B-52 Stratofortress heavy bombers over a larger number of bases, thus making it more difficult for the Soviet Union to knock out the entire fleet with a surprise first strike. The wing remained a headquarters only until 1 February 1960 when the 4060th Air Refueling Wing was discontinued and its support organizations transferred to the 4038th in addition to the 71st and 341st Air Refueling Squadrons, flying Boeing KC-97 Stratofreighters. Fifteen days later the 341st Bombardment Squadron moved to Dow from its previous station at Blytheville Air Force Base, Arkansas where it had been one of the three squadrons assigned to the 97th Bombardment Wing and re-equipped with 15 B-52Gs. Starting in 1960, one third of the wing's aircraft were maintained on fifteen-minute alert, fully fueled and ready for combat to reduce vulnerability to a Soviet missile strike. This was increased to half the unit's aircraft in 1962. On 1 April 1961, the wing was transferred to the control of the 6th Air Division. In 1962, the wing bombers began to be equipped with the GAM-77 Hound Dog and the GAM-72 Quail air-launched cruise missiles, The 4038th Airborne Missile Maintenance Squadron was activated in November to maintain these missiles.

In 1962, in order to perpetuate the lineage of many currently inactive bombardment units with illustrious World War II records, Headquarters SAC received authority from Headquarters USAF to discontinue its Major Command controlled (MAJCON) strategic wings controlling combat squadron, which could not carry a permanent history or lineage, and to activate Air Force controlled (AFCON) units to replace them, time which could carry a lineage and history. As a result, the 4038th was replaced by the 397th Bombardment Wing, Heavy, which assumed its mission, personnel, and equipment on 1 February 1963.

In the same way the 596th Bombardment Squadron, one of the unit's World War II historical bomb squadrons, replaced the 341st. The 860th Medical Group, 57th Munitions Maintenance Squadron and the two air refueling squadrons were reassigned to the 397th. Component support units were replaced by units with numerical designation of the newly established wing. Under the Dual Deputate organization, (Note: Under this plan, flying squadrons reported to the wing Deputy Commander for Operations and maintenance squadrons reported to the wing Deputy Commander for Maintenance.) all flying and maintenance squadrons were directly assigned to the wing, so no operational group element was activated. Therefore, the history, lineage and honors of the 397th Bombardment Group were temporarily bestowed upon the newly established wing upon activation.

The 397th Bomb Wing continued to conduct strategic bombardment training and air refueling operations to meet operational commitments of Strategic Air Command, including deployments to Southeast Asia during the Vietnam War. The wing's refueling elements changed when the 341st Air Refueling Squadron inactivated in the fall of 1963, while the 71st traded in its KC-97s for Boeing KC-135 Stratotankers the following spring. By 1968, Intercontinental ballistic missiles had been deployed and become operational as part of the United States' strategic triad, and the need for B-52s had been reduced. In addition, funds were also needed to cover the costs of combat operations in Indochina. The 397th Bombardment Wing was inactivated on 25 April 1968 and its aircraft were reassigned to other SAC units. As part of the inactivation, Dow was closed.

== Lineage ==
397th Bombardment Group

- Constituted as the 397th Bombardment Group (Medium) on 20 March 1943

Activated on 20 April 1943
Resesignated 397th Bombardment Group, Medium c. April 1944
Inactivated on 6 January 1946

- Consolidated on 31 January 1984 with the 397th Bombardment Wing as the 397th Bombardment Wing

397th Bombardment Wing

- Constituted as the 397th Bombardment Wing, Heavy on 15 November 1962

Activated on 15 November 1962 (not organized)
Organized on 1 February 1963
Inactivated on 25 April 1968

- Consolidated on 31 January 1984 with the 397th Bombardment Group

=== Assignments ===
- Third Air Force, 20 April 1943
- 98th Bombardment Wing, 5 April 1944 – December 1945
- Army Service Forces (for inactivation), 5–6 January 1946
- Strategic Air Command, 15 November 1962 (not organized)
- 6th Air Division, 1 February 1963
- 45th Air Division, 2 July 1966 – 25 April 1968

=== Components ===
- 19th Air Refueling Squadron, 1 February 1963 – 15 June 1963 (KC-97)

At Otis Air Force Base, Massachusetts

- 71st Air Refueling Squadron, 1 February 1963 – 25 April 1968 (KC-135)
- 341st Air Refueling Squadron, 1 February 1963 – 1 September 1963 (KC-97)
- 596th Bombardment Squadron, 20 April 1943 – 6 January 1946; 1 February 1963 – 25 April 1968
- 597th Bombardment Squadron, 20 April 1943 – 6 January 1946
- 598th Bombardment Squadron, 20 April 1943 – 6 January 1946
- 599th Bombardment Squadron, 20 April 1943 – 6 January 1946

=== Stations ===
- MacDill Field, Florida, 20 April 1943
- Avon Park Army Air Field, Florida, 12 October 1943
- Hunter Field, Georgia, 1 November 1943 – 13 March 1944
- RAF Gosfield (AAF-154), England, 5 April 1944
- [AF Rivenhall (AAF-168), England, 15 April 1944
- [AF Hurn (AAF-492), England, 5 August 1944 492
- Gorges Airfield (A-26), France, August 1944
- Dreux/Vernouillet Airfield (A-41), France, c. 11 September 1944
- Peronne Airfield (A-72), France, 6 October 1944
- Venlo Airfield (Y-55), Netherlands, 25 April 1945
- Peronne Airfield (A-72), France, c. 24 May – c. December 1945
- Camp Kilmer, New Jersey, 5–6 January 1946
- Dow Air Force Base, Maine, 1 February 1963 – 25 April 1968

=== Aircraft ===
- Martin B-26 Marauder (1943–1946)
- Boeing B-52 Stratofortress (1963–1968)
- Boeing KC-97 Stratofreighter (1963–1964)
- Boeing KC-135 Stratotanker (1964–1968)

== See also ==
- List of B-52 Units of the United States Air Force
- List of MAJCOM wings of the United States Air Force
- List of Martin B-26 Marauder operators
