= Gorges Airfield =

Gorges Airfield Advanced Landing Ground (ALG) A-26

- Picardie Region, France Gorges Airfield (France)

Site information
- Type: Military airfield
- Controlled by: United States Army Air Forces

Location
- Coordinates: 49°14′38″N 001°24′36″W

Site history
- Built by: IX Engineering Command
- In use: August–September 1944
- Materials: Pierced Steel Planking (PSP)
- Battles/wars: Western Front (World War II); Northern France Campaign

Gorges Airfield is an abandoned World War II military airfield, which is located near the commune of Gorges in the Manche region of northern France.

Located just outside Gorges (likely to the east or southeast), the United States Army Air Force established a temporary airfield on 2 August 1944, shortly after the Allied landings in France The airfield was constructed by the IX Engineering Command, 826th Engineer Aviation Battalion.

== History ==
Known as Advanced Landing Ground "A-26", the airfield consisted of a single 6000' (1300m) Pierced Steel Planking runway aligned 07/25. In addition, tents were used for billeting and also for support facilities; an access road was built to the existing road infrastructure; a dump for supplies, ammunition, and gasoline drums, along with a drinkable water and minimal electrical grid for communications and station lighting.

The 397th Bombardment Group, moved its Martin B-26 Marauder bombers from RAF Hurn England to Gorges on 16 August, remaining until 11 September 1944. The bombers attacked railroad bridges, gun emplacements and fuel dumps, along with railroad marshalling yards and German troop concentrations in the occupied areas of France.

After the Americans moved east into Central France with the advancing Allied Armies, the airfield was closed on 28 September 1944. Today the long dismantled airfield is indistinguishable from the agricultural fields in the area.
