= Tennessee Maneuver Area =

Training area in Tennessee

The Tennessee Maneuver Area was a training area in Middle Tennessee, comprising the following counties: Bedford, Cannon, Coffee, DeKalb, Hickman, Humphreys, Jackson, Lawrence, Maury, Moore, Perry, Putnam, Rutherford, Smith, Sumner, Trousdale, Warren, Wayne, White, Williamson, and Wilson. The area was selected because the terrain resembled that of France, Belgium, and Germany.

In June 1941, Major General George S. Patton conducted maneuvers with the 2nd Armored Division in the vicinity of Manchester, Tennessee, where he soundly defeated the opposing forces, using large-scale armored tactics based on Bedford Forrest’s cavalry doctrine. These maneuvers led to the creation of the Tennessee Maneuver Area.

On 24 June 1942, Governor Prentice Cooper, announced that nine counties would be used as a maneuver area by the Second Army, and the area was eventually expanded to twenty-one counties by 1944. By 25 July 1942, the War Department selected Cumberland University, in Lebanon, Tennessee as the location of the Headquarters for the Army Ground Forces field problems, commonly known as the Tennessee Maneuvers.

Between 1942 and 1944, in seven large scale training exercises, more than 850,000 soldiers were trained in the Tennessee Maneuver Area. Training activities in the Tennessee Maneuver Area were suspended in March 1944 because of the great acceleration of overseas shipment of units in advance of the D-Day landings and the resultant lack of combat and service units available to participate in the maneuvers and administer the maneuver area.

== Units Trained in Tennessee Maneuver Area ==
Unit	Year	Training Period
XII Corps	1942	September - November
6th Infantry Division	1942	September - November
8th Infantry Division	1942	September - November
4th Armored Division	1942	October - November
VII Corps	1943	April - June
79th Infantry Division	1943	April - June
81st Infantry Division	1943	April - June
5th Armored Division	1943	April - June
III Corps	1943	June - August
101st Airborne Division	1943	June - July
80th Infantry Division	1943	June - August
83th Infantry Division	1943	June - August
10th Armored Division	1943	June - August
XX Corps^{*}	1943	September - November
30th Infantry Division	1943	September - November
94th Infantry Division	1943	September - November
98th Infantry Division	1943	September - November
12th Armored Division	1943	September - November
XI Corps	1943	November - January 1944
35th Infantry Division	1943	November - January 1944
87th Infantry Division	1943	December - January 1944
100th Infantry Division	1943	November - January 1944
14th Armored Division	1943	November - January 1944
XII Corps	1944	January - March
XXII Corps	1944	January - March
17th Airborne Division	1944	February - March
26th Infantry Division	1944	January - March
78th Infantry Division	1944	January - March
106th Infantry Division	1944	January - March

^{*}Entered maneuver area as IV Armored Corps, re-designated XX Corps on 10 October 1943.
