= Peronne-St Quentin Airfield =

Péronne-St Quentin Airfield Advanced Landing Ground (ALG) A-72
- IATA: none; ICAO: LFAG

Summary
- Location: Estress Mons, France
- Elevation AMSL: 470 ft (140 m)
- Coordinates: 49°52′11″N 003°01′43″E

Map
- Location of Péronne-St Quentin Airfield

Runways
Direction	Length		Surface
Direction	ft	m	Surface
09/27	4,560	1,390	Composite

Péronne-St Quentin Airfield (ICAO: LFAG) is a recreational aerodrome in France, located 18 km (11 mi) west of Saint-Quentin; 195 km (121 mi) north of Paris. It supports general aviation with no commercial airline service scheduled.

== History ==
Péronne Airport was a pre-World War II civil airport, consisting of a terminal, hangar, some support buildings and a grass airfield, serving the nearby city of Saint-Quentin.

=== German use during World War II ===
It was seized by the Germans in June 1940 during the early part of the Battle of France, however, the airport was not used by any Luftwaffe units for several years. Beginning in 1944, several Luftwaffe anti-aircraft units, Flak-Regiment 87 and Flak-Regiment 19 based their batteries of 8.8 cm (88mm) FlaK guns at the site.

In addition, the Germans laid down two 1,500 m (4,900 ft) all-weather concrete runways at the airport, aligned 04/22 and 09/27. Presumably, this was due to the fortification of the Pas-de-Calais, being believed by the Germans that when the Americans and British tried to land in France to open a Second Front, the airfield would have a key role in the defense of France.

Beginning in mid-June 1944, elements of the "Arctic Ocean (Eismeer) fighter wing", Jagdgeschwader 5 (JG 5) was assigned to the airfield, with Messerschmitt Bf 109G day interceptor fighters. From Péronne, JG 5 began attacking the USAAF Eighth Air Force heavy bomber fleets attacking targets in Occupied Europe and Germany. Previously not attacked by Allied bombers, the airport came under frequent attack by Ninth Air Force Martin B-26 Marauder medium bombers and Republic P-47 Thunderbolts mostly with 500-pound general-purpose bombs; unguided rockets and .50 caliber machine gun sweeps when Eighth Air Force heavy bombers (Boeing B-17 Flying Fortresses, Consolidated B-24 Liberators) were within interception range of the Luftwaffe aircraft assigned to the base. The attacks were timed to have the maximum effect possible to keep the interceptors pinned down on the ground and unable to attack the heavy bombers.

=== American use ===
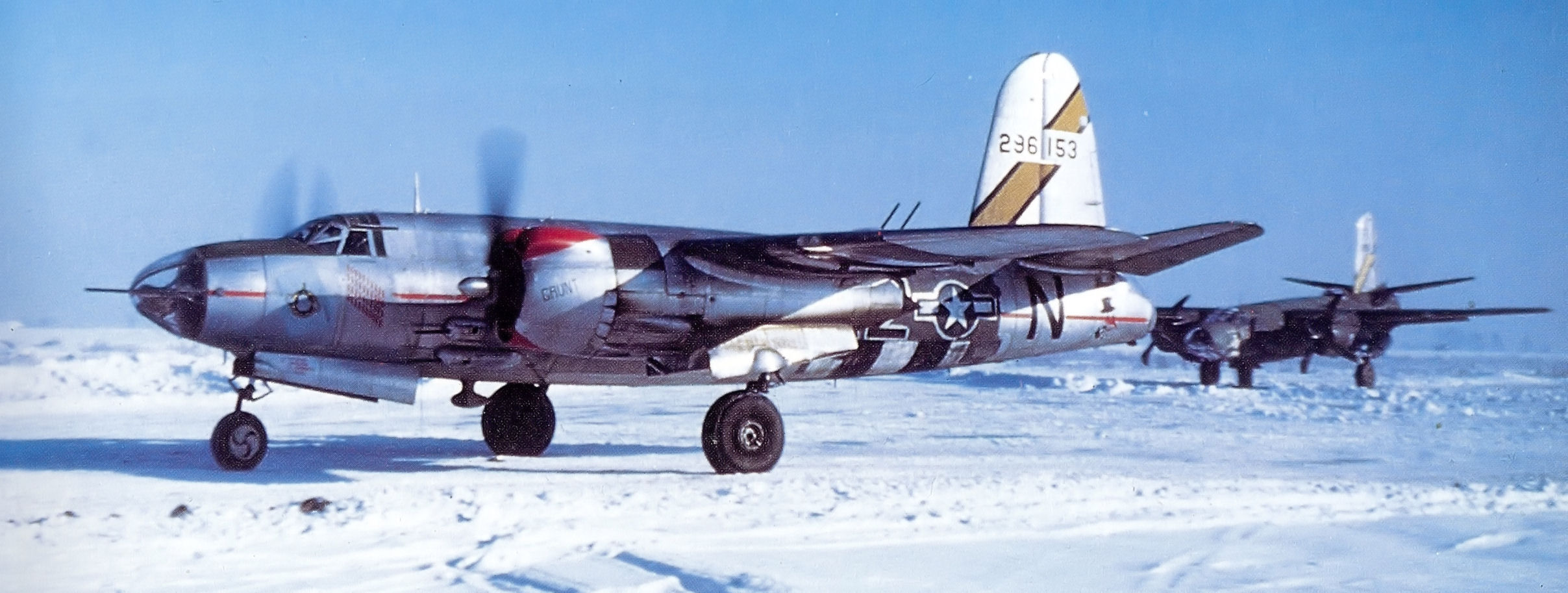
397th Bombardment Group Martin B-26B-55-MA Marauder 42-96153 at Péronne Advanced Landing Ground (ALG) A-72, January 1945.

American Ninth Army units moved through the area in early September 1944, heading towards Saint-Quentin. On 5 September, the IX Engineer Command 862d Engineer Aviation Battalion moved in and began a quick rehabilitation of the base so it could be used by American aircraft. It was declared operationally ready for Ninth Air Force combat units on 6 September, only a few days after its capture from German forces, being designated as Advanced Landing Ground "A-72 Peronne Airfield"

In addition to the airfield, tents were used for billeting and also for support facilities; an access road was built to the existing road infrastructure; a dump for supplies, ammunition, and gasoline drums, along with a drinkable water supply and minimal electrical grid for communications and station lighting. It hosted the following known Ninth Air Force units:

- 474th Fighter Group, - September-1 October 1944 Lockheed P-38 Lightning
- 397th Bombardment Group, 6 October 1944 – 25 April 1945 Martin B-26 Marauder

When the combat units moved out, Péronne was turned over to Air Technical Service Command, becoming an Air Depot and a storage depot for large numbers of surplus aircraft, whose units had returned to the United States via ship. Péronne Air Base was turned over to the French Air Ministry on 30 June 1945.

=== Postwar/NATO use ===
In French control after the war, the airport sat abandoned for years. There was much unexploded ordnance at the site which needed to be removed, as well as the wreckage of German and Allied aircraft. All of the buildings at the base were destroyed by the Allied air attacks or demolition, and although some had been repaired by the American combat engineers, most were in ruins. The French Air Force had no interest in the facility, and there was no money available to restore and rebuilt the prewar airport. As a result, the Air Ministry leased the land, concrete runways, structures and all, out to farmers for agricultural use, sending in unexploded ordnance teams to remove the dangerous munitions.

In 1950, as a result of the Cold War threat of the Soviet Union, the air base at Péronne was offered to the United States Air Force by the French Air Ministry as part of their NATO commitment to establish a modern air force base at the site. NATO faced several problems when attempting to solve the air power survival equation. Planning for a Warsaw Pact first strike survival in both conventional and nuclear wars had to be considered. The main air bases were built on small parcels of land with very limited dispersal space. It was decided to use Péronne as an emergency "backup" airfield, known as Saint Quentin-Estres Air Base, consisting of a "bare bones" facility of a runway with minimal facilities intended for use by all NATO air forces to disperse their aircraft in case of war.

Beginning about 1954, French demolition companies returned to Péronne and began demolishing the structures and removing the wreckage of the World War II air base. French Army Explosive demolition teams were brought in to safely remove unexploded ordnance remaining from the war and the site was prepared for construction. A modern all-weather concrete NATO jet runway was laid down aligned 09/27 (east-west), with taxiways and dispersal areas for three fighter squadrons. The dispersals were designed in a circular marguerite system of hardstands which could be revetted later with earth for added aircraft protection. Typically, the marguerite consisted of 15 to 18 hardstands, with each hardstand capable of parking one or two aircraft, allowing the planes to be spaced approximately 150 ft (46 m) apart. Each squadron was assigned to a separate hangar/hardstand complex.

Other than the occasional touch-and-go landing of NATO (USAF) aircraft, Péronne Air Base was never used. With the French withdrawal from the integrated military component of NATO in 1967, the base was abandoned.

=== Return to civil use ===
With the abandonment of the facility by NATO, the airfield was acquired by the local government and redeveloped into a commercial airport. The marguerite dispersal hardstands were torn up and sold for hardcore aggregate, with a small part of the 22 end of the old wartime runway used for a parking ramp. A new terminal and small hangars for private aircraft were erected.

Today, the NATO runway and taxiway are used by the airport, however, the runway has been shortened, with about half its length as the active airport runway. The wartime 04/22 still exists in a very deteriorated condition, unused. It appears that much of the enclosing taxiway have been turned into agricultural roads.

== Modern skydive activity ==
Today, the skydiving dropzone of Paris is hosted here. Many skydiving clubs like Saut en Parachute Paris are using this dropzone for their activities. On a yearly basis, there are between 30 000 and 40 000 skydiving jumps, including tandem, PAC (the French AFF course) and individual solo jumps.

== See also ==
- Advanced Landing Ground
