= Ediger-Eller =

- Municipality
- Coat of arms

- Location of Ediger-Eller within Cochem-Zell district
- Interactive map of Ediger-Eller
- Location within Germany Location within Rhineland-Palatinate
- Coordinates: 50°5′53″N 7°9′3″E
- Country: Germany
- State: Rhineland-Palatinate
- District: Cochem-Zell
- Municipal assoc.: Cochem

Government
  - Mayor (2019–24): Bernhard Himmen (CDU)

Area
  - Total: 19.13 km^{2} (7.39 sq mi)
- Elevation: 99 m (325 ft)

Population (2025-12-31)
  - Total: 886
  - Density: 46.3/km^{2} (120/sq mi)
- Time zone: UTC+01:00 (CET)
  - Summer (DST): UTC+02:00 (CEST)
- Postal codes: 56814
- Dialling codes: 02675
- Vehicle registration: COC
- Website: www.ediger-eller.de

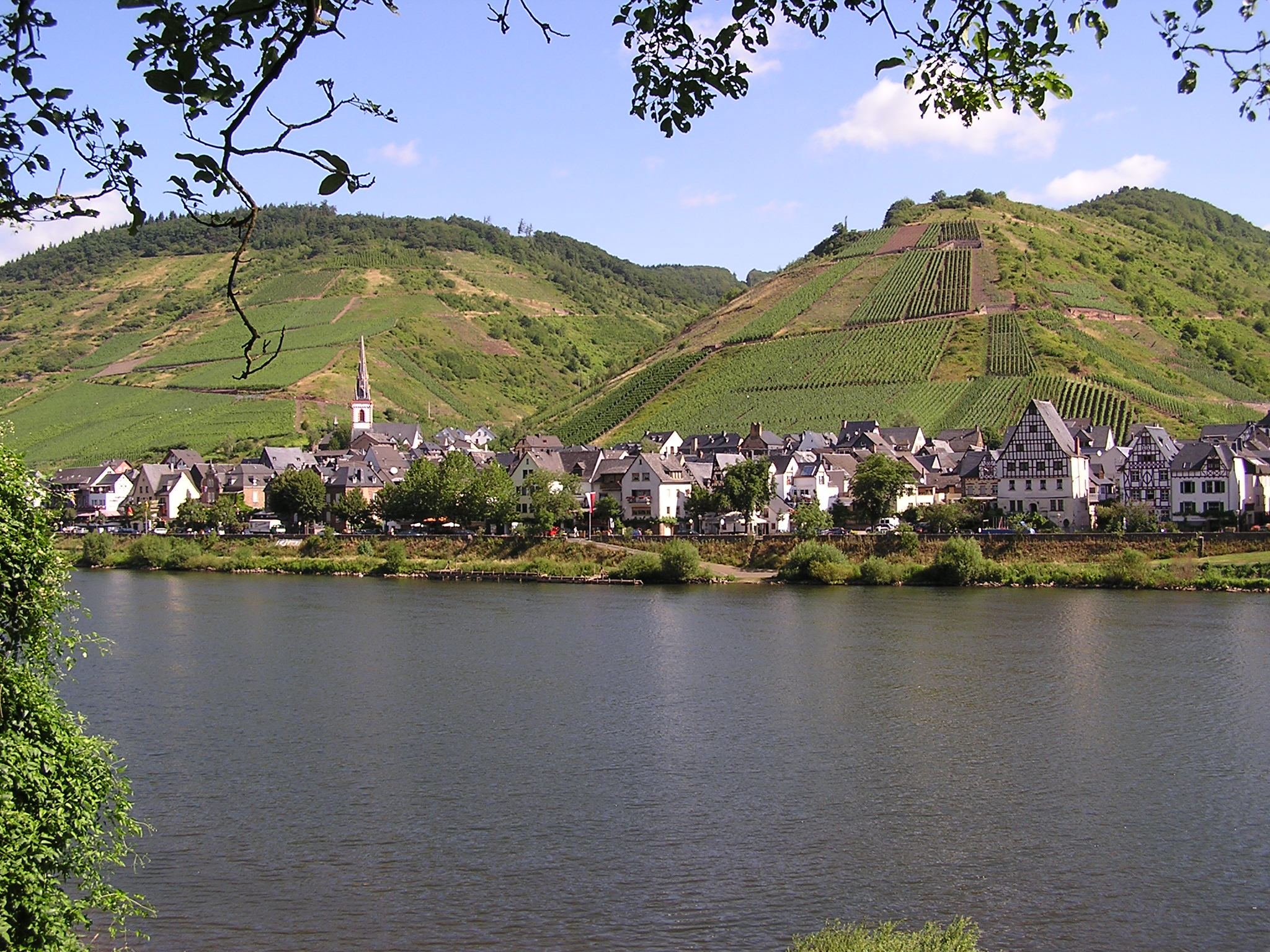
Ediger

Ediger-Eller is an Ortsgemeinde – a municipality belonging to a Verbandsgemeinde, a kind of collective municipality – in the Cochem-Zell district in Rhineland-Palatinate, Germany. It belongs to the Verbandsgemeinde of Cochem, whose seat is in the like-named town.

== Geography ==
Ediger-Eller lies on the river Moselle. The constituent community of Eller is found at the foot of the Calmont.

== History ==
The two constituent communities have a history that, according to a documentary mention, stretches at least as far back as the year 639. Potsherds that have been found, which came from a Roman factory near Trier suggest that the municipality may have existed as early as the 2nd or 3rd century AD.

Even older traces of settlement – remnants of a stone wall of a flight castle from Celtic times – can be found on the Hochkessel, the mountain on the other side of the Moselle. On the side of the Moselle facing towards the Hunsrück is a Roman-Gaulish burying ground near Saint Peter's Chapel (Peters-Kapelle) in Neef.

The sparse remnants of a Roman legion's garrison outpost can be found in the heights of the Calmont.

The constituent community of Eller was as early as the 5th century, in Merovingian times, the seat of a monastery consecrated to Saint Fridolin. Built onto the Late Romanesque tower is a Baroque nave with fine furnishings, among them a Stumm organ. In Saint Arnulf's Chapel across the street hangs the picture Verspottung Christi (“Mocking of Christ”) from the 15th century, after a drawing by Martin Schongauer. The Pyrmont and Electoral-Trier manor houses from the 16th century, today the ancestral seat of the Barons of Landenberg-Trimborn, underscore Eller's former importance.

Behind the railway bridge, with a slope of 65%, rises the Calmont, whose south side is the world's steepest vineyard, reaching a height of 378 m. A hike up the via ferrata to the mountain ridge is among the most impressive experiences on the Moselle. On the other side, on the former Insula Sankt Nicolai, stands the ruin of a convent church that once belonged to the Stuben Augustinian convent, founded in 1137. From 1208 to 1788, it housed the famous Limburger Staurothek, a reliquary that is important to art history, allegedly containing bits of the Cross on which Jesus was crucified. Today, it is part of the Limburg cathedral treasury.

Beginning in 1794, Ediger and Eller lay under French rule and were merged to form a single municipality. In 1815 they were assigned to the Kingdom of Prussia at the Congress of Vienna, and once again became two separate municipalities. Since 1877, Eller has lain near the end of the Kaiser-Wilhelm-Tunnel, which begins in Cochem and is named after Emperor Wilhelm I (not his grandson, Wilhelm II). From the time of its completion until 1987, it was Germany's longest railway tunnel at 4 205 m. The tunnel is part of the Moselstrecke (Moselle line). Not far from the tunnel portal, and before the Moselle bridge, stands Ediger-Eller railway station.

Beginning in 1946, the two municipalities were part of the then newly founded state of Rhineland-Palatinate. On 7 June 1969, in the course of administrative restructuring in Rhineland-Palatinate, Ediger and Eller were once again merged to form a single municipality.

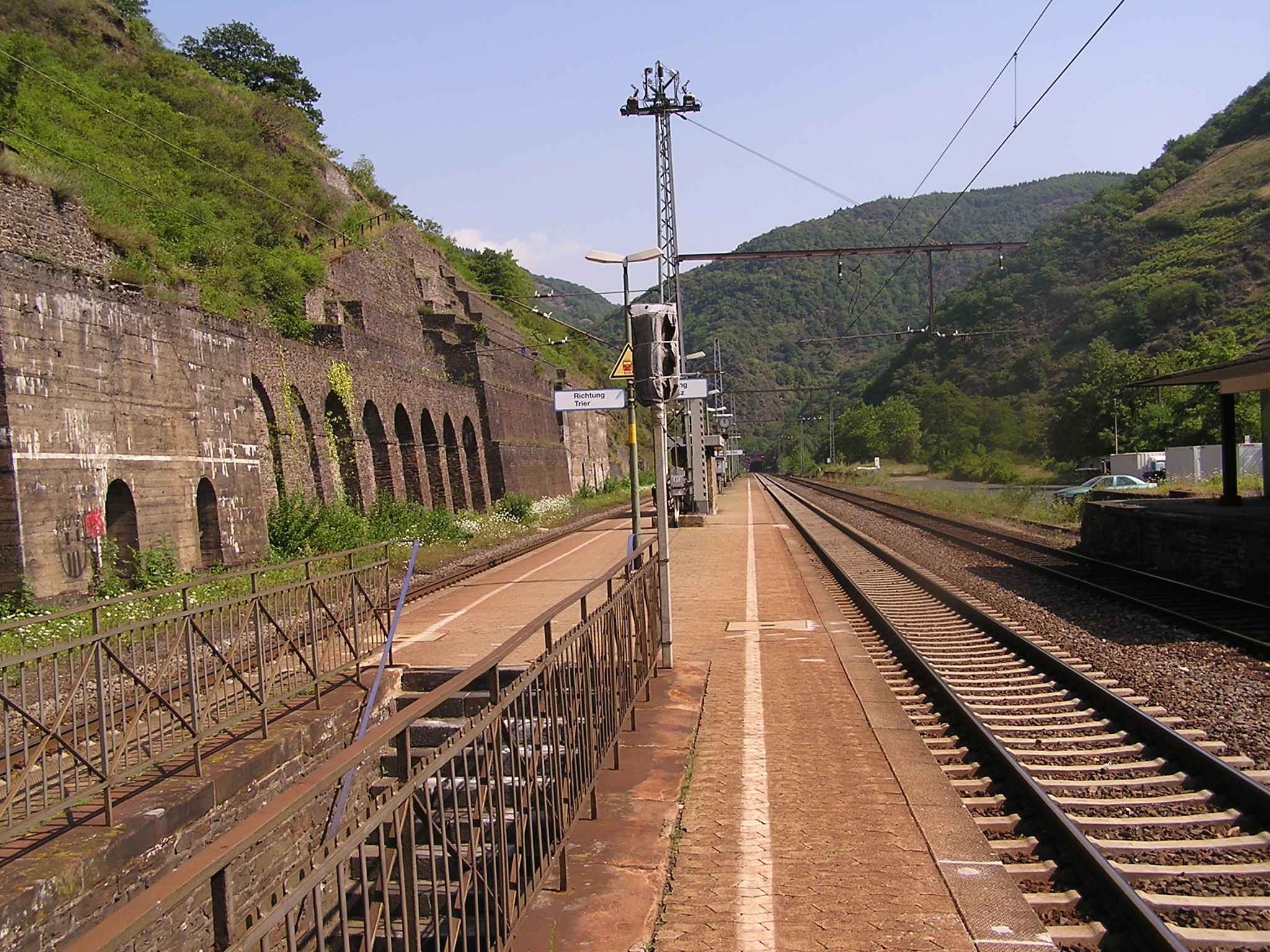
Ediger-Eller railway station, tunnel portal in the background

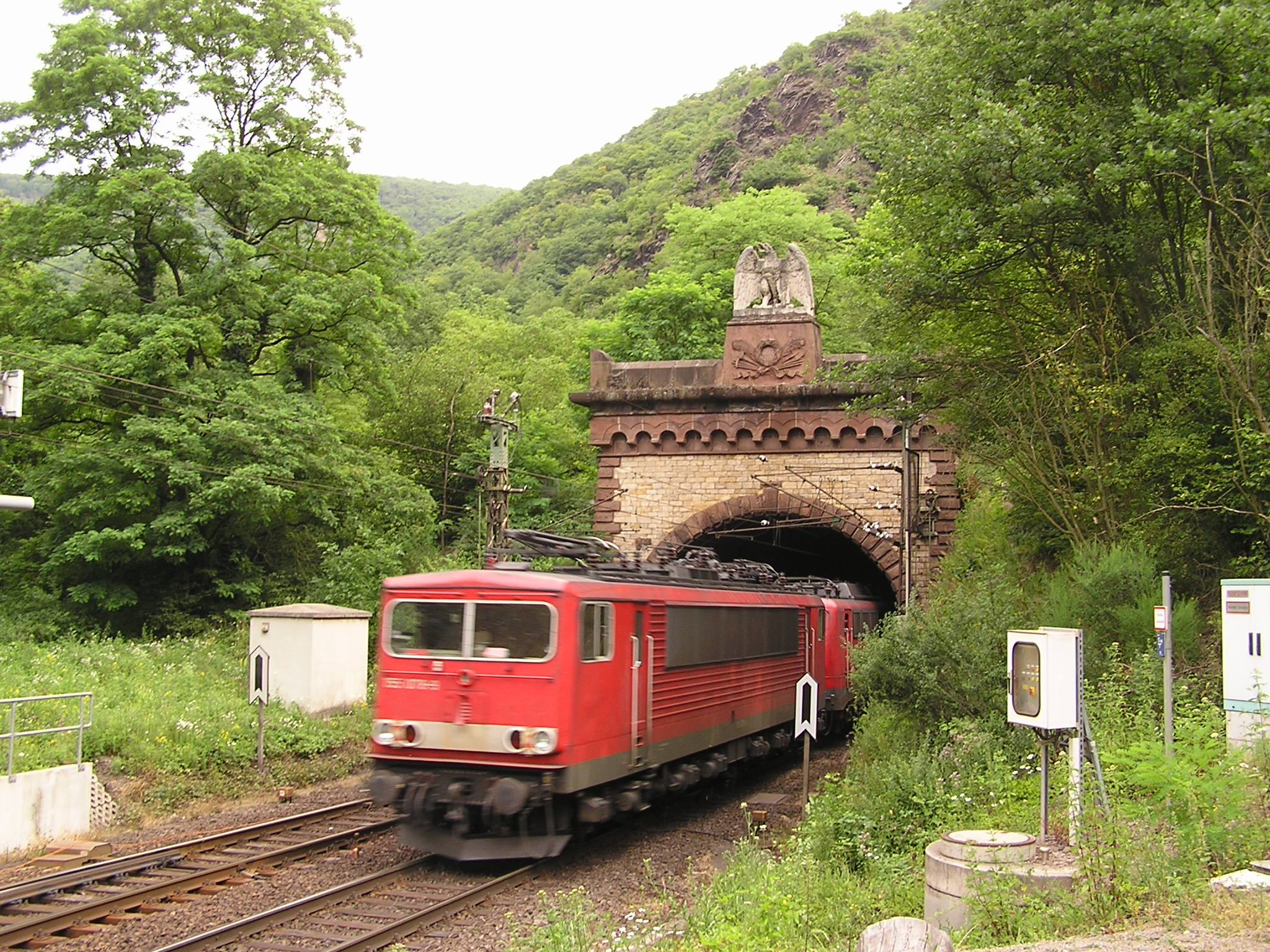
Tunnel portal near Eller

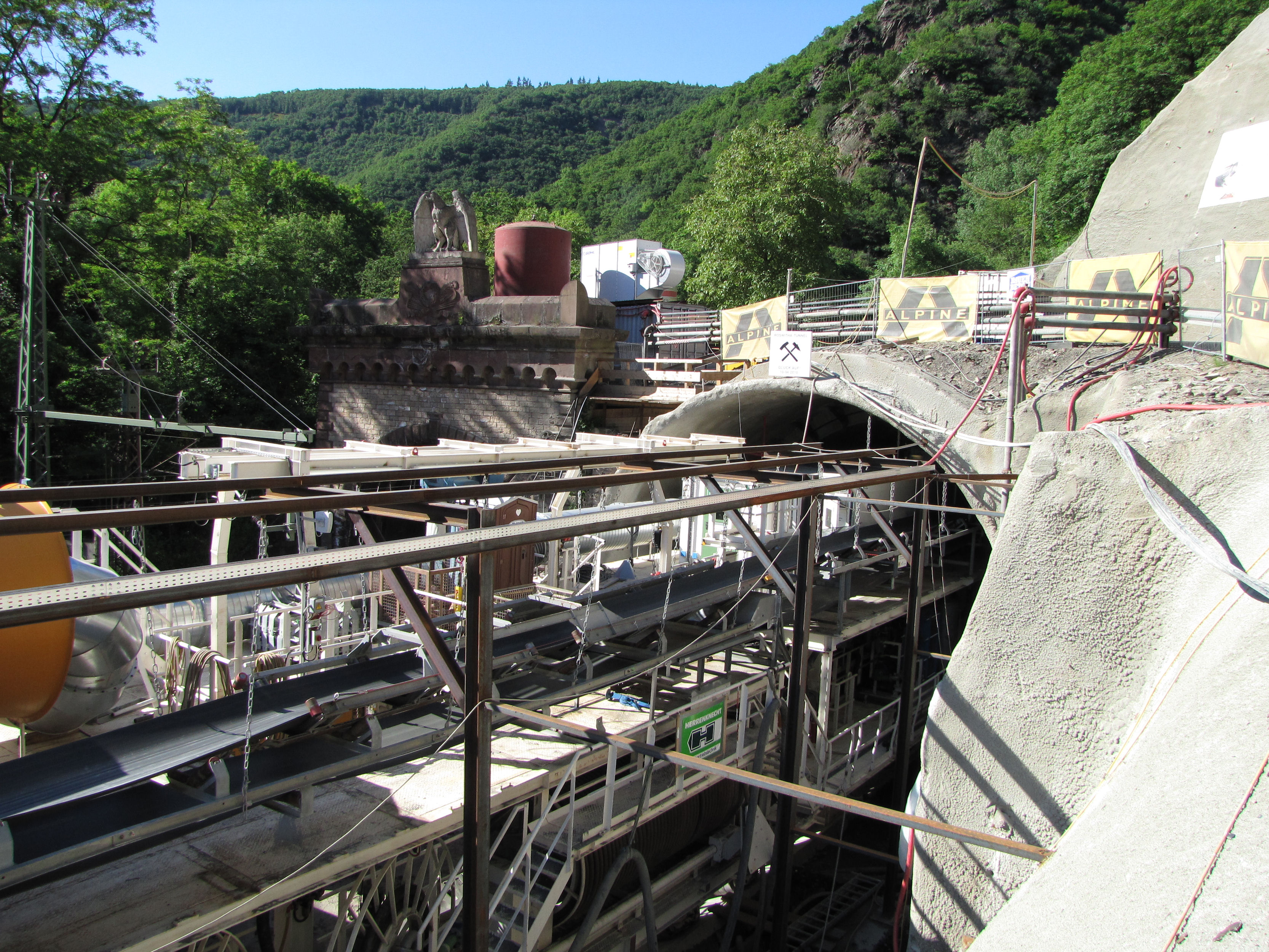
Kaiser-Wilhelm-Tunnel near Eller, building of the second bore, June 2010

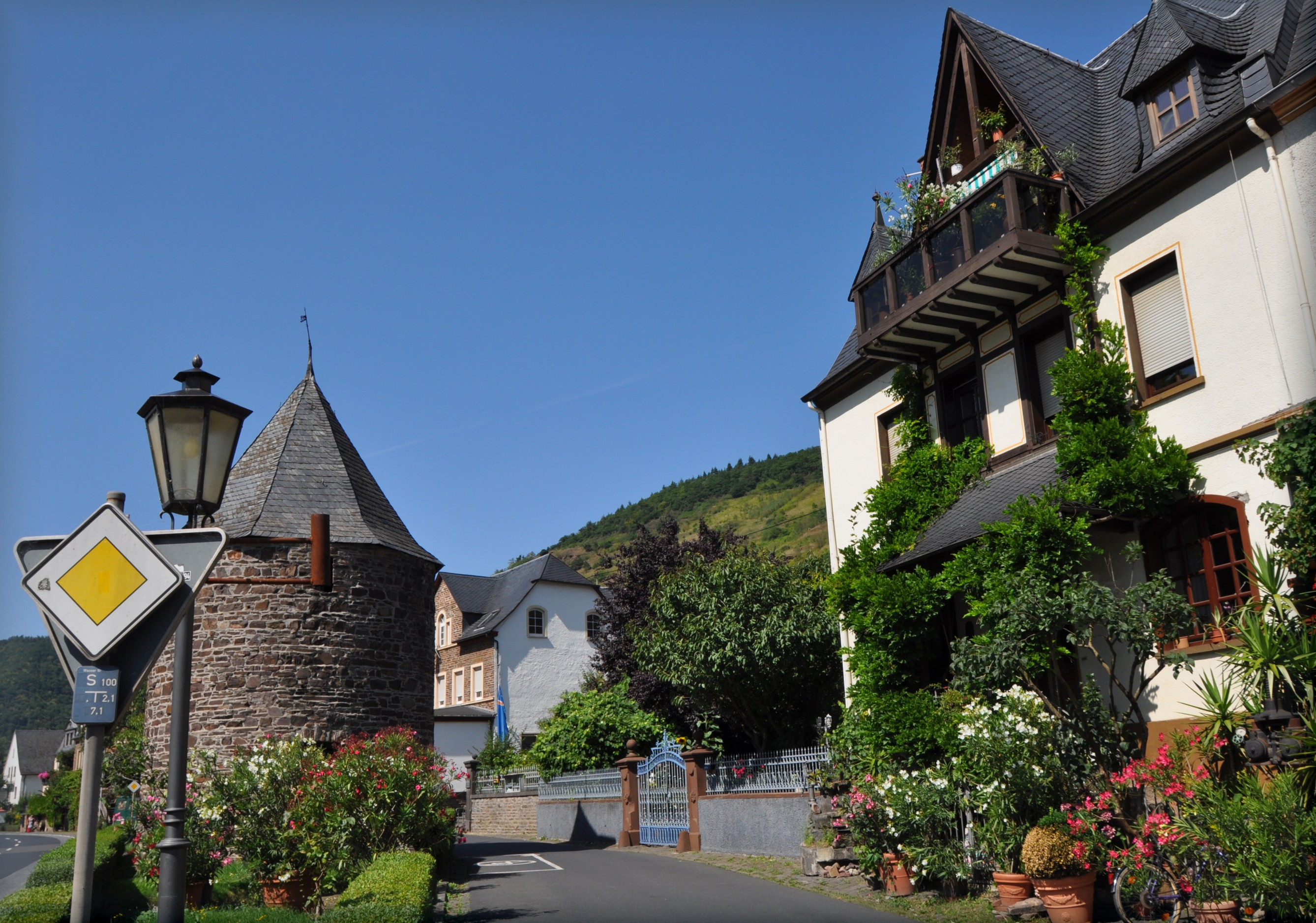
Cultural monument, the Ediger Oberturm

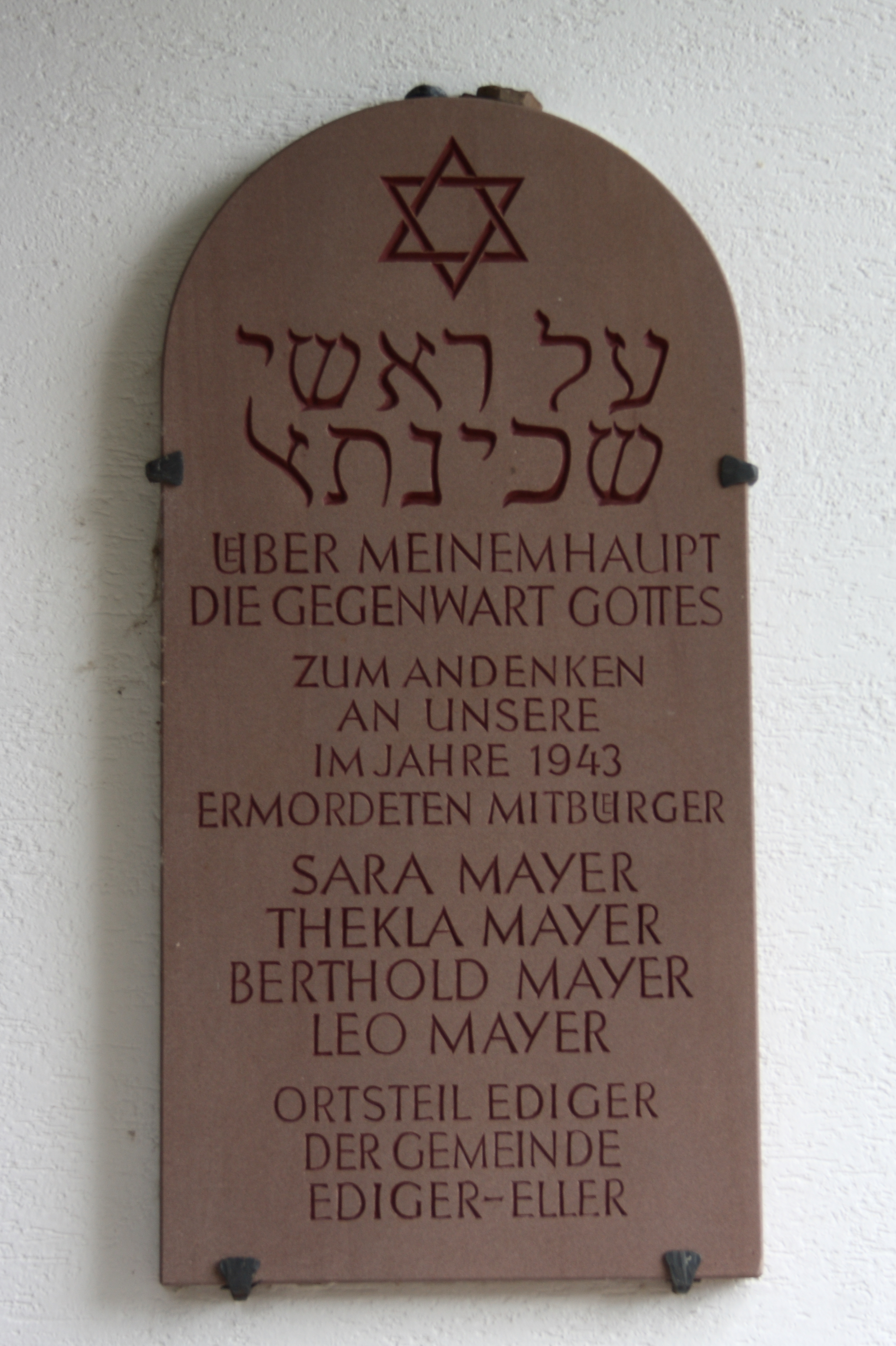
Holocaust Memorial plaque in the cemetery in Ediger

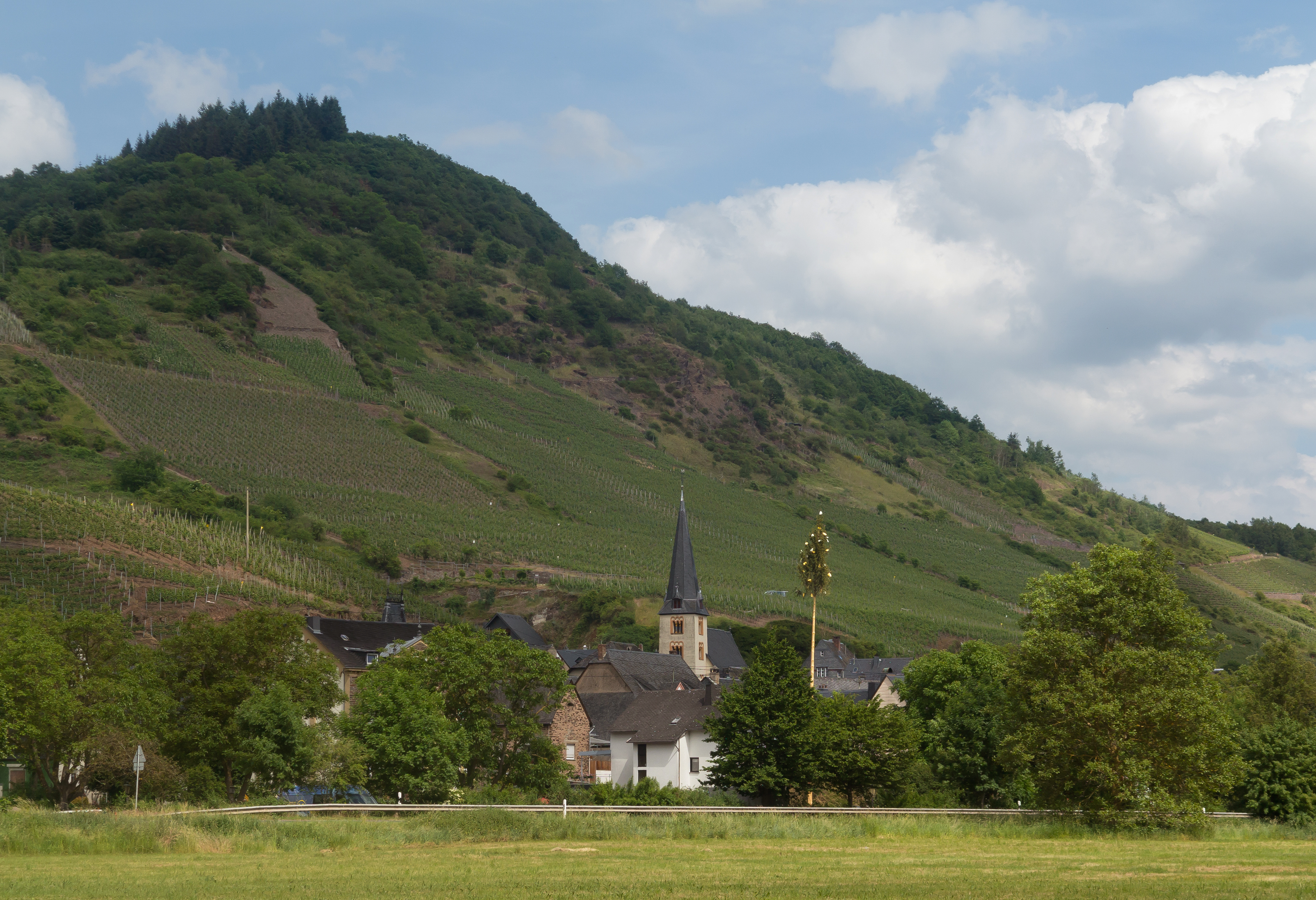
Catholich church (Pfarrkirche Sankt Hilarius) in Eller

== Politics ==
=== Municipal council ===
The council is made up of 16 council members, who were elected by proportional representation at the municipal election held on 7 June 2009, and the honorary mayor as chairwoman.

The municipal election held on 7 June 2009 yielded the following results:

Year	CDU	FWG	Total
2009	9	7	16 seats
2004	5	11	16 seats

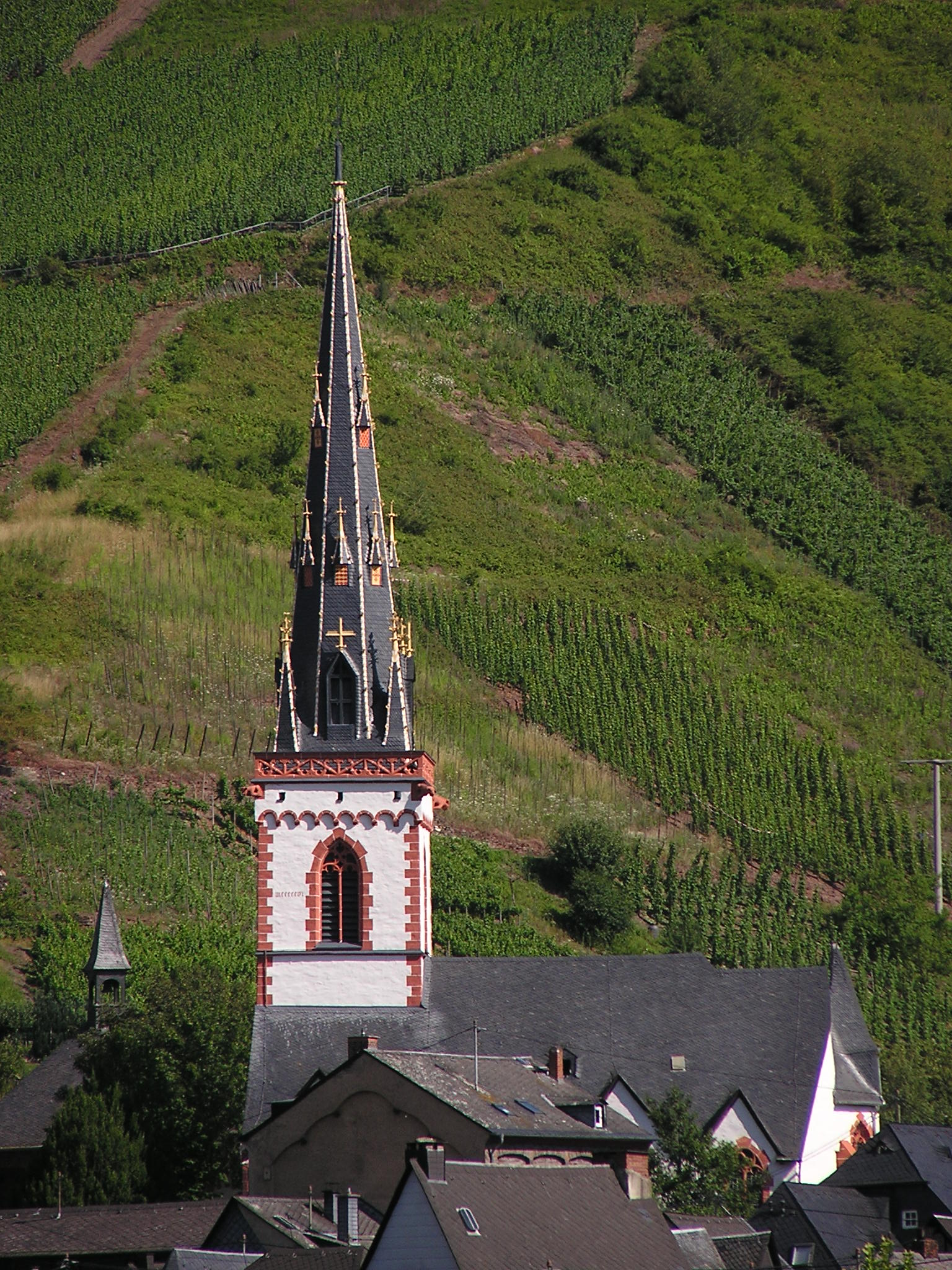
Saint Martin's Church in Ediger

=== Mayor ===
Ediger-Eller's mayor is Bernhard Himmen.

=== Coat of arms ===
The municipality's arms might be described thus: Per pale vert a vine palewise embowed to dexter in chief leafed of three and fructed of one, all Or, and argent a cross enhanced gules.

== Culture and sightseeing ==
=== Buildings ===
The following are listed buildings or sites in Rhineland-Palatinate’s Directory of Cultural Monuments:

==== Ediger ====
- Ediger village centre (monumental zone) – streets and buildings within the whole town wall with moat
- Saint Martin’s Catholic Parish Church (Pfarrkirche St. Martin), Kirchstraße – two-naved hall church, about 1506-1512/1518, sacristy from the 16th century, expansion 1951/52; outside: baptismal font, about 1100; cross, late 15th century; graveyard: old wall, five cast-iron grave crosses, late 19th century, Rheinböllen Ironworks; whole complex of buildings
- So-called Meinradskapelle, Moselweinstraße/corner of Kapellenstraße – pilgrimage chapel to the Mother of God, staggered aisleless church, from 1666-1667
- Town wall (monumental zone) – 1362 leave to fortify the village, 1459 first mentioned; rectangular wallworks (on the side facing the mountains from the parish church to the Lohmühle), wall on Hochstraße; gate at the church, on the side facing the mountains arrow slits as well as remnants of a half-round tower; at the northeast corner a half-round open-backed defensive tower (Schalenturm) “Vinum bonum”; the wall runs parallel to Kapellenstraße to the Unterer Turm (“Lower Tower”) up at the Meinharduskapelle; on the west side of Moselstraße 18/19 town gate with Late Gothic portal, house of the bakers’ guild and the Brotherhood of Saint Anne, 1567; no. 19 archway frieze, late mediaeval portal; second tower on Moselstraße, there also town wall remnants, along whose course on Oberbachstraße a further open-backed defensive tower
- Way of the Cross, Bergstraße (monumental zone) – Baroque Stations of the Cross, Bildstock type, 1762
- Bergstraße – Bildstock, with Crucifixion group, 18th century
- Eulenstraße (no number) – building with mansard roof, 20th century
- Eulenstraße 5 – former Klausener Hof; three-floor timber-frame house, partly solid, plastered, essentially from the 16th century
- Hochstraße – well
- Hochstraße 1 – timber-frame house, partly solid, half-hipped roof, from 1549
- Hochstraße 3 – timber-frame house, partly solid, balloon frame, from 1543
- Hochstraße 4 – former estate of Steinfeld Abbey; Baroque building with hipped mansard roof, 18th century
- Hochstraße 5 – three-floor timber-frame house, partly solid, plastered, 17th century; characteristic of the village's appearance
- Hochstraße 9 – timber-frame house, partly solid, essentially from the 16th century
- Hochstraße 14 – timber-frame house, partly solid, half-hipped roof, 16th century, alterations in the 17th or 18th century
- Hochstraße 16 – timber-frame house, partly solid, essentially possibly from the 16th century, conversion in the 18th century
- Hochstraße 18 – timber-frame house, partly solid, hipped mansard roof, from 1826, essentially from the late 16th century, expansion in the 18th century
- Hochstraße 19 – winemaker's house; quarrystone building, early 20th century
- Hochstraße 20 – timber-frame house, partly solid, plastered, hipped mansard roof, from 1812, essentially possibly from the 16th or 17th century
- Hochstraße 26 – timber-frame house, partly solid, plastered, half-hipped roof, 18th century
- Hochstraße 28 – timber-frame house, partly solid, half-hipped roof, from 1628
- Hochstraße 35 – former winepress house; timber-frame house, partly solid, half-hipped roof, from 1699
- Hochstraße 35 – three-floor timber-frame house, partly solid, plastered, hipped mansard roof, from 1735 and 1783/1785
- Hochstraße 37 – timber-frame house, partly solid, from 1614, essentially possibly older
- Kapellenstraße 6 – timber-frame house, partly solid, plastered, half-hipped roof, 17th century
- Kapellenstraße 8 – timber-frame house, partly solid, 16th century, addition in the 19th century
- Kirchstraße – sculpture of Christ the Saviour, 18th century, set into a wall
- Kirchstraße 4/6 – Baroque plastered building, 18th century; next to it a solid building, partly timber-frame, half-hipped roof, 17th century (?)
- Kirchstraße 10 – timber-frame house, 16th century
- Kirchstraße 15 – former Springiersbach estate and rectory; timber-frame house, plastered, mansard roof, 18th century; entrance gate, well
- Kuhgasse – winepress house, quarrystone building, partly timber-frame, possibly from the 19th century
- Moselweinstraße 11 – three-floor richly adorned timber-frame house, partly solid, half-hipped roof, from 1657
- Moselweinstraße 12 – three-floor timber-frame house, partly solid, 16th century
- Moselweinstraße 13 – former Electoral Amtshaus; three-floor timber-frame house, partly solid, from 1515, Archbishop Richard von Greiffenklau zu Vollrads's (1511-1531) heraldic escutcheon
- Moselweinstraße 20 – former mayor's house, stately quarrystone building, about 1870/1880
- Nikolausstraße 5 – three-floor timber-frame house, partly solid, plastered, 16th century
- Nikolausstraße 7 – timber-frame house, partly solid, balloon frame, 16th century
- Nikolausstraße 14 – timber-frame house, partly solid, plastered, from 1614, possibly expanded later
- Oberbachstraße 1 – solid building, from 1582, behind it a timber-frame house, partly solid, from 1600
- Oberbachstraße 2 – three-floor timber-frame house, partly solid, mid to late 17th century
- Oberbachstraße 3 – plastered timber-frame house, 17th century
- Oberbachstraße 4 – three-floor richly adorned timber-frame house, partly solid, from 1623
- Oberbachstraße 10 – U-shaped complex; timber-frame house, plastered, early 19th century; plastered building with Renaissance tower, from 1584; so-called Sälchen (“Little Room”), plastered building, 16th century; barn
- Oberbachstraße 12 – quarrystone building, from 1820s?
- (hinter) Oberbachstraße 15 – plastered quarrystone building, from 1589
- Oberbachstraße 17 – timber-frame house, partly solid, plastered, 16th century
- Oberbachstraße 18 – timber-frame house, partly solid, half-hipped roof, 16th century
- Oberbachstraße 19 – timber-frame house, partly solid, essentially from the 16th century, knee wall from the 19th century
- Oberbachstraße 20 – three-floor timber-frame house, partly solid, plastered, essentially possibly from the 16th century, uppermost floor added in the 19th century
- Oberbachstraße 22 – timber-frame house, partly solid, sided, essentially possibly from the 16th or 17th century
- Oberbachstraße 24 – niche relief, 18th century
- Oberbachstraße 30 – timber-frame house, partly solid, plastered, 18th century, essentially possibly older
- Paulusstraße – Gotisches Haus; Gothic solid building, abuts Oberbachstraße 16
- Paulusstraße 1 – timber-frame house, partly solid, balloon frame, half-hipped roof, from 1517
- Paulusstraße 2 – niche relief, 18th century
- Paulusstraße 3 – big building with hipped mansard roof, essentially possibly Baroque, alterations in the 1920s/1930s
- Paulusstraße 5 – three-floor timber-frame house, partly solid, early 16th century; bridge gate, timber framing; timber-frame house, 16th century
- Paulusstraße 7 – Trier Cathedral Provost's estate; Baroque timber-frame house, partly solid, hipped mansard roof, 18th century
- Pelzerstraße 1 – three-floor timber-frame house, partly solid, half-hipped roof, from 1623, essentially older
- Pelzerstraße 4 – stately timber-frame house, partly solid, 18th century, essentially possibly older
- Pelzerstraße 8 – plastered building, 16th or 17th century
- Pelzerstraße 14 – plastered timber-frame house, 18th century
- Pelzerstraße 22 – three-floor timber-frame house, partly solid, half-hipped roof, latter half of the 16th century
- Perstraße – wayside cross, from 1667
- Pützstraße 5 – timber-frame house, partly solid, half-hipped roof, 17th century
- Pützstraße 7 – timber-frame house, partly solid, mansard roof, 18th century
- Raiffeisenstraße 7 – three-floor timber-frame house, partly solid, 16th century
- Raiffeisenstraße 9 – plastered timber-frame house, partly solid, 18th century; abutting solid building above archway frieze
- Raiffeisenstraße 9a – timber-frame house, partly solid, 16th century
- Rathausstraße – coat of arms
- Rathausstraße 1 – timber-frame house, partly solid, half-hipped roof, 17th century; timber-frame addition from the 18th century; previous location of Jewish synagogue
- Rathausstraße 8 -- House of Psalms (Haus der Psalmen), Former Jewish synagogue and school built in the mid-19th century; desecrated during Kristallnacht but now restored and "serv[ing] as a place of remembrance and contemplation as well as a respectful encounter in the awareness of the common roots of Jewish and Christian faith."
- Rathausstraße 9 – timber-frame house, partly solid, Late Gothic portal with relief, 16th century
- Rathausstraße 13 – timber-frame house, partly solid, plastered, essentially from the 16th century
- Unterbachstraße 2 – timber-frame house, partly solid, essentially possibly from the 17th century, knee wall from the 19th century
- Unterbachstraße 5 – solid building, 17th or 18th century
- Unterbachstraße 7 – timber-frame house, partly solid, possibly from the 16th or 17th century
- On Bundesstraße 49, in the vineyard – wayside cross, from 1783
- On Bundesstraße 49, going towards Nehren – Heiligenhäuschen (a small, shrinelike structure consecrated to a saint or saints); relief with Crucifixion group, from 1788
- On Bundesstraße 49 – wayside cross, from 1835
- On the other side of the Moselle – wooden lookout pavilion
- On Kreisstraße (District Road) 19, north of Ediger – chapel; plastered building, 19th century
- Lehmen Estate, on Bundesstraße 49 – ruin of a Romanesque residential tower, dendrochronologically dated to 1233-1234
- Cross chapel with Way of the Cross; Baroque Way of the Cross, 15 stations; some from 1762; Cross chapel, aisleless church, from 1498, expansion 1704-1707

==== Eller ====
- Saint Hilarius's Catholic Parish Church (Pfarrkirche St. Hilarius), Bachstraße – Romanesque west tower, Late Gothic cupola, Gothic Revival quire, possibly from the latter half of the 17th century, Baroque aisleless church, from 1718
- Bachstraße – street chapel; open wood construction, from 1784; missionary cross, from 1733; fountain spout, late 18th century
- Bachstraße – former Saint Roch’s Chapel (Rochuskapelle); Baroque aisleless church, three-sided end wall about 1500; grave cross, from 1733
- Bachstraße 13 – door with fanlight, about 1828
- Bachstraße 15 – door with fanlight, about 1817
- Bachstraße 16 – former school; quarrystone building with timber-frame addition, late 19th century
- Bachstraße 21 – former rectory; three-floor timber-frame house, partly solid and slated, from 1903
- Bachstraße 22 – timber-frame house, partly solid, 18th century
- Brunnenstraße 17 – timber-frame house, partly solid, essentially from the 16th century; three-floor timber-frame house, partly solid, essentially older, uppermost floor built in the 19th century
- Brunnenstraße 18 – timber-frame house, partly solid, plastered, 17th century
- Brunnenstraße 19 – building with combined end wall and gable, possibly from the 16th century
- Brunnenstraße 20 – timber-frame house, partly solid, 18th century
- Brunnenstraße 26 – timber-frame house, partly solid, half-hipped roof, 16th century
- Brunnenstraße 30 – timber-frame house, partly solid, balloon frame, 16th century
- Brunnenstraße 33 – Gothic window jamb
- Brunnenstraße 39 – cellar portal, from 1580
- Brunnenstraße 43 – former Pyrmont estate; building with two wings, outdoor stairway, from 1578 and 1582
- Moselweinstraße 59 – former Electoral wine cellar, called Freidthof; late mediaeval solid building, partly timber-frame, from 1641, alterations up to the 19th century; winepress house, timber-frame building, partly solid, from 1585; collection of hearth heating plates, 16th and 17th centuries
- Moselweinstraße 62 – three-floor timber-frame house, partly solid, half-hipped roof, from 1556, dendrochronologically dated to 1531-1532
- Moselweinstraße 67 – winemaker's villa; quarrystone building, about 1900
- Moselweinstraße 88 – villa; quarrystone building with tower, from 1879
- Neustraße 14 – timber-frame house, partly solid, 18th century, essentially possibly from the 16th or 17th century
- Across the street from Plattertstraße 1 – Kellerei Eller; one-floor wine cellar building, Art Nouveau, from 1913
- St. Jakobstraße 3/5 – three-winged quarrystone double house, 19th century
- St. Jakobstraße 15 – timber-frame house, partly solid, 18th century
- Uckertstraße 12 – plastered building, 18th century (?)
- Uckertstraße 16 – timber-frame house, partly solid, 18th or 19th century
- Portal of the Kaiser-Wilhelm-Tunnel, sandstone blocks, from 1877

== Economy and infrastructure ==
The most important branches of the economy are winegrowing and tourism. Raised in the vineyards is mainly Riesling. One of the local winemaking locations is Ediger Osterlämmchen.

== Famous people ==
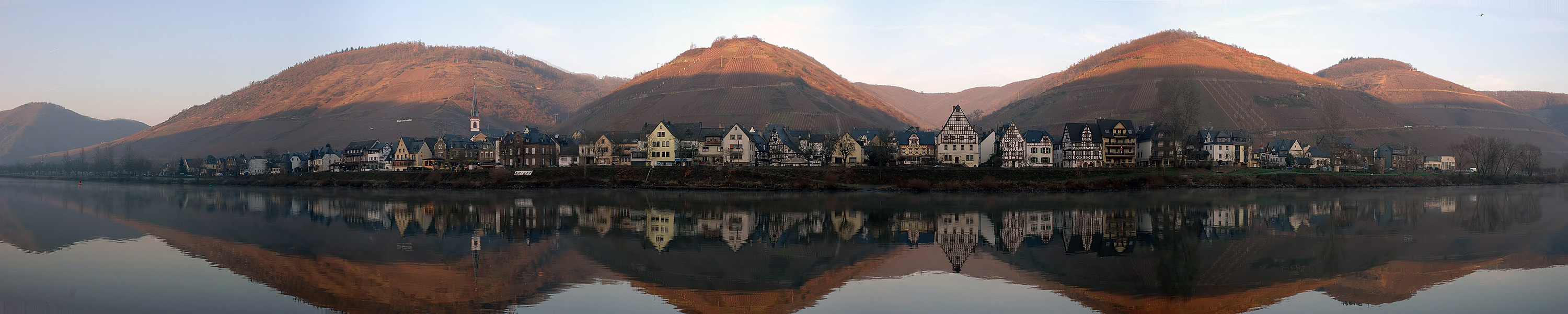
Panoramic view of Ediger

=== Sons and daughters of the town ===
- Eduard David, German politician (SPD), Member of the Reichstag, Member of the Hesse Landtag, Minister of the Interior
