= 737th Expeditionary Airlift Squadron =

737th Expeditionary Airlift Squadron

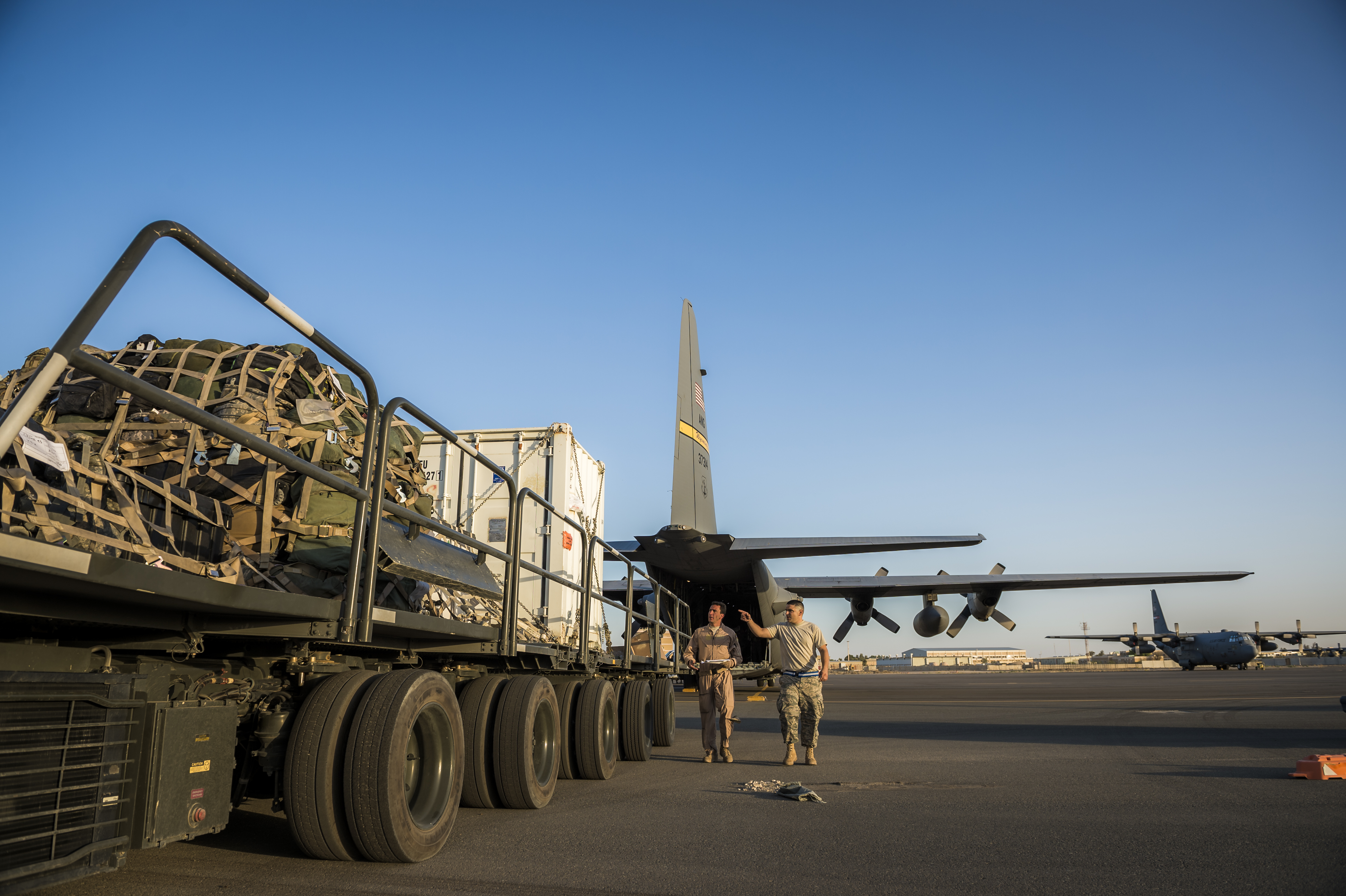
- Squadron airmen loading a C-130 Hercules in Southwest Asia
- Active: 1943-1945; 1947-1949; 1952-1953; 2000s
- Country: United States
- Branch: United States Air Force
- Role: Airlift
- Nickname: Desert Foxes
- Engagements: Mediterranean Theater of Operations; Iraq War; Operation Inherent Resolve
- Decorations: Distinguished Unit Citation; Air Force Meritorious Unit Award

Commanders
- Current commander: Lt. Col. Gary Dodge

Insignia
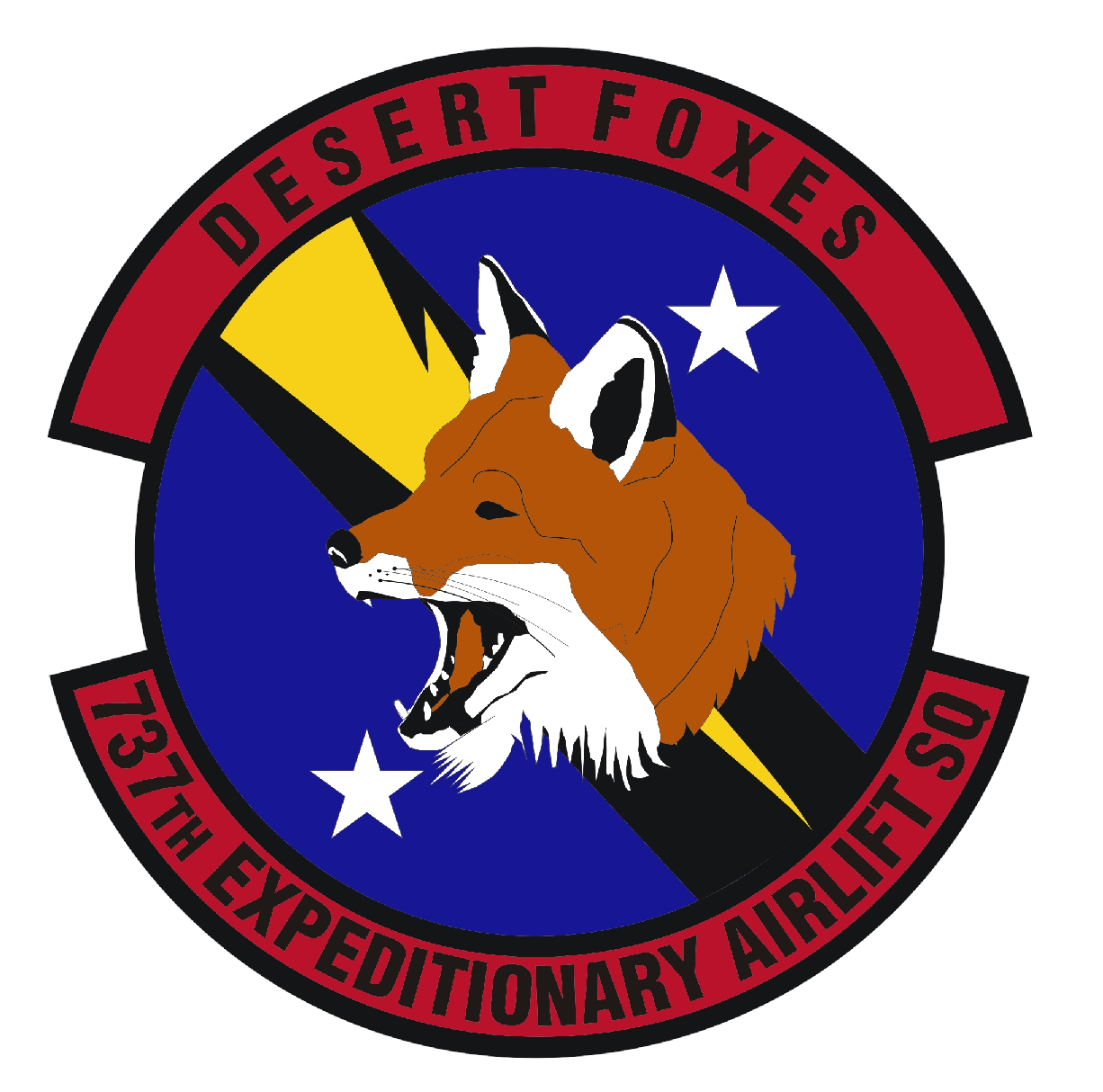
- 737 Expeditionary Airlift Squadron emblem

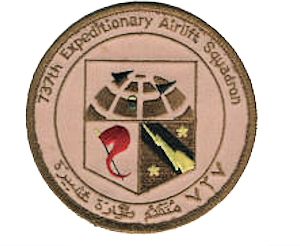
- Squadron morale patch (Note: This patch is based on the World War II emblem of the 454th Bombardment Group. Watkins, pp. 98-99.)

The 737th Expeditionary Airlift Squadron is a provisional United States Air Force unit assigned to Air Combat Command (ACC) to activate or inactivate as needed. It operates Lockheed C-130 Hercules aircraft moving personnel and equipment in the Middle East, recently from Ali Al Salem Air Base in Kuwait. Its current status and duty location is undetermined.

The squadron was first activated as the 737th Bombardment Squadron in June 1943. After training in the United States with the Consolidated B-24 Liberator, it deployed to the Mediterranean Theater of Operations, participating in the strategic bombing campaign against Germany. It earned two Distinguished Unit Citations for its combat operations. Following V-E Day, it returned to the United States for conversion as a very heavy bomber unit, but was inactivated instead.

The squadron was activated in the reserves in 1947, but was not fully manned or equipped before inactivating in 1949. In 1952 it was redesignated the 737th Troop Carrier Squadron and again activated in the reserve, but was inactivated the following year and its personnel and equipment transferred to another unit. It was converted to provisional status in 2002 and assigned to Air Mobility Command. It was reassigned to ACC in 2003.

== History ==
=== World War II ===
The squadron was first activated at Alamogordo Army Air Field, New Mexico in mid-1943 as the 737th Bombardment Squadron, one of the four Consolidated B-24 Liberator heavy bombardment squadrons assigned to the 454th Bombardment Group. The unit trained under Second Air Force. After training in the United States, the squadron deployed to the Mediterranean Theater of Operations in late 1943 and was stationed at San Giovanni Airfield under Fifteenth Air Force.

The unit engaged in very long range strategic bombardment of enemy military, industrial and transportation targets. It initially flew some interdiction and ground support missions, participating in the drive to Rome. Most operations included attacks against such objectives as marshalling yards, aircraft factories, railroad bridges, and airdromes in Italy, Austria, and Romania. The squadron was awarded a Distinguished Unit Citation for an attack on an airfield at Bad Vöslau, Austria on 12 April 1944. It helped to prepare the way for and supported Operation Dragoon, the invasion of southern France, during July and August 1944. At the same time, expanded previous operations to include attacks on oil refineries and storage facilities, locomotive works, and viaducts in France, Germany, Czechoslovakia, Hungary, Austria, and in the Balkans. It earned a second Distinguished Unit Citation on 25 July when the 454th Group led the 304th Bombardment Wing through severe opposition in an attack on steel factories at Linz, Austria.

The squadron returned to the United States after VE Day in May 1945. It began to reorganize as a Boeing B-29 Superfortress very heavy bombardment squadron. It began training under Second Air Force in August 1945, but was inactivated in October after VJ Day.

=== Air Force reserve ===
The squadron was activated as a reserve unit under Air Defense Command (ADC) at McChord Field, Washington in July 1947, where its training was supervised by the 406th AAF Base Unit (later the 2345th Air Force Reserve Training Center). It was nominally a heavy bomber unit, but it is not clear whether it was fully manned or had any combat aircraft assigned. In 1948 Continental Air Command (ConAC) assumed responsibility for managing reserve and Air National Guard units from ADC. The 737th was inactivated when ConAC reorganized its reserve units under the wing base organization system in June 1949. The squadron's personnel and equipment were transferred to elements of the 302d Troop Carrier Wing, which was simultaneously activated at McChord. This reorganization was also impacted by President Truman's reduced 1949 defense budget, which required reductions in the number of units in the Air Force.

The reserve mobilization for the Korean War had left the reserve without aircraft, and the reserves did not receive aircraft again until July 1952. In preparing for the receipt of aircraft, in June 1952, ConAC activated the 454th Troop Carrier Wing at Portland International Airport, Oregon to replace the 922d Reserve Training Wing, the non-flying headquarters for reserve units there. The 737th was redesignated the 737th Troop Carrier Squadron and activated with the 454th Wing. It began training with Curtiss C-46 Commando transports. It was inactivated on 1 January 1953 with its personnel and equipment being reassigned to the 64th Troop Carrier Squadron when the 403d Troop Carrier Wing was released from active duty and replaced the 454th Wing as Portland's air reserve unit.

=== Expeditionary airlift ===
The squadron was converted to provisional status and redesignated 737th Expeditionary Airlift Squadron. It was activated as a Lockheed C-130 Hercules airlift squadron, made up of multiple detachments from airlift squadrons which constantly rotate. It appeared to be located at Ali Al Salem Air Base in Kuwait as part of the 386th Air Expeditionary Wing.

== Lineage ==
- Constituted as the 737th Bombardment Squadron (Heavy) on 14 May 1943

Activated on 1 June 1943
Redesignated 737th Bombardment Squadron, Heavy c. 1944
Redesignated 737th Bombardment Squadron, Very Heavy on 5 August 1945
Inactivated on 17 October 1945

- Activated in the reserve on 12 July 1947

Inactivated on 27 June 1949

- Redesignated 737th Troop Carrier Squadron, Medium on 26 May 1952

Activated in the reserve on 13 June 1952
Inactivated on 1 January 1953

- Redesignated: 737th Expeditionary Airlift Squadron and converted to provisional status on 12 June 2002

=== Assignments ===
- 454th Bombardment Group, 1 June 1943 - 17 October 1945
- 454th Bombardment Group, 12 July 1947 - 27 June 1949
- 454th Troop Carrier Group, 13 June 1952 - 1 January 1953
- Air Mobility Command to activate or inactivate as needed, 12 June 2002
- Air Combat Command to activate or inactivate as needed, 19 March 2003

386th Expeditionary Operations Group

=== Stations ===
- Alamogordo Army Air Field, New Mexico, 1 June 1943
- Davis-Monthan Field, Arizona, 1 July 1943
- McCook Army Air Field, Nebraska, 31 July 1943
- Charleston Army Air Field, South Carolina, 3 October–December 1943
- Torretto Airfield, Italy 16 January 1944
- San Giovanni Airfield, Italy 24 January 1944 – July 1945
- Sioux Falls Army Air Field, South Dakota, 1 August 1945
- Pyote Army Air Field, Texas, 17 August – 17 October 1945
- McChord Field (later McChord Air Force Base), Washington, 12 July 1947 – 27 June 1949
- Portland International Airport, Oregon, 13 June 1952 – 1 January 1953
- Ali Al Salem Air Base, Kuwait, unknown

=== Aircraft ===
- Consolidated B-24 Liberator, 1943-1945
- Curtiss C-46 Commando, 1952-1953
- Lockheed C-130 Hercules,

=== Awards and campaigns ===
Award streamer	Award	Dates	Notes
	Distinguished Unit Citation	12 April 1944	Bad Vöslau, 737th Bombardment Squadron
	Distinguished Unit Citation	25 July 1944	Linz, 737th Bombardment Squadron
	Air Force Meritorious Unit Award	1 July 2007-30 June 2008	737th Expeditionary Airlift Squadron
	Air Force Meritorious Unit Award	1 June 2010-31 May 2011	737th Expeditionary Airlift Squadron
	Air Force Meritorious Unit Award	1 June 2011-31 May 2012	737th Expeditionary Airlift Squadron
	Air Force Meritorious Unit Award	1 June 2015-31 May 2016	737th Expeditionary Airlift Squadron

Campaign Streamer	Campaign	Dates	Notes
	Air Offensive, Europe	16 January 1944 – 5 June 1944	737th Bombardment Squadron
	Air Combat, EAME Theater	16 January 1944 – 11 May 1945	737th Bombardment Squadron
	Naples-Foggia	16 January 1944 – 21 January 1944	737th Bombardment Squadron
	Rome-Arno	22 January 1944 – 9 September 1944	737th Bombardment Squadron
	Central Europe	22 March 1944 – 21 May 1945	737th Bombardment Squadron
	Normandy	6 June 1944 – 24 July 1944	737th Bombardment Squadron
	Northern France	25 July 1944 – 14 September 1944	737th Bombardment Squadron
	Southern France	15 August 1944 – 14 September 1944	737th Bombardment Squadron
	North Apennines	10 September 1944 – 4 April 1945	737th Bombardment Squadron
	Rhineland	15 September 1944 – 21 March 1945	737th Bombardment Squadron
	Po Valley	3 April 1945 – 8 May 1945	737th Bombardment Squadron
	Transition of Iraq	2 May 2003 -28 June 2004	737th Expeditionary Airlift Squadron
	National Resolution	16 December 2005 – 9 January 2007	737th Expeditionary Airlift Squadron
	Iraqi Surge	10 January 2007 – 31 December 2008	737th Expeditionary Airlift Squadron
	Iraqi Sovereignty	1 January 2009 – 31 August 2010	737th Expeditionary Airlift Squadron
	New Dawn	1 September 2010 – 31 December 2011	737th Expeditionary Airlift Squadron
	Global War on Terror Expeditionary Medal		737th Expeditionary Airlift Squadron

== See also ==
- List of C-130 Hercules operators
- B-24 Liberator units of the United States Army Air Forces
