= 39th Tactical Electronic Warfare Squadron =

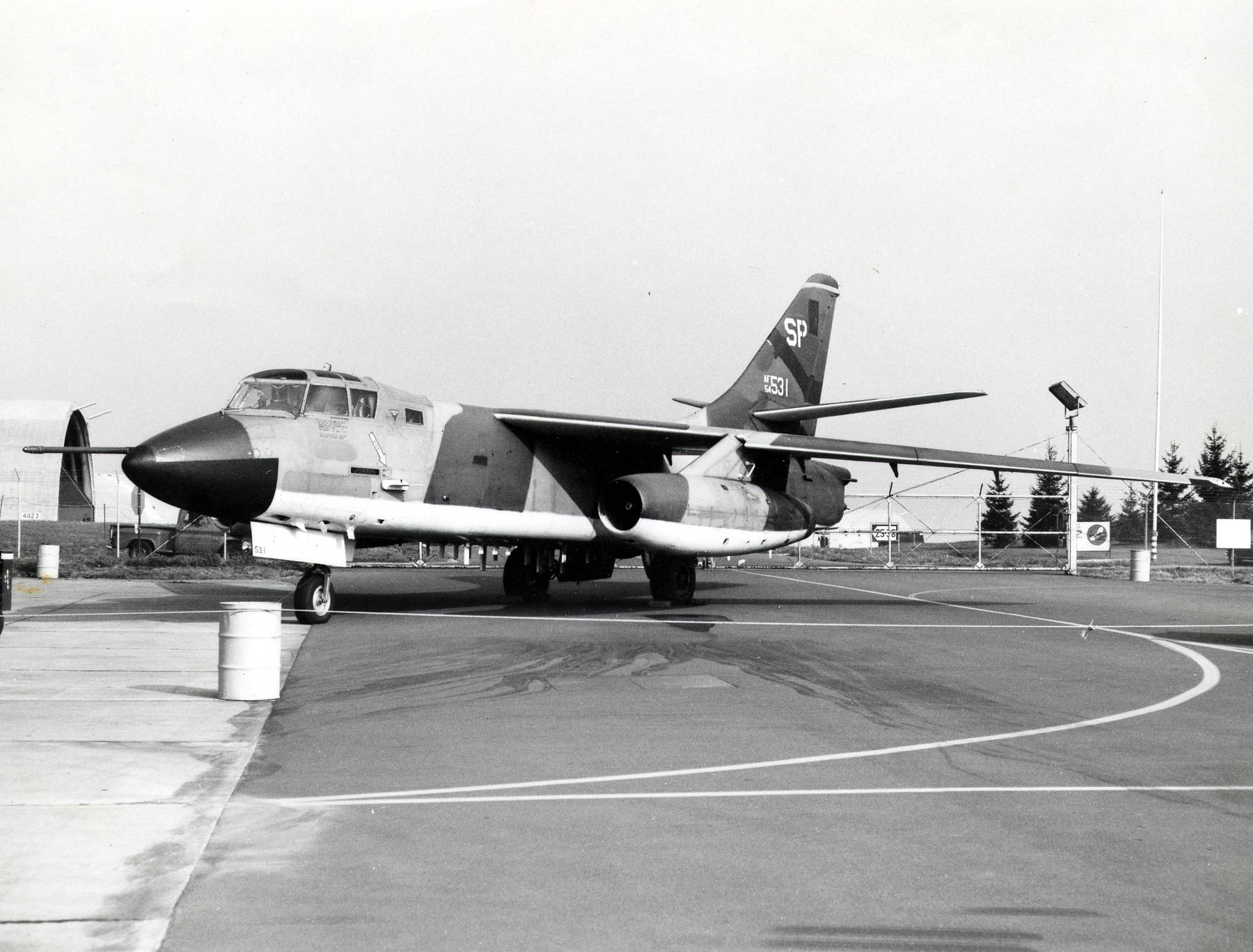
- 39th Tactical Electronic Warfare Squadron EB-66E (Note: Aircraft was originally a Douglas RB-66B-DL, serial 54-0531. It was retired to the Military Aircraft Storage and Disposition Center (MASDC) on 10 March 1965. It was removed from storage and converted to an EB-66E in 1969. It was returned to MASDC on 11 February 1974, declared surplus on 25 April 1974 and scrapped on 8 November 1976. Baugher, Joe (9 May 2023). "1954 USAF Serial Numbers". Joe Baugher. Photo taken at Spangdahlem Air Base, Germany in August 1972.)
- Active: 1943–1945; 1947–1949; 1969–1973.
- Country: United States
- Branch: United States Air Force
- Role: Electronic warfare
- Engagements: Mediterranean Theater of Operations European Theater of Operations
- Decorations: Distinguished Unit Citation

Insignia
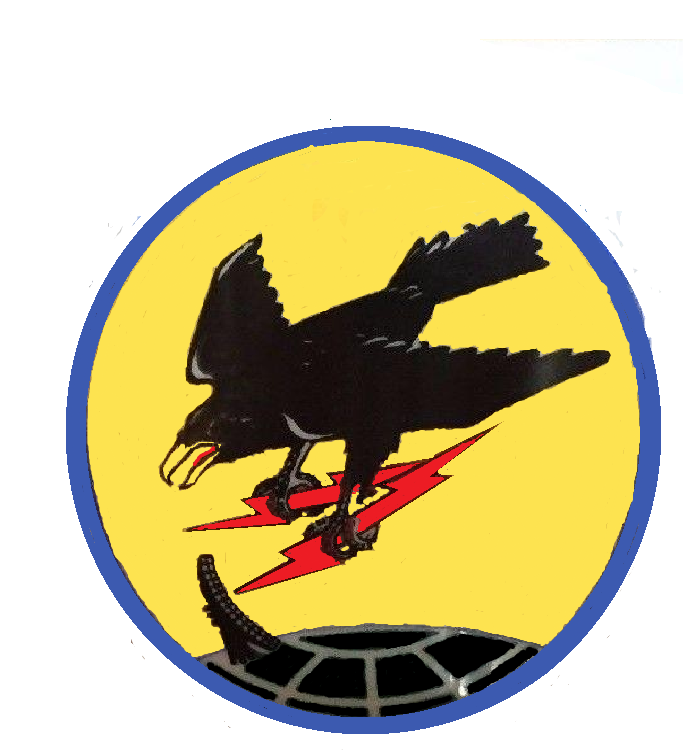
- 39th Tactical Electronic Warfare Squadron emblem
- Tail code 1969–1973: SP
- World War II tail markings after May 1944: Black diamond above, bottom of tail white
- World War II tail markings before May 1944: Black diamond on white circle above, black number 1 in white circle below.

The squadron was the 739th Bombardment Squadron, which was activated in June 1943. After training in the United States with the Consolidated B-24 Liberator, the 739th deployed to the Mediterranean Theater of Operations, participating in the strategic bombing campaign against Germany. It earned two Distinguished Unit Citations for its combat operations. Following V-E Day, the squadron returned to the United States for conversion as a very heavy bomber unit, but was inactivated instead.

The 39th Tactical Electronic Warfare Squadron was activated at Spangdahlem Air Base, Germany in 1969, where it was assigned to the 52d Tactical Fighter Wing until inactivating in January 1973. The two squadrons were consolidated in 1985.

== History ==
=== World War II ===
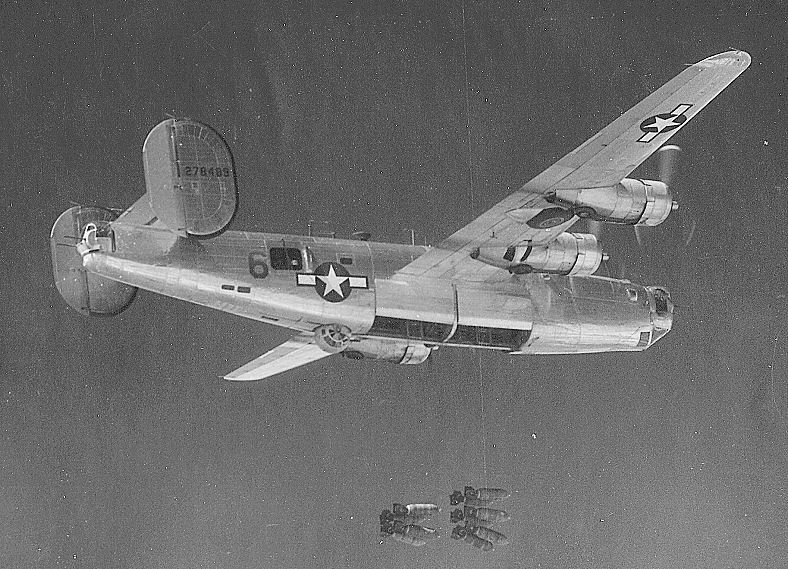
B-24 Liberator of the 454th Bombardment Group (Note: Airplane is North American Aviation built Consolidated B-24J-1-NT, serial 42-78489. This plane ditched on 20 March 1945 Baugher, Joe (10 April 2023). "1942 USAF Serial Numbers". Joe Baugher.)

The squadron was first organized at Alamogordo Army Air Field, New Mexico on 1 June 1943 as one of the four squadrons of the 454th Bombardment Group. It trained with Consolidated B-24 Liberator bombers. After completing training, it left for the Mediterranean Theater of Operations on 8 December 1943.

The squadron arrived in Italy in January 1944, settling in at its combat station, San Giovanni Airfield, by the end of the month. Its primary focus was on long range bombing missions against industrial targets such as enemy oil refineries and munitions and aircraft factories. It struck transportation targets including harbors and airfields in Italy, France, Germany, Austria, Czechoslovakia, Hungary, Yugoslavia, Greece and Rumania The squadron received a Distinguished Unit Citation (DUC) for a raid on an airfield at Bad Vöslau, Austria on 12 April 1944. The squadron earned a second DUC during an attack on a steel plant at Linz, Austria, as the 454th Group led its wing through determined opposition.

The squadron also flew air support and air interdiction missions against marshalling yards, troop concentrations and rail lines for Operation Strangle. The squadron participated in the drive to Rome; Operation Dragoon, the invasion of southern France; and Operation Grapeshot, the Spring 1945 offensive in Northern Italy.

The squadron left Italy in July 1945 and reformed at Sioux Falls Army Air Field, South Dakota the following month. It was redesignated as a very heavy bombardment squadron in anticipation of training and redeployment to the Pacific, but with the Japanese surrender, it was inactivated in October.

=== Air Force Reserve ===
The 739th Bombardment Squadron was reactivated as a reserve unit under Air Defense Command (ADC) at McChord Field, Washington in April 1947 as a Boeing B-29 Superfortress unit, where its training was supervised by the 406th AAF Base Unit (later the 2345th Air Force Reserve Training Center). However, the squadron does not appear to have been fully staffed or equipped with operational aircraft while a reserve unit. In 1948 Continental Air Command assumed responsibility for managing reserve and Air National Guard units from ADC. President Truman's reduced 1949 defense budget required reductions in the number of units in the Air Force. Continental Air Command also reorganized its reserve units under the wing base organization system in June 1949. The squadron was inactivated and its personnel and equipment were transferred to elements of the 302d Troop Carrier Wing, which was activated simultaneously.

=== Cold War ===
The 39th Tactical Electronic Warfare Squadron was activated in April 1969 at Spangdahlem Air Base Germany in an effort to restore an electronic warfare capability to United States Air Forces Europe (USAFE). It was planned to equip the squadron with Douglas EB-66 Destroyers, but all of USAFE's EB-66s had deployed to Southeast Asia to provide jamming support for the Viet Nam War. As a result, the squadron was initially equipped with the less capable Martin EB-57 Canberra. Shortly after activation, it became possible to equip the unit with sixteen EB-66s. The squadron continued its mission at Spangdahlem until ceasing operations in December 1972. It was inactivated in January 1973 as the EB-66 was withdrawn from the Air Force inventory.

The 739th Bombardment Squadron and the 39th Tactical Electronic Warfare Squadron were consolidated into a single unit in September 1985.

== Lineage ==
739th Bombardment Squadron

- Constituted as the 739th Bombardment Squadron (Heavy) on 14 May 1943

Activated on 1 June 1943
Redesignated 739th Bombardment Squadron, Heavy c. 1944
Redesignated 739th Bombardment Squadron, Very Heavy on 5 August 1945
Inactivated on 17 October 1945

- Activated in the reserve on 16 August 1947

Inactivated on 27 June 1949

- Consolidated on 19 September 1985 with the 39th Tactical Electronic Warfare Squadron as the 39th Tactical Electronic Warfare Squadron

39th Tactical Electronic Warfare Squadron

- Constituted as the 39th Tactical Electronic Warfare Squadron on 18 March 1969

Activated on 1 April 1969
Inactivated on 1 January 1973

- Consolidated on 19 September 1985 with the 739th Bombardment Squadron (Note: This unit is not related to the 39th Electronic Warfare Squadron, despite the similar names. That squadron was constituted on 7 July 2020 and activated at Eglin Air Force Base, Florida on 23 July 2020, where it was assigned to the 53d Electronic Warfare Group. It transferred to the 850th Spectrum Warfare Group on 25 June 2021. Lahue, Melissa (19 April 2022). "Factsheet 39 Electronic Warfare Squadron (ACC)". Air Force Historical Research Agency.)

=== Assignments ===
- 454th Bombardment Group, 1 June 1943 – 17 October 1945
- 454th Bombardment Group, 16 August 1947 – 27 June 1949
- 36th Tactical Fighter Wing, 1 April 1969
- 52d Tactical Fighter Wing, 31 December 1971 – 1 January 1973

=== Stations ===
- Alamogordo Army Air Field, New Mexico 1 June 1943
- Davis–Monthan Field, Arizona, 1 July 1943
- McCook Army Air Field, Nebraska, 30 July 1943
- Charleston Army Air Field, South Carolina 3 October 1943 – December 1943
- San Giovanni Airfield, Italy, 21 January 1944 – July 1945
- Sioux Falls Army Air Field, South Dakota, 1 August 1945
- Pyote Army Air Field, Texas 17 August 1945 – 17 October 1945
- McChord Field (later McChord Air Force Base), Washington, 27 April 1947 – 27 June 1949
- Spangdahlem Air Base, Germany, 1 April 1969 – 1 January 1973

=== Aircraft ===
- Consolidated B-24 Liberator, 1943–1945
- Martin EB-57 Canberra, 1969
- Douglas EB-66 Destroyer, 1969–1973

=== Awards and campaigns ===
Award streamer	Award	Dates	Notes
	Distinguished Unit Citation	12 April 1944	739th Bombardment Squadron, Bad Vöslau, Austria
	Distinguished Unit Citation	25 July 1944	739th Bombardment Squadron, Linz, Austria

Campaign Streamer	Campaign	Dates	Notes
	Air Combat, EAME Theater	January 1944-11 May 1945	739th Bombardment Squadron
	Air Offensive, Europe	January 1944-5 June 1944	739th Bombardment Squadron
	Rome-Arno	22 January 1944 – 9 September 1944	739th Bombardment Squadron
	Normandy	6 June 1944 – 24 July 1944	739th Bombardment Squadron
	Northern France	25 July 1944 – 14 September 1944	739th Bombardment Squadron
	Southern France	15 August 1944 – 14 September 1944	739th Bombardment Squadron
	North Apennines	10 September 1944 – 4 April 1945	739th Bombardment Squadron
	Rhineland	15 September 1944 – 21 March 1945	739th Bombardment Squadron
	Central Europe	22 March 1944 – 21 May 1945	739th Bombardment Squadron
	Po Valley	3 April 1945 – 8 May 1945	739th Bombardment Squadron

== See also ==
- List of B-57 units of the United States Air Force
- B-24 Liberator units of the United States Army Air Forces
