= 492nd Attack Squadron =

492d Attack Squadron

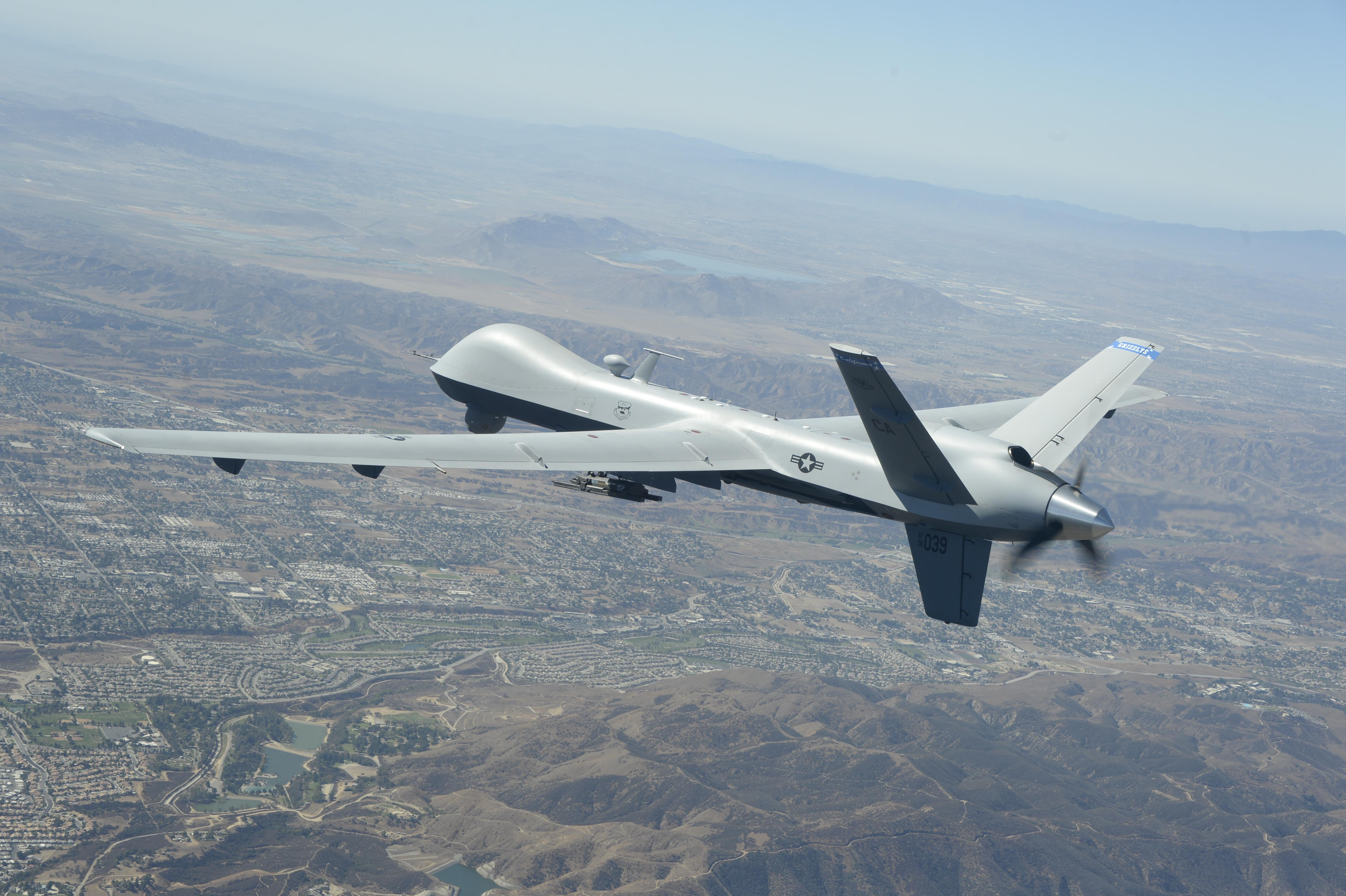
- 163d Attack Wing MQ-9 Reaper
- Active: 1917–1919; 1925–1937; 1942–1946; 1946–1963, 2019-present
- Country: United States
- Branch: United States Air Force
- Role: Unmanned vehicle training
- Part of: Air Education and Training Command
- Nicknames: Busy Beaver Bombing Co. (CBI Theater), Fightin' Bees
- Engagements: World War I Theater of Operations; China-Burma-India Theater
- Decorations: Distinguished Unit Citation; Air Force Outstanding Unit Award

Insignia
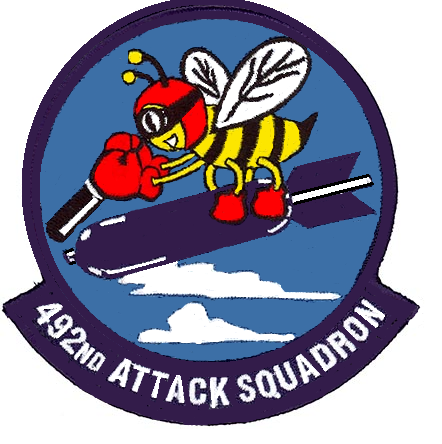
- 492d Attack Squadron emblem (Note: Approved 28 February 1952, Description: On a disc, light blue edged dark blue, above and in front of clouds white in base, a personalized bee, body and wings natural, legs enclosed in boxing gloves red, wearing goggles over a red cap, observing through a telescope black, and standing on a bomb blue, flying through space.)

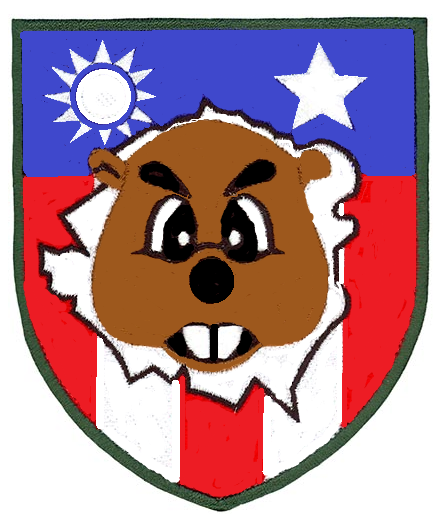
- 492d Bombardment Squadron emblem (World War II)

The 492d Attack Squadron is an active United States Air Force unit. It is stationed at March Air Reserve Base, California, where it was reactivated on 15 April 2019 and assigned to the 49th Operations Group.

The squadron's first predecessor was organized in 1917 as the 80th Aero Squadron. It moved to France the following year, where it was redesignated the 492d Aero Squadron (Construction) and served as a support unit. It returned to the United States, where it was demobilized in 1919.

The second predecessor of the squadron is the 492d Bombardment Squadron, which served in the Organized Reserve from 1925 to 1937. It was consolidated with the Aero Squadron in 1936, but was disbanded along with other reserve units in May 1942, shortly after the United States entered World War II.

The squadron's third predecessor was activated in India in late 1942 as the 492d Bombardment Squadron. It served in combat in the China Burma India Theater, earning a Distinguished Unit Citation. After V-J Day, the squadron returned to the United States and was inactivated at the port of embarkation. A few months later, the squadron was reactivated as a Strategic Air Command bomber unit. It served in the strategic bomber role until being inactivated in 1963, when its resources were transferred to another squadron.

== Mission ==
The squadron trains personnel, including maintenance, base operations support, medical and aircrews with the General Atomics MQ-9 Reaper unmanned vehicle.

== History ==
=== World War I ===
The first predecessor of the squadron was organized as the 80th Aero Squadron at Kelly Field, Texas, on 15 August 1917. Early the next month the unit's mission became apparent when it was redesignated the 80th Aero Squadron (Construction).

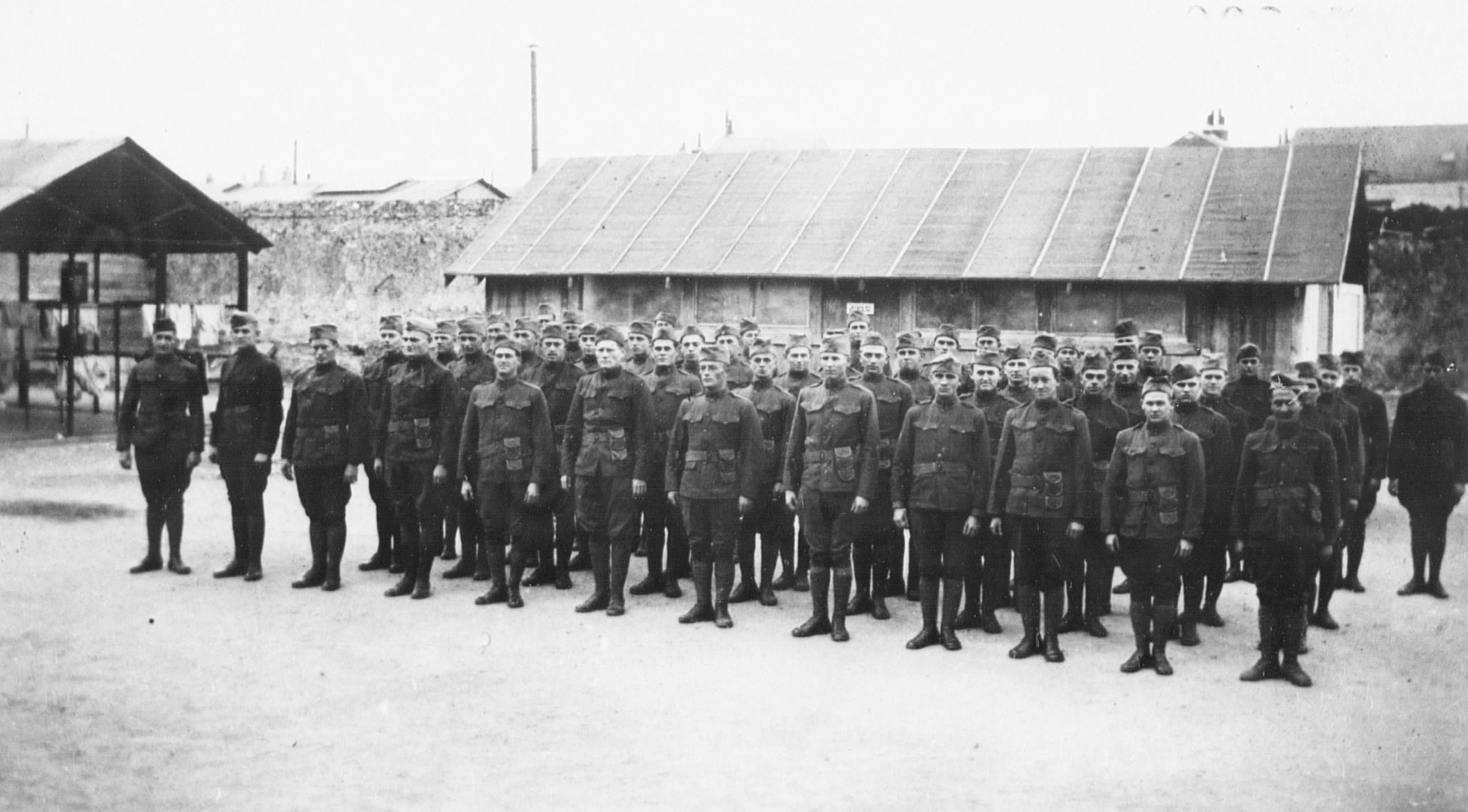
80th Aero Squadron formation, Tours Aerodrome, France, November 1918

The squadron left Kelly Field on 28 October 1917, arriving at the Aviation Concentration Center, Garden City, New York on 3 November. While at Garden City, the squadron was given intensive drill and training for service overseas. It departed for the port of Hoboken, New Jersey on 22 November and boarded the RMS Carpathia. The ship left port later that day, arriving at Halifax, Nova Scotia on 25 November. It waited in Halifax for other ships to form a convoy for the Atlantic crossing, and arrived at Liverpool, England on 8 December. From there, the squadron took a troop train south to a rest camp at Winchester. With the exception of 30 men who were quarantined with sickness, the squadron left Winchester on 13 December and crossed the English Channel on the SS Mona's Queen, landing at Le Havre, France, on 14 December 1917.

After arriving in France the 80th Squadron moved to Tours Aerodrome, where it was assigned to the Second Aviation Instruction Center. On 1 February 1918, the squadron was redesignated the 492d Aero Squadron (Construction). At Tours Aerodrome. it performed construction tasks until the end of World War I. The squadron moved to Brest, France at the end of December 1918 to prepare for shipment home, and returned to the United States aboard the USS Frederick late in January 1919. It was demobilized at Garden City, New York on 13 February. It was reconstituted in December 1936 and consolidated with the first 492d Bombardment Squadron.

=== Interwar years ===
The first 492d Bombardment Squadron was constituted in the Organized Reserve on 31 March 1924, and assigned to the 349th Bombardment Group as part of the General Headquarters Reserve and allotted to the Ninth Corps Area. Training began for reserve personnel in January 1925 at Sand Point Airport, Seattle, Washington. (Note: Clay does not give a specific activation date for the unit. Neither Musser nor Maurer give activation, inactivation or station information for this period.)

The unit was consolidated on 5 December 1936 with the 492d Aero Squadron, in order to perpetuate the history and traditions of the World War I organization. The unit conducted summer training at various locations including Rockwell Field, California, and Pearson Field, Washington. It was inactivated on 2 March 1937 at Seattle by relief of personnel. It was disbanded on 31 May 1942. In 1960, it was reconstituted and consolidated with the second 492d Bombardment Squadron.

=== World War II ===
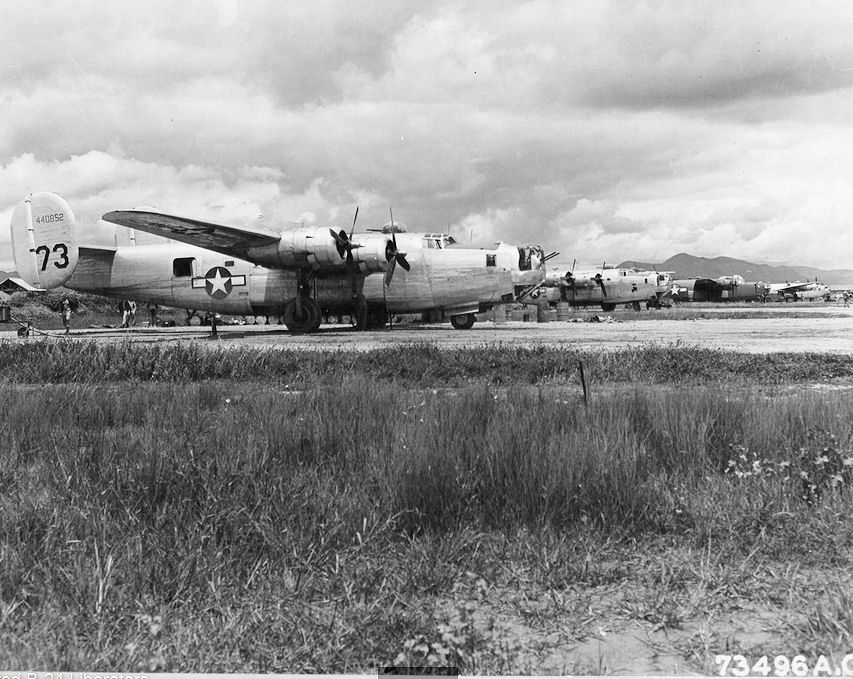
7th Bombardment Group B-24 Liberators, Panagarh Airfield, India, 1943

The 7th Bombardment Group was deploying to the Philippines when the Japanese struck Pearl Harbor. With the air bases in the Philippines in Japanese hands, it engaged in combat in Australia and the Netherlands East Indies. By late spring 1942, it had moved to India. In India, it was assigned two medium bomber squadrons, the 11th and 22d Bombardment Squadrons, and two heavy bomber squadrons, the 9th and 436th Bombardment Squadrons. In September, the two medium squadrons were reassigned to form the cadre for the new 341st Bombardment Group, while the 492d and 493d Bombardment Squadrons were organized to take their places and make the 7th Group an all heavy bomber unit.

The second 492d Bombardment Squadron was activated at Camp Malir near Karachi, India (now Pakistan). It initially was nominally manned, but after moving to Gaya Airfield in November 1942, it received substantial manning by February 1943 and was assigned eight Consolidated B-24 Liberators. The squadron flew its first combat mission on 24 January 1943 when it bombed docks, shipping, and warehouses at Rangoon, Burma. During the next five months the squadron participated in repeated attacks on enemy lines of communication in central and southern Burma, particularly in the area around Rangoon. By the beginning of the monsoon season, the squadron was operating from Panagarh Airfield, India. The monsoon slowed combat operations, although the unit attacked enemy shipping in distant Port Blair in the Andaman Islands and harassed shipping lanes in the Gulf of Martaban between Rangoon and the Andaman Islands. The operational pace picked up with the end of the monsoon, and in November it struck the Insein rail yards, reportedly the only facility in Burma capable of repairing locomotives; and in December flew missions to targets in Bangkok, Thailand.

At the beginning of January 1944, the squadron moved to Madhaiganj Airfield. It concentrated on Japanese Lines of communication in Burma, attacking bridges, docks and warehouses. It focused on the Burmese rail system with attacks on marshalling yards locomotives, and rolling stock. At sea, at attacked merchant vessels and navy ships in the Bay of Bengal. As the 1944 monsoon began, the squadron moved to Tezgaon Airfield, India (now Bangla Desh). There, it ceased combat operations and began ferrying fuel over the Hump to Fourteenth Air Force in China, making its first delivery to Kunming Airfield on 20 June. Supply operations continued until October, when it returned to Madhaiganj. After spending most of the month retraining for combat, it returned to attacking the Burma rail system, although during most of December it focused on enemy bombing storage locations. On 20 December a detachment of the squadron moved to Luliang Airfield, China, where it resumed airlift operations until the end of January.

Early in 1945 the squadron supported British ground forces in the region north of Mandalay and east of the Irrawaddy River. On 19 March it attacked rail lines and bridges in Thailand, for which it was awarded a Distinguished Unit Citation. In 1945, the squadron had adopted the "glip" (for GLide-skIP) bombing technique against bridges, that had been developed by the 490th Bombardment Squadron. After the fall of Rangoon in May 1945 and the onset of the 1945 monsoon, the 492d moved to Tezpur Airfield, India, and once again took on the mission of airlifting gasoline over the Hump into China. This time, its Liberators were modified to act as substitute cargo carriers, and it was 20 June before it resumed operations over the Hump. Hump operations continued past V-J Day, terminating on 18 September. (Note: Byard states that in October the squadron moved to Dudhkundi Airfield, India, and to Kanchrapara on 19 November. Maurer and Musser both say the squadron remained at Tezpur until it left India for the United States.) It sailed from Calcutta aboard the USS General W. M. Black on 7 December 1945 as part of Operation Magic Carpet, and arrived at the Port of Embarkation, Camp Kilmer, New Jersey on 5 January 1946. The unit was inactivated at Camp Kilmer the following day.

=== Strategic Air Command ===
==== B-29 Superfortress operations ====
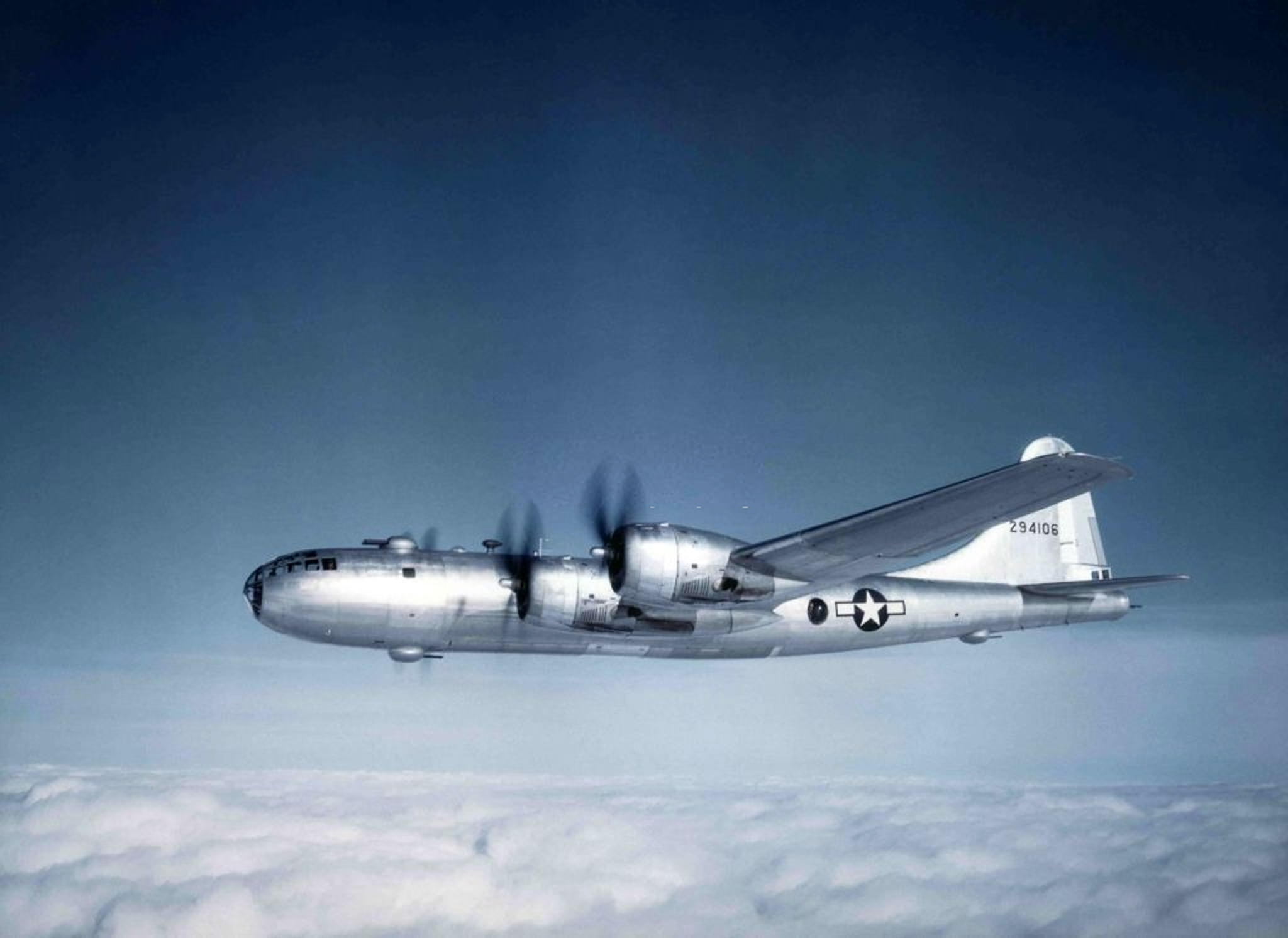
B-29 as flown by the squadron

On 1 October 1946 the 492d was activated at Fort Worth Army Airfield, Texas and assigned to the 7th Bombardment Group of Strategic Air Command (SAC). When the 327th Bombardment Squadron moved on paper from Fort Worth to Smoky Hill Army Airfield, Kansas in the last week of October, the squadron received its first contingent of troops and Boeing B-29 Superfortress aircraft, which had been assigned to the 327th. It then began a training program which was designed primarily to prepare the unit for overseas operations.

In April 1947 the 492d engaged in a mass formation flight from Fort Worth to Los Angeles. During June and July, it deployed to Japan to participate in maneuvers. The following month, most of its planes made a nonstop flight to Elmendorf Field, Alaska, to test the immediate mobility of the 7th Bombardment Group. In September, the 7th Group deployed to Giebelstadt Airfield, Germany. While in Europe they flew training missions in the central and southern parts of the continent.

==== B-36 Peacemaker operations ====
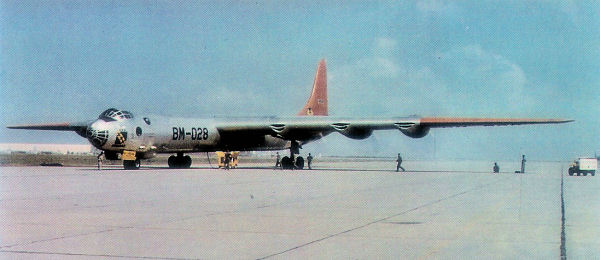
7th Bombardment Group B-36 (Note: Aircraft is Consolidated B-36B-5-CF Peacemaker, serial 44-92038. This plane was later converted to B-36D-10-CF configuration with the addition of four jet engines. It was lost in an explosion at Convair's San Diego Plant. Dirkx, Marco (21 June 2024). "1944 USAF Serial Numbers". Joe Baugher’s Serial Number List..)

In 1948, the squadron began transitioning to the Convair B-36 Peacemaker. it received its first B-36 in June and by January 1949 it completed the transition to the new bomber and ended B-29 operations. In March 1949 an aircrew assigned to the unit flew nonstop a distance of 9,600 miles from Fort Worth to Minneapolis, Great Falls, Montana Key West, Denver, Great Falls, Spokane, Denver, and back to Fort Worth. This 44 hour flight was reported to be the longest to that date in a B-36. The squadron mission was to maintain the ability to conduct strategic strikes, conducting most of its operations from its home base, now named Carswell Air Force Base, primarily operating in the 48 United States. However, it also conducted deployments and exercises outside the United States.

In August 1949 the squadron inaugurated a series of training missions to Alaska. During February 1950 it participated in an operational readiness test in which it deployed several aircraft to Eielson Air Force Base, Alaska. Eielson served as a forward staging area from which simulated missions were directed against targets in the United States. In May 1950 the 492d provided a B-36 for a mobility mission to Ramey Air Force Base, Puerto Rico.

In 1951 and 1954, squadron aircraft and aircrews departed Carswell for Goose Air Base, Labrador, Canada, performing a navigation mission to Thule Air Base, Greenland. On the return flight, they made simulated attacks on targets in the United States. In December 1951 the squadron provided a bomber on a special mission to RAF Sculthorpe, England. On this deployment it participated in a Royal Air Force navigation mission and had a mutual exchange of ideas with Royal Air Force personnel, and compared techniques in target study and briefing.

Starting in August 1954 the squadron began a number of operations in North Africa. That month it flew a simulated strike mission, flying non-stop the 4,600 miles to Nouasseur Air Base, French Morocco, which had been designated its post-strike headquarters. In July 1955, the entire 7th Bombardment Wing deployed to Nouasseur for 60 days. It tested the ability of Nouasseur to act as a prestrike and a post-strike staging area for a B-36 task force. The squadron deployed again to North Africa in February and in October 1956. While deployed, it conducted simulated missions against targets in Europe and the Middle East.

==== B-52 Stratofortress operations ====
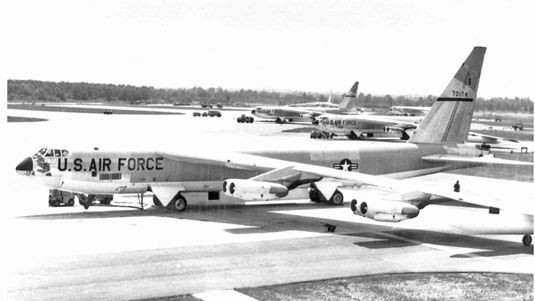
Squadron B-52 Stratofortresses at Columbus AFB (Note: The aircraft in the foreground is Boeing B-52F-70-BW Stratofortress, serial 57-174 in 1962.)

In December 1957, the 7th Bombardment Wing began conversion from the B-36 to the Boeing B-52F Stratofortress. In March 1958, crews began transition training at Castle Air Force Base, California. The first B-52s arrived in June, and the wing was combat ready by January 1959. However, large concentrations of bombers, like the 45 B-52s of the 7th Wing at Carswell, made attractive targets for an enemy strike. SAC decided to disperse its B-52 force to smaller wings with 15 bombers at other bases. This not only complicated Soviet targeting planning, but with more runways, it would take less time to launch the bomber force.

Implementing this program, on 15 June 1959, the 492d moved to Columbus Air Force Base, Mississippi, where it was assigned to the 4228th Strategic Wing. It conducted worldwide strategic bombardment training missions and provided nuclear deterrent. The squadron began to keep aircraft on alert in keeping with General Thomas S. Power’s initial goal of maintaining one third of SAC's planes on fifteen minute ground alert, fully fueled and ready for combat to reduce vulnerability to a Soviet missile strike. That goal was met by 1960, but the alert commitment was increased to half the squadron's aircraft in 1962. SAC planners were also looking into other methods to protect their forces in addition to the ground alert program as early as 1957 In January 1961, SAC disclosed it was maintaining an airborne force (which included the squadron's Stratofortresses) for "airborne alert training" in Operation Chrome Dome.

At the beginning of the Cuban Missile Crisis, on 20 October, the squadron, along with all B-52 units except those equipped with the B-52H, were directed to put two additional planes on alert. On 22 October, 1/8 of SAC's B-52s were placed on airborne alert. On 24 October SAC went to DEFCON 2, placing all the squadron's aircraft on alert As tensions eased, on 21 November SAC returned to its normal airborne alert posture. On 27 November, SAC finally returned to normal ground alert posture.

The 4228th Wing was a Major Command controlled (MAJCON) wing, and MAJCON units could not carry a permanent history or lineage. SAC received authority from Headquarters USAF to discontinue its MAJCON strategic wings that were equipped with combat aircraft and to activate Air Force controlled (AFCON) units, most of which were inactive at the time, but which could carry a lineage and history. SAC activated the 454th Bombardment Wing at Columbus to replace the 4228th on 1 February 1963. In this reorganization, the 492d was inactivated and transferred its mission, personnel, and equipment to the 454th's 736th Bombardment Squadron, which was simultaneously activated.

=== Unmanned vehicle training ===
The squadron was redesignated the 492d Attack Squadron and activated at March Air Reserve Base, California to train operators of unmanned aerial vehicles. It was assigned to the 49th Operations Group, which is stationed at Holloman Air Force Base, New Mexico The squadron is associated with the 163rd Attack Wing in training personnel, including maintenance, base operations support, medical and aircrews with the General Atomics MQ-9 Reaper. The activation of the squadron enables the 163rd Wing to graduate 72 or more MQ-9 crews per year.

In April 2025 the 163d Wing hosted Exercise Reaper Smoke 2025. This exercise was the first Air Force operation focusing on maritime operations with the MQ-9, emphasizing the long range needed for operations in the Indo-Pacific theater.

== Lineage ==
492d Aero Squadron

- Organized as the 80th Aero Squadron on 15 August 1917

Redesignated 80th Aero Squadron (Construction) in September 1917
Redesignated 492d Aero Squadron (Construction) on 1 February 1918
Demobilized on 13 February 1919
Reconstituted and consolidated with the 492d Bombardment Squadron on 5 December 1936

492d Bombardment Squadron

- Constituted as the 492d Bombardment Squadron and allotted to the Organized Reserve on 31 March 1924

"Initiated" in January 1925
Consolidated with the 492d Aero Squadron on 5 December 1936
Inactivated on 2 March 1937
Disbanded on 31 May 1942
Consolidated with the 492d Bombardment Squadron, Heavy on 31 March 1960

492d Attack Squadron

- Constituted as the 492d Bombardment Squadron (Heavy) on 19 September 1942

Activated on 25 October 1942
Redesignated 492d Bombardment Squadron, Heavy c. 19 September 1944
Inactivated on 6 January 1946

- Redesignated 492d Bombardment Squadron, Very Heavy and activated on 1 October 1946

Redesignated 492d Bombardment Squadron, Heavy on 20 July 1948
Consolidated with the 492d Bombardment Squadron on 31 March 1960
Discontinued and inactivated on 1 February 1963

- Redesignated 492d Attack Squadron on 26 Mar 2019

Activated on 15 Apr 2019

=== Assignments ===
- Unknown, 15 August 1917 (Note: Probably Post Headquarters, Kelly Field, Texas until 28 October 1917, then Garden City Aviation General Supply Depot & Concentration Camp, 3–22 November 1917.)
- Second Aviation Instruction Center, 15 January 1918 – 9 December 1918 (Note: Musser indicates that the squadron was assigned to the Air Service, Services of Supply and only a detachment of the squadron was assigned to the center, with a start date of 25 April 1918. Musser, Factsheet 492 Attack Squadron.)
- Air Service, Services of Supply, 9 December 1918 – 13 February 1919
- 349th Bombardment Group, 1925 – 2 Mar 1937
- 7th Bombardment Group, 25 October 1942 – 6 January 1946; 1 October 1946
- 7th Bombardment Wing, 16 June 1952
- 4228th Strategic Wing, 15 June 1959 – 1 February 1963
- 49th Operations Group, 15 April 2019 – present

=== Stations ===
- Kelly Field, Texas, 15 August 1917
- Aviation Concentration Center, Garden City, New York, 3–22 November 1917
- Tours Aerodrome, France, 15 January 1918
- Brest, France, 30 December 1918-c. 19 January 1919
- Sand Point Airport, Washington, January 1925 – 2 March 1937
- Garden City, New York, c. 31 January–13 February 1919
- Camp Malir, India, 25 October 1942
- Gaya Airfield, India, 14 November 1942
- Piardoba Airfield, Bishnupur, India, 26 February 1943
- Panagarh Airfield, India, 25 April 1943
- Madhaiganj Airfield, India, 22 January 1944
- Tezgaon Airdrome, India, 17 June 1944
- Madhaiganj Airfield, India, 6 October 1944 (detachment at Liulang Airfield, China, 20 December 1944 – 30 January 1945)
- Tezpur Airfield, India, 1 June–7 December 1945
- Camp Kilmer, New Jersey, 5–6 January 1946
- Fort Worth Army Airfield (later Griffiss Air Force Base, Carswell Air Force Base), Texas, 1 October 1946
- Columbus Air Force Base, Mississippi, 15 June 1959 – 1 February 1963
- March Air Reserve Base, California, 15 April 2019 – present

=== Aircraft ===
- Consolidated B-24 Liberator, 1942–1945
- Boeing B-29 Superfortress, 1946–1948
- Convair B-36 Peacemaker, 1948–1958
- Boeing B-52F Stratofortress, 1958-1963
- General Atomics MQ-9 Reaper, 2019–present

=== Awards and campaigns ===
Award streamer	Award	Dates	Notes
	Distinguished Unit Citation	19 March 1945	Thailand, 492d Bombardment Squadron
	Air Force Outstanding Unit Award	6 October 1959–15 July 1960	492d Bombardment Squadron
	Air Force Outstanding Unit Award	1 July 2020–30 June 2022	492d Attack Squadron

Campaign Streamer	Campaign	Dates	Notes
	Theater of Operations	15 January 1918–c. 19 January 1919	80th Aero Squadron (later 492d Aero Squadron)
	China Defensive	25 October 1942–4 May 1945	492d Bombardment Squadron
	India-Burma	2 April 1943–28 January 1945	492d Bombardment Squadron
	Central Burma	29 January 1945–15 July 1945	492d Bombardment Squadron
	China Offensive	5 May 1945–2 September 1945	492d Bombardment Squadron

== See also ==
- List of B-52 Units of the United States Air Force
- List of B-29 Superfortress operators
- B-24 Liberator units of the United States Army Air Forces
- List of American Aero Squadrons
