= 736th Bombardment Squadron =

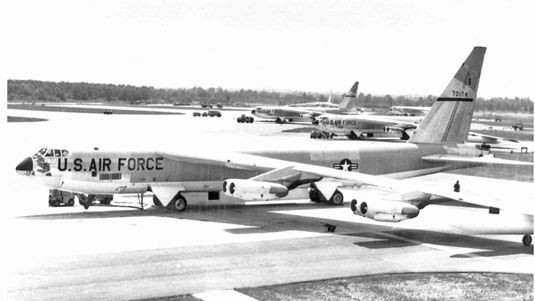
- 736th Squadron B-52F Stratofortresses on alert at Columbus AFB (Note: Aircraft in foreground is Boeing B-52F-70-BW Stratofortress, serial 57-0174. This aircraft was sent to the Military Aircraft Storage and Disposal Center on 30 August 1971 and scrapped in May 1992. Baugher, Joe (29 April 2023). "1957 USAF Serial Numbers". Joe Baugher.)
- Active: 1943–1945; 1947–1951; 1952–1953; 1963–1969
- Country: United States
- Branch: United States Air Force
- Role: Heavy bomber
- Nickname: The Professionals (1966-1969)
- Motto: Ever Alert (1963-1969)
- Engagements: Mediterranean Theater of Operations
- Decorations: Distinguished Unit Citation; Air Force Outstanding Unit Award

Insignia
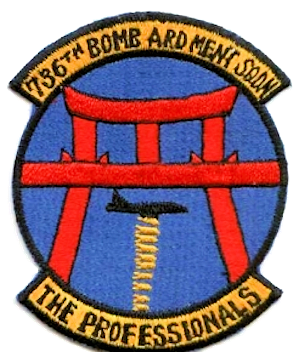
- Patch with 736th Bombardment Squadron emblem (Note: Used in Southeast Asia.)

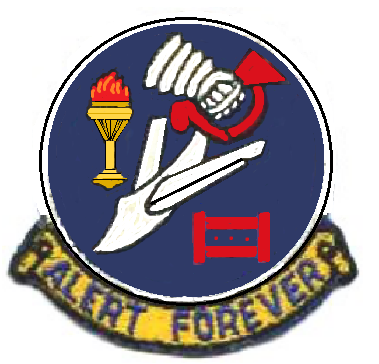
- 736th Bombardment Squadron emblem

The 736th Bombardment Squadron is an inactive United States Air Force unit. It was last assigned to the 454th Bombardment Wing at Columbus Air Force Base, Mississippi, where it was inactivated on 2 July 1969 as the United States reduced its inventory of older Boeing B-52 Stratofortresses..

The squadron was first activated in June 1943. After training in the United States with the Consolidated B-24 Liberator, the squadron deployed to the Mediterranean Theater of Operations, participating in the strategic bombing campaign against Germany. It earned two Distinguished Unit Citations for its combat operations. Following V-E Day, the squadron returned to the United States for conversion as a very heavy bomber unit, but was inactivated instead.

The squadron was activated in the reserves in 1947, but does not appear to have been fully staffed or equipped. In 1949, it moved to Fairchild Air Force Base, Washington, where it became a corollary of the active duty unit there. It was mobilized for the Korean War in May 1951, but its personnel were used as fillers for other units and it was inactivated. It was redesignated the 736th Troop Carrier Squadron and again activated in the reserve in 1952, but was inactivated the following year and its personnel and equipment transferred to another unit.

In 1963, the squadron returned to the heavy bomber mission and was activated at Columbus as part of a Strategic Air Command program to continue the histories of World War II combat units.

== History ==
=== World War II ===
The squadron was first organized at Alamogordo Army Air Field, New Mexico on 1 June 1943 as one of the four squadrons of the 454th Bombardment Group. It trained with Consolidated B-24 Liberator bombers. After completing training, it left for the Mediterranean Theater of Operations on 8 December 1943.

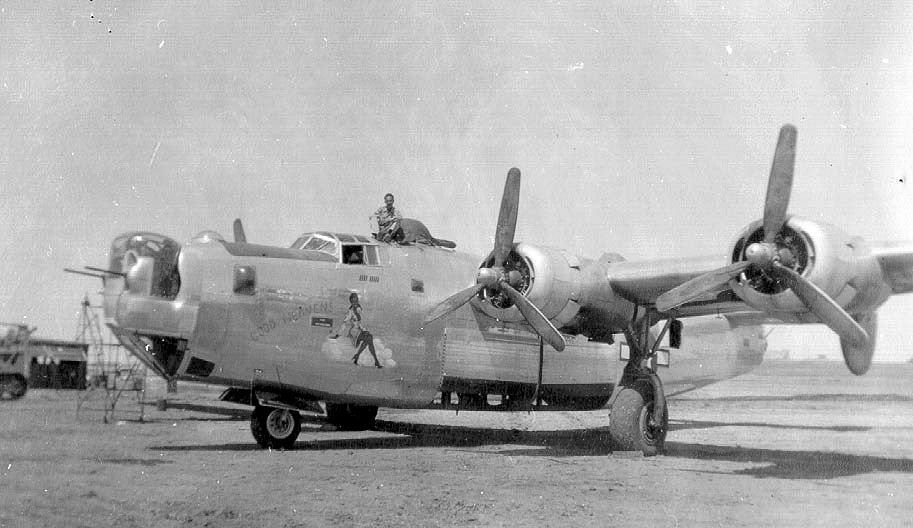
736th Squadron B-24L Liberator (Note: Aircraft is Consolidated B-24L-5-CO Liberator, serial 44-41459, Good Heavens!.)

The squadron arrived in Italy in January 1944, settling in at its combat station, San Giovanni Airfield, by the end of the month. Its primary focus was on long range bombing missions against industrial targets such as enemy oil refineries and munitions and aircraft factories. It struck transportation targets including harbors and airfields in Italy, France, Germany, Austria, Czechoslovakia, Hungary, Yugoslavia, Greece and Romania. The squadron received a Distinguished Unit Citation (DUC) for a raid on an airfield at Bad Vöslau, Austria on 12 April 1944. The squadron earned a second DUC during an attack on a steel plant at Linz, Austria, as the 454th Group led its wing through determined opposition.

The squadron also flew air support and air interdiction missions against marshalling yards, troop concentrations and rail lines for Operation Strangle, the effort to cut German supply lines in Italy north of Rome between March and May 1944. The squadron participated in the drive to Rome; Operation Dragoon, the invasion of southern France; and Operation Grapeshot, the Spring 1945 offensive in Northern Italy.

The squadron left Italy in July 1945 and reformed at Sioux Falls Army Air Field, South Dakota the following month. It was redesignated as a very heavy bombardment squadron in anticipation of training and redeployment to the Pacific, but with the Japanese surrender, it was inactivated in October.

=== Air Force reserve ===
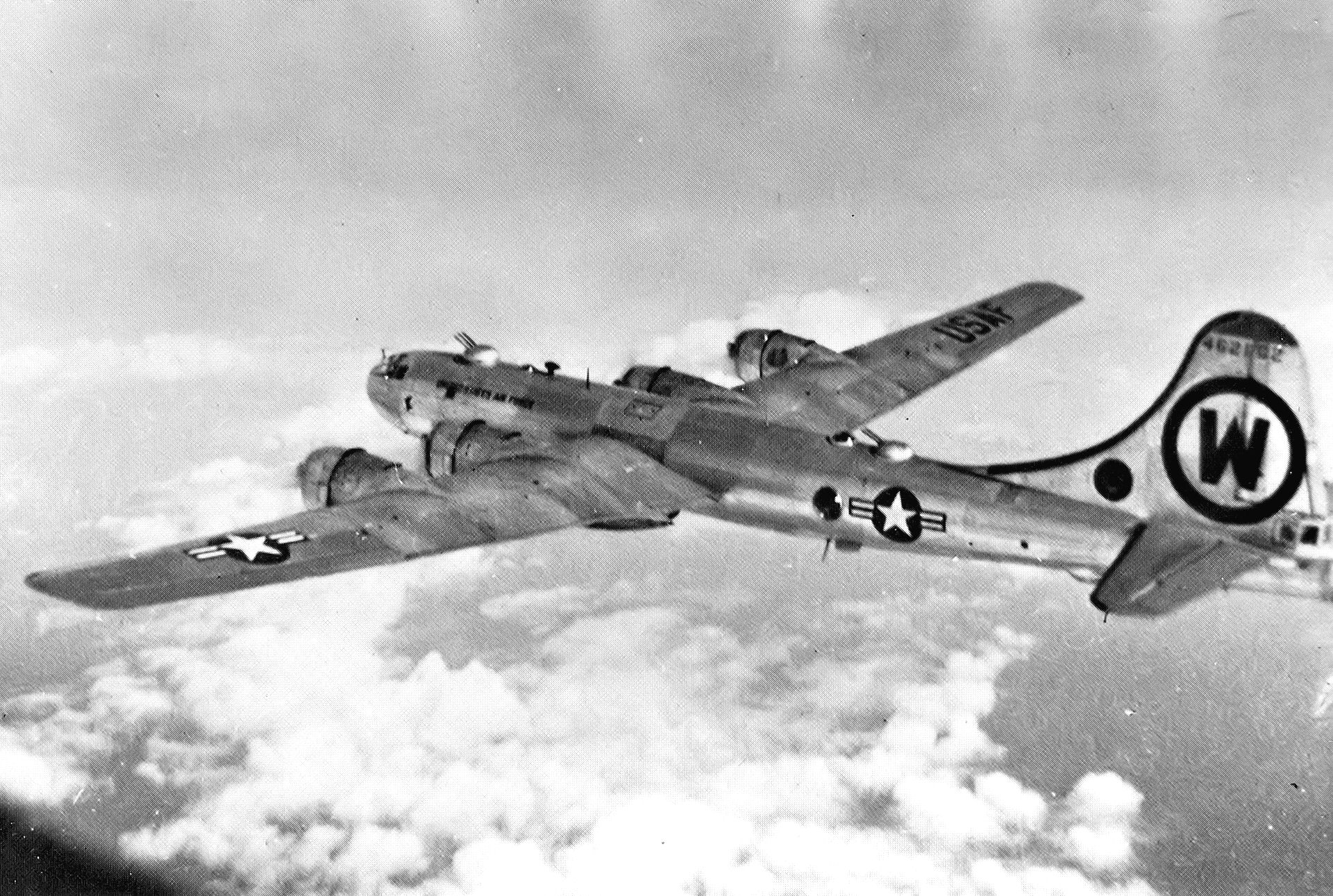
92d Bombardment Wing B-29A Superfortress (Note: Aircraft is Boeing B-29A-60-BN Superfortress, serial 44-62102, Wright's Delight. This plane crashed in North Korea on 19 November 1952. Baugher, Joe (10 May 2023). "1944 USAF Serial Numbers". Joe Baugher.)

The squadron was reactivated in April 1947 at McChord Field, Washington as a reserve unit. It trained under the supervision of Air Defense Command's 406th AAF Base Unit (later 2345th Air Force Reserve Training Center). The squadron was nominally a heavy bomber unit, but it is not clear whether it had any combat aircraft assigned. In 1948 Continental Air Command (ConAC) assumed responsibility for managing reserve and Air National Guard units from ADC.

The May 1949 Air Force Reserve program called for a new type of unit, the Corollary unit, which was a reserve unit integrated with an active duty unit. The plan was viewed as the best method to train reservists by mixing them with an existing regular unit to perform duties alongside the regular unit. The squadron moved to Spokane Air Force Base, Washington, where it operated the Boeing B-29 Superfortresses of the regular 92d Bombardment Wing located there. All reserve corollary units were mobilized for the Korean War. As the 92d Wing was beginning to convert to the Convair B-36 Peacemaker, the squadron was called to active duty, its personnel were used as fillers for other organizations, and it was inactivated on 16 June 1951.

The reserve mobilization for the Korean War had left the reserve without aircraft, and the reserves did not receive aircraft again until July 1952. In preparing for the receipt of aircraft, in June 1952, ConAC activated the 454th Troop Carrier Wing at Portland International Airport, Oregon to replace the 922d Reserve Training Wing, the non-flying headquarters for reserve units there. The squadron was redesignated the 736th Troop Carrier Squadron and activated with the 454th Wing. It began training with Curtiss C-46 Commando transports. However, on 1 January 1953, the 403d Troop Carrier Wing, a reserve unit that had served with Far East Air Forces in Japan and Korea, was relieved from active duty and replaced the 454th Wing at Portland. As a result, the 736th inactivated and transferred it personnel and equipment to the 63d Troop Carrier Squadron, which was activated in its place.

=== Strategic Air Command ===
In February 1963, Strategic Air Command (SAC) organized the 454th Bombardment Wing at Columbus Air Force Base, Mississippi, where it assumed the aircraft, personnel and equipment of the discontinued 4228th Strategic Wing. The 4228th was a Major Command controlled (MAJCON) wing, which could not carry a permanent history or lineage, and SAC wanted to replace it with a permanent unit. As part of this reorganization, the 736th was again designated the 736th Bombardment Squadron, was organized, and assumed the mission, personnel and equipment of the 492d Bombardment Squadron, which was simultaneously inactivated.

One half of the squadron's Boeing B-52F Stratofortresses were maintained on fifteen minute alert, fully fueled and ready for combat to reduce vulnerability to a Soviet missile strike. In addition, the squadron trained for strategic bombardment missions. The squadron was one of the first to deploy its planes and aircrews to support Operation Arc Light, SAC operations in Southeast Asia, starting its first deployment on 16 November 1965. This deployment lasted until 31 March 1966, and the squadron again deployed its personnel and planes to Anderson Air Force Base, Guam from 27 June to about 23 December 1967 and between 28 June and 28 December 1968.

However, shortly after the squadron's first deployment to support Arc Light, Robert S. McNamara, Secretary of Defense approved a phaseout program that would reduce SAC's bomber force. The program called for the mid-1971 retirement of B-52Cs, and of several subsequent B-52 models. Only a few months after its return from its third deployment, in May 1969, the 454th Wing began focusing on phasing down its operations and transferring Columbus to Air Training Command. The squadron was inactivated on 2 July 1969 with the end of SAC operations at Columbus.

== Lineage ==
- Constituted as the 736th Bombardment Squadron (Heavy) on 14 May 1943

Activated on 1 June 1943
Redesignated 736th Bombardment Squadron, Heavy c. 1944
Redesignated 736th Bombardment Squadron, Very Heavy on 5 August 1945
Inactivated on 17 October 1945

- Activated in the reserve on 27 April 1947

Redesignated 736th Bombardment Squadron, Medium on 27 June 1949
Ordered to active service on 1 May 1951
Inactivated on 16 June 1951

- Redesignated 736th Troop Carrier Squadron, Medium on 26 May 1952

Activated in the reserve on 13 June 1952
Inactivated on 1 January 1953

- Redesignated 736th Bombardment Squadron, Heavy and activated, on 15 Nov 1962 (not organized)

Organized on 1 February 1963
Inactivated on 2 July 1969

=== Assignments ===
- 454th Bombardment Group, 1 June 1943 – 17 October 1945
- 454th Bombardment Group, 27 April 1947 – 16 Jun 1951
- 454th Troop Carrier Group, 13 June 1952 – 1 January 1953
- Strategic Air Command, 15 November 1962 (not organized)
- 454th Bombardment Wing, 1 February 1963 – 2 July 1969

=== Stations ===
- Alamogordo Army Air Field, New Mexico, 1 June 1943
- Davis-Monthan Field, Arizona, 1 July 1943
- McCook Army Air Field, Nebraska, 30 July 1943
- Charleston Army Air Field, South Carolina, 3 October–8 December 1943
- Torretto Airfield, Italy, 16 January 1944
- San Giovanni Airfield, Italy, 24 January 1944 – July 1945
- Sioux Falls Army Air Field, South Dakota, 1 August 1945
- Pyote Army Air Field, Texas, 17 August–17 October 1945
- McChord Field (later McChord Air Force Base), Washington, 27 April 1947
- Spokane Air Force Base (later Fairchild Air Force Base), Washington, 27 June 1949 – 16 June 1951
- Portland International Airport, Oregon, 13 June 1952 – 1 January 1953
- Columbus Air Force Base, Mississippi, 1 February 1963 – 2 July 1969

=== Aircraft ===
- Consolidated B-24 Liberator, 1943-1945
- Boeing B-29 Superfortress, 1949-1951
- Curtiss C-46 Commando, 1952-1953
- Boeing B-52 Stratofortress, 1963-1968

=== Awards and campaigns ===
Award streamer	Award	Dates	Notes
	Distinguished Unit Citation	12 April 1944	Bad Vöslau, 736th Bombardment Squadron
	Distinguished Unit Citation	25 July 1944	Linz, 736th Bombardment Squadron
	Air Force Outstanding Unit Award	1 December 1965-1 March 1966	736th Bombardment Squadron
	Air Force Outstanding Unit Award	2 March 1966-1 April 1966, 31 July 1967-31 December 1967	736th Bombardment Squadron
	Air Force Outstanding Unit Award	1 July 1968-1 December 1968	736th Bombardment Squadron

Campaign Streamer	Campaign	Dates	Notes
	Air Offensive, Europe	16 January 1944 – 5 June 1944	736th Bombardment Squadron
	Air Combat, EAME Theater	16 January 1944 – 11 May 1945	736th Bombardment Squadron
	Naples-Foggia	16 January 1944 – 21 January 1944	736th Bombardment Squadron
	Rome-Arno	22 January 1944 – 9 September 1944	736th Bombardment Squadron
	Central Europe	22 March 1944 – 21 May 1945	736th Bombardment Squadron
	Normandy	6 June 1944 – 24 July 1944	736th Bombardment Squadron
	Northern France	25 July 1944 – 14 September 1944	736th Bombardment Squadron
	Southern France	15 August 1944 – 14 September 1944	736th Bombardment Squadron
	North Apennines	10 September 1944 – 4 April 1945	736th Bombardment Squadron
	Rhineland	15 September 1944 – 21 March 1945	736th Bombardment Squadron
	Po Valley	3 April 1945 – 8 May 1945	736th Bombardment Squadron

== See also ==
- List of B-52 Units of the United States Air Force
- B-24 Liberator units of the United States Army Air Forces
