= 454th Bombardment Group =

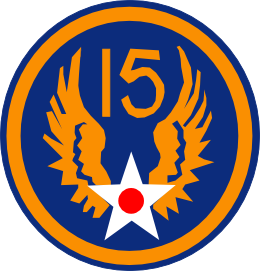
454th Bombardment Group

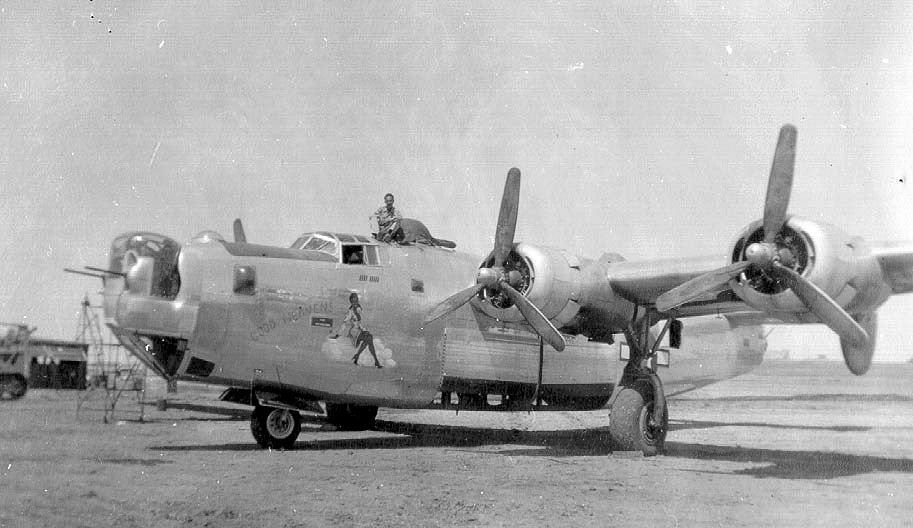
- Consolidated B-24J Liberator of the 736th Bombardment Squadron. This aircraft survived the war and was scrapped on 22 November 1946
- Active: 1943–1945, 1951–1952
- Country: United States
- Branch: United States Army Air Forces
- Role: Bombardment
- Part of: Fifteenth Air Force
- Engagements: Mediterranean Theater of Operations
- Decorations: Distinguished Unit Citation; Air Force Outstanding Unit Award

Insignia
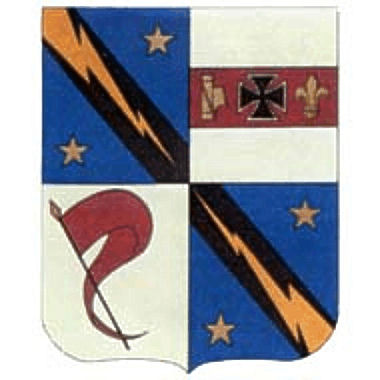
- 454th Bombardment Group Emblem
- Tail Marking: Black Diamond (Note: Black outline diamond on a white circle on camouflaged aircraft, Black diamond on unpainted aircraft.)

The 454th Bombardment Group is an inactive United States Air Force unit. It was last assigned to the 454th Troop Carrier Wing of Continental Air Command at Portland International Airport, Oregon. It was inactivated on 1 January 1953.

The 454th Bombardment Group was activated in 1943 as a United States Army Air Forces combat unit. It served primarily in the Mediterranean Theater during World War II. While in combat the group earned two Distinguished Unit Citations. The group served as a bombardment and as a troop carrier unit in the reserves after World War II.

In 1947 the group was activated as a reserve unit. It continued in this role until 1951 when it was called to active duty and its personnel used to fill out active duty organizations deploying to the Pacific.

The group was reestablished later during the Korean War as the 454th Troop Carrier Group, a reserve organization at Portland International Airport, Oregon. It was discontinued six months later, when the 403d Troop Carrier Group was released from active duty and assumed its mission, personnel and equipment. In 1985 the wing returned to its designation as a bombardment group while remaining inactive.

== History ==
=== World War II ===
The group was constituted as 454th Bombardment Group (Heavy) on 14 May 1943 and activated on 1 June at Davis–Monthan Field, near Tucson, Arizona. Training began immediately on Consolidated B-24 Liberators and the ground cadre was sent on 3 July to Army Air Force School of Applied Tactics at Orlando AAB, Florida. On 15 July, planes were sent from Davis–Monthan to join them at Pinecastle AAF, Florida for practical field training.

From their bases in Florida, the ground echelon was transferred on 28 July 1943 to McCook AAF, Nebraska and, on 1 August, the air echelon joined them. This was the first operational unit to use the newly constructed McCook airfield. On 28 September the Group was reassigned to Charleston AAB, South Carolina

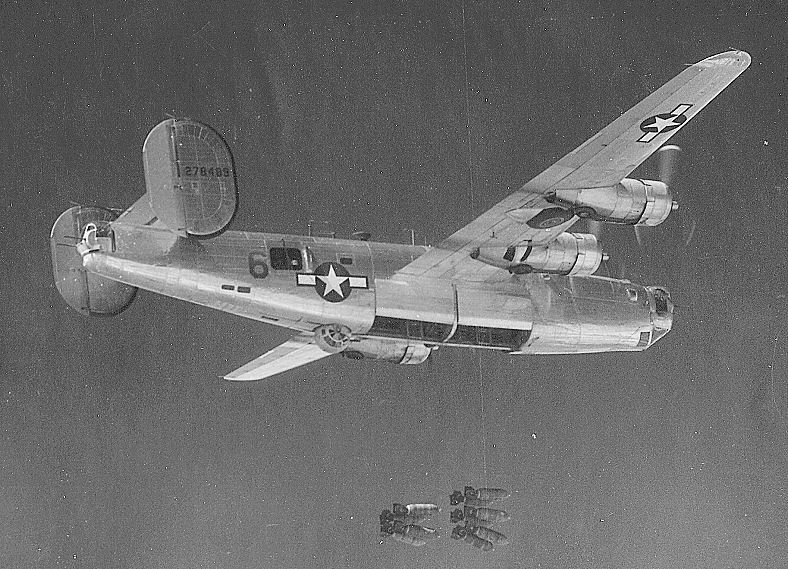
North American B-24J Liberator 42–78489 over a target. This aircraft was later lost on 20 March 1945

On 2 December 1943 the aircrews and some key ground personnel were sent to Mitchel Field, New York in preparation for deployment overseas. These personnel were subsequently transferred to Morrison Field, Florida and flew the southern route to North Africa. After additional training in Tunisia, the air echelon joined the ground echelon, which had previously departed from Camp Patrick Henry by Liberty Ship, at San Giovanni Airfield, west of Cerignola, Italy, and was assigned to Fifteenth Air Force. Although the group flew some interdiction and support missions, it engaged primarily in long range strikes against oil refineries. aircraft and munitions factories and industrial areas, harbors, and airfields.

Flying from Italy, the group flew 243 missions on over 150 primary targets in Italy, Yugoslavia, Austria, Bulgaria, Hungary, Rumania, France, Germany, Czechoslovakia, Greece, and Poland. During this time, 13,389.19 tons of bombs were dropped during 7,091 sorties on enemy marshalling yards, oil refineries, bridges, installations, airdromes, rail lines, etc.

The 454th participated in the drive to Rome, the invasion of Southern France, and the defeat of Axis forces in northern Italy. The 454th was awarded a Distinguished Unit Citation (DUC) for similar action on the high priority Messerschmitt Aircraft Factory at Bad Vöslau, Austria on 12 April 1944. It earned a second DUC for "outstanding performance of duty in armed conflict with the enemy" as a result of their mission against the Hermann Goering Steel Works in Linz, Austria on 25 July 1944.

After the German Capitulation in May 1945, the 454th redeployed to the United States on 8 July. Many personnel were demobilized upon arrival at the port of debarkation; a small cadre of key personnel was formed, and the group was then established at Sioux Falls Army Air Field South Dakota in July, and the unit was redesignated the 454th Bombardment Group, Very Heavy in July, and was equipped with B-29 Superfortresses, and programmed for deployment to the Pacific Theater.

The Japanese Capitulation in August made the group redundant to Air Force requirements and the unit was inactivated on 17 October 1945.

=== Korean War ===
The group was allotted to the Air Force Reserve in April 1947, stationed at McChord Field, Washington, and equipped with B-29s removed from storage in the southwest. The group moved in July 1949 to Spokane AFB, Washington, where it served as a corollary unit for the 98th Bombardment Group, retaining only a single squadron.

As a result of the Korean War, the 454th was activated on 1 May 1951. Upon activation, the group's personnel and equipment were reassigned as replacements to the 98th Bombardment Wing, which deployed to Far East Air Forces at Yokota AB, Japan. The group was inactivated as a paper unit on 16 June.

- For related subsequent history, see 454th Bombardment Wing.

Continental Air Command established the 454th Troop Carrier Wing at Portland International Airport, Oregon in June 1952 to replace the 922d Reserve Training Wing, which had taken over reserve activities at Portland following the mobilization of the 403d Troop Carrier Wing. Under the wing base organization (Hobson Plan), the group was redesignated the 454th Troop Carrier Group and assigned to the wing as its operational element. It was equipped with Curtiss C-46 Commandos. Its activation as a reserve transport unit was short, as it was inactivated and its mission, personnel and equipment transferred to the 403d Troop Carrier Wing when the 403d was released from active duty in January 1953.

In 1985, the United States Air Force returned the group to its original bombardment designation.

== Lineage ==
454th Bombardment Group

- Constituted as 454th Bombardment Group (Heavy) on 14 May 1943

Activated on 1 June 1943
Redesignated 454th Bombardment Group, Very Heavy on 5 August 1945
Inactivated on 17 October 1945.

- Allotted to the reserve and activated on 27 April 1947

Redesignated 454th Bombardment Group, Medium on 27 June 1949
Inactivated on 16 June 1951
Redesignated 454th Troop Carrier Group, Medium on 26 May 1952
Activated on 13 June 1952
Inactivated on 1 January 1953
Redesignated 454th Bombardment Group, Heavy on 31 July 1985 (remained inactive)

=== Assignments ===
- Fourth Air Force 1 June – 31 July 1943
- Second Air Force 31 July – October 1943
- Third Air Force October–December 1943
- 304th Bombardment Wing, 25 January 1944 – c. 19 July 1945
- 20th Bombardment Wing 1 August – 17 October 1945
- 305th Bombardment Wing (later 305th Air Division), 27 April 1947 – 27 June 1949
- Fifteenth Air Force (attached to 91st Bombardment Wing), – 16 June 1951
- 454th Troop Carrier Wing, 13 June 1952 – 1 January 1953

=== Components ===
- 81st Fighter Squadron: 12 July 1947 – 20 June 1949
- 736th Bombardment Squadron (later Troop Carrier Squadron): 1 June 1943 – 17 October 1945, 27 April 1947 – 16 June 1951, 13 June 1952 – 1 January 1953
- 737th Bombardment Squadron (later Troop Carrier Squadron): 1 June 1943 – 17 October 1945, 12 July 1947 – 27 June 1949, 13 June 1952 – 1 January 1953
- 738th Bombardment Squadron (later Troop Carrier Squadron): 1 June 1943 – 17 October 1945, 16 August 1947 – 27 June 1949, 13 June 1952 – 1 January 1953
- 739th Bombardment Squadron: 1 June 1943 – 17 October 1945, 12 July 1947 – 27 June 1949

=== Stations ===
- Alamogordo AAF, New Mexico 1 June 1943
- Davis–Monthan Field, Arizona 1 July 1943
- McCook AAF, Nebraska c. 31 July 1943
- Charleston AAB, South Carolina 3 October – December 1943
- San Giovanni Airfield, Italy January 1944 – July 1945
- Sioux Falls AAF, South Dakota 1 August 1945
- Pyote AAF, Texas 17 August – 17 October 1945
- McChord Field, Washington, 27 April 1947 – 27 June 1949
- Spokane AFB, Washington, 27 June 1949 – 16 June 1951
- Portland International Airport, Oregon 13 June 1952 – 1 January 1953

=== Aircraft flown ===
- Consolidated B-24 Liberator, 1943–1945
- Boeing B-29 Superfortress, 1945
- Curtiss C-46 Commando, 1952–1953

=== Awards and campaigns ===
Award streamer	Award	Dates	Notes
	Distinguished Unit Citation	12 April 1944	Bad Vöslau, Germany
	Distinguished Unit Citation	25 July 1944	Linz, Germany

Campaign Streamer	Theater	Campaign	Notes
	Mediterranean Theater of Operations	Air Combat EAME Theater	
	Mediterranean Theater of Operations	Air Offensive, Europe	
	Mediterranean Theater of Operations	Rome-Arno	
	Mediterranean Theater of Operations	Normandy	
	Mediterranean Theater of Operations	Northern France	
	Mediterranean Theater of Operations	Southern France	
	Mediterranean Theater of Operations	North Apennines	
	Mediterranean Theater of Operations	Rhineland	
	Mediterranean Theater of Operations	Central Europe	
	Mediterranean Theater of Operations	Po Valley	

== Bibliography ==
- Maurer, Maurer, ed. (1983) [1961]. Air Force Combat Units of World War II (PDF) (reprint ed.). Washington, DC: Office of Air Force History. ISBN 0-912799-02-1. LCCN 61060979. Archived from the original (PDF) on 20 December 2016.
- Mueller, Robert (1989). Air Force Bases, Vol. I, Active Air Force Bases Within the United States of America on 17 September 1982 (PDF). Washington, DC: Office of Air Force History. ISBN 0-912799-53-6.
- Ravenstein, Charles A. (1984a). Air Force Combat Wings, Lineage & Honors Histories 1947–1977. Washington, DC: Office of Air Force History. ISBN 0-912799-12-9.
- Ravenstein, Charles A. (1984b). A Guide to Air Force Lineage and Honors (2d, Revised ed.). Maxwell AFB, AL: USAF Historical Research Center.
- Watkins, Robert A. (2009). Battle Colors: Insignia and Aircraft Markings of the U.S. Army Air Force in World War II. Vol. IV, European-African-Middle Eastern Theater of Operations. Atglen, PA: Shiffer Publishing, Ltd. ISBN 978-0-7643-3401-6.
