= 454th Bombardment Wing =

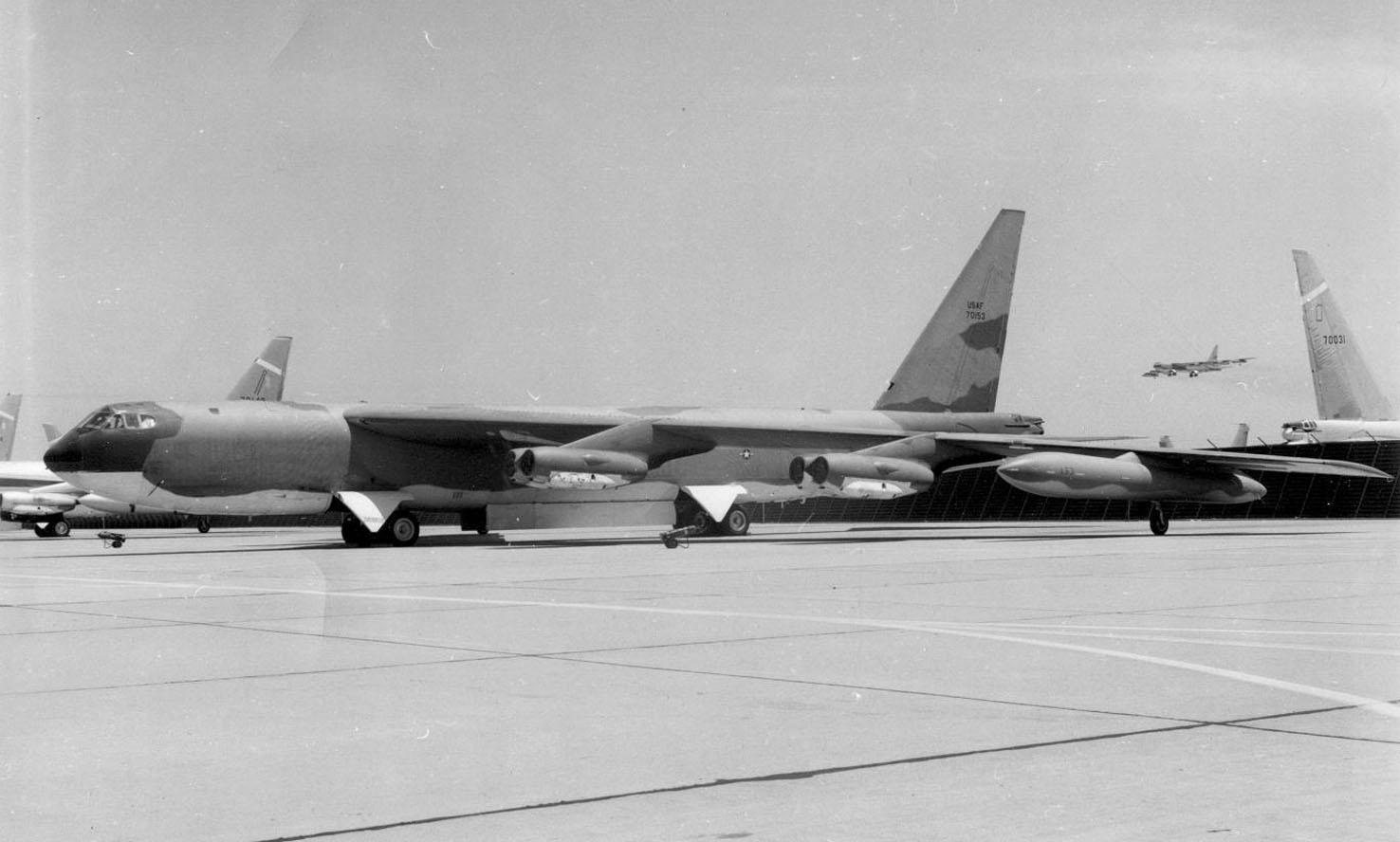
- Boeing B-52F Stratofortress 57-153
- Active: 1951–1952; 1962–1969
- Country: United States
- Branch: United States Air Force
- Role: Heavy bomber
- Motto: Deter or Destroy
- Engagements: Mediterranean Theater
- Decorations: Distinguished Unit Citation; Air Force Outstanding Unit Award

Insignia
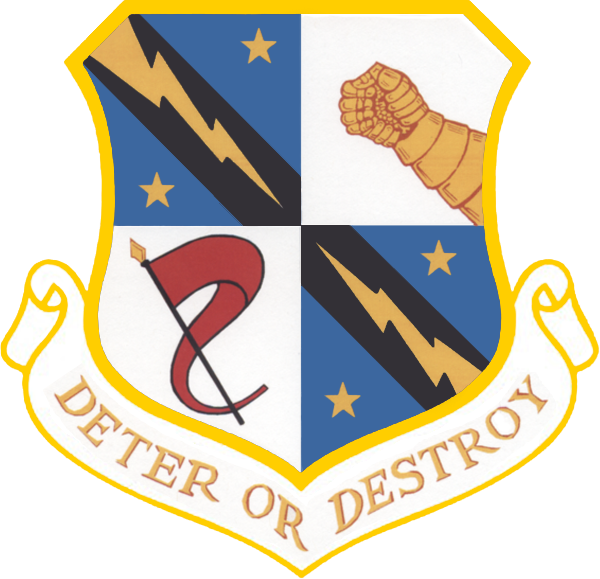
- 454th Bombardment Wing emblem (Note: Approved 19 August 1963.)

The 454th Bombardment Wing is an inactive United States Air Force unit. It was last assigned to the 42d Air Division of Strategic Air Command (SAC) at Columbus Air Force Base, Mississippi. It was inactivated on 25 July 1969.

The wing's predecessor was the 454th Bombardment Group, activated in 1943 as a United States Army Air Forces combat organization. It served primarily in the Mediterranean Theater of Operations during World War II. While in combat the group earned two Distinguished Unit Citations. The group served as a bombardment unit in the reserves after World War II.

The Wing was established during the Korean War as the 454th Troop Carrier Wing, a reserve organization at Portland International Airport, Oregon. It was discontinued six months later, when the 403d Troop Carrier Wing was released from active duty and assumed its mission, personnel and equipment. In 1962, the unit was redesignated as the 454th Bombardment Wing, and became part of SAC. Flying Boeing B-52 Stratofortress bombers, the 454th was integrated into SAC's combat forces in the Pacific and Southeast Asia. The 454th Bombardment Wing completed more than 100 missions to South Vietnam without losing a single bomber to enemy aircraft fire. The wing was inactivated in 1969 with the end of SAC operations from Columbus Air Force Base, Mississippi.

== History ==
=== Korean War ===
Continental Air Command established the 454th Troop Carrier Wing at Portland International Airport, Oregon in June 1952 to replace the 922d Reserve Training Wing, which had taken over reserve activities at Portland following the mobilization of the 403d Troop Carrier Wing. It was equipped with Curtiss C-46 Commandos. Its activation as a reserve transport unit was short, as it was inactivated and its mission, personnel and equipment transferred to the 403d Troop Carrier Wing when the 403d was released from active duty in January 1953.

=== Strategic Air Command ===
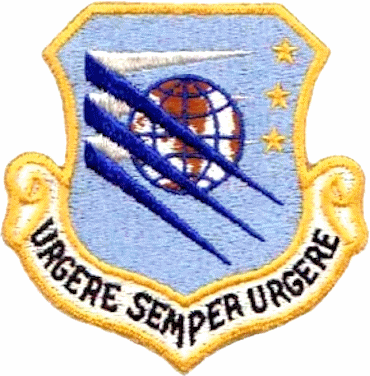
Patch with the 4228th Strategic Wing emblem

4228th Strategic Wing he origins of the assumption of the bombardment mission by the 454th began in 1955 when Strategic Air Command (SAC) took over Columbus Air Force Base, Mississippi, establishing the 4228th Air Base Squadron as a caretaker organization to prepare the base for use by strategic bombardment and air refueling units. On 1 July 1958 the squadron expanded to a group and the 4228th Strategic Wing was organized and assigned to the 4th Air Division to control the group and three maintenance squadrons. The wing's first operational squadron, the 901st Air Refueling Squadron, flying Boeing KC-135 Stratotankers, was activated a month later.

In March 1959, the 52d Aviation Depot Squadron was activated to oversee the wing's special weapons. The 4228th became fully organized on 15 June 1959 when the 492d Bombardment Squadron (BS), consisting of 15 Boeing B-52 Stratofortresses moved to Columbus from Carswell Air Force Base, Texas where it had been one of the three squadrons of the 7th Bombardment Wing. This was part of SAC's plan to disperse its strike force to reduce its vulnerability to a first strike by the Soviet Union. Starting in 1960, one third of the wing's aircraft were maintained on fifteen-minute alert, fully fueled and ready for combat to reduce vulnerability to a Soviet missile strike. This was increased to half the wing's aircraft in 1962. The 4228th (and later the 454th) continued to maintain an alert commitment until the 454th was inactivated except for periods when the wing's aircraft were deployed to support operations in Southeast Asia. In 1962, the wing's bombers began to be equipped with the GAM-77 Hound Dog air-launched cruise missiles, The 4228th Airborne Missile Maintenance Squadron was activated in November to maintain these missiles

In 1962, in order to perpetuate the lineage of many currently inactive bombardment units with illustrious World War II records, Headquarters SAC received authority from Headquarters USAF to discontinue its Major Command controlled (MAJCON) strategic wings that were equipped with combat aircraft and to activate Air Force controlled (AFCON) units, most of which were inactive at the time which could carry a lineage and history. (Note: MAJCON units could not carry a permanent history or lineage. Ravenstein, Guide to Air Force Lineage and Honors, p. 12)

454th Bombardment Wing As a result, the 4228th was replaced by the 454th Bombardment Wing, Heavy, which assumed its mission, personnel, and equipment on 1 February 1963. (Note: The 454th Wing continued, through temporary bestowal, the history, and honors of the World War II 454th Bombardment Group. It was also entitled to retain the honors (but not the history or lineage) of the 4228th. This temporary bestowal ended in 1969, when the wing was inactivated.) In the same way the 736th Bombardment Squadron, one of the unit's World War II historical bomb squadrons, replaced the 492d. The 858th Medical Group, 52d Munitions Maintenance Squadron and the 901st Air Refueling Squadron were reassigned to the 454th. Component support units were replaced by units with numerical designation of the newly established wing. Under the Dual Deputate organization, (Note: Under this plan flying squadrons reported to the wing Deputy Commander for Operations and maintenance squadrons reported to the wing Deputy Commander for Maintenance.) all flying and maintenance squadrons were directly assigned to the wing, so no operational group element was activated. Each of the new units assumed the personnel, equipment, and mission of the units being discontinued.

The 454th Bomb Wing conducted air refueling operations and trained in bombardment operations. It converted to the B-52D in 1965 for Vietnam operations. Once operationally ready with the B-52D, the 454th wing headquarters, staff, tactical aircraft and crews and maintenance personnel were integrated into SAC's combat forces in the Pacific and Southeast Asia. Elements of the 454th Bombardment Wing completed more than 100 missions to South Vietnam without losing a single bomber to enemy aircraft fire. In May 1967 General Edward O. Martin assumed command of the 454th Bombardment Wing at Columbus, and one month later he led the wing on its second deployment to the Western Pacific area in support of Southeast Asia operations and returned to Columbus in December 1967. In May 1968 the 454th Wing made its third deployment to the Western Pacific area, its second under the command of General Martin.

Some upgraded B-52Cs were also transferred from the 99th Bombardment Wing during 1968 and 1969 and were operated as crew trainers.

By 1969 as the demand for pilots to support the war in Southeast Asia increased, the number of B-52s based stateside fell because they were needed overseas. At the same time, Minuteman and Polaris missiles were taking their places in strategic deterrence, replacing much of the bomber alert force. In addition, funds were also needed to cover the costs of combat operations. The 454th Bombardment Wing was inactivated on 2 July 1969 and its aircraft were reassigned to other SAC units. As part of the inactivation, Columbus Air Force Base was transferred to Air Training Command and resumed a pilot training mission.

== Lineage ==
454th Bombardment Wing

- Constituted as 454th Troop Carrier Wing, Medium on 26 May 1952

Activated on 13 June 1952
Inactivated on 1 January 1953

- Redesignated 454th Bombardment Wing, Heavy on 15 November 1962 (not organized)

Organized on 1 February 1963
Inactivated on 2 July 1969.

=== Assignments ===
- Fourth Air Force, 13 June 1952 – 1 January 1953
- Strategic Air Command, 15 November 1962 – 1 February 1963 (not organized)
- 4th Air Division, 1 February 1963
- 42d Air Division, 1 July 1963 – 2 July 1969.

=== Components ===
Groups

- 454th Air Base Group (later 454th Combat Support Group): 13 June 1952 – 1 January 1953, 1 February 1963 – 2 July 1969
- 454th Maintenance & Supply Group: 13 June 1952 – 1 January 1953
- 454th Medical Group: 13 June 1952 – 1 January 1953
- 858th Medical Group: 1 February 1963 – 2 July 1969

Operational Squadrons

- 736th Bombardment Squadron: 1 February 1963 – 2 July 1969
- 901st Air Refueling Squadron: 1 February 1963 – 2 July 1969

Maintenance Squadrons

- 52d Munitions Maintenance Squadron: 1 February 1963 – 2 July 1969
- 454th Airborne Missile Maintenance Squadron: 1 February 1963 – 25 July 1968
- 454th Armament & Electronics Maintenance Squadron (later 454th Avionics Maintenance Squadron): 1 February 1963 – 2 July 1969
- 454th Field Maintenance Squadron: 1 February 1963 – 2 July 1969
- 454th Organizational Maintenance Squadron: 1 February 1963 – 2 July 1969

=== Stations ===
- Portland International Airport, Oregon 13 June 1952 – 1 January 1953
- Columbus Air Force Base, Mississippi, 1 February 1963 – 2 July 1969

=== Aircraft flown ===
- Boeing B-52 Stratofortress, 1963–1969
- Boeing KC-135 Stratotanker, 1963–1969

=== Awards ===
Award streamer	Award	Dates	Notes
	Air Force Outstanding Unit Award	1 December 1965 – 1 March 1966	
	Air Force Outstanding Unit Award	2 March 1966 – 1 April 1966 and 1 July 1967 – 31 December 1967	
	Air Force Outstanding Unit Award	1 July 1968 – 31 December 1968	

== See also ==
- List of B-52 Units of the United States Air Force
