= Operation Strangle (World War II) =

Military operation during World War II

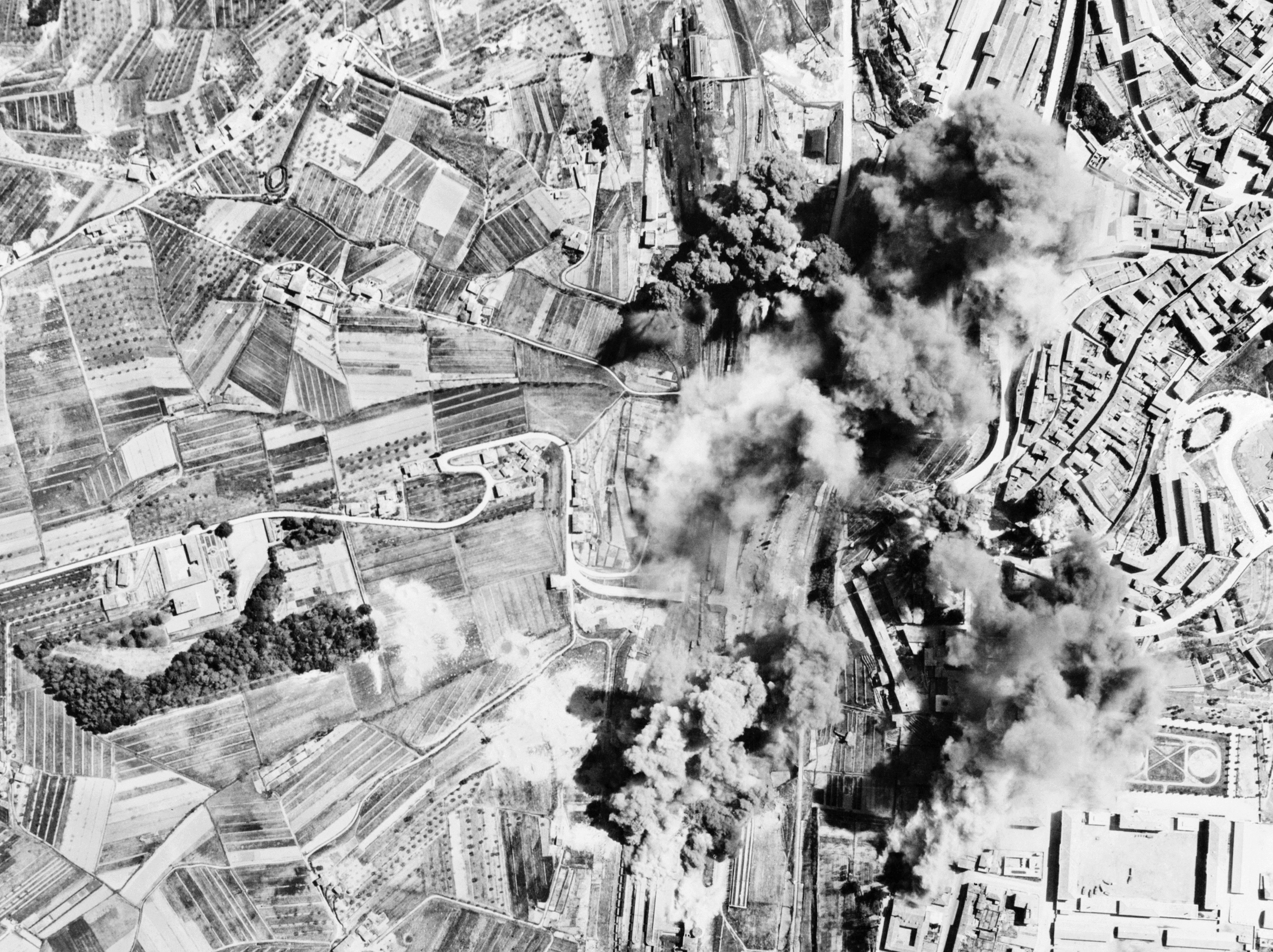
Aerial bombing of German railroad yards at Siena during Operation Strangle by Martin B-26 Marauder medium bombers on April 11 1944, On the alternate line from Pisa and Florence south to Rome, the Siena yards were bombed by Mediterranean Allied Air Force Bombers.

Operation Strangle was a series of air interdiction operations during the Italian Campaign of World War II by the Allied air forces to interdict German supply routes in Italy north of Rome from 19 March 1944 to 11 May 1944. Its aim was to prevent essential supplies from reaching German forces in Central Italy and compel a German withdrawal. The strategic goal of the air assault was to eliminate or greatly reduce the need for a ground assault on the region. The Allies failed in the overly ambitious objective of the campaign, namely the forced withdrawal of German forces from the Gustav Line, and did not curtail the flow of supplies. However, the air interdiction seriously complicated the German conduct of defensive operations and played a major role in the success of the subsequent Allied ground assault Operation Diadem.

Two principal interdiction lines were maintained across the narrow boot of Italy. This meant that no through trains were able to run from the Po Valley to the front line, and that south of Florence nearly all supplies had to be moved by truck. Over the course of eight weeks, the Allies flew 21,000 sorties (388 per day) and dropped 22,500 tonnes of bombs. The operation employed medium bombers and fighter bombers over a 150-square-mile (390 km^{2}) area from Rome to Pisa and from Pescara to Rimini.

== Background ==
The directive issued by the Mediterranean Allied Air Forces was "to reduce the enemy's flow of supplies to a level which will make it impracticable for him to maintain and operate his forces in Central Italy".

As the ground offensive had paused for General Alexander's forces to rest and regroup before carrying out Diadem, air assets that would normally have been used for close support of the battleline were available and used in Strangle. This included the light bombers and fighters of the US XII Air Support Command and the Desert Air Force when not engaged in maintaining air superiority.

The Mediterranean Allied Strategic Air Force (MASAF), Mediterranean Allied Tactical Air Force (MATAF) and Mediterranean Allied Coastal Air Force (MACAF) of the MAAF included both USAAF and RAF units. The MATAF and MACAF made up more than half of the 4000 aircraft available and included the fighter-bombers. The strategic force was given targets further to the north.

== Diadem phase ==
Operation Strangle achieved air superiority before Operation Diadem commenced. During Diadem, commanders continued interdicting supply lines but also conducted close air support to maintain air superiority. Some changes in target selection proved to have far-reaching effects on later military doctrine: a partial switch from rail to road targets, coupled with a concentration on the region closest to enemy lines, aimed to cripple the enemy by denying reliable transportation and reducing access to local supplies.

These efforts impaired but did not critically deplete German access to fuel and ammunition. The Germans used alternate routes and quickly repaired damaged points, especially at night and in bad weather, when the Americans could not bomb. German supply needs were low during the Operation Strangle, so in some respects they were able to maintain and even increase supplies.

The major benefit to the Allies of Operation Strangle was unintended: it reduced German troop mobility. The Germans had no reserve forces behind front lines and relied upon tactical mobility, so the inability to transfer forces quickly to weakly held points crippled their battle readiness. Three weeks after the ground campaign began, the Germans were in full retreat.

== Analysis ==
According to a 1972 Rand Corporation case study of the mission, Operation Strangle was an important milestone in the development of United States military interdiction doctrine. The report's conclusion was that the overriding objective of supply denial was unattainable. Interdiction was a relatively new military strategy at the time, and American commanders lacked adequate understanding of German supply methods. Although supply denial was not the sole mission of the operation, it remained the primary goal even after it had clearly failed. The effect on troop movement was incidental. According to the Rand report:

Interdiction was a relatively novel mission and there was a good deal of improvisation as the campaign went along. Fortunately for its success, the tactical air commanders and their pilots seem to have improvised in the right direction.
