= 71st Air Refueling Squadron =

Inactive US Air Force unit

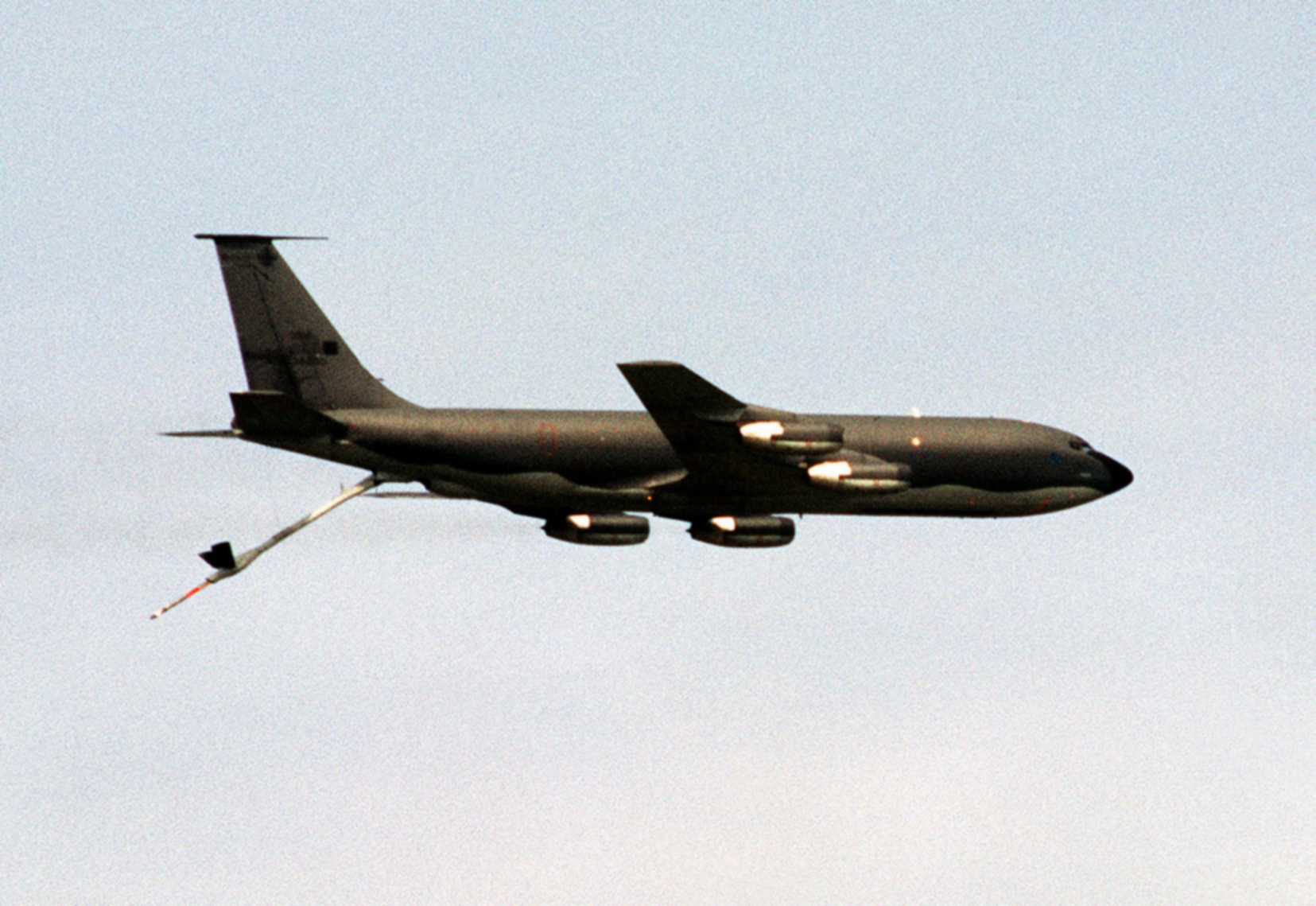
- KC-135A of the 71st Air Refueling Squadron during Exercise Proud Shield 92
- Active: 1942–1944; 1955–1994
- Country: United States
- Branch: United States Air Force
- Role: Aerial refueling
- Motto: Summa Observantia (Latin for 'The Ultimate in Service') (Note: Originally approved as Ultimus Servitium, which translates to Last in Servitude.)
- Decorations: Air Force Outstanding Unit Award

Insignia
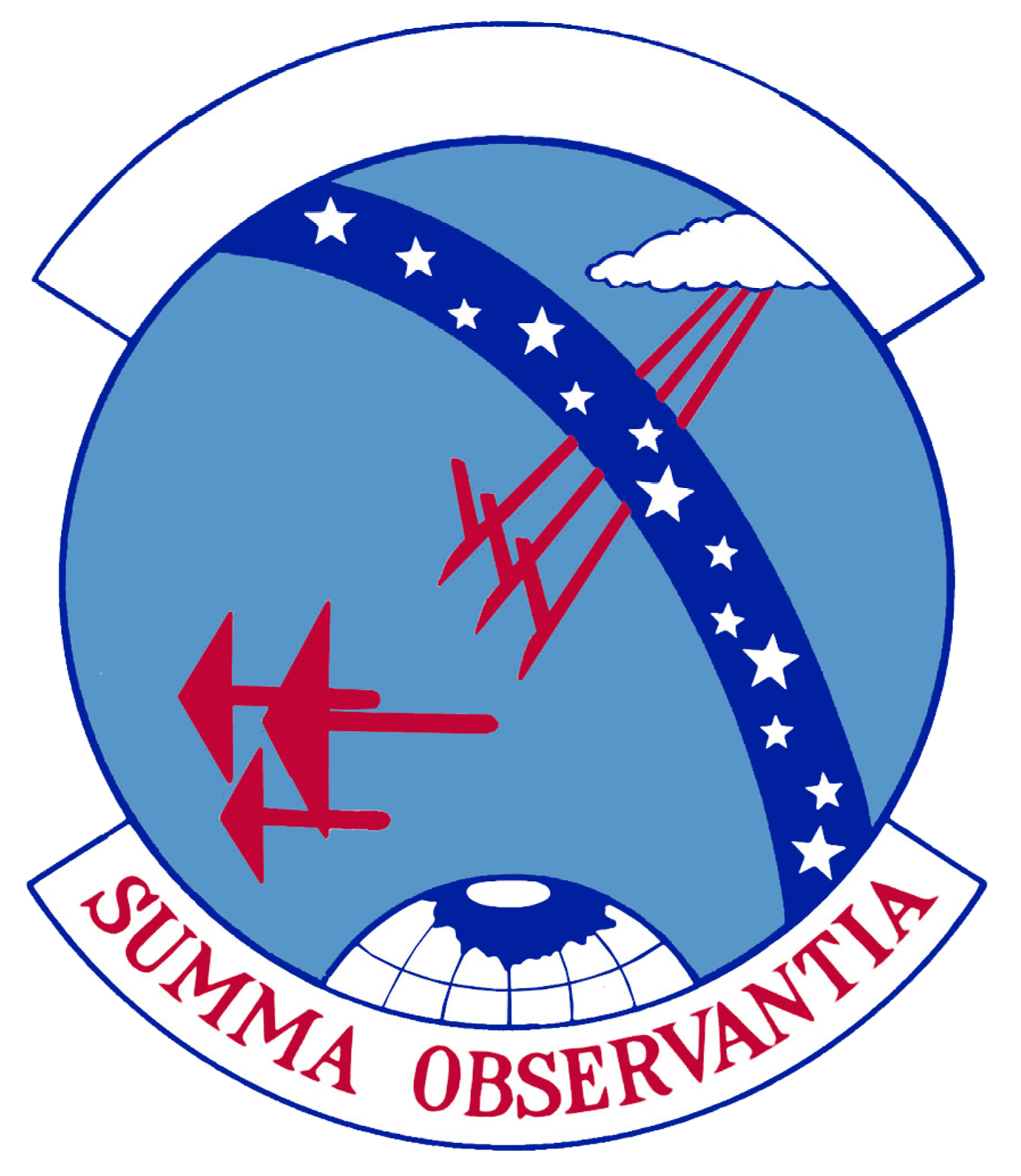
- 71st Air Refueling Squadron Emblem (Note: Approved 31 December 1959. Description: On a light blue disc, a white cloud issuing from sinister (left) chief, outlined Air Force blue, issuing from the cloud, bend sinisterwise, three red air refueling booms pointing to three red stylized aircraft in dexter (right); all above the top of a white globe issuing from base and grid lines of Air Force blue, over all, bendwise arched, an Air Force blue ribbon spattered with white stars. Significance: The emblem symbolizes the squadron's support to SAC through air refueling of bombers that provide the war deterrent force of the United States. Through its direct support, the squadron helps to further peace throughout the world. The emblem represents a refueling operation. The dark blue band with stars identifies the operation with the Strategic Air Command and represents the night refueling capability. The background represents the unit's daylight capability and the globe is symbolic of global operations.)

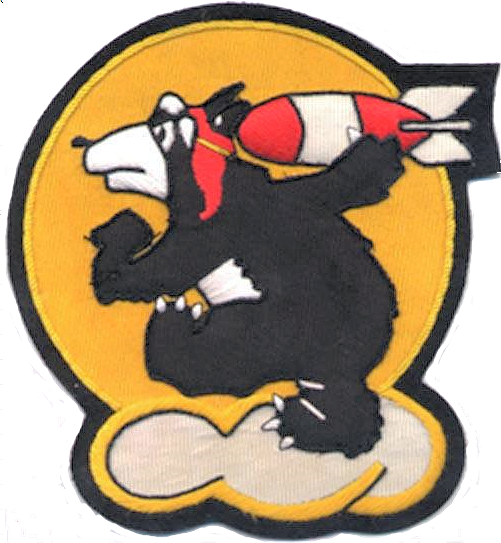
- 471st Bombardment Squadron Emblem (Note: Approved 5 February 1943. Description: In front of a yellow-orange disc, "Bomby" bear wearing a red aviator's helmet and white goggles, standing on a white cloud formation in base and pitching an orange and white aerial bomb with his right forepaw. The emblems of the four squadrons of the 334th Bombardment Group, featuring "Bomby-the-Bear" were featured in the National Geographic Magazine in June 1943. Hubbard, p. 714.)

The 71st Air Refueling Squadron is an inactive United States Air Force unit. It was last assigned to the 458th Operations Group at Barksdale Air Force Base, Louisiana where it was inactivated on 1 April 1994.

The squadron's first predecessor was activated as the 471st Bombardment Squadron in the summer of 1942 and assigned to the 334th Bombardment Group at Greenville Army Air Base, South Carolina. It operated as a North American B-25 Mitchell aircrew Replacement Training Unit until it was disbanded in the spring of 1944 in a general reorganization of Army Air Forces training and support units.

The 71st Air Refueling Squadron was activated in 1955 at Dow Air Force Base, Maine and equipped with Boeing KC-97 Stratofreighters. It originally supported Strategic Air Command (SAC) fighters at Dow, but when Dow's fighter wing moved, it acted as a forward based refueling unit for SAC bombers and for aircraft being ferried across the Atlantic. In March 1964 the squadron reequipped with Boeing KC-135 Stratotankers and when Dow closed in 1968, moved to Barksdale Air Force Base, Louisiana, remaining there until it was inactivated as part of reorganization of air refueling squadrons by Air Mobility Command in 1994. While it was stationed at Barksdale, the two squadrons were consolidated.

== History ==
=== World War II ===
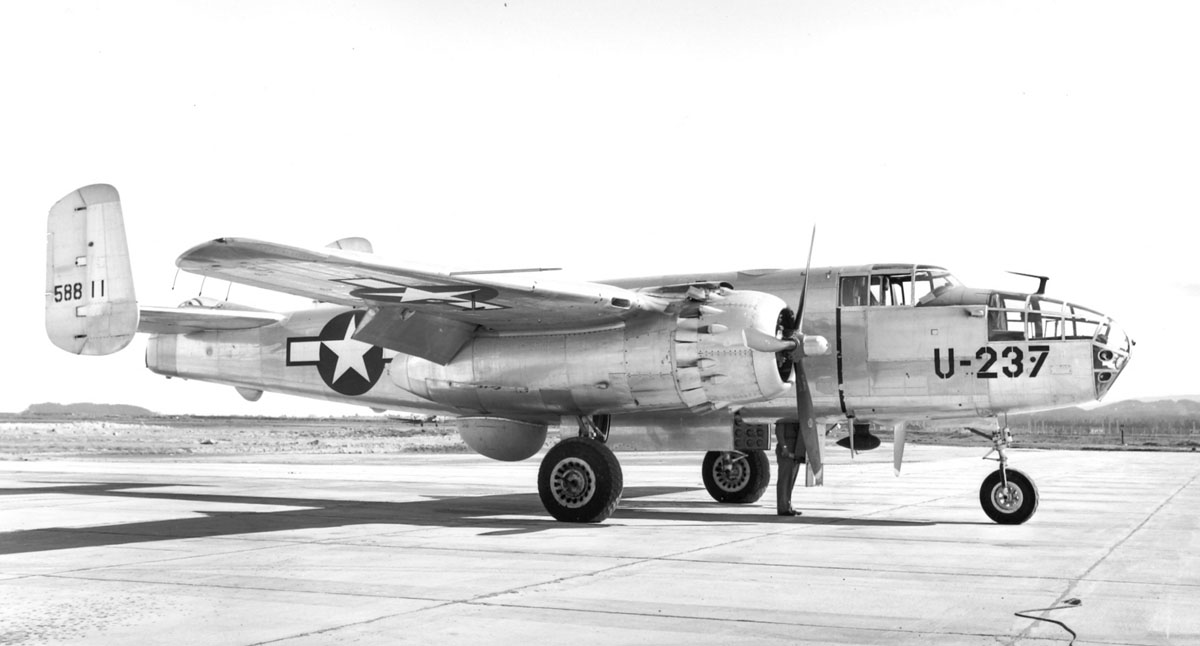
B-25 Mitchell as flown by the squadron during World War II

The squadron's first predecessor, the 471st Bombardment Squadron, was activated on 16 July 1942 as one of the four original squadrons of the 334th Bombardment Group at Greenville Army Air Base, South Carolina. It operated as a North American B-25 Mitchell Replacement Training Unit (RTU). RTUs were oversized units which trained individual pilots and aircrews prior to their deployment to combat theaters.

However, the Army Air Forces (AAF) found that standard military units, whose manning was based on relatively inflexible tables of organization were not well adapted to the training mission, particularly to the replacement training mission. Accordingly, a more functional system was adopted in which each base was organized into a separate numbered unit. This resulted in the 334th Group, its components and supporting units at Greenville, being disbanded in the spring of 1944 and being replaced by the 330th AAF Base Unit (Replacement Training Unit, Medium, Bombardment).

=== Air Refueling operations ===
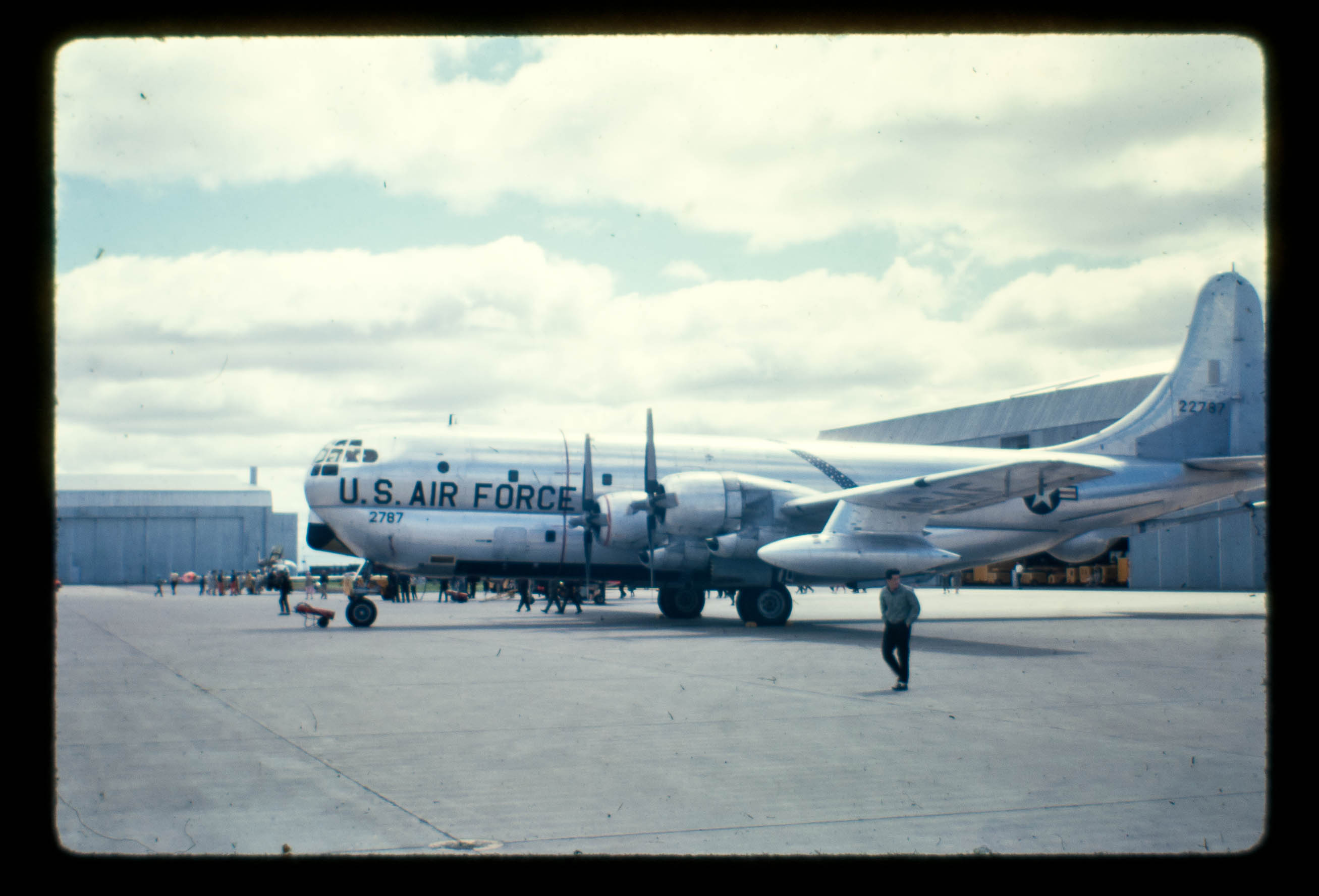
SAC KC-97 Stratofreighter

The 71st Air Refueling Squadron was activated at Dow Air Force Base, Maine in January 1955. The squadron was designated for refueling strategic fighters and was colocated with the 506th Strategic Fighter Wing at Dow. However the 506th moved to Tinker Air Force Base, Oklahoma in March, and the squadron was assigned directly to Eighth Air Force headquarters until the 4060th Air Refueling Wing was organized as the Strategic Air Command (SAC) wing at Dow. The squadron was equipped with Boeing KC-97F and KC-97G Stratofreighters. It was redesignated as a medium refueling squadron on 15 December 1957 and acted as a forward based refueling unit supporting Boeing B-47 Stratojet bombers and fighter aircraft deploying to and from Europe. SAC had begun to include refueling in its war plans, and its station at Dow placed it ahead of the faster Stratojets it would refuel, and on their programmed wartime route.

In February 1960, the 4038th Strategic Wing was activated at Dow. The 4038th Wing was established by SAC in a program to disperse its Boeing B-52 Stratofortress bombers over a larger number of bases, thus making it more difficult for the Soviet Union to knock out the entire fleet with a surprise first strike. SAC bases with large concentrations of bombers made attractive targets. SAC's response was to break up its wings and scatter their aircraft over a larger number of bases. The squadron continued to fly KC-97s, however, until 1964 when it reequipped with Boeing KC-135 Stratotankers. The KC-135 could deliver twice the amount of fuel to the B-52 without the losses caused by the descent and climb required to refuel with the KC-97.

The squadron provided air refueling primarily to the B-52s of the 4038th wing. Starting in 1960, One third of the squadron's aircraft were maintained on fifteen minute alert, fully fueled and ready for combat to reduce vulnerability to a Soviet missile strike. This was increased to half the squadron's aircraft in 1962. Soon after detection of Soviet missiles in Cuba, all degraded and adjusted alert sorties were brought up to full capability. On 24 October SAC went to DEFCON 2, placing all aircraft on alert. Forward deployed Tanker Task Forces increased from in Spain, Alaska and in the Northeast. On 21 November SAC went to DEFCON 3. On 27 November SAC returned to normal alert posture.

In February 1963, The 397th Bombardment Wing assumed the aircraft, personnel and equipment of the discontinued 4038th wing. The 4038th was a Major Command controlled (MAJCON) wing, which could not carry a permanent history or lineage, and SAC wanted to replace it with a permanent unit. The 71st was assigned to the newly activated 397th Bombardment Wing.

The squadron provided long range air refueling support and participated in military exercises and special operations. It deployed aircraft and aircrews to Europe, the Middle East, and Alaska supporting the European, Alaskan, and Pacific Tanker Task Forces while maintaining its combat readiness. The 71st also provided aircraft and aircrews that supported USAF operations in Southeast Asia.

Dow closed as an active USAF base in the spring of 1968 and the 397th Wing was inactivated. The 71st, however, relocated to Barksdale Air Force Base, Louisiana, along with the 596th Bombardment Squadron, where they were assigned to the 2d Bombardment Wing, remaining there until inactivation. In September 1985, the 471st Bombardment Squadron was consolidated with the 71st. When SAC implemented the Objective Wing organization in the fall of 1991, the squadron was reassigned to the newly activated 2d Operations Group, but this assignment lasted only until 1993 when Air Combat Command transferred its air refueling units to Air Mobility Command (AMC) in 1993. As AMC reorganized and consolidated its tanker fleet, it removed its tankers from Barksdale and the 71st was inactivated on 1 April 1994.

== Lineage ==
471st Bombardment Squadron

- Constituted as the 471st Bombardment Squadron (Medium) on 9 July 1942

Activated on 16 July 1942
Disbanded on 1 May 1944
Reconstituted on 19 September 1985 and consolidated with the 71st Air Refueling Squadron

71st Air Refueling Squadron

- Constituted as the 71st Air Refueling Squadron, Strategic Fighter on 4 November 1954

Activated on 24 January 1955
Redesignated 71st Air Refueling Squadron, Medium on 15 December 1957
Redesignated 71st Air Refueling Squadron, Heavy on 1 March 1964
Consolidated with the 471st Bombardment Squadron on 19 September 1985
Redesignated 71st Air Refueling Squadron on 1 September 1991
Inactivated on 1 October 1994

=== Assignments ===
- 334th Bombardment Group: 16 July 1942 – 1 May 1944
- Eighth Air Force: 24 January 1955 (attached to 506th Strategic Fighter Wing)
- 4060th Air Refueling Wing: 8 March 1955
- 4038th Strategic Wing: 1 February 1960
- 397th Bombardment Wing: 1 February 1963 (attached to 2d Bombardment Wing after 1 April 1968)
- 2d Bombardment Wing: 15 April 1968 (Note: Ravenstein agrees with this date in his entry for the 2d Wing. Ravenstein, p. 8. However, in his entry for the 397th Wing, he states the squadron was attached to the 2d Wing on 1 April and remained assigned to the 397th Wing until it inactivated on 25 April. Ravenstein, p. 213.)
- 2d Operations Group: 1 September 1991
- 458th Operations Group: 1 October 1993 – 1 April 1994

=== Stations ===
- Greenville Army Air Base, South Carolina, 16 July 1942 – 1 May 1944
- Dow Air Force Base, Maine, 24 January 1955
- Barksdale Air Force Base, Louisiana, 15 April 1968 – 1 June 1994

=== Aircraft ===
- North American B-25 Mitchell, 1942–1944
- Boeing KC-97 Stratofreighter, 1955–1964
- Boeing KC-135 Stratotanker, 1964-1994

=== Awards and campaigns ===
Award streamer	Award	Dates	Notes
	Air Force Outstanding Unit Award	1 July 1973 – 30 June 1975	71st Air Refueling Squadron
	Air Force Outstanding Unit Award	1 July 1979 – 30 June 1980	71st Air Refueling Squadron
	Air Force Outstanding Unit Award	1 July 1982 – 30 June 1984	71st Air Refueling Squadron
	Air Force Outstanding Unit Award	11 July 1986 – 30 June 1987	71st Air Refueling Squadron
	Air Force Outstanding Unit Award	1 July 1987 – 30 June 1989	71st Air Refueling Squadron

Service Streamer	Theater	Dates	Notes
	American Theater of World War II	16 July 1942 – 1 May 1944	471st Bombardment Squadron
