= Operation Redoubt =

Operation Redoubt was a series of military exercises during the late 1970s that occurred in three phases. It later lent its name to Exercise Paid Redoubt 80 and Exercise Redoubt Condor in 1981. It was conceived by Major General Richard Bodycombe in 1976 when he became the Vice Commander of the United States Air Force Reserve.

== Background ==
Operation Redoubt was conceived when Richard Bodycombe became Vice Commander of the United States Air Force Reserve after he realized that the command should revise its command and control procedures to reflect its new organizations. As a result, Operation Redoubt was created and sponsored by Headquarters, with the goal of making sure that all actions of the Air Force Reserve could be tested. This resulted in three phases, occurring in three subsequent years.

== Phase I ==
Phase I of Operation Redoubt occurred in 1977 when Headquarters tested its ability to deploy to its battle staff to an alternate command site, in addition to the monitoring of a unit notification test that was sent to all units of the Air Force Reserve.

== Phase II ==
Phase II occurred in May 1978 and unified the entire alert notification, mobilization, mobility, deployment, employment, redeployment, and demobilization process into one continuous operation. During the weekend of May 6 and 7, all units that were scheduled for unit training assemblies were put through the alert, recall, and mobilization phases, with some being deployed and redeployed. After adding in the lessons learned through Phase I, more than 18,000 reservists at 31 locations were processed in an average of 45 seconds. 20,000 members from 245 units took part in the exercises, with 1,000 members and 500,000 pounds of material deployed to other locations.

== Phase III ==
Phase III occurred in 1979 and consisted of the testing of mobilization for aircraft and deployed 1,000 persons to bases. At Bergstrom Air Force Base, the 924th Tactical Airlift Group tested mobilization procedures developed during Phase II. After the unit processed 251 members with an average time of seventeen seconds, Headquarters recommended adoption of the new procedures and eliminating the mobilization line, which took over one hundred seconds on average, per person. In addition to this, Phase III met Congressional and Department of Defense guidelines on testing and improving reserve mobilization and deployment capabilities.

== Legacy ==
Operation Redoubt later led its name to Exercise Paid Redoubt 80 in 1980 and Exercise Redoubt Condor in 1981, both of which continued upon the lessons learned from Operation Redoubt, and aimed to improve the United States Air Force Reserve. Redoubt Condor culminated in 1981 by being the largest Air Force Reserve mobilization at the time.
