= 472nd Electronic Combat Squadron =

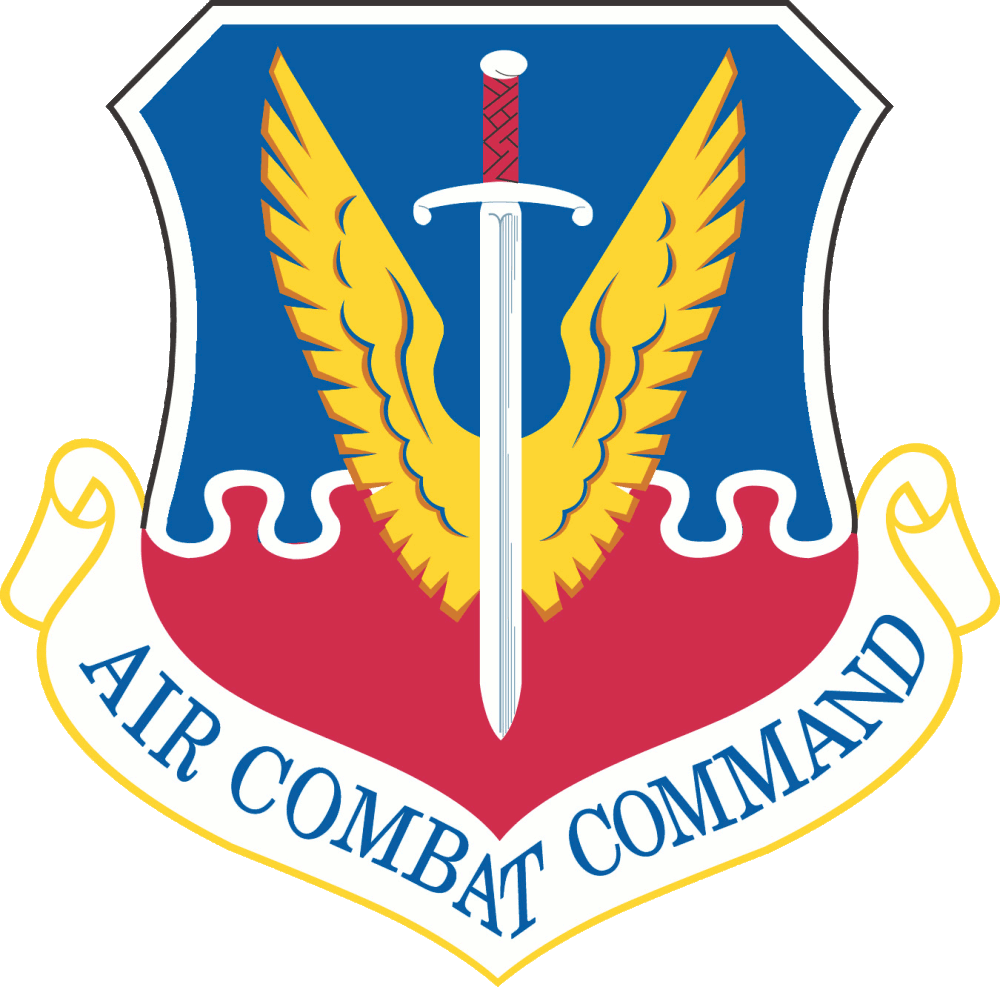
472nd Electronic Combat Squadron)

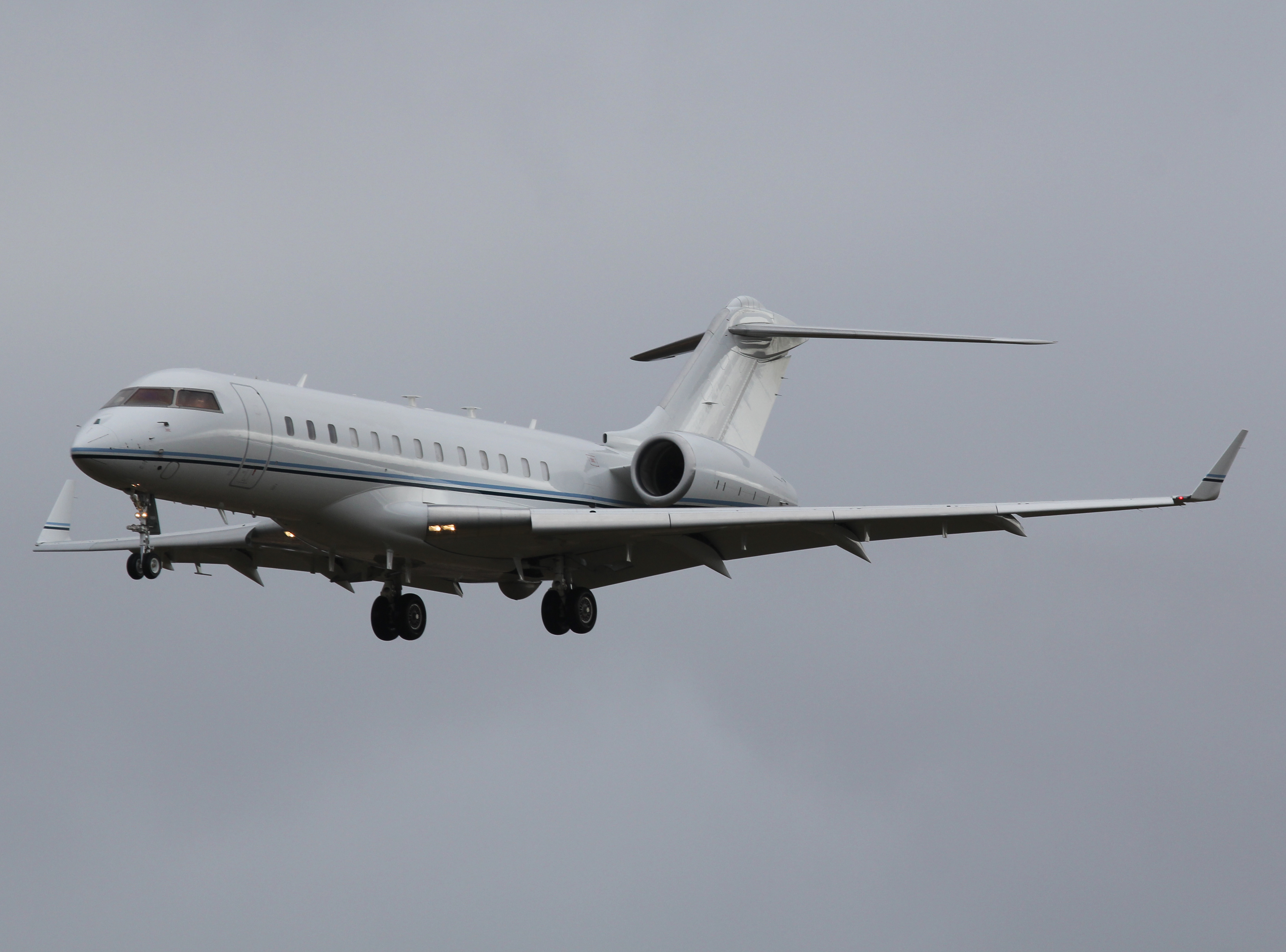
- Bombardier E-11A as flown by the squadron
- Active: 1942-1944; 1954-1957; 2025–present
- Country: United States
- Branch: United States Air Force
- Role: Electronic combat
- Part of: Air Combat Command
- Garrison/HQ: Robins AFB

Insignia
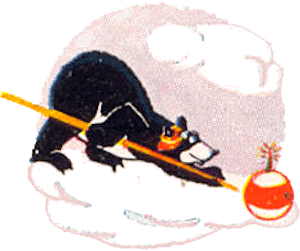
- 472nd Bombardment Squadron Emblem (Note: Approved 5 February 1943. Description: Over and through a light violet disc, "Bomby" bear wearing a red aviator's helmet and white goggles, shooting an orange and white bomb, lighted at the fuse, off the edge of a white cloud formation with a yellow pool cue stick. The emblems of the four squadrons of the 334th Bombardment Group, featuring "Bomby-the-Bear" were featured in the National Geographic Magazine in June 1943. Hubbard, p. 714..)

The 472nd Electronic Combat Squadron is an active United States Air Force unit. It was previously active in the reserve as the 472nd Fighter Bomber Squadron, stationed at Selfridge Air Force Base and Willow Run Airport from 1954 until it was inactivated in 1957.

In 1985, the 472nd Fighter-Bomber Squadron was consolidated with the 472nd Bombardment Squadron, which served as a Replacement Training Unit at Greenville Army Air Base, South Carolina, from 1942 until 1944, when it was disbanded in a general reorganization of Army Air Forces training and support units in the United States.

The consolidated unit was designated the 472nd Tactical Electronic Warfare Squadron. The 472nd was activated at Robins Air Force Base, Georgia as part of the 319th Operations Group on 1 May 2025.

== History ==
=== World War II ===
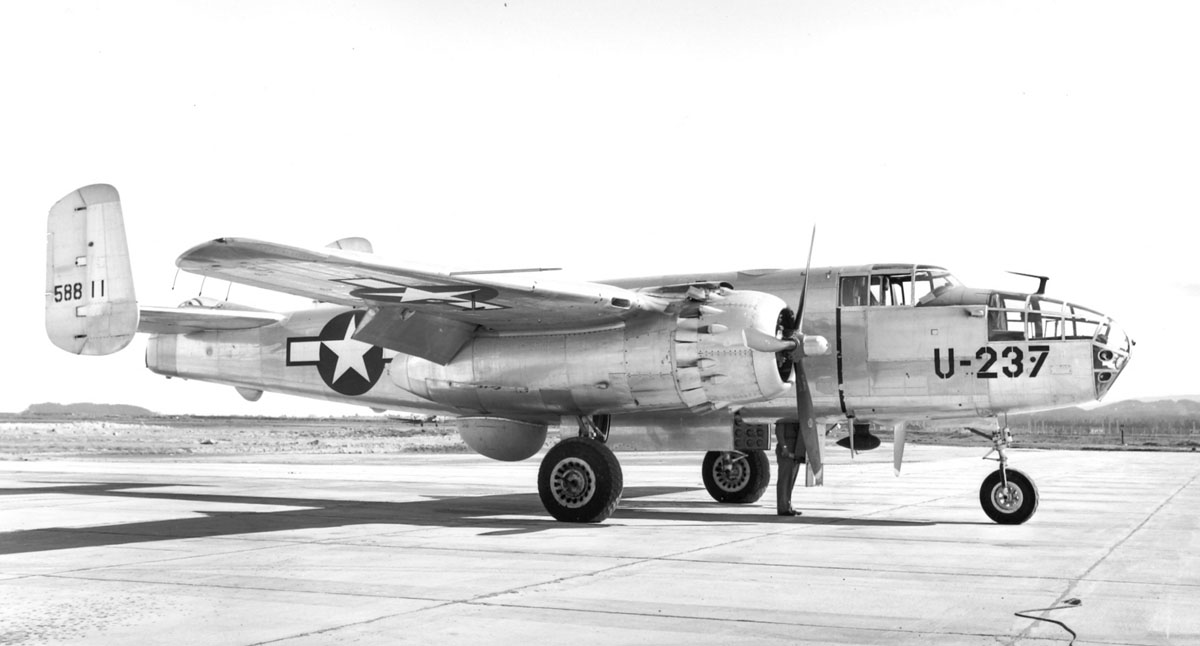
B-25 Mitchell as flown by the squadron during World War II

The squadron's first predecessor, the 472nd Bombardment Squadron, was activated on 16 July 1942 as one of the four original squadrons of the 334th Bombardment Group at Greenville Army Air Base, South Carolina. It operated as a North American B-25 Mitchell Replacement Training Unit (RTU). RTUs were oversized units which trained individual pilots and aircrews prior to their deployment to combat theaters.

However, the Army Air Forces (AAF) found that standard military units, like the 472nd, whose manning was based on relatively inflexible tables of organization were not well adapted to the training mission, particularly to the replacement training mission. Accordingly, a more functional system was adopted in which each base was organized into a separate numbered unit. This resulted in the 334th Group, its components and supporting units at Greenville, being disbanded in the spring of 1944 and being replaced by the 330th AAF Base Unit (Replacement Training Unit, Medium, Bombardment).

=== Reserve fighter operations ===
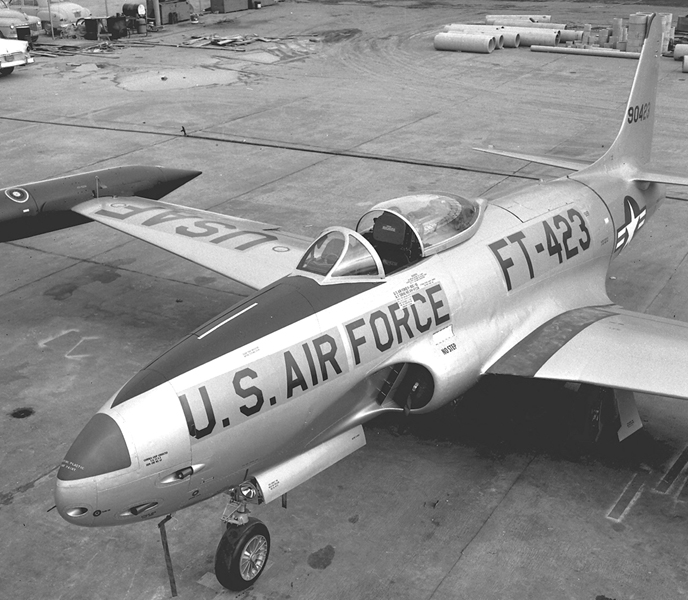
F-80 Shooting Star as flown by the squadron

The 472nd Fighter-Bomber Squadron was activated in the reserve at Selfridge Air Force Base, Michigan on 1 April 1954, and assigned to the 439th Fighter-Bomber Group, replacing the 92d Fighter-Bomber Squadron. (Note: On that same date, the regular Air Force's 92d Fighter-Interceptor Squadron was redesignated the 92d Fighter-Bomber Squadron, making the designation no longer available to Continental Air Command's reserve squadron. Maurer, Combat Squadrons, p. 310.) Its training was supervised by the 2242nd Air Force Reserve Combat Training Center (later the 2242nd Air Reserve Flying Center).

The squadron was originally equipped with Lockheed F-80 Shooting Stars, but re-equipped with Republic F-84 Thunderjets in 1956. (Note: Both Haulmen and Ravenstein say the 439th Wing stopped flying the F-80 in 1956, then operated the F-84. Ravenstein, p. 236; Haulman, AFHRA Factsheet. However, an undated, copyrighted photograph published in the Ann Arbor News in October 1957 shows the squadron still flying F-80s. See External links, below.) It also operated a variety of trainer and transport aircraft. Despite its fighter bomber designation, the unit was gained by Air Defense Command (ADC) upon mobilization. ADC required the squadrons it gained to be designed to augment active duty squadrons capable of performing air defense missions for an indefinite period after mobilization independently of their parent wing.

During the first half of 1955, the Air Force began detaching Air Force reserve squadrons from their parent wing locations to separate sites. The concept offered several advantages: communities were more likely to accept the smaller squadrons than the large wings and the location of separate squadrons in smaller population centers would facilitate recruiting and manning. As it finally evolved in the spring of 1955, the Continental Air Command’s plan called for placing Air Force reserve units at fifty-nine installations located throughout the United States. In this program, the squadron moved from Selfridge to Willow Run Airport, Michigan in late 1955.

During this period, the Joint Chiefs of Staff were pressuring the Air Force to provide more wartime airlift. At the same time, about 150 Fairchild C-119 Flying Boxcars became available from the active force. Consequently, in November 1956 the Air Force directed Continental Air Command to convert three reserve fighter bomber wings to the troop carrier mission by September 1957. In addition, within the Air Staff was a recommendation that the reserve fighter mission be given to the Air National Guard and replaced by the troop carrier mission. Cuts in the budget in 1957 also led to a reduction in the number of reserve squadrons from 55 to 45. The 439th Fighter-Bomber Wing was replaced by the 403d Troop Carrier Wing in November 1957 and the 472nd was inactivated without a replacement as reserve flying operations at Willow Run Airport terminated.

=== Electronic combat ===
The two squadrons were consolidated in 1985 as the 472nd Tactical Electronic Warfare Squadron. The squadron was redesignated the 472nd Electronic Combat Squadron and activated on 1 May 2025 at Robins Air Force Base, Georgia, when it assumed the mission, personnel, and Battlefield Airborne Communication Node Bombardier E-11As of the 18th Airborne Command and Control Squadron. The squadron is assigned to the 319th Operations Group, located at Grand Forks Air Force Base, North Dakota

== Lineage ==
472nd Bombardment Squadron

- Constituted as the 472nd Bombardment Squadron (Medium) on 9 July 1942

Activated on 16 July 1942
Disbanded on 1 May 1944
Reconstituted on 19 September 1985 and consolidated with the 472nd Fighter-Bomber Squadron as the 472nd Tactical Electronic Warfare Squadron

472nd Fighter-Bomber Squadron

- Constituted as the 472nd Fighter-Bomber Squadron and activated on 1 April 1954

Inactivated on 16 November 1957
Consolidated with the 472nd Bombardment Squadron on 19 September 1985 as the 472nd Tactical Electronic Warfare Squadron

472nd Electronic Combat Squadron

- Redesignated 472nd Electronic Combat Squadron on 21 March 2025

Activated 1 May 2025

=== Assignments ===
- 334th Bombardment Group, 16 July 1942 – 1 May 1944
- 439th Fighter-Bomber Group, 1 April 1954 - 16 November 1957
- 319th Operations Group, 1 May 2025 - present

=== Stations ===
- Greenville Army Air Base, South Carolina, 16 July 1942 – 1 May 1944
- Selfridge Air Force Base, Michigan, 1 April 1954
- Willow Run Airport, Michigan, 28 December 1955 – 16 November 1957
- Robins Air Force Base, Georgia, 1 May 2025 - present

=== Aircraft ===
- North American B-25 Mitchell, 1942–1944
- Lockheed F-80 Shooting Star, 1954-1956 (Note: Also equipped with trainer and transport aircraft 1954-1957.)
- Republic F-84 Thunderjet, 1956-1957
- Bombardier E-11A BACN, 2025-present

=== Service Streamer ===
Service Streamer	Theater	Dates	Notes
	American Theater of World War II	26 July 1942 – 1 May 1944	472nd Bombardment Squadron

== Notes ==
Explanatory notes

Citations
