= Richard Bodycombe =

United States Air Force major general (1922–2019)

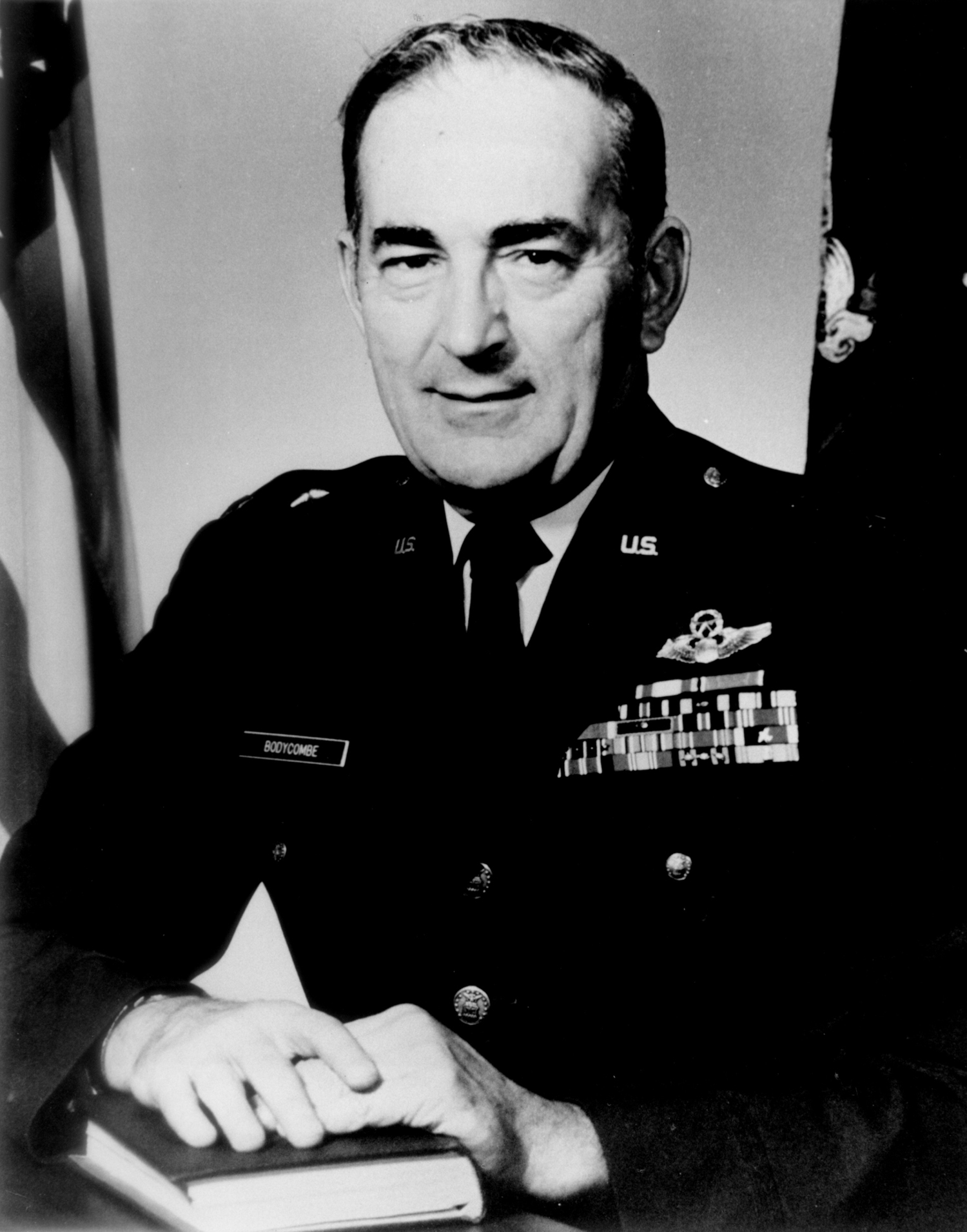
- Born: April 29, 1922; Pittsburgh, Pennsylvania, United States
- Died: January 23, 2019 (aged 96); Toledo, Ohio, United States
- Military career
- Allegiance: United States of America
- Branch: United States Air Force
- Service years: 1944–1982
- Rank: Major general
- Awards: Distinguished Service Medal, Legion of Merit, Distinguished Flying Cross, Air Medal with oak leaf cluster, Air Force Commendation Medal, Army Commendation Medal and Purple Heart.

Richard Bodycombe (April 29, 1922 – January 23, 2019) was a major general in the United States Air Force who served as commander of the United States Air Force Reserve Command, Headquarters U.S. Air Force, Washington D.C., and commander, Headquarters Air Force Reserve, a separate operating agency located at Robins Air Force Base, Georgia. As chief of Air Force Reserve he served as the principal adviser on Reserve matters to the Air Force Chief of Staff. As commander of AFRES he had full responsibility for the supervision of U.S. Air Force Reserve units around the world.

== Biography ==
Bodycombe was born in Pittsburgh in 1922. He received bachelor and Master of Science degrees in education from the University of Michigan in 1948 and 1952, respectively, the latter under the Air Force's Bootstrap Program. He received his commission as a second lieutenant in May 1944, after completing flying training at Turner Field, Georgia. Following transition training in B-24s at Davis-Monthan Air Force Base, Arizona, he reported to the 782nd Bombardment Squadron, 465th Bombardment Group, 15th Air Force, in Italy. When hostilities ceased in Europe, Bodycombe returned to the United States and was released from active duty. Recalled to active duty in January 1949, he was assigned to the 60th Troop Carrier Group at Wiesbaden Air Base, Germany, to participate in the Berlin airlift. When Operation Vittles was concluded, Bodycombe was assigned to the 7167th Special Air Missions Squadron at Wiesbaden for the remainder of his three-year tour of duty.

Bodycombe served for one year as aide to Major General Harry A. Johnson, commander, 10th Air Force, Selfridge Air Force Base, Michigan. Upon Johnson's retirement, Bodycombe's next assignment was to the 63rd Troop Carrier Wing, which was being organized at Altus Air Force Base, Oklahoma, in July 1953. He served as a C-124 aircraft commander in the 52nd Troop Carrier Squadron and later, when the 63rd Troop Carrier Wing transferred to Donaldson Air Force Base, South Carolina, he became assistant operations officer for the 63rd Troop Carrier Group.

In 1955 Bodycombe was selected for duty at the U.S. Air Force Academy, Lowry Air Force Base, Colorado, as part of the original cadre that set up the military training curriculum under the commandant of cadets. When Bodycombe reverted to Reserve status in February 1956 he was assigned to the 85th Troop Carrier Squadron at Chicago-O'Hare International Airport, flying C-46s. He then received a mobilization assignment to Headquarters 10th Air Force at Selfridge Air Force Base as an operations officer.

In 1960, when the 10th Air Force became the 5th Air Force Reserve Region, Bodycombe was named inspector general and later became assistant deputy chief of staff for operations. In November 1969 when the Central Air Force Reserve Region was formed, Bodycombe was assigned to the region headquarters at Ellington Air Force Base, Texas, as its first vice commander. From May 1972 to May 1975, he was mobilization assistant to the commander, 2nd Air Force, Barksdale Air Force Base, Louisiana. He next was assigned as mobilization assistant to the commander in chief, Strategic Air Command, Offutt Air Force Base, Nebraska. In July 1975 he was appointed a member of the secretary of the Air Force's Air Reserve Forces Policy Committee. The general was recalled to active duty in November 1976, to become vice commander of Headquarters Air Force Reserve at Robins Air Force Base. He assumed command of the Air Force Reserve in April 1979.

He was a command pilot with more than 16,500 flying hours, 5,500 of which were flown in jet and propjet aircraft. Bodycombe also holds a Federal Aviation Administration Pilot Proficiency Examiner rating in the Boeing 727, Lockheed JetStar and Convair 580. His military decorations and awards include the Distinguished Service Medal, Legion of Merit, Distinguished Flying Cross, Air Medal with oak leaf cluster, Air Force Commendation Medal, Army Commendation Medal and Purple Heart. Bodycombe's civic affiliations include the National Business Aircraft Association and Alpha Tau Omega. He was promoted to major general March 7, 1975, with date of rank July 11, 1973.

He retired on November 1, 1982, and latterly lived in Ann Arbor, Michigan. He died in January 2019 at the age of 96.
