= Issaqueena Bombing Range =

Coordinates: 34°44′27″N 82°51′41″W

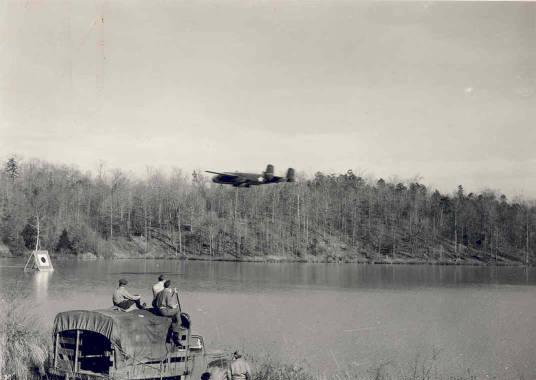
A B-25 Mitchell practices skip-bombing at the Issaqueena bombing range

The Issaqueena Bombing Range was a World War II target range used for training flight crews from Greenville Army Air Base, later renamed Donaldson Air Force Base. The Army Air Field was established in 1942 for the preparation of aircrew using North American B-25 Mitchell twin-engine bombers, and a suitable target area was established using Lake Issaqueena, northwest of Calhoun, South Carolina and Clemson University, completely within the Clemson Experimental Forest. Bombing Range Road is still located off of State Highway S-39-291, southwest of Six Mile, South Carolina and west of Lake Issaqueena.

== History ==
"On December 9, 1939, the Department of Agriculture and Clemson Agriculture [sic] College entered into a cooperative and license agreement. On June 27, 1942, the college granted the War Department an occupation permit for lands to develop the range. The War department [sic] also purchased an additional 265 acres within the boundaries of the target. The total area for the range summed 4,096 acres."

Three ranges were designated, the Practice Bombing Range, a land range, the Skip Bombing Range, and a Potential 3rd Target Range to the north which was apparently not used. Water targets with bullseyes, suspended on cables stretched across the lake were used for the skip-bombing practice in which low-flying bombers literally "skipped" their bombs off the water just like skimming a stone, the purpose of which was to allow accurate striking of target vessels on the water. A yellow dye was placed in the water immediately surrounding the target and used for scoring purposes, accomplished by visual approximation. The land range was used for medium-altitude target practice and had a 500-acre (2.0 km^{2}) impact area and included three 100-foot (30 m) circles with 500-foot (150 m) markers and three 54-foot (16 m) spotting towers. It consisted of 649 acres (2.63 km^{2}) located on top a hill east of the Keowee River and west of Lake Issaqueena. Munitions used were primarily M38A2 100-pound Practice Bombs (about 14 pounds without sand), with M1A1 Spotting Charges in the tailfin box.

Use of the range came to an end in September 1945 with the conclusion of wartime training and all personnel except for two caretakers were withdrawn. On December 17, 1945, the range was declared excess to the needs of the Army Air Force. Control of the Issaqueena Bombing Range was transferred from Greenville AAB to Shaw Field, later Shaw AFB, Sumter, South Carolina on January 14, 1946 with the deactivation of the Greenville operation. By May 1946 most of the structures and military property had been removed.

== First remediation ==
In 1954, Lake Issaqueena was drained for ecological renewal and numerous ("many thousands") sand-filled M38A2 100-pound Practice Bombs were seen in the lake bottom. The exposed bombs were disposed of in 1955. The lake was not completely drained and therefore the possibility of additional practice bombs in deeper portions of the lake exists.

== Second remediation ==
Concerns about possible hazards left from the wartime use led to the United States Army Corps of Engineers conducting a site inspection in 2006. This was to "discern the presence or absence of munitions and explosives of concern (MEC) and munitions constituents (MC) within the three designated Munitions Response Sites (MRS)." The SI was conducted from August 21, 2006 to August 25, 2006, and September 6, 2006.

"The work was performed under Contract No. W912DY-04-D-0005, Task Order No. 0008 from the United States Army Corps of Engineers, Engineering and Support Center, Huntsville (USAESCH)."
