= 334th Bombardment Group =

334th Bombardment Group (later 334th Air Refueling Wing, 334th Air Expeditionary Group)
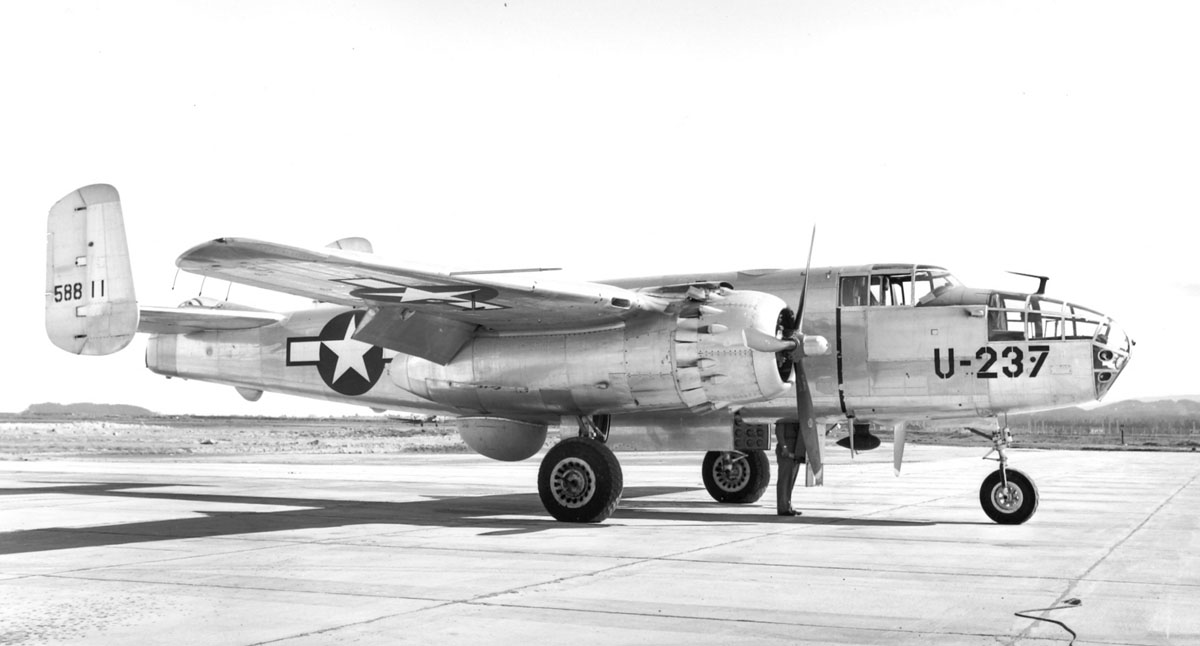
- B-25 Mitchell of a Replacement Training Unit
- Active: 1942–1944
- Country: United States
- Branch: United States Air Force
- Role: medium bomber training
- Engagements: American Theater of World War II

Insignia
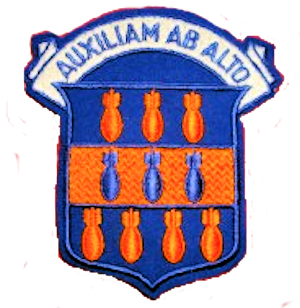
- Patch with the 334th Bombardment Group emblem

The 334th Bombardment Group is an inactive United States Air Force unit. From 1942 to 1944, it served as a Replacement Training Unit at Greenville Army Air Base, South Carolina. It was disbanded on 1 May 1944 in a reorganization of Army Air Forces training units. The group was reconstituted in 1985 as the 334th Air Refueling Wing. It was converted to provisional status in 2005 as the 334th Air Expeditionary Group and has been activated for exercises.

== History ==
The 334th Bombardment Group was activated on 16 July 1942 at Greenville Army Air Base, South Carolina. Its original components were the 470th, 471st, 472d and 473d Bombardment Squadrons, and the group was equipped with North American B-25 Mitchells. It became part of Third Air Force, which was responsible for the majority of medium bomber training for the Army Air Forces (AAF).

The 354th acted as a Replacement Training Unit (RTU) for the B-25. The RTU was an oversized unit which trained individual pilots and aircrews, after which they would be assigned to operational units. However, the AAF found that standard military units, whose manning was based on relatively inflexible tables of organization were not well adapted to the training mission. Accordingly, it adopted a more functional system in which each base was organized into a separate numbered unit, manned according to the base's specific needs. As this reorganization was implemented in the spring of 1944, the 334th Group, its components and supporting units at Greenville, were disbanded on 1 May and replaced by the 330th AAF Base Unit (Medium, Bombardment).

The emblems of the group's four squadrons were variations of "Bomby the Bear", and were featured in a National Geographic article about military insignia.

The group was reconstituted in July 1985 as the 334th Air Refueling Wing, but remained in inactive status. It was converted to provisional status as the 334th Air Expeditionary Group and assigned to Air Combat Command (ACC) to activate or inactivate as needed. ACC activated the group in 2007 for Exercise Ardent Sentry It was again active to control exercise units in July 2010

== Lineage ==
- Constituted as the 334th Bombardment Group (Medium) on 9 July 1942

Activated on 16 July 1942
Disbanded on 1 May 1944

- Reconstituted on 31 July 1985 and redesignated 334th Air Refueling Wing
- Converted to provisional status and redesignated 334th Air Expeditionary Group on 21 October 2005

Activated on 9 May 2007
Inactivated on 23 May 2007
Activated 5 July 2010
Inactivated c. July 2010

=== Assignments ===
- Third Air Force, 16 July 1942 – 1 May 1944
- Air Combat Command, to activate or inactivate as needed after 21 October 2005

1st Aerospace Expeditionary Task Force, 9 May–23 May 2007
1st Air And Space Expeditionary Task Force, 5 July 2010–c. July 2010

=== Components ===
- 334th Expeditionary Medical Operations Squadron: 9 May–23 May 2007
- 470th Bombardment Squadron: 16 July 1942 – 1 May 1944
- 471st Bombardment Squadron: 16 July 1942 – 1 May 1944
- 472d Bombardment Squadron: 16 July 1942 – 1 May 1944
- 473d Bombardment Squadron: 16 July 1942 – 1 May 1944

=== Stations ===
- Greenville Army Air Base, South Carolina, 16 July 1942 – 1 May 1944
- Camp Atterbury, Indiana, 9 May–23 May 2007
- Camp A. P. Hill, Virginia, 5 July 2010–c. July 2010

=== Aircraft ===
- North American B-25 Mitchell, 1942–1944
