= Exercise Redoubt Condor =

Exercise Redoubt Condor was a United States Air Force Reserve exercise that occurred in 1981 and was headquartered at Westover Air Reserve Base. It was designed to be a continuation of Operation Redoubt, a series of exercises that tested the mobilization capabilities of the Air Force Reserve. It was the largest mobilization of the Air Force Reserve in its history. Redoubt Condor culminated in 1981 by being the largest Air Force Reserve mobilization at the time.
