= Donaldson Air Force Base =

US base in Greenville County, South Carolina

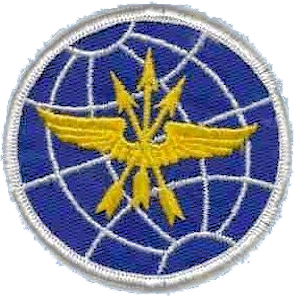
Donaldson Air Force Base Greenville Army Air Base
- Greenville County, near Greenville, South Carolina
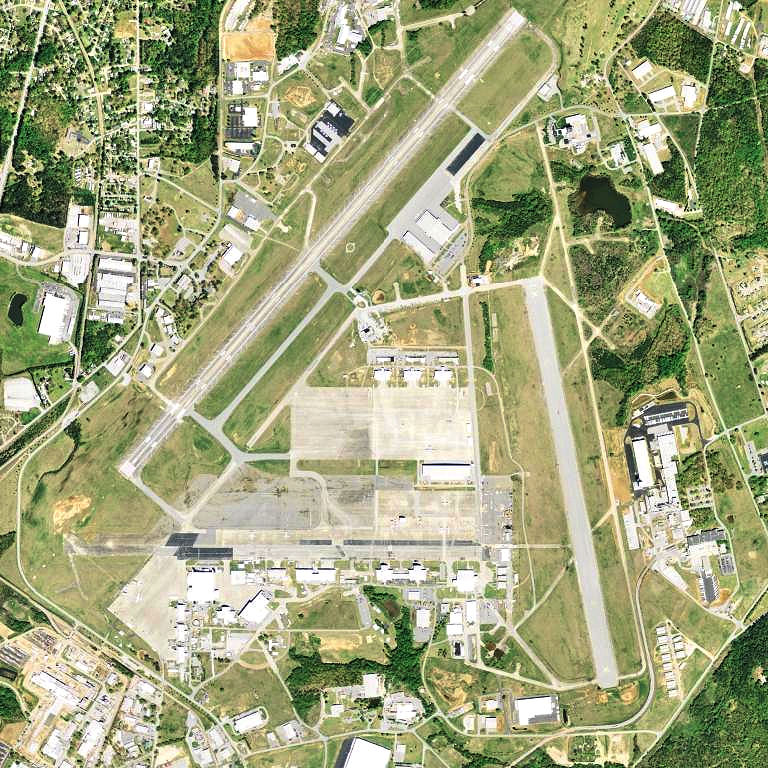
- USGS 2006 airphoto

Site information
- Type: Air Force Base
- Owner: Greenville, South Carolina; Greenville County, South Carolina
- Controlled by: United States Air Force

Location
- Location within South Carolina
- Coordinates: 34°45′30″N 82°22′35″W

Site history
- Built: 1942
- In use: 1942–1963

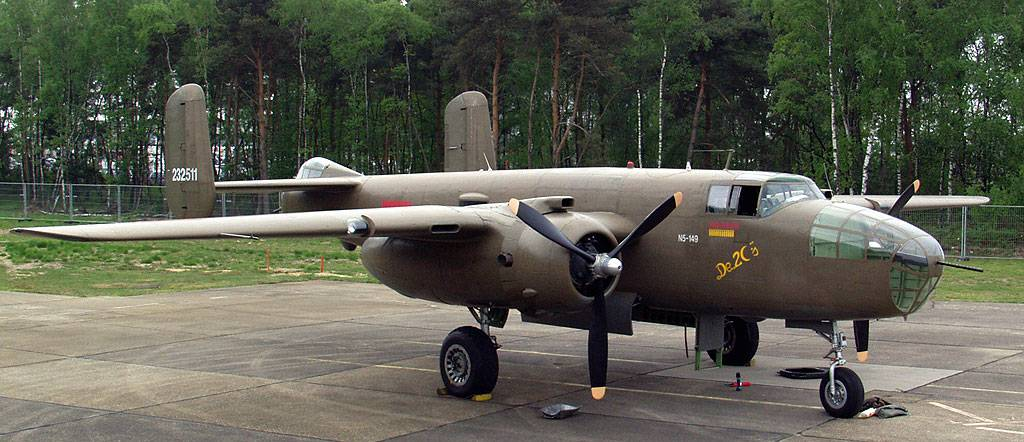
B-25 Mitchell medium bomber.

Donaldson Air Force Base is a former facility of the United States Air Force located south of Greenville, South Carolina. It was founded in 1942 as Greenville Army Air Base; it was deactivated in 1963 and converted into a civilian airport. It is currently an active airfield known as Donaldson Center Airport.

It was used by the United States Army Air Forces' Third Air Force as a B-25 Mitchell medium bomber training airfield during World War II. It was home to C-124 Globemaster II transports and called "The Airlift Capital of the World" for its role in the Berlin airlift, Korean War, and Cold War, being assigned to both Tactical Air Command (TAC) and the Military Air Transport Service (MATS).

== History ==
Originally named Greenville Army Air Base when opened in 1942, and later Greenville Air Force Base in 1948, (Note: Greenville Air Force Base, South Carolina should not be confused with Greenville Air Force Base, Mississippi. That base opened as Greenville Army Air Field in 1941 as a gunnery training field. It closed after the end of World War II, but was reactivated in February 1951 as Greenville Air Force Base, closing in October 1966.) the base was renamed in March 1951 as Donaldson Air Force Base in honor of Captain John Owen Donaldson, (1897–1930). Donaldson spent his boyhood in Greenville, South Carolina, attending Greenville High School, Furman University and Cornell University before joining the Royal Flying Corps and (after April 1918) the Royal Air Force in World War I. He became an ace, with eight victories, and was decorated by Great Britain, the United States and Belgium. Becoming an air racer after the war, Donaldson was killed on 7 September 1930 after winning the American Legion Air Race in Philadelphia when his plane spun out of control. He had won the Mackay Gold Medal for taking first place in the Army's transcontinental air race in October 1919.

=== World War II ===
In the early 1940s, the War Department selected Greenville, South Carolina as the site for a new Army airfield to support the buildup for World War II. The airfield was completed in May 1942, and in June, Greenville Army Air Base was officially activated as a B-25 Mitchell medium twin-engine bomber training base.

Greenville AAB was assigned to the III Bomber Command of the Third Air Force. The 342d Army Air Force Base Unit was assigned as the host unit for the airfield. The 342d provided such as logistics, maintenance, facilities, security and general administration. Isaqueena Bombing Range was established on and near Lake Isaqueena in the Clemson University Experimental Forest about 27 miles (43 km) to the west. Greenville AAB also controlled Coronaca Army Airfield as a sub-base for its training mission.

The operational training unit (OTU) at Greenville AAB was the 334th Bombardment Group, being assigned on 16 July 1942. Its flying squadrons were the 470th, 471st, 472nd, and 473rd Bombardment squadrons, flying B-25 Mitchell medium bombers. The 334th's mission was to provide flying training to personnel and bomber crews.

The 334th was inactivated on 1 May 1944 with personnel and equipment being reassigned to the 330th Army Air Forces Base Unit (Replacement Training Unit/Medium Bombardment). On 1 January 1945, the 330th was redesignated as the 128th Army Air Force Base Unit in conjunction with the base's reassignment to the First Air Force.

The 56th Combat Training Wing became the overall commanding unit at Greenville AAB on 1 May 1945, being reassigned from Morris Field, North Carolina which was closed. Its mission was to perform training and processing of bombardment replacement crews for overseas duty and the training of permanent party instructor personnel with the view of qualifying all personnel assigned for overseas duty.

==== 90th Bombardment Group ====
The first combat unit assigned to Greenville for training was the 90th Bomb Group (Heavy), which was assigned on 21 June 1942 and flew Consolidated B-24 Liberator heavy bombers. The unit consisted of four squadrons: 319th, 320th, 321st, and 400th Bombardment Squadrons.

With its training completed, the group transferred to Ypsilanti, Michigan on 18 August 1942 for follow-on training near Ford's Willow Run aircraft manufacturing plant. After another transfer (to Hickam Field in Hawaii), in early November 1942, the 90th BG transferred to the Pacific theater, being stationed at Townsville, Queensland, Australia with the Fifth Air Force.

==== 310th Bombardment Group ====
The 310th Bomb Group (Medium) trained at Greenville Army Air Base between 18 September and 17 October 1942, flying North American B-25 Mitchell medium bombers. The unit consisted of four squadrons: 379th, 380th, 381st, and 428th Bombardment Squadrons.

With its training completed, the group went overseas, transferring to Médiouna Airfield, in French Morocco with the Twelfth Air Force.

With the departure of the 310th, the 334th began training personnel for assignment as replacements, rather than complete bomb groups. After training was completed, the personnel would be assigned overseas to existing units in the wartime theaters.

=== Photographs ===
Photographs of the WWII base and soldiers can be viewed in the Greenville County Library System digital collections.

=== Postwar era ===
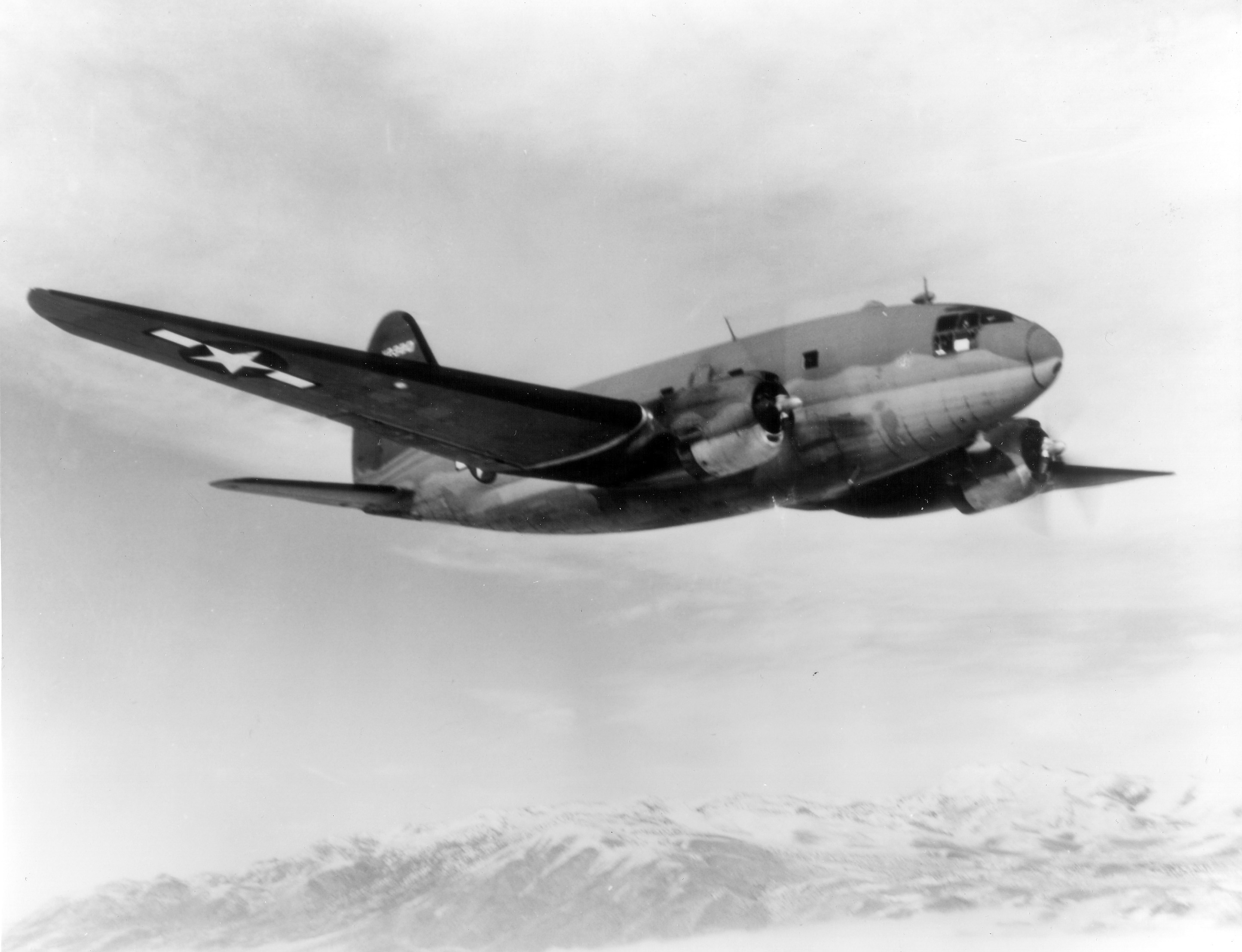
C-46 Commando

In the summer of 1945, with the war coming to an end, a number of training bases were slated for closure. This included Greenville Army Air Base, which was placed on standby status in November 1945. However, there were plans made by the Army Air Force for its continuing use. One of the lessons of World War II was that the airplane was invaluable in the support of ground forces, both in the close air support and transport role.

Tactical Air Command (TAC) was established as one of the post-war Army Air Forces' three major commands. The USAAF Troop Carrier Command (TCC) was inactivated as part of this reorganization and the Third Air Force was reassigned from the disbanding Continental Air Forces. TAC assumed command of the Troop Carrier transport mission and assigned it to the Third Air Force on 21 March 1946, which was assigned to Greenville AAB.

At Greenville, the Third Air Force was assigned a mixture of C-46 Commando and C-47 Skytrain aircraft and several Air Force Reserve troop carrier groups. Also, surplus C-54 Skymasters that had been originally purchased for Air Transport Command (ATC) were made available for troop carrier use.

The Third Air Force was inactivated on 1 November 1946, being replaced by the Ninth Air Force, which had just returned from Europe. With the establishment of the United States Air Force as an independent service branch in September 1947, the airfield was renamed Greenville Air Force Base. In the late 1940s many of TAC's Troop Carrier Groups/Wings were assigned directly to HQ TAC with the rest to the Air Force Reserve' Fourteenth Air Force and 302d Air Division. Greenville AFB remained an administrative facility for several years, maintaining aircraft and providing training to these Air Force Reserve units.

During the Berlin Blockade in 1948, Air Force Reserve troop carrier groups at Greenville AFB deployed C-54s to Germany to replace the C-47s that began the Berlin Airlift to sustain the 'Großstadt'. At least one C-82 Packet, an early version of the C-119 Flying Boxcar, also participated in the airlift for several weeks.

In 1949, a 0.5-mile dirt car racing track was built just south of the base. The track took the name "Air Base Speedway", as a nod to the nearby airfield. The track held a NASCAR Grand National race on August 25, 1951. Noted race driver Bob Flock won the race in an Oldsmobile. The track closed down in 1952.

=== Korean War ===
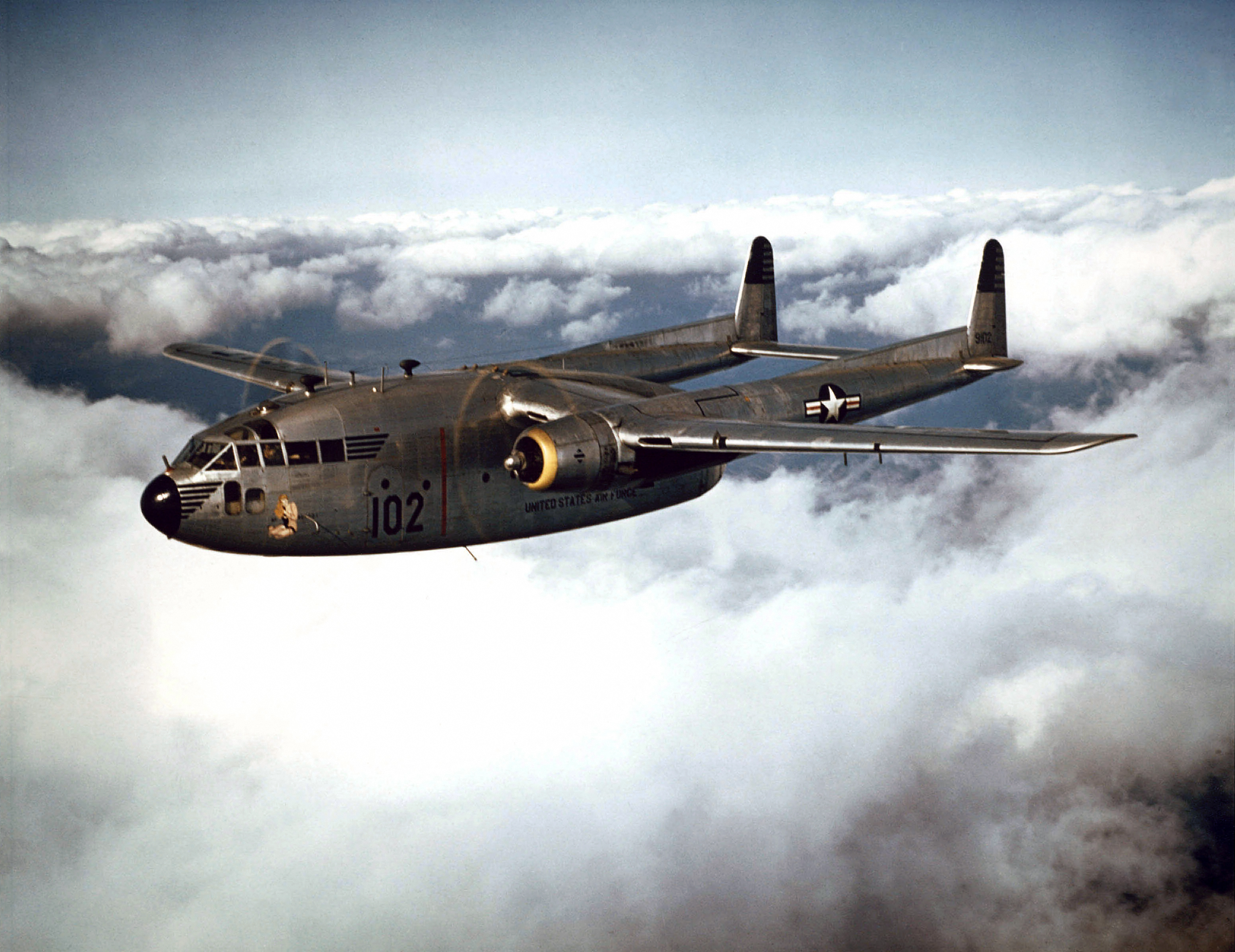
C-119 "Flying Boxcar"

The theater troop carrier mission was expanded rapidly during the Korean War when many of these reserve units were elevated to active service and assigned directly to HQ TAC.

HQ TAC ordered the 315th Troop Carrier Group to deploy from Greenville AFB to Brady Air Base, Japan with C-46 Commando transports. Also the 314th Troop Carrier Group was ordered to Japan with the new C-119 Flying Boxcar to support the United Nations forces in the conflict. The 314th was ordered to Japan primarily to support the 187th Regimental Combat Team, a United States Army airborne unit that was on its way to Japan by ship, but when the aircrews arrived, they found themselves heavily involved in logistical support operations between Japan and South Korea as well as performing combat cargo airdrops and the occasional airborne parachute operation.

On 16 October 1950, the 375th Troop Carrier Wing was activated at Greenville AFB. The 375th was an Air Force Reserve unit previously based at Greater Pittsburgh Airport. After a period of intensive training, the C-82s of the 375th participated in troop carrier and airlift operations, paratroop drops, and other exercises until being returned to the reserves in July 1952. Its aircraft at Donaldson were taken over by the newly activated 17th Troop Carrier squadron. The older C-82s were replaced by C-119s in 1953 and the 17th remained on active duty until 21 July 1954 when it returned to reserve status.

Also on 16 October 1950, the Air Force Reserve's 433d Troop Carrier Wing was activated, its three squadrons flying the C-119. On 20 July 1951, the wing was reassigned to USAFE and ordered to Rhein-Main Air Base, West Germany.

The 57th Troop Carrier Squadron flew the C-82 Packet and C-45 cargo planes. Between 20 February and 11 April 1952, the unit operated on temporary duty from Brownwood Municipal Airport, performing paratroop drops and other exercises in support of Army maneuvers.

=== Eighteenth Air Force operations ===
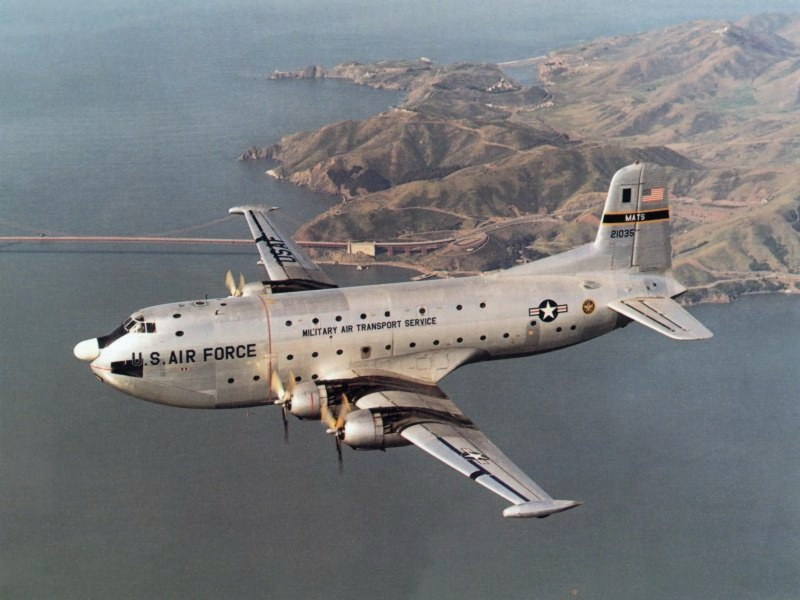
USAF C-124 Globemaster II

In March 1951 the base was renamed 'Donaldson Air Force Base' and on 26 June, the Eighteenth Air Force was activated in 1951 to discharge Tactical Air Command's troop carrier responsibilities. Its mission was to organize, administer, equip, train, and prepare for combat troop carrier missions.

The Eighteenth Air Force inherited nine continental "medium" troop carrier wings (314th, 375th, 403d, 433d, 434th, 435th, 443d, 514th and 515th), seven of which were Air Force Reserve wings called to active duty during the Korean War. The command added a "heavy" (C-124) wing (62d) in the fall of 1951 and another in early 1953 (463d).

One of those reserve wings, the 443d Troop Carrier, was deployed for active duty at Donaldson on 9 August 1951 as a training wing. For almost two years, the 443d participated in tactical exercises in operations, training troop carrier aircrews using C-46 Commandoes for assignment to the Far East and worked closely with other troop carrier groups to test and evaluate new troop carrier doctrine and procedures. With the end of the Korean War, the 443d was inactivated on 8 June 1953.

With the departure of the 443d, it was decided to bring Donaldson up to being an operational transport base. On 15 October 1953 the 63d Troop Carrier Wing was transferred from Altus Air Force Base, Oklahoma, to Donaldson. The 63d flew the longer-range C-124 "Globemaster II" and became the host unit at Donaldson AFB until its closure in 1963. Its attached units consisted of:

- Groups

61st Troop Carrier (25 August 1954 − 8 October 1959)
63d Troop Carrier (15 October 1953 − 18 January 1963)
64th Troop Carrier (15 October 1953 − 15 February 1954)

- Squadrons

9th Troop Carrier (1953–1957)
15th Troop Carrier (1954–1963)
52d Troop Carrier (1953–1957)
309th Troop Carrier (1954–1956)

The 63d TCW participated in maneuvers, exercises and the airlift of personnel and cargo to many points throughout the world, it helped evacuate Hungarian refugees, supported the construction of the eastern mission test range, and the Distant Early Warning Line sites in the Arctic.

The next year, the Eighteenth Air Force C-119s from the 483rd Troop Carrier Wing; flown by civilian crews employed by the Central Intelligence Agency Civil Air Transport airdropped supplies to besieged French paratroops at Dien Bien Phu. Some 483rd personnel flew missions in an unofficial capacity, some of whom would play key roles in the troop carrier mission in later years. After the Battle of Dien Bien Phu, 374th TCW and TAC C-124s airlifted wounded French soldiers out of Indochina to Japan.

Throughout the mid-1950s, Donaldson Air Force Base supported USAF troop carrier participation in joint operations training. Eighteenth Air Force squadrons took part in joint exercises and provided support for airborne paratroop training. Additional endeavors were implemented to improve communications capabilities and to include AF medical air evacuation in joint exercises. Airlift support was provided to other USAF major commands and to other Tactical Air Command (TAC) organizations.

Two helicopter squadrons, the 21st and 54th, flying the Piasecki H-21, were assigned to the Eighteenth Air Force in 1956 and 1957. Their mission was for the purpose of providing the US Army with air support in a fashion similar to the TAC Troop Carrier Squadrons. The Army, however, declined all support from the Air Force helicopters, and the 21st/54th Helicopter Squadron turned to flying airlift support, search and recovery missions, and also cooperated with a communications group in an experiment to lay communications lines by helicopter. Prior to inactivation, the unit flew photo, airlift, and radiological survey missions during atomic testing at the Nevada Test Site.

=== Military Air Transport Service ===
A realignment of Troop Carrier forces in 1957 led to the Eighteenth Air Force's C-124 wings being reassigned to the Military Air Transport Service (MATS). The command's headquarters was also moved to Connally AFB, Texas on 1 September 1957 when Donaldson AFB was turned over to MATS along with the C-124s and 63d TCW assigned there.

MATS C-124s from Donaldson flew the large aircraft all over the globe. Large hangars and expansive ramps were constructed to support these sizeable machines; the base became known as the "Troop Carrier Capital of the World".

==== 1958 Lebanon crisis ====
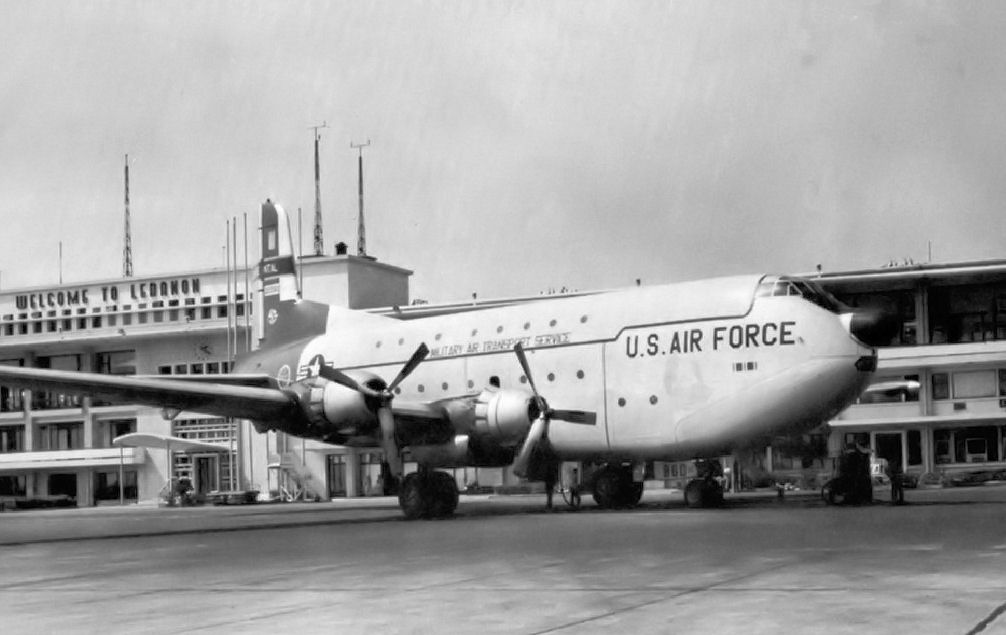
C-124 on the ramp at Beirut Airport, Lebanon, 1958

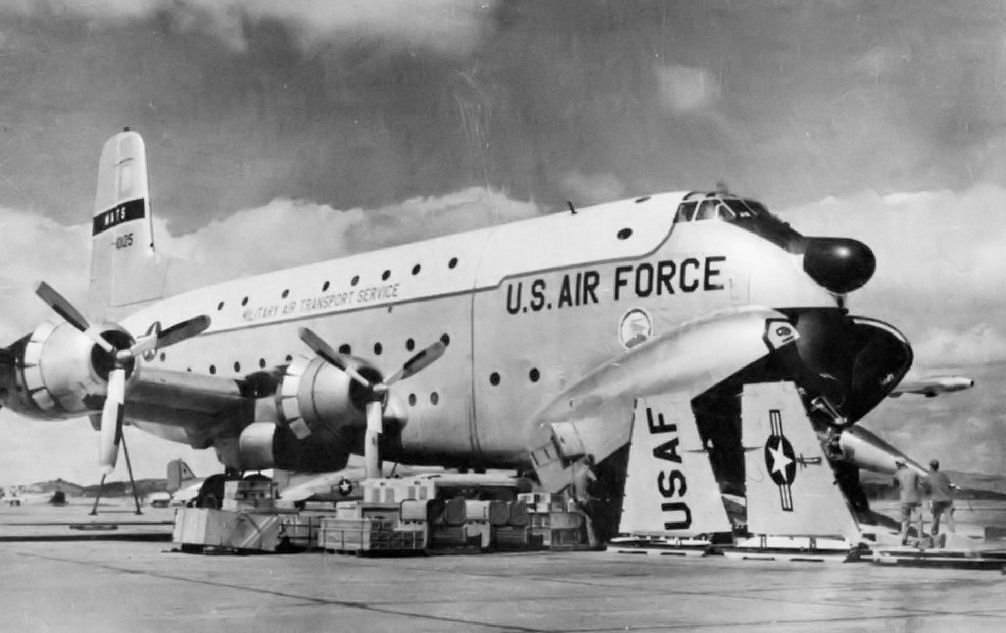
C-124 at Hamilton AFB, California being prepared to load a Lockheed F-104 Starfighter being transported to Formosa, 1958

In 1958 the Eisenhower Administration received an urgent call for assistance from the Middle East. The government of Lebanon was being threatened with attack. Sorely needed troops and supplies had to be airlifted to Lebanon as soon as possible, and it also had to be done without public knowledge, so as not to inform a possible enemy of the deployment of US troops. A task force of 36 MATS C-124s, with a significant number from the 63d TCW based at Donaldson were dispatched from the United States to Rhein-Main Air Base, West Germany to assist in the airlift, deploying Army and Marine units along with their weapons and equipment to Beirut.

==== 1958 Taiwan Strait Crisis ====
Also in 1958 the Chinese Communists were shelling Quemoy and threatening Matsu. These tiny islands in the Straits of Formosa are the closest Nationalist Chinese territory to the mainland of China. By using heavy artillery fire, the Communists appeared to be softening up the islands in preparation for invasion. Tactical Air Command was ordered to organize and send a Composite Air Strike Force to Formosa (now Taiwan). C-124s, some from the 63d TCW at Donaldson, transported F-104 Starfighter aircraft from Hamilton AFB, California along with their pilots, ground crews, and maintenance equipment and delivered them intact to Ching Chuan Kang Air Base. This operation marked a historical milestone as it was the first time that a complete operational Air Force squadron was airlifted in a single-package operation.

==== Congo Crisis ====
During the Congo Crisis in 1962, the 63d TCW deployed C-124s to fly United Nations troops and their equipment to central Africa. In addition to the troops, the aircraft also airlifted badly needed food to the Republic of the Congo (Leopoldville). In the initial phase of the airlift, MATS C-124s carried more than 4,000 troops from five different nations, in addition to thousands of tons of food and equipment. Included in these shipments flown in by MATS were such items as communications facilities, maintenance equipment, helicopters, liaison planes, and even complete mess halls. At some points the airlift was a two-way shuttle − ferrying in UN soldiers and flying out returning Belgian troops, or UN troops that had been replaced, to their homelands. MATS also made emergency trips, flying the 663 nautical miles (1,228 km) from Leopoldville to Stanleyville, and back, to rescue threatened refugees. C-124s flying to and from utilized the USAFE base at Châteauroux, France as a transshipment point for cargo arriving from the United States.

==== Laotian Civil War ====
In 1962, communist guerrillas in Laos had driven the Royal Lao Army before them and had captured two important cities. Now they were pushing toward the Mekong River which separates Laos from Thailand. The United States, under the terms of the Southeast Asia Treaty Organization, was meeting its defense obligations to Thailand. MATS C-124s were deployed to Don Muang Airport near Bangkok. 63d TCW heavy air transports were taking off every fifteen minutes from Don Muang to Udon RTAFB carrying Thai and United States Marines with their equipment some 300 miles (480 km) to the northeast to "show the flag", as well as put an armed force along the Mekong River. The Communist guerrilla forces did not cross the Mekong.

This was the first large-scale landing of US combat troops and the first in Southeast Asia since the Korean War, and foreshadowed the large United States presence in Southeast Asia in the coming years during the Vietnam War.

=== Closure ===
In December 1962, the Air Force announced plans to close the base permanently due to budget reductions. Donaldson AFB was declared surplus in 1963 and steps were taken to deed the property back to the City and County of Greenville. In January 1963, the 63d Troop Carrier Wing was transferred to Hunter Air Force Base, Georgia and Donaldson AFB was deactivated for the last time. Under the terms of an earlier reversionary clause, the entire 2,600 acres (11 km^{2}) were offered "as is". The City and County accepted the offer, and took title of the facilities on 25 January 1963.

== Legacy ==
The facilities and land of the former Donaldson AFB were returned to the City and County of Greenville and were renamed Donaldson Center Airport. Among the over 75 tenants of the industrial air park are Lockheed Martin; which services USAF, USN and USMC C-130s and USN P-3s there; Stevens Aviation (a 1950 spinoff of J.P. Stevens Company); 3M; Alan Pittman Race Cars (a fabricator of Pro Modified cars); the Greenville County Sheriff's Office Southern Area Command (SAC) and facilities supporting the U.S. Army, Navy, Air Force, and Marine Corps Reserves.

Donaldson's presence also led to the establishment of Greenville's first restaurant serving pizza. Julius N. Capri of Altoona, Pennsylvania was stationed at Greenville Army Air Base in 1944, and placed in charge of its civilian mechanics. After World War II, Capri's family opened the first of what later became several Italian restaurants near the base on Augusta Road.

== See also ==
- South Carolina World War II Army Airfields
